= Cicely Tyson on screen and stage =

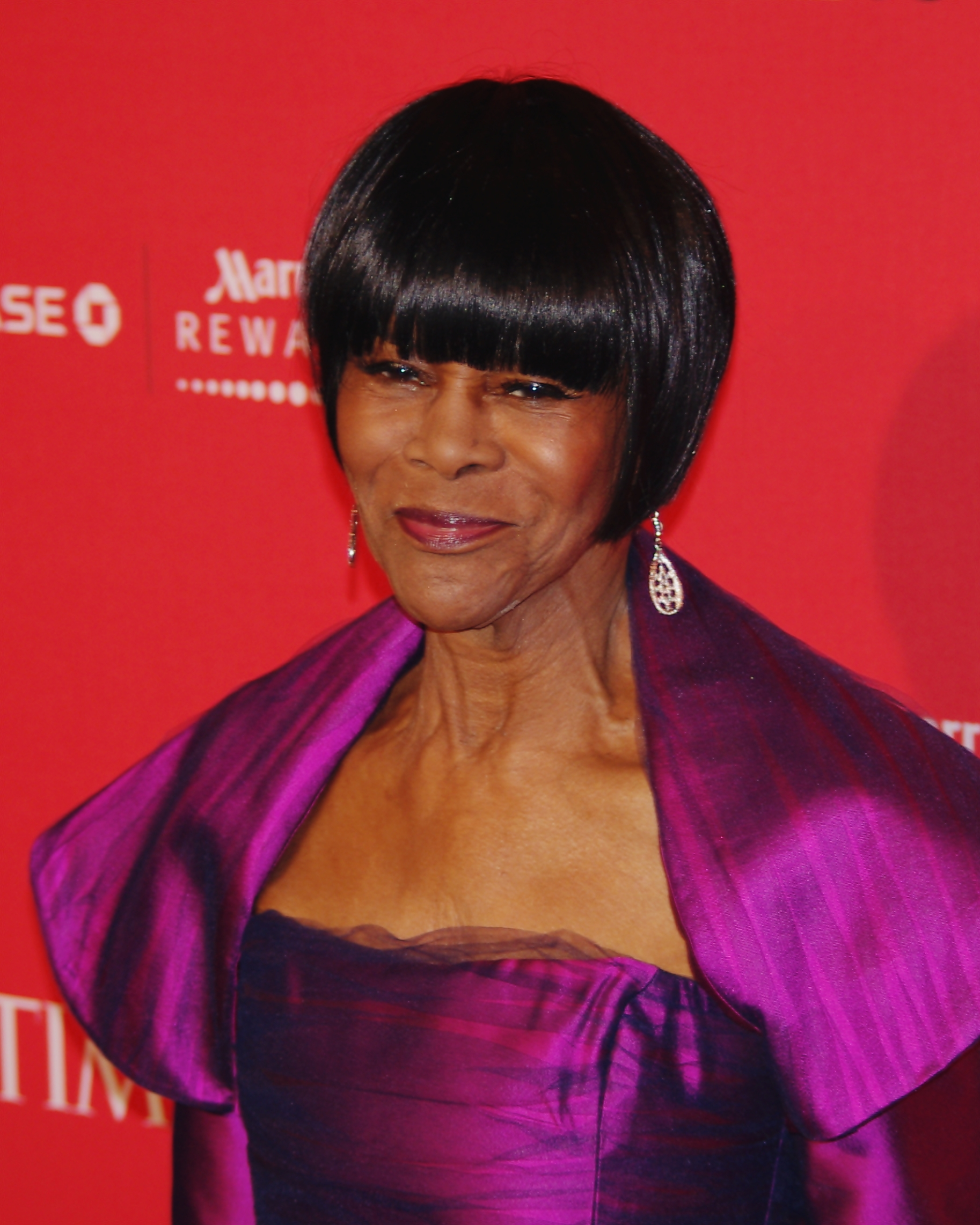
Cicely Tyson in 2012 at the Time 100 Gala

Cicely Tyson was an African American actress noted for her groundbreaking work in film, television and theatre.

== Filmography ==
=== Film ===
Year	Title	Role	Ref
1956	Carib Gold	Dottie (uncredited)	
1959	Odds Against Tomorrow	Jazz Club bartender (uncredited)	
1959	The Last Angry Man	Girl Left on Porch (uncredited)	
1960	Who Was That Lady?	Not available (uncredited)	
1966	A Man Called Adam	Claudia Ferguson	
1967	The Comedians	Marie Therese	
1968	The Heart Is a Lonely Hunter	Portia	
1972	Sounder	Rebecca Morgan	
1976	The Blue Bird	Tylette, The Cat	
1976	The River Niger	Mattie Williams	
1978	A Hero Ain't Nothin' but a Sandwich	Sweets	
1979	The Concorde... Airport '79	Elaine	
1981	Bustin' Loose	Vivian Perry	
1991	Fried Green Tomatoes	Sipsey	
1997	Hoodlum	Stephanie St. Clair	
2001	The Double Dutch Divas!	Herself (uncredited)	
2005	Because of Winn-Dixie	Gloria Dump	
2005	Diary of a Mad Black Woman	Myrtle	
2006	Madea's Family Reunion	Myrtle	
2006	Fat Rose and Squeaky	Celine	
2006	Idlewild	Mother Hopkins	
2007	Rwanda Rising	Voice of Jeanette Nyirabagarwa	
2009	Up from the Bottoms: The Search for the American Dream	Narrator	
2010	Why Did I Get Married Too?	Ola	
2011	The Help	Constantine Jefferson	
2012	Alex Cross	Regina "Nana Mama" Cross	
2013	The Haunting in Connecticut 2: Ghosts of Georgia	Mamma Kay	
2016	Showing Roots	Hattie	
2017	Last Flag Flying	Mrs. Hightower	
2020	A Fall from Grace	Alice	

=== Television ===
Year	Title	Role	Notes	Ref
1961	Frontiers of Faith		"The Bitter Cup"	
1962	The Nurses	Betty Ann Warner	Episode: "Frieda"	
1963	To Tell the Truth	Decoy contestant	Episode: March 25, 1963 (decoy for Shirley Abicair)	
1963	Naked City		Episode: "Howard Running Bear Is a Turtle"	
1963–1964	East Side/West Side	Jane Foster	26 episodes	
1965	Slattery's People	Sarah Brookman	Episode: "Question: Who You Taking to the Main Event, Eddie?"	
1965–1966	I Spy	Princess Amara; Vickie Harmon	2 episodes	
1966	Guiding Light	Martha Frazier		
1967	Cowboy in Africa	Julie Anderson	Episode: "Tomorrow on the Wind"	
1967	Judd for the Defense	Lucille Evans	Episode: "Commitment"	
1968–1969	The F.B.I.	Julie Harmon; Lainey Harber	2 episodes	
1969	Medical Center	Susan Wiley	Episode: "The Last 10 Yards"	
1969	The Courtship of Eddie's Father	Betty Kelly	Episode: "Guess Who's Coming for Lunch"	
1970	Gunsmoke	Rachel Biggs	Episode: "The Scavengers"	
1970	Mission: Impossible	Alma Ross	Episode: "Death Squad"	
1970	The Bill Cosby Show	Mildred Hermosa	Episode: "Blind Date"	
1970	Here Come the Brides	Princess Lucenda	Episode: "A Bride for Obie Brown"	
1971	Marriage: Year One	Emma Teasley		
1971	Neighbors			
1972	Emergency!	Mrs. Johnson	Episode: "Crash"	
1972	Soul Train			
1972	Wednesday Night Out			
1974	The Autobiography of Miss Jane Pittman	Jane Pittman		
1974	Free to Be… You and Me	Herself		
1976	Just an Old Sweet Song	Priscilla Simmons		
1977	Roots	Binta	Miniseries	
1977	Wilma	Blanche Rudolph		
1978	King	Coretta Scott King	Miniseries	
1978	A Woman Called Moses	Harriet Ross Tubman		
1979	Saturday Night Live	Herself (host)	Episode: "Cicely Tyson/Talking Heads"	
1981	The Body Human: Becoming a Woman	Host		
1981	The Marva Collins Story	Marva Collins		
1982	Benny's Place	Odessa		
1985	Playing with Fire	Carol Phillips		
1986	Intimate Encounters	Dr. Claire Dalton		
1986	Acceptable Risks	Janet Framm		
1986	Samaritan: The Mitch Snyder Story	Muriel		
1989	The Women of Brewster Place	Mrs. Browne		
1990	The Kid Who Loved Christmas	Etta		
1990	B.L. Stryker	Ruth Hastings	Episode: "Winner Takes All"	
1990	Heat Wave	Ruthana Richardson		
1991	Clippers	Donna	Short	
1992	Duplicates	Dr. Randolph		
1992	When No One Would Listen	Sarah		
1993	House of Secrets	Evangeline		
1994	Oldest Living Confederate Widow Tells All	Castralia; Marsden Family House Slave/Maid		
1994–1995	Sweet Justice	Carrie Grace Battle		
1996	The Road to Galveston	Jordan Roosevelt		
1997	Bridge of Time	Guardian		
1997	Riot	Maggie	Segment: "Homecoming Day"	
1997	Ms. Scrooge	Ms. Ebenita Scrooge		
1997	The Price of Heaven (Blessed Assurance)	Vesta Lotte Battle		
1998	Always Outnumbered	Luvia		
1998	Mama Flora's Family	Mama Flora		
1999	A Lesson Before Dying	Tante Lou		
1999	Aftershock: Earthquake in New York	Emily Lincoln		
2000	Touched by an Angel	Abigail Peabody-Jackson	Episode: "Living the Rest of My Life"	
2000	The Outer Limits	Justice Gretchen Parkhurst	Episode: "Final Appeal"	
2001	Jewel	Cathedral		
2001	The Proud Family	Mrs. Maureen Parker (voice)	Episode: "Behind Family Lines"	
2002	The Rosa Parks Story	Leona Edwards McCauley		
2005	Higglytown Heroes	Great Aunt Shirley Hero (voice)	Episode: "Wayne's 100 Special Somethings"	
2009	Relative Stranger	Pearl		
2009	Law & Order: Special Victims Unit	Ondine Burdett	Episode: "Hell"	
2014	The Trip to Bountiful	Mrs. Carrie Watts	TV movie	
2015–2020	How to Get Away with Murder	Ophelia Harkness	10 episodes Guest (season 1-5), recurring (season 6). Final acting role.	
2016	House of Cards	Doris Jones	3 episodes	
2019	Madam Secretary	Flo Avery	Episode: "Leaving the Station"	
2020	Cherish the Day	Miss Luma Lee Langston	Series regular	

=== Theatre ===
Year	Title	Role	Theatre	Ref.
1957	Dark of the Moon		Little Theatre	
1959	Jolly's Progress	Jolly (understudy)	Longacre Theatre	
1960	The Cool World	Girl	Eugene O'Neill Theatre	
1961	The Blacks: A Clown Show	Stephanie Virtue Diop	St. Mark's Playhouse	
1962	Moon on a Rainbow Shawl		East 11th Street Theater	
1962	Tiger, Tiger Burning Bright	Celeste Chipley; Adelaide Smith (understudy)	Booth Theatre	
1963	The Blue Boy in Black	Joan	Masque Theatre	
1963	Trumpets of the Lord	Rev. Marion Alexander	Astor Place Theatre	
1966	A Hand Is on the Gate	Performer	Longacre Theatre	
1968	Carry Me Back to Morningside Heights	Myrna Jessup	John Golden Theatre	
1969	To Be Young, Gifted and Black	Various	Cherry Lane Theatre	
1969	Trumpets of the Lord	Rev. Marion Alexander	Brooks Atkinson Theatre	
1983	The Corn Is Green	Miss Moffat	Lunt-Fontanne Theatre	
2013	The Trip to Bountiful	Miss Carrie Watts	Stephen Sondheim Theatre	
2015	The Gin Game	Fonsia Dorsey	John Golden Theater	

=== Radio ===
Year	Title	Role	Ref.
1979	Sears Radio Theater	Host, Thursdays; "Love and Hate Night"	
