= List of awards and nominations received by Cicely Tyson =

Cicely Tyson awards and nominations
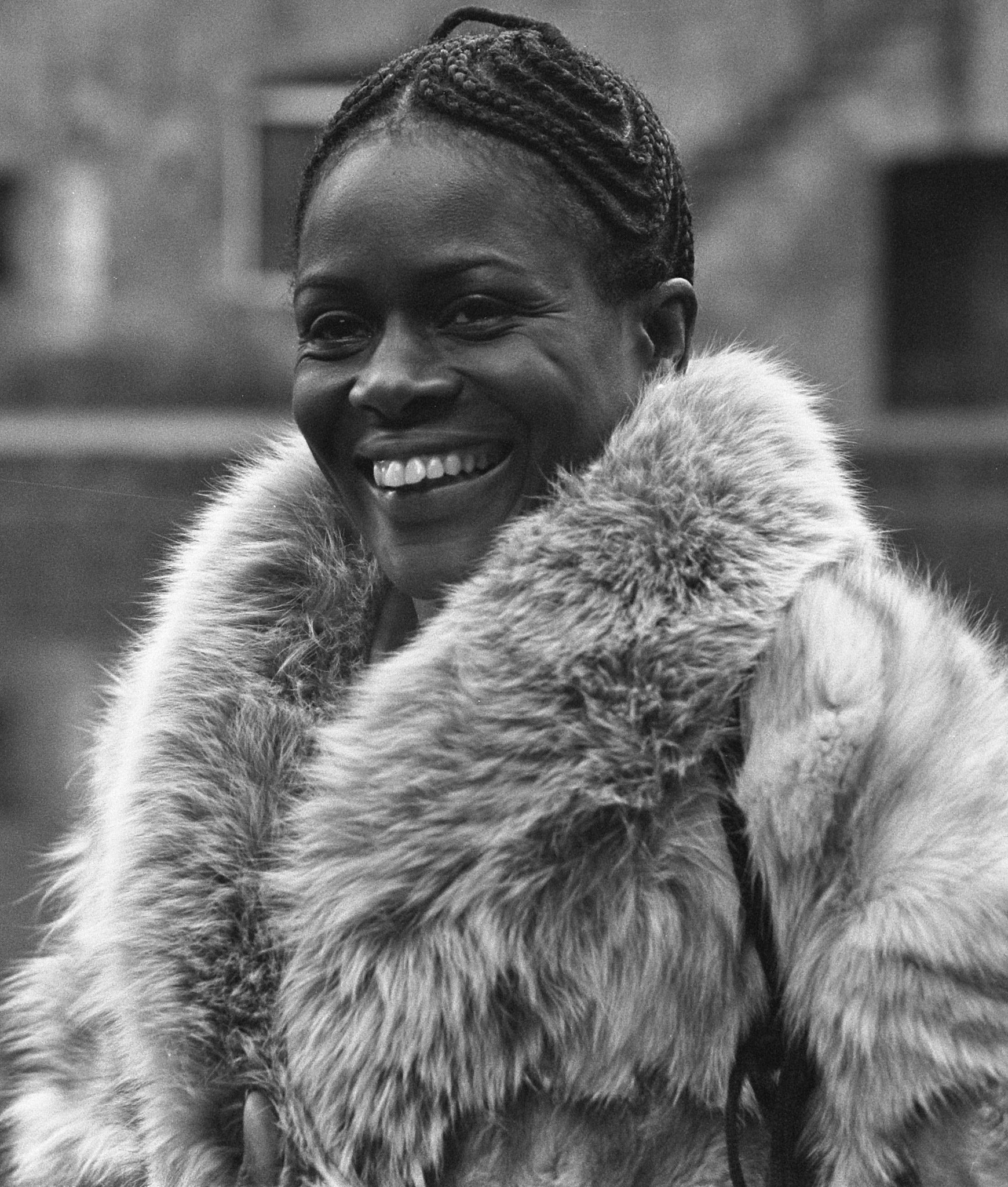
- Tyson in 1973
Award	Wins	Nominations
Academy Awards	1	2
Tony Award	1	1
Daytime Emmy Award	0	1
Primetime Emmy Award	3	16
Golden Globe Awards	0	1

Cicely Tyson was the recipient of numerous accolades, including an honorary Academy Award, three Emmy Awards, and a Tony Award. One of the most acclaimed actresses of her generation, she is known for her portrayals of determined, elegant and dignified female characters in film, on television and in the theatre.

Tyson won three Primetime Emmy Awards for her work in television, winning for The Autobiography of Miss Jane Pittman (1974) and Oldest Living Confederate Widow Tells All (1994). She won the Tony Award for Best Actress in a Play for her performance in The Trip to Bountiful in 2014. Tyson won her Honorary Academy Award in 2018 with the inscription reading, "Whose unforgettable performances and personal integrity have inspired generations of filmmakers, actors and audiences."

== Major associations ==
=== Academy Awards ===
Note: The year given is the year of the ceremony

Year	Category	Nominated work	Result	Ref.
1973	Best Actress	Sounder	Nominated	
2018	Academy Honorary Award	–	Won	

=== British Academy Film Awards ===
Year	Category	Nominated work	Result	Ref.
1974	Best Actress in a Leading Role	The Autobiography of Miss Jane Pittman	Nominated	

=== Emmy Award ===
Year	Category	Nominated work	Result	Ref.
Daytime Emmy Award
1982	Outstanding Individual Achievement in Children's Programming – Performers	The Human Body: Becoming a Woman	Nominated	
Primetime Emmy Award
1974	Outstanding Lead Actress in a Drama	The Autobiography of Miss Jane Pittman	Won	
1974	Actress of the Year – Special	The Autobiography of Miss Jane Pittman	Won	
1977	Outstanding Single Performance by a Supporting Actress in a Comedy or Drama Series	Roots	Nominated	
1978	Outstanding Lead Actress in a Limited Series	King	Nominated	
1982	Outstanding Lead Actress in a Limited Series or a Special	Hallmark Hall of Fame	Nominated	
1994	Outstanding Supporting Actress in a Miniseries or Special	Oldest Living Confederate Widow Tells All	Won	
1995	Outstanding Lead Actress in a Drama Series	Sweet Justice	Nominated	
1999	Outstanding Supporting Actress in a Miniseries or a Movie	A Lesson Before Dying	Nominated	
2009	Outstanding Supporting Actress in a Miniseries or Movie	Relative Stranger	Nominated	
2014	Outstanding Lead Actress in a Miniseries or a Movie	The Trip to Bountiful	Nominated	
2014	Outstanding Television Movie	The Trip to Bountiful	Nominated	
2015	Outstanding Guest Actress in a Drama Series	How to Get Away with Murder	Nominated	
2017	Outstanding Guest Actress in a Drama Series	How to Get Away with Murder	Nominated	
2018	Outstanding Guest Actress in a Drama Series	How to Get Away with Murder	Nominated	
2019	Outstanding Guest Actress in a Drama Series	How to Get Away with Murder	Nominated	
2020	Outstanding Guest Actress in a Drama Series	How to Get Away with Murder	Nominated	

=== Golden Globe Awards ===
Note: The year given is the year of the ceremony

Year	Category	Nominated work	Result	Ref.
1973	Best Actress in a Motion Picture – Drama	Sounder	Nominated	

=== Screen Actors Guild Awards ===
Year	Category	Nominated work	Result	Ref.
1995	Outstanding Actress in a Drama Series	Sweet Justice	Nominated	
1995	Outstanding Actress in a Miniseries or TV Movie	Oldest Living Confederate Widow Tells All	Nominated	
1996	Outstanding Actress in a Miniseries or TV Movie	The Road to Galveston	Nominated	
2011	Outstanding Cast in a Motion Picture	The Help	Won	
2014	Outstanding Actress in a Miniseries or TV Movie	The Trip to Bountiful	Nominated	

=== Tony Awards ===
Note: The year given is the year of the ceremony

Year	Category	Nominated work	Result	Ref.
2013	Best Actress in a Play	The Trip to Bountiful	Won	

== Honours ==
Note: The year given is the year of the ceremony

Year	Award	Result	Ref.
2015	Kennedy Center Honor	Won	
2016	Presidential Medal of Freedom	Won	
2020	Career Achievement Peabody	Won	
2020	Television Hall of Fame	Won	

== Critics awards ==
Year	Award	Nominated work	Result
1972	Kansas City Film Critics Circle Award for Best Actress	Sounder	Won
1972	National Board of Review Award for Best Actress	Sounder	Won
1972	National Society of Film Critics Award for Best Actress	Sounder	Won
1997	Acapulco Black Film Festival Award for Best Actress	Hoodlum	Nominated
1997	NAACP Image Award for Outstanding Supporting Actress in a Motion Picture	Hoodlum	Nominated
2005	NAACP Image Award for Outstanding Supporting Actress in a Motion Picture	Diary of a Mad Black Woman	Nominated
2005	BET Comedy Award for Outstanding Supporting Actress in a Theatrical Film	Diary of a Mad Black Woman	Nominated
2005	Black Movie Award for Outstanding Performance by an Actress in a Supporting Role	Diary of a Mad Black Woman	Nominated
2011	Black Film Critics Circle Award for Best Ensemble	The Help	Won
2011	Black Reel Award for Best Ensemble	The Help	Won
2011	Broadcast Film Critics Association Award for Best Cast	The Help	Won
2011	Hollywood Film Festival Award for Ensemble of the Year	The Help	Won
2011	National Board of Review Award for Best Cast	The Help	Won
2011	Satellite Award for Best Cast – Motion Picture	The Help	Won
2011	Southeastern Film Critics Association Award for Best Ensemble	The Help	Won
2011	Women Film Critics Circle Award for Best Ensemble	The Help	Won
2011	Central Ohio Film Critics Association for Best Ensemble	The Help	Nominated
2011	Detroit Film Critics Society Award for Best Ensemble	The Help	Nominated
2011	San Diego Film Critics Society Award for Best Performance by an Ensemble	The Help	Nominated
2011	Washington D.C. Area Film Critics Association Award for Best Ensemble	The Help	Nominated
2014	Black Reel Award for Best Actress: T.V. Movie/Cable	The Trip to Bountiful	Won
2014	NAACP Image Award for Outstanding Actress in a Television Movie, Mini-Series or Dramatic Special	The Trip to Bountiful	Won
2014	Online Film & Television Association Award for Best Actress in a Motion Picture or Miniseries	The Trip to Bountiful	Won
2014	Critics' Choice Television Award for Best Actress in a Movie/Miniseries	The Trip to Bountiful	Nominated
2014	Satellite Award for Best Actress in a Miniseries or TV Film	The Trip to Bountiful	Nominated
2017	Critics' Choice Television Award for Best Guest Performer in a Drama Series	How to Get Away with Murder	Nominated
2016	NAACP Image Award for Outstanding Supporting Actress in a Drama Series	How to Get Away with Murder	Nominated
2017	NAACP Image Award for Outstanding Supporting Actress in a Drama Series	How to Get Away with Murder	Nominated
