= 26th Primetime Emmy Awards =

1974 American television programming awards

- Date: May 28, 1974
- Location: Pantages Theatre, Los Angeles, California
- Presented by: Academy of Television Arts and Sciences
- Hosted by: Johnny Carson

Highlights
- Most awards: The Autobiography of Miss Jane Pittman; The Carol Burnett Show (4)
- Most nominations: M*A*S*H; The Waltons (9)
- Outstanding Comedy Series: M*A*S*H
- Outstanding Drama Series: Upstairs, Downstairs
- Outstanding Limited Series: Columbo
- Outstanding Music-Variety Series: The Carol Burnett Show

Television/radio coverage
- Network: NBC

The 26th Emmy Awards, later known as the 26th Primetime Emmy Awards, were handed out on May 28, 1974. Johnny Carson hosted the ceremony. 31 traditional awards were presented. Winners are listed in bold and networks are in parentheses.

The top shows of the night were M*A*S*H and Upstairs, Downstairs. M*A*S*H and The Waltons had the most major nominations with nine. The Autobiography of Miss Jane Pittman and The Carol Burnett Show led the night with four major wins apiece.

For this ceremony, individual awards dubbed "Super Emmys" were given out in addition to the traditional categories. The individual categories were dropped the following year and have yet to return since.

== Winners and nominees ==
=== Programs ===
Programs
**Outstanding Comedy Series**: **M*A*S*H (CBS)**; All in the Family (CBS); The Mary Tyler Moore Show (CBS); The Odd Couple (ABC)	**Outstanding Drama Series**: **Upstairs, Downstairs (PBS)**; Kojak (CBS); Police Story (NBC); The Streets of San Francisco (ABC); The Waltons (CBS)
**Outstanding Music-Variety Series**: **The Carol Burnett Show (CBS)**; The Sonny & Cher Comedy Hour (CBS); The Tonight Show Starring Johnny Carson (NBC)	**Outstanding Comedy-Variety, Variety or Music Special**: **Lily (CBS)**; Barbra Streisand and Other Musical Instruments (CBS); The John Denver Show (ABC); Magnavox Presents Frank Sinatra (NBC)
**Outstanding Special – Comedy or Drama**: **The Autobiography of Miss Jane Pittman (CBS)**; 6 Rms Riv Vu (CBS); The Execution of Private Slovik (NBC); The Migrants (CBS); Steambath (PBS)	**Outstanding Limited Series**: **Columbo (NBC)**; The Blue Knight (NBC); McCloud (NBC)

=== Acting ===
==== Lead performances ====
Acting
**Best Lead Actor in a Comedy Series**: **Alan Alda as Hawkeye Pierce in M*A*S*H (CBS)**; Redd Foxx as Fred G. Sanford in Sanford and Son (NBC); Jack Klugman as Oscar Madison in The Odd Couple (ABC); Carroll O'Connor as Archie Bunker in All in the Family (CBS); Tony Randall as Felix Unger in The Odd Couple (ABC)	**Best Lead Actress in a Comedy Series**: **Mary Tyler Moore as Mary Richards in The Mary Tyler Moore Show (CBS) (Episode: "Best of Enemies")**; Bea Arthur as Maude Findlay in Maude (CBS); Jean Stapleton as Edith Bunker in All in the Family (CBS)
**Best Lead Actor in a Drama Series**: **Telly Savalas as Theo Kojak in Kojak (CBS) (Episode: "Requiem For a Cop")**; William Conrad as Frank Cannon in Cannon (CBS); Karl Malden as Detective Lt. Mike Stone in The Streets of San Francisco (ABC); Richard Thomas as John-Boy Walton in The Waltons (CBS)	**Best Lead Actress in a Drama Series**: **Michael Learned as Olivia Walton in The Waltons (CBS)**; Jean Marsh as Rose in Upstairs, Downstairs (PBS); Jeanette Nolan as Sally Fergus in Dirty Sally (CBS)
**Best Lead Actor in a Drama**: **Hal Holbrook as Capt. Lloyd Bucher in Pueblo (ABC)**; Alan Alda as Paul Friedman in 6 Rms Riv Vu (CBS); Laurence Olivier as Shylock in The Merchant of Venice (ABC); Martin Sheen as Eddie Slovik in The Execution of Private Slovik (NBC); Dick Van Dyke as Charlie Lester in The Morning After (ABC)	**Best Lead Actress in a Drama**: **Cicely Tyson as Jane Pittman in The Autobiography of Miss Jane Pittman (CBS)**; Carol Burnett as Anne Miller in 6 Rms Riv Vu (CBS); Katharine Hepburn as Amanda Wingfield in The Glass Menagerie (ABC); Cloris Leachman as Viola Barlow in The Migrants (CBS); Elizabeth Montgomery as Ellen Harrod in A Case of Rape (NBC)
**Best Lead Actor in a Limited Series**: **William Holden as Bumper Morgan in The Blue Knight (NBC)**; Peter Falk as Lt. Columbo in Columbo (NBC); Dennis Weaver as Sam McCloud in McCloud (NBC)	**Best Lead Actress in a Limited Series**: **Mildred Natwick as Gwendolyn Snoop Nicholson in The Snoop Sisters (NBC)**; Helen Hayes as Ernesta Snoop in The Snoop Sisters (NBC); Lee Remick as Cassie Walters in The Blue Knight (NBC)

==== Supporting performances ====
**Best Supporting Actor in Comedy**: **Rob Reiner as Michael Stivic in All in the Family (CBS) (Episode: "The Games Bunkers Play")**; Edward Asner as Lou Grant in The Mary Tyler Moore Show (CBS); Gary Burghoff as Radar O'Reilly in M*A*S*H (CBS); Ted Knight as Ted Baxter in The Mary Tyler Moore Show (CBS); McLean Stevenson as Henry Blake in M*A*S*H (CBS)	**Best Supporting Actress in Comedy**: **Cloris Leachman as Phyllis Lindstrom in The Mary Tyler Moore Show (CBS) (Episode: "The Lars Affair")**; Valerie Harper as Rhoda Morgenstern in The Mary Tyler Moore Show (CBS); Sally Struthers as Gloria Stivic in All in the Family (CBS); Loretta Swit as Margaret Houlihan in M*A*S*H (CBS)
**Best Supporting Actor in Drama**: **Michael Moriarty as Jim O'Connor in The Glass Menagerie (ABC)**; Michael Douglas as Steve Keller in The Streets of San Francisco (ABC); Will Geer as Zebulon Walton in The Waltons (CBS); Sam Waterston as Tom Wingfield in The Glass Menagerie (ABC)	**Best Supporting Actress in Drama**: **Joanna Miles as Laura Wingfield in The Glass Menagerie (ABC)**; Ellen Corby as Esther Walton in The Waltons (CBS); Nancy Walker as Mildred in McMillan & Wife (NBC)
**Best Supporting Actor in Comedy-Variety, Variety or Music**: **Harvey Korman in The Carol Burnett Show (CBS)**; Foster Brooks in The Dean Martin Comedy Hour (NBC); Tim Conway in The Carol Burnett Show (CBS)	**Best Supporting Actress in Comedy-Variety, Variety or Music**: **Brenda Vaccaro in The Shape of Things (CBS)**; Ruth Buzzi in The Dean Martin Comedy Hour (NBC); Lee Grant in The Shape of Things (CBS); Vicki Lawrence in The Carol Burnett Show (CBS)

=== Directing ===
Directing
**Best Directing in Comedy**: **M*A*S*H (CBS): "Carry on, Hawkeye" – Jackie Cooper**; M*A*S*H (CBS): "Deal Me Out" – Gene Reynolds; The Mary Tyler Moore Show (CBS): "Lou's First Date" – Jay Sandrich	**Best Directing in Drama – Single Program of a Series with Continuing Characters and/or Theme**: **The Blue Knight (NBC): "Part III" – Robert Butler**; The Waltons (CBS): "The Journey" – Harry Harris; The Waltons (CBS): "The Thanksgiving Story" – Philip Leacock
**Best Directing in Comedy-Variety, Variety or Music**: **Barbra Streisand and Other Musical Instruments (CBS) – Dwight Hemion**; Magnavox Presents Frank Sinatra (NBC) – Marty Pasetta; Mitzi... A Tribute to the American Housewife (CBS) – Tony Charmoli; Peggy Fleming Visits the Soviet Union (NBC) – Sterling Johnson	**Best Directing in Variety or Music**: **The Carol Burnett Show (CBS): "The Australia Show" – Dave Powers**; In Concert (ABC): "Cat Stevens" – Joshua White; The Sonny & Cher Comedy Hour (CBS): "Ken Berry and George Foreman" – Art Fisher
**Best Directing in Drama – Single Program – Comedy or Drama**: **The Autobiography of Miss Jane Pittman – John Korty (CBS)**; A Case of Rape (NBC) – Boris Sagal; The Execution of Private Slovik (NBC) – Lamont Johnson; The Migrants (CBS) – Tom Gries; Pueblo (ABC) – Anthony Page

=== Writing ===
Writing
**Best Writing in Comedy**: **The Mary Tyler Moore Show (CBS): "The Lou and Edie Story" – Treva Silverman**; M*A*S*H (CBS): "Hot Lips and Empty Arms" – Linda Bloodworth-Thomason and Mary Kay Place; M*A*S*H (CBS): "The Trial of Henry Blake" – McLean Stevenson	**Best Writing in Drama**: **The Waltons (CBS): "The Thanksgiving Story" – Joanna Lee**; Kojak (CBS): "Death is Not a Passing Grade" – Gene R. Kearney; The Waltons (CBS): "The Easter Story" – John McGreevey
**Best Writing in Comedy-Variety, Variety or Music**: **Lily (CBS)**; Barbra Streisand and Other Musical Instruments (CBS); Paradise (CBS)	**Best Writing in Variety or Music**: **The Carol Burnett Show (CBS): "Bernadette Peters"**; The Carol Burnett Show (CBS): "The Family Show"; The Sonny & Cher Comedy Hour (CBS): "Chuck Connors and Howard Cosell"
**Best Writing in Drama – Original Teleplay**: **Tell Me Where It Hurts (CBS) – Fay Kanin**; Cry Rape (CBS) – Will Lorin; The Migrants (CBS) – Lanford Wilson	**Best Writing in Drama – Adaptation**: **The Autobiography of Miss Jane Pittman (CBS) – Tracy Keenan Wynn**; The Execution of Private Slovik (NBC) – Richard Levinson and William Link; Steambath (PBS) – Bruce Jay Friedman

=== Super Emmys ===
The Primetime Super Emmy Award was a set of 14 awards that were given in conjunction with the traditional Emmy Awards at the 1974 ceremony.

Winners of a traditional Emmy would then compete against their genre counterpart from the same category (comedy vs. drama for "Series", miniseries vs. telefilm for "Special"). This format would prove to be the Super Emmy's undoing. In order to vote on a Super Emmy winner, the traditional Emmy winners had to be announced well before the ceremony.

Several members of the Television Academy were against implementing the new awards. Super Emmy winners Alan Alda and Mary Tyler Moore were some of the loudest detractors. Both threatened to resign from the academy if they were installed. During their acceptance speeches, Moore said that comparing comedic and dramatic television was "apples to oranges". Alda went one step further in his speech "it's comparing apples to oranges to Volkswagens."

The Super Emmy was never awarded again.

==== Acting ====
**Actor of the Year – Series**: **Alan Alda as Hawkeye Pierce in M*A*S*H (CBS)**; Telly Savalas as Theo Kojak in Kojak (CBS)	**Actor of the Year – Special**: **Hal Holbrook as Capt. Lloyd Bucher in Pueblo (ABC)**; William Holden as Bumper Morgan in The Blue Knight (NBC)
**Actress of the Year – Series**: **Mary Tyler Moore as Mary Richards in The Mary Tyler Moore Show (CBS)**; Michael Learned as Olivia Walton in The Waltons (CBS)	**Actress of the Year – Special**: **Cicely Tyson as Jane Pittman in The Autobiography of Miss Jane Pittman (CBS)**; Mildred Natwick as Gwendolyn Snoop Nicholson in The Snoop Sisters (NBC)
**Supporting Actor of the Year**: **Michael Moriarty as Jim O'Connor in The Glass Menagerie (ABC)**; Rob Reiner as Michael Stivic in All in the Family (CBS)	**Supporting Actress of the Year**: **Joanna Miles as Laura Wingfield in The Glass Menagerie (ABC)**; Cloris Leachman as Phyllis Lindstrom in The Mary Tyler Moore Show (CBS)

==== Directing ====
**Director of the Year – Series**: **Robert Butler for The Blue Knight, (Episode: "Part III"), (NBC)**; Jackie Cooper for M*A*S*H, (Episode: "Carry on, Hawkeye"), (CBS)	**Director of the Year – Special**: **Dwight Hemion for Barbra Streisand and Other Musical Instruments, (CBS)**; John Korty for The Autobiography of Miss Jane Pittman, (CBS)

==== Writing ====
**Writer of the Year – Series**: **Treva Silverman for The Mary Tyler Moore Show, (Episode: "The Lou And Edie Story"), (CBS)**; Joanna Lee for The Waltons, (Episode: "The Thanksgiving Story"), (CBS)	**Writer of the Year – Special**: **Fay Kanin for Tell Me Where it Hurts, (CBS)**; Tracy Keenan Wynn for The Autobiography of Miss Jane Pittman, (CBS)

==== Craft categories ====
**Art & Set Director of the Year**: **Jan Scott & Charles Kreiner for The Lie (CBS)**; Brian Bartholomew for Barbra Streisand and Other Musical Instruments (CBS)	**Cinematographer of the Year**: **Ted Voigtlander for It's Good to Be Alive (CBS)**; Harry L. Wolf for Columbo: "Any Old Port in a Storm" (NBC)
**Film Editor of the Year**: **Frank Morriss for The Execution of Private Slovik (NBC)**; Gene Fowler Jr., Marjorie Fowler, and Samuel E. Beetley for The Blue Knight (NBC)	**Musician of the Year**: **Jack Parnell, Ken Welch, and Mitzie Welch for Barbra Streisand and Other Musical Instruments (CBS)**

== Most major nominations ==
Networks with multiple major nominations (Note: "Major" constitutes the categories listed above: Program, Acting, Directing, and Writing. Does not include the technical categories.)
Network	Number of Nominations
CBS	71
NBC	23
ABC	18

Programs with multiple major nominations
Program	Category	Network	Number of Nominations
M*A*S*H	Comedy	CBS	9
The Waltons	Drama	CBS	9
The Mary Tyler Moore Show	Comedy	CBS	8
The Carol Burnett Show	Variety	CBS	7
All in the Family	Comedy	CBS	5
The Autobiography of Miss Jane Pittman	Special	CBS	4
The Blue Knight	Limited	NBC	4
The Execution of Private Slovik	Special	NBC	4
The Glass Menagerie	Special	ABC	4
The Migrants	Special	CBS	4
6 Rms Riv Vu	Special	CBS	3
Barbra Streisand and Other Musical Instruments	Variety	CBS	3
Kojak	Drama	CBS	3
The Odd Couple	Comedy	ABC	3
The Sonny & Cher Comedy Hour	Variety	CBS	3
The Streets of San Francisco	Drama	ABC	3
A Case of Rape	Special	NBC	2
Columbo	Limited	NBC	2
The Dean Martin Comedy Hour	Variety	NBC	2
Lily	Variety	CBS	2
Magnavox Presents Frank Sinatra	Variety	NBC	2
McCloud	Limited	NBC	2
Pueblo	Special	ABC	2
The Shape of Things	Variety	CBS	2
The Snoop Sisters	Limited	NBC	2
Steambath	Special	PBS	2
Upstairs, Downstairs	Drama	PBS	2

== Most major awards ==
Networks with multiple major awards
Network	Number of Awards
CBS	27
ABC	6
NBC	5

Programs with multiple major awards
Program	Category	Network	Number of Awards
The Autobiography of Miss Jane Pittman	Special	CBS	4
The Carol Burnett Show	Variety	CBS	4
M*A*S*H	Comedy	CBS	3
The Mary Tyler Moore Show	Comedy	CBS	3
The Blue Knight	Limited	NBC	2
The Glass Menagerie	Special	ABC	2
Lily	Variety	CBS	2
The Waltons	Drama	CBS	2
