= The Price of Heaven (1997 film) =

- Genre: Drama
- Based on: Blessed Assurance: A Moral Tale by Allan Gurganus
- Screenplay by: Joyce Eliason
- Directed by: Peter Bogdanovich
- Starring: Grant Show; Cicely Tyson; Lori Loughlin; George Wendt
- Original language: English

Production
- Producer: Jack Clements
- Running time: 92 minutes
- Production company: Konigsberg Productions

Original release
- Network: CBS
- Release: August 17, 1997

The Price of Heaven is a TV movie directed by Peter Bogdanovich. It was an adaptation of Allan Gurganus's novella Blessed Assurance: A Moral Tale from the book White People.

== Plot ==
Vesta Lotte Battle is a spinster who fixes broken china. She befriends Jerry Hill (Grant Show), a young white man who has returned from the Korean War. He works for a ruthless businessman (George Wendt) who persuades him to exploit poor blacks by selling them funeral insurance.

== Cast ==
- Grant Show as Jerry Shand
- Cicely Tyson as Vesta Lotte Battle
- Lori Loughlin as Leslie
- George Wendt as Sam
- Cari Shayne as Claire Gundry
- Rebecca Koon as Zella Shand
- Allan Gurganus as Professor Title
- Shannon Eubanks as Mrs. Gundry

== Reception ==
The New York Times said the film was "marred by a screenplay that makes its upper-class white characters... simply stupid rather than complicatedly so. But the back-and-forth between Ms. Tyson and Mr. Show is quick and sure, and they are very good at illustrating how imperfect redemption is better than no redemption at all."

The Los Angeles Times said "Bogdanovich is frightfully ham-fisted at times, but for the most part, he gently underscores what's going on here. Though it's never directly addressed, a civil rights awareness is blossoming in certain of these characters. Yet despite its good intentions, "The Price of Heaven" fizzles into just another tale of a handsome, promising young man who's trying to choose between his sweet longtime girlfriend (Lori Loughlin) and a rich, obnoxious bombshell (Cari Shayne)--as though, in the middle of production, everyone began acting from a discarded "Melrose Place" script."
