= Peter Feibleman =

American screenwriter

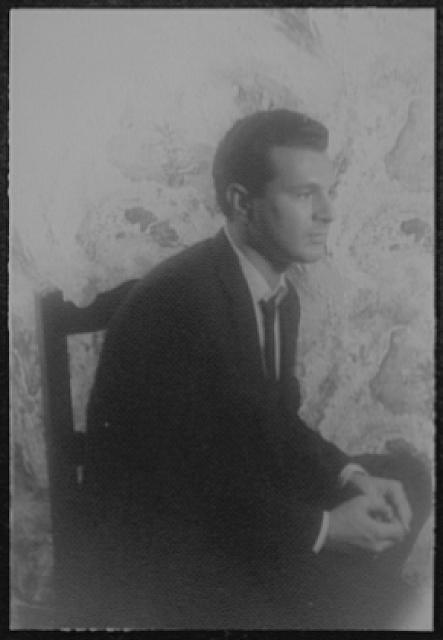
Peter Feibleman (1958) Photo by Carl Van Vechten

Peter Feibleman (August 1, 1930 – August 23, 2015) was an American author and screenwriter. He won critical acclaim for his novels and received multiple awards for his writings, including a Guggenheim Award in 1960 and a Golden Pen Award in 1983. He also wrote a number of plays and screenplays.

== Life ==
Feibleman was born in 1930 in New York City to James Kern Feibleman, an author and university professor, and Dorothy Steinam. He was raised in New Orleans. He studied acting at the Carnegie Institute of Technology and also attended Columbia University. He was a member of P.E.N. and resided in Los Angeles.

== Career ==
Starting in 1940, Feibleman worked as an actor in radio. From 1951 to 1957, he worked as an actor in Spain. He began writing in 1958. Feibleman was a co-founder of DBA, a screenplay consulting firm. Feibleman finished his first literary work, A Place without Twilight, in 1958. The book was met with critical acclaim by the Saturday Review and other publications. Many of his other works were received well by critics.

== Relationship with Lillian Hellman ==
Feibleman was Lillian Hellman's long-time lover and friend, although she was older than his own mother. He was the dedicatee of Pentimento, and was her principal heir and literary executor.

== Awards ==
- Guggenheim Award for creative writing (1960)
- Golden Pen Award for screenwriting (1983)

== Selected bibliography ==
=== Memoir ===
- Lilly: Reminiscences of Lillian Hellman (1988)

=== Novels ===
- A Place without Twilight (1958)
- The Daughters of Necessity (1959)
- Strangers and Graves: Four Short Novels (Death of Danaues, Fever, Along the Coast, Eyes) (1966)
- The Columbus Tree (1973)
- Charlie Boy (1980)

=== Other writings ===
- Tiger, Tiger Burning Bright (based on A Place without Twilight, 1962)
- Ensign Pulver (screenplay, 1964)
- Profiles in Courage (TV series, 1964, episode 2 "Mary S. McDowell")
- His Eye is On the Sparrow (screenplay, 1969)
- The Bayous (1973)
- Columbo (TV series, 1976, season 6, episode 1 "Fade in to Murder" & episode 2 "Old Fashioned Murder")
- Maid in America (TV movie, 1982)
- Cakewalk (play, 1998)

== Sources ==
- Contemporary Authors Online, Gale, 2009. Reproduced in Biography Resource Center. Farmington Hills, Michigan, Gale, 2009
- Peter Feibleman profile at the Biography Reference Bank
