= Ernest J. Gaines =

African-American author (1933–2019)

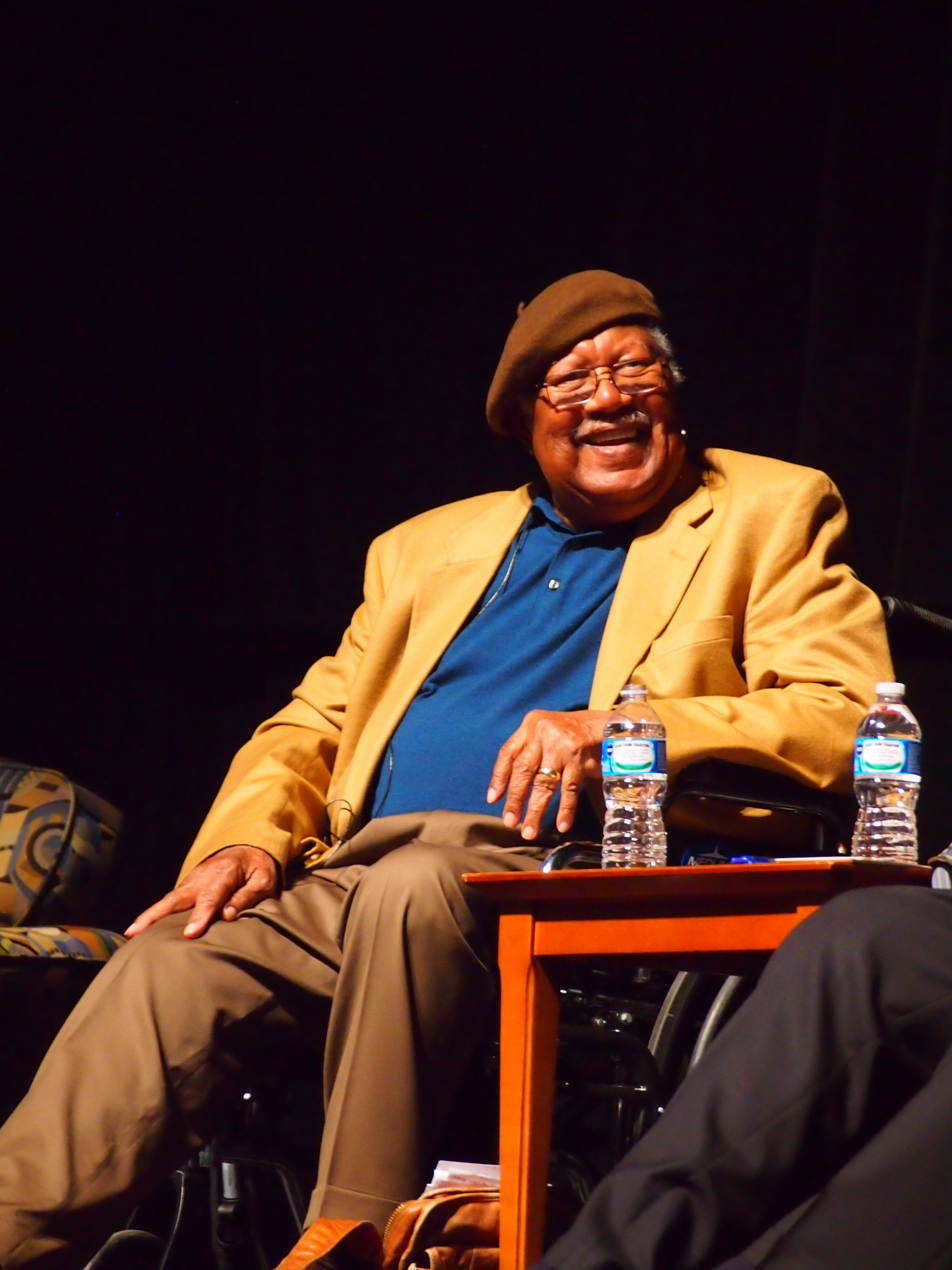
- Gaines in 2015
- Born: Ernest James Gaines; January 15, 1933; Oscar, Louisiana, U.S.
- Died: November 5, 2019 (aged 86); Oscar, Louisiana, U.S.
- Occupations: Writer; Author; Professor; Lecturer
- Spouse: Dianne Saulney (m. 1993)
- Writing career
- Notable works: A Lesson Before Dying; The Autobiography of Miss Jane Pittman; A Gathering of Old Men
- Notable awards: National Humanities Medal; Ordre des Arts et des Lettres

Ernest James Gaines (January 15, 1933 – November 5, 2019) was an American author.

Born in Louisiana, Gaines spent his early life living on the Riverlake Plantation before moving to California and later serving in the United States Army. Over the course of his life, Gaines worked a variety of temporary jobs to support his life as a writer. His works include themes such as race, family, community, and humanity.

His 1993 novel, A Lesson Before Dying, won the National Book Critics Circle Award for fiction. Gaines was a MacArthur Foundation fellow, was awarded the National Humanities Medal, and was inducted into the French Ordre des Arts et des Lettres (Order of Arts and Letters) as a Chevalier.

Four of his works have been made into television movies.

== Early life ==
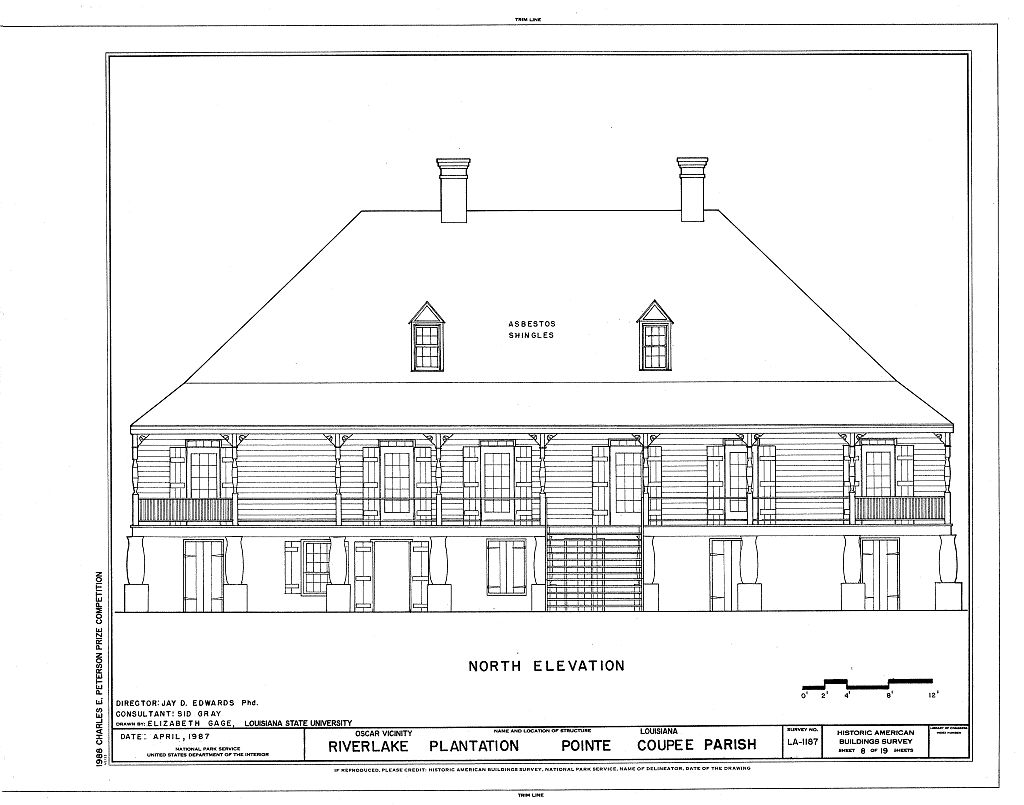
The Riverlake Plantation in Oscar, Point Coupee Parish, LA.

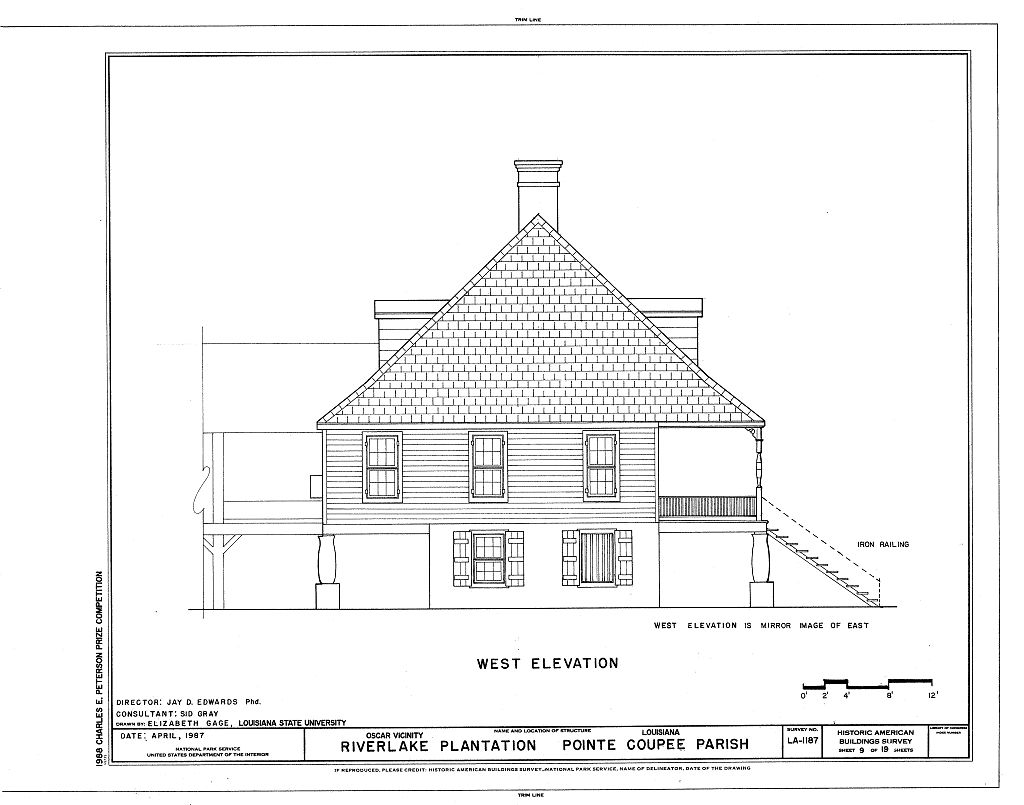
West Elevation.

Gaines was among the fifth generation of his sharecropper family to be born on the Riverlake Plantation in Pointe Coupee Parish, Louisiana. That became the setting and premise for many of his later works. The oldest of 12 children, he was raised by his disabled great aunt, Miss Augusteen Jefferson, whose legs were paralyzed. According to A Gathering of Gaines by Anne K. Simpson, she chose to crawl using her upper body rather than use a welfare-donated wheelchair. Her considerable influence on Gaines and his writing is a recurring topic in interviews with him and---in an interview from the Southwestern Review in 1978---Gaines credits her as having "'the greatest impact on [his] life, not only as a writer but as a man". Although born generations after the end of slavery, Gaines grew up impoverished, living in the old slave quarters on the plantation.

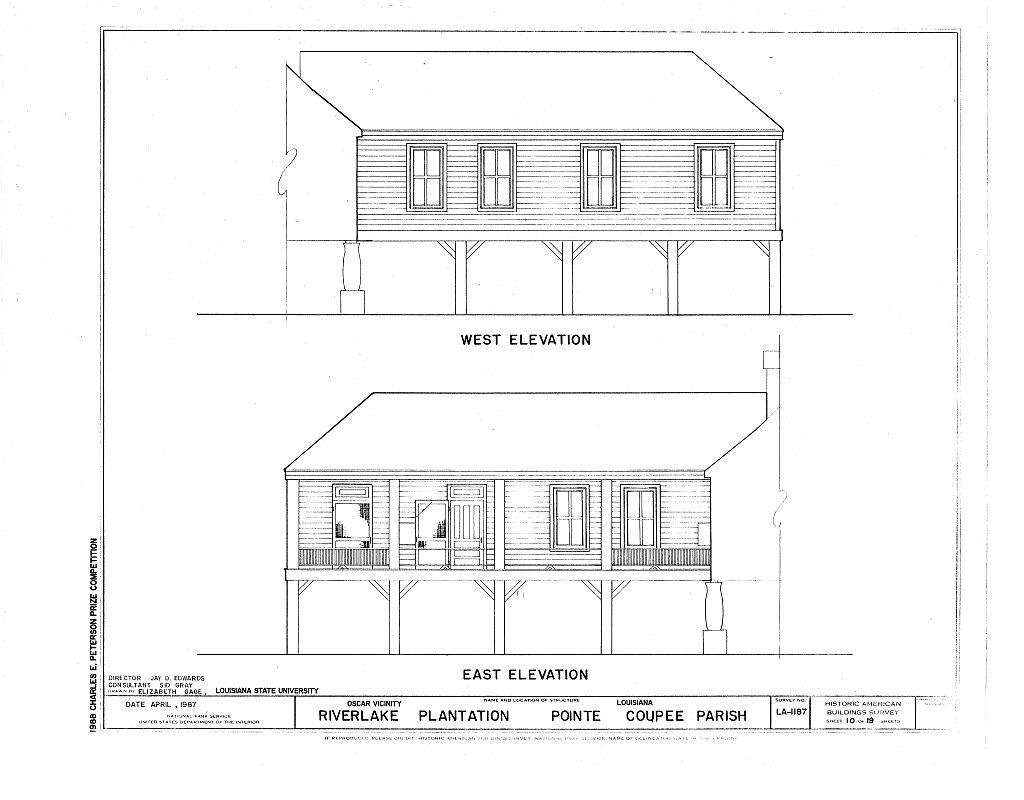
West and East Elevations.

Gaines's first years of school took place in the plantation church. When the children were not picking cotton in the fields, a visiting teacher came for five to six months of the year to provide basic education. Gaines then spent three years at St. Augustine School, a Catholic school for African Americans in New Roads, Louisiana. Schooling for African-American children did not continue beyond the eighth grade during this time in Pointe Coupee Parish.

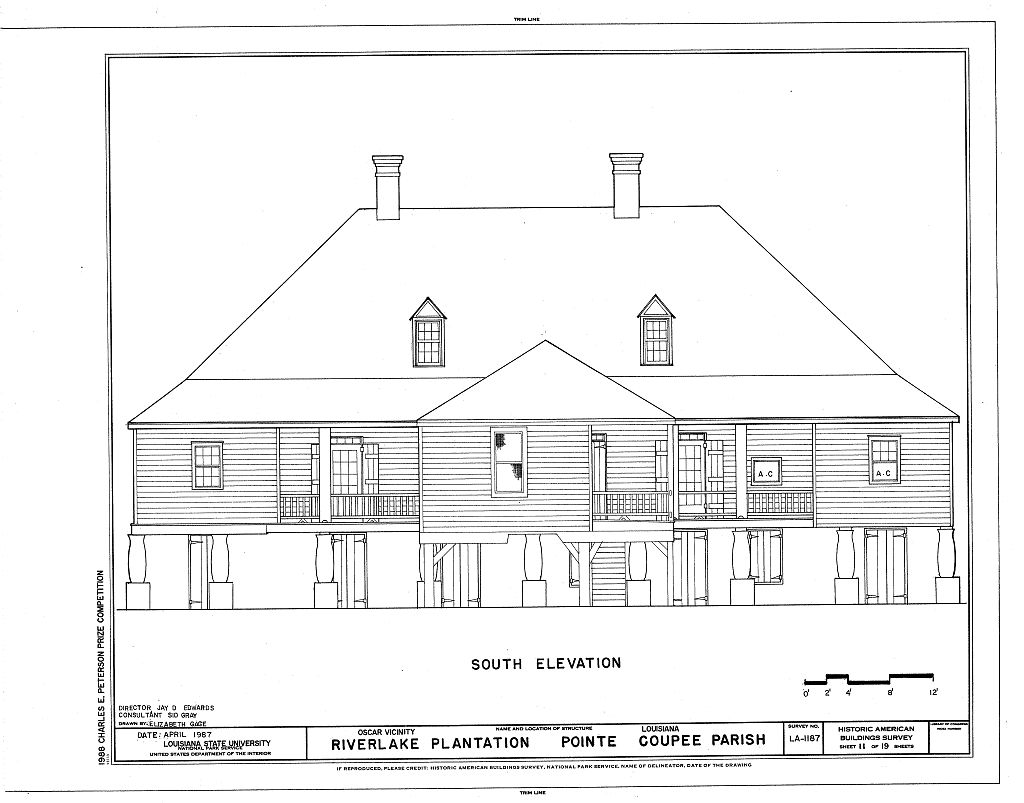
South Elevation.

When he was 15 years old, Gaines moved to Vallejo, California, to join his mother and stepfather, who had left Louisiana during World War II. He wrote his first novel at 16 while he was babysitting his youngest brother Michael. According to one account, he wrapped it in brown paper, tied it with string, and sent it to a New York publisher, who rejected it. After the parcel containing his manuscript was returned to him---rejection slip enclosed---Gaines incinerated that first copy, page by page, but later rewrote the novel, which became his first published book, Catherine Carmier.

== Education ==
=== College ===
In 1951, after graduating from high school and as the first male in his family to do so, Gaines enrolled at Vallejo Junior College. After studying there for two years, Gaines received an Associate of Arts in journalism. He was then drafted by the United States Army, completed basic training, and served a two-year stint in Guam before being discharged in 1955. While stationed in Guam, Gaines entered a writing competition organized by the U.S. Far East Command in Japan and was awarded two monetary prizes for the short stories he submitted. Then, in the Fall of 1955, Gaines used a $110-a-month military stipend provided to him through the G.I. Bill to enroll at San Francisco State University (SFSU). There is contradictory information as to what Gaines studied while there. According to Simpson, he studied English and social studies. However, in Ernest J. Gaines: A Critical Companion, Karen Carmean wrote that Gaines studied language arts as his major with a minor in English literature.

In 1956, Gaines published his first short story, "The Turtles", in a college magazine at SFSU.

=== Stanford University ===
In 1957, Gaines graduated from SFSU with a Bachelor of Arts in Language Arts. That same year, Gaines became a fellow after he submitted three of his stories for consideration for the Wallace Stegner Creative Writing Fellowship at Stanford University. During his time there, his professors offered constructive feedback that would impact his overall writing style. This, too, was the year that Gaines gave himself a driving ultimatum: ten years to become a successful writer and to decide whether or not he was satisfied with his accomplishments. According to Gaines, it was exactly ten years later that he started to make it as a professional writer.

=== After Stanford ===
In 1959, Gaines then returned to his previously failed attempt at writing Catherine Carmier and based on that work, went on to win the Joseph Henry Jackson Award for "Best Novel-in-Progress". This same year, he began working with Dorothea Oppenheimer, then an editor, who would later become his literary agent. Over the years, the two would become close, maintaining a relationship of mutual faith and friendship until her death in 1987. Between 1959 and 1964 were lean years for him: living on $175 per month, Gaines himself said during an interview that, though he only had enough money for his immediate, basic needs, "'No one twisted my arm to be a writer, I chose it.'" During this time, he worked a number of temporary jobs. Then, in 1964, Gaines published Catherine Carmier, his first novel.

From 1981 until retiring in 2004, Gaines was a Writer-in-Residence at the University of Louisiana at Lafayette. In 1996, Gaines spent a full semester as a visiting professor at the University of Rennes in France, where he taught the first creative writing class ever offered in the French university system.

In the final years of his life, Gaines lived on Louisiana Highway 1 in Oscar, Louisiana, where he and his wife, Dianne Gaines, built a home on part of the old plantation where he grew up. He had the building where he attended church and school moved to his property.

According to the website of the Ernest J. Gaines Center at the University of Louisiana at Lafayette, he "holds honorary doctorates from 19 universities". This is a more recent number compared to in Simpson's work, as at the time she wrote on him, he had five honorary degrees.

Gaines died from natural causes at his home on November 5, 2019. He was 86 years old.

== Personal life ==
During his college years, Gaines decided against marriage for himself. This, according to him, was because writers have a tendency to prioritize their work above all else. He would, however, later go on to marry Dianne Mary Gaines in 1993. The two had met in 1988 at the Miami International Book Fair. While the two would not have any children with one another, Gaines then became the stepfather of Dianne's four children from a previous marriage. According to Gaines, though he regretted not having any children of his own, that regret is tempered by his certainty that writing was his calling, and that in so answering that call he would not have been able to support a child.

Gaines, while raised Baptist as a child and having gone to Catholic school for three years while living in Louisiana, was not religious as an adult. His opinion on the topic was that, while religion was not for him, it played an important role in many people's lives and that it was important for people to have something "greater than them" to believe in.

His greatest literary influences were Hemingway and Faulkner, though he read a variety of authors including Turgenev, Tolstoy, and Chekov.

=== Appearance and personality ===
Due to his belief that "a strong body helps the mind to work," Gaines lived a healthy lifestyle. While talking, he often used hand gestures. Gaines has also been described as genuine, modest, and humane. In one interview, when asked what Gaines was proudest of, he responded "Being able to work, do my work---that I'm proud of." He was an avid reader and collector of books. When it came to his work, Gaines took a single-minded approach and accepted nothing less than what he believed was acceptable. According to an interview with Gaines in 1976, he was "About six feet tall, and stocky" and spoke without a Southern accent.

He valued respect, diligence, and accountability in both himself and those he interacted with both professionally and privately. Gaines was also known as someone who cared about others and was slow to anger to most things bar a couple of exceptions: namely, human injustice and, to a lesser degree, when the effort he put into his work was not reciprocated by those he worked with. He was praised highly by his students.

== Bibliography ==
Books

- Catherine Carmier (1964)
- Of Love and Dust (1967)
- Bloodline (1968)
- The Autobiography of Miss Jane Pittman (1971)
- A Long Day in November (1971)
- In My Father's House (1978)
- A Gathering of Old Men (1983)
- A Lesson Before Dying (1993) – nominated for Pulitzer Prize, National Book Critics Circle Award for fiction (1993); Oprah's Book Club (1997)
- Mozart and Leadbelly: Stories and Essays (2005)
- The Tragedy of Brady Sims (2017)

Short stories

- "The Turtles" (1956)
- "Boy in the Double-Breasted Suit" (1957)
- "Mary Louise" (1960)
- "Just Like a Tree" (1963)
- "The Sky Is Gray" (1963)
- "A Long Day in November" (1964)
- "My Grandpa and the Haint" (1966)
- "Christ Walked Down Market Street" (1984 - publish 2004)

Filmography

- The Autobiography of Miss Jane Pittman, CBS Television (1974) – Directors Guild of America Award, eight Emmy Awards, nominated for a BAFTA award
- The Sky Is Gray, American Short Story Series, PBS (1980)
- A Gathering of Old Men, CBS Television (1987)
- A Lesson Before Dying, HBO (1999); winner, Emmy Award for Outstanding Made For Television Movie

== Recognitions ==
=== Awards ===
- National Medal of Arts 2012
- Sidney Lanier Prize for Southern Literature (2012)
- American Academy of Achievement's Golden Plate Award (2001)
- The F. Scott Fitzgerald Award for Achievement in American Literature award that is given annually in Rockville, Maryland, the city where Fitzgerald, his wife, and his daughter are buried as part of the F. Scott Fitzgerald Literary Festival (2001).
- Chevalier (Knight) of the Order of Art and Letters (France) (2000)
- American Academy of Arts and Letters Department of Literature (2000)
- The Governor's Arts Award (2000)
- The Louisiana Writer Award (2000)
- National Humanities Medal (2000)
- National Book Critics Circle Award for Fiction (1993)
- John D. and Catherine T. MacArthur Foundation Fellow (1993)
- Dos Passos Prize (1993)
- Humanist of the Year Award (1989)
- Solomon R. Guggenheim Foundation Fellow (1971)
- National Endowment for the Arts grant (1967)
- Wallace Stegner Fellow (1957)
- Subject of a 2023 USPS Forever stamp from the Black Heritage series

=== Honorary Degrees ===
- Honorary Doctor of Humane Letters degree from Louisiana State University (1987)
- Honorary Doctor of Humane Letters (L.H.D.) degree from Whittier College (1986)
- Honorary Doctor of Letters degree from Bard College (1985)
- Honorary Doctor of Letters degree from Brown University (1984)
- Honorary Doctor of Letters degree from Denison University in Granville, Ohio (1980)

== Ernest J. Gaines Award for Literary Excellence ==
A book award established by donors of the Baton Rouge Area Foundation in 2007 to honor Gaines's legacy and encourage rising African-American fiction writers. The winner is selected by a panel of five judges who are well known in the literary world. The winner receives a US$10,000 award and a commemorative sculpture created by Louisiana artist Robert Moreland.

== See also ==
- Membership discrimination in California social clubs

== Sources ==
- The African American Registry
