= A Gathering of Old Men =

1983 novel by Ernest J. Gaines

- 1st edition hardback copy from 1983
- Author: Ernest J. Gaines
- Language: English
- Publisher: Knopf
- Publication date: 1983
- Publication place: United States
- Media type: Print (hardback)
- Pages: 213
- ISBN: 0-394-51468-8
- OCLC: 9682782
- Dewey Decimal: 813/.54 19
- LC Class: PS3557.A355 G3 1983

A Gathering of Old Men is a novel by Ernest J. Gaines published in 1983.

Set on a 1970s Louisiana cane farm, the novel addresses racial discrimination in the post-civil rights era South. The novel's title characters each admit to the murder of Beau, a Cajun farmer, in an effort to protect the guilty party, and view their stand as a development of their manhood.

== Plot summary ==
=== Chapters 1-6 ===
One afternoon, Candy Marshall, a white plantation owner, discovers that a white Cajun farmer, Beau Boutan, has been shot in the yard of a black man named Mathu. Being raised in part by Mathu, she feels the need to protect him. To do so, she enlists the help of seventeen other old Black men by telling them to come to Mathu's yard, each with a shotgun and one empty number 5 shell. Within a few hours of discovering Beau's body, nearly every male member of the Black community at Marshall is there. Candy and the men all claim to be responsible for the murder in an effort to protect the guilty party.

=== Chapters 7-15 ===
Sheriff Mapes arrives to the scene to arrest Mathu, whom Mapes believes to be the murderer. The sheriff also wishes to keep Beau's father, Fix Boutan, from coming to lynch Mathu, who he presumes killed Beau. Lou Dimes, Candy's boyfriend, also shows up, and tries getting Candy to stop protecting Mathu.

Meanwhile, Fix's son Gil, who happens to be a standout football player at LSU, heads home from Baton Rouge to try to convince Fix not to go to Marshall to seek revenge. Gil meets with his father and a group of other Cajuns in their house. Luke Will, a vigilante with ties to the Ku Klux Klan, tries to get Fix to lead a party to the Marshall plantation.

Back at Marshall, Sheriff Mapes gets word that Fix isn't planning on showing up. When he tells the others, Mathu agrees to head to jail for the murder of Beau. Many of the old men aren't happy about this, as they had been loading ammo into their guns and hoping to make a stand. After discussing with the others, Big Charlie finally admits to killing Beau, which he did in self-defense. He asks to be referred to as Mr. Biggs, and agrees to go in.

=== Chapters 16-20 ===
After getting his group drunk at a bar, Luke Will shows up, his men armed with guns of their own. Mapes finds himself on the ground rather quickly, and a firefight ensues. By the end, one of Luke's men is wounded, and both Charlie and Luke are killed. The case goes to trial, and the judge gives all of the men a five year probation.

== Major characters ==
- Candy Marshall - the organizer of the group of old men, and sees herself as their protector. She was raised together by Mathu and Miss Merle and is a partial owner of the Marshall plantation.
- Mathu - Beau’s alleged killer for most of the novel, perceived as the only one willing to stand up to him. Mathu is in his 80s, has a white beard, and wears a dirty white t-shirt with green pants.
- Mr. Charlie Biggs - Beau’s true killer who admits to his crime only at the end of the novel. Originally referred simply as Charlie, after coming forward he asks to be called Mr. Biggs as a symbol of his newfound manhood.
- Sheriff Mapes - a sixty-year-old, heavy-set sheriff who uses violence while trying to interrogate the old men. Mapes had a strong friendship with Mathu, and he tries to get Fix to stay home.
- Lou Dimes - a newspaperman from Baton Rouge and Candy’s boyfriend. He stands out from the other men in his relatively-liberal behavior towards Candy, which leads Mapes to question his manhood.
- Beau Boutan - the man murdered at the start of the novel. Charlie recounts that Beau began to hit him with a stalk of cane, and when Charlie hit back, Beau pulled out his shotgun. Charlie kills him before Beau can get him.
- Fix Boutan - Beau's father. Fix is the patriarch of a poor Cajun family who wants to kill Mathu to maintain his family's honor. Fix is disheartened when Gil Boutan tells him not to do so.
- Luke Will - head of vigilante group that seeks revenge for Beau’s death when Fix won't. He has his group get drunk at a bar before going to the Marshall plantation.

== Major themes ==
=== Manhood ===
A Gathering of Old Men's namesake characters can be contrasted with Native Son's Bigger Thomas. While Bigger Thomas was driven to commit murder, the old men in Gaines’s novel react in a constructive manner. In making this change, Gaines de-emphasizes violence as a component of black manhood, and instead emphasizes their unified voice and community.

=== Racial Interdependence ===
Racial interdependence between the Black, Cajun, and other white populations is a prominent theme in the novel. Miss Merle and Mathu raise Candy jointly when her family is unable. Additionally, Beau's brother plays on the LSU football team, where he and a Black player are nicknamed “salt and pepper”, and must work together to defeat Ole Miss.

== Symbolism ==
=== Marshall's Tractor ===
The Marshall’s tractor becomes a symbol of the change that the men have experienced in their life. Originally, the older Black men would work the fields, and gained a sense of community from doing so. Over time, when Cajuns that also share-cropped started to use tractors, fewer and fewer of the older Black men would work on the plantation. Eventually, the younger members of the community left for the cities of for the North, and many of the older members began to die.

== Film adaptation ==
In 1987 Volker Schlöndorff, a famous German director, made a film, also titled A Gathering of Old Men (aka Murder on the Bayou), which adheres closely to the novel. It stars Richard Widmark (as Sheriff Mapes), Louis Gossett Jr. (as Mathu), Holly Hunter (as Candy), Joe Seneca (as Clatoo), and Will Patton (as Lou Dimes).
