= Dianne Gaines =

American attorney and civic activist

- Born: September 29, 1940 (age 84); New Orleans, Louisiana, U.S.
- Education: Xavier University Preparatory School; Xavier University of Louisiana; University of Miami School of Law (JD)
- Occupations: Attorney; civic activist
- Spouses: John Andrew Smith; Ernest J. Gaines (m. 1993–2019)
- Children: 4
- Parent(s): René Saulney; Anita Prevost Saulney

Dianne Saulney Gaines is an American attorney and civic activist known for her contributions to the legal profession and civil rights advocacy. She is the first Black lawyer elected to the Florida Bar Board of Governors.

== Early life and education ==
Dianne Mary Saulney was born in New Orleans, Louisiana, on September 29, 1940, to René Saulney and Anita Prevost Saulney. During her time at Xavier University Preparatory School in 1957, she authored an opinion piece in The Louisiana Weekly discussing racial unrest in the South. She attended Xavier University in New Orleans for her undergraduate studies.

After completing her undergraduate education at Xavier University in 1962, she married John Andrew Smith on July 21, 1962, then embarked on a career in teaching in Miami, Florida at George Washington Carver Junior and Senior High School in Coconut Grove. She left teaching after “[s]uffering a disparate wage system for [B]lack teachers,” who were paid less than White teachers. After the birth of her first child, she became a counselor for the Neighborhood Youth Corp, a federal work-study program aimed at providing employment opportunities to disadvantaged youth.

== Career and advocacy ==
Inspired by the landmark Brown v. Board of Education Supreme Court decision and driven by a desire to fight for civil rights and equality, Gaines decided to pursue a legal education. In 1968, following the passage of the Fair Housing Act, she became the first Black realtor to work for the Keyes Company, the area's largest white-owned realty company, where she helped to integrate some neighborhoods. Her family integrated the Greenbriar subdivision in South Dade in 1970.

Gaines was also a member of the Panel of American Women, where Black, White, Hispanic, Catholic, Jewish and Protestant women conducted programs on religion, race and culture for schools and organizations in Dade County for 13 years.

In 1977, at the age of 37, Gaines enrolled in the University of Miami School of Law and earned her Juris Doctor degree in 1980. She became a member of The Florida Bar in 1980. Following her graduation, she worked as an assistant county attorney for the Miami-Dade County Attorney's Office as a public finance specialist and bond counsel.

In 1985, Gaines founded the Gwen S. Cherry Black Women Lawyers Association, an organization empowering and supporting Black women in the legal profession by addressing issues of racial and gender discrimination within the legal community and promoting the professional development of Black women attorneys. By 1987, the organization was providing stipends for 10 Black, White and Asian high school students to work as judicial pages with Black women lawyers serving as the students' mentors.

In 1987, Gaines was elected president of the Florida Chapter of the National Bar Association, the Black lawyers' voluntary professional organization. As president, she learned that she held a non-voting seat on the Florida Bar Board of Governors, which inspired her to take a more active role on the Florida Bar Board of Governors.

In 1990, Gaines became the first Black lawyer elected to the Florida Bar Board of Governors, a 51-member board. Gaines was the seventh woman to serve on the board. Gaines was sworn in office June 16, 1990 at the Florida Bar Convention.

In 1991, Gaines served as special counsel to Senator Bob Graham in Washington, D.C. In 1993, Graham named Gaines to chair the Southern District of Florida's Federal Judicial Nominating Commission.

In addition to the above, Gaines was also former vice president of the Black Lawyers Association, former member of the board of directors of the Florida Association of Women Lawyers (Dade County), membership chairperson of the Dade County Bar Association, chair of the board of directors of the City of Miami Off-Street Parking Authority, member of the Bi-racial/Tri-ethnic Advisory Committee to the U.S. District Court, Southern District of Florida, member of the United Way board of Directors, secretary-treasurer of the New Horizons Foundation, and advisory board of St. Francis Xavier School in Overtown Miami.

As of January, 2024, Gaines' Florida Bar status was listed as delinquent and thus not eligible to practice law in Florida.

== Personal life ==
In 1993, Gaines married author Ernest J. Gaines, and eventually moved to Louisiana. She has four children, Jonathan, Maria, Jennifer and Stephen, from an earlier marriage to John Andrew Smith, an artist.
