= The Autobiography of Miss Jane Pittman =

1971 novel by Ernest J. Gaines

- Author: Ernest J. Gaines
- Language: English
- Genre: Historical fiction
- Publisher: Dial Press (1971); Bantam Books (1972)
- Publication date: 1971
- Pages: 259

The Autobiography of Miss Jane Pittman is a 1971 novel by Ernest J. Gaines. The story depicts the struggles of Black people as seen through the eyes of the narrator, a woman named Jane Pittman. She tells of the major events of her life from the time she was a young slave girl in the American South at the end of the Civil War.

The novel was dramatized in a TV movie in 1974, starring Cicely Tyson.

== Realistic fiction novel ==
The novel, and its main character, are particularly notable for the breadth of time, history and stories they recall. In addition to the plethora of fictional characters who populate Jane's narrative, Jane and others make many references to historical events and figures over the nearly hundred years Miss Jane can recall. In addition to its obvious opening in the American Civil War, Jane alludes to the Spanish–American War and her narrative spans across both World Wars and the beginning of the Vietnam War. Jane and other characters also mention Frederick Douglass, Booker T. Washington, Jackie Robinson, Fred Shuttlesworth, Rosa Parks, and others. Corporal Brown's voice give these historical meditations a kind of "setting the record straight" mood to the storytelling presented in this novel. For instance, an entire section is dedicated to Huey P. Long in which Miss Jane explains "Oh, they got all kinds of stories about her now .... When I hear them talk like that I think, 'Ha. You ought to been here twenty-five, thirty years ago. You ought to been here when poor people had nothing.'" Because of the historical content, some readers thought the book was non-fiction. Gaines commented:

Some people have asked me whether or not The Autobiography of Miss Jane Pittman is fiction or nonfiction. It is fiction. When Dial Press first sent it out, they did not put "a novel" on the galleys or on the dustjacket, so a lot of people had the feeling that it could have been real. ... I did a lot of research in books to give some facts to what Miss Jane could talk about, but these are my creations. I read quite a few interviews performed with former slaves by the WPA during the thirties and I got their rhythm and how they said certain things. But I never interviewed anybody.

== Motifs ==
=== "Slavery again" ===
The novel, which begins with a protagonist in slavery being freed and leaving the plantation only to return to another plantation as a sharecropper, stresses the similarities between the conditions of African Americans in slavery and African Americans in the sharecropping plantation. The novel shows how formerly enslaved people lived after freedom. It shows how the patrollers and other vigilante groups through violence and terror curtailed the physical and educational mobility of African Americans in the south. Access to schools and political participation was shut down by plantation owners. Between physical limitations, not having money, and having to deal with ambivalent and hostile figures, Jane and Ned's travels don't take them very far physically (they do not leave Louisiana) nor in lifestyle. At the end of the chapter "A Flicker of Light; And Again Darkness", Miss Jane remarks of Colonel Dye's plantation, "It was slavery again, all right". In the depiction of Miss Jane's telling of the story, Jim, the child of sharecroppers parallels if not resoundingly echoes the earlier story of Ned, the child born on a slave plantation. Through these stories the novel further highlights the conditions of Louisiana sharecropping in relationship to the conditions of slavery.

== Film adaptation ==
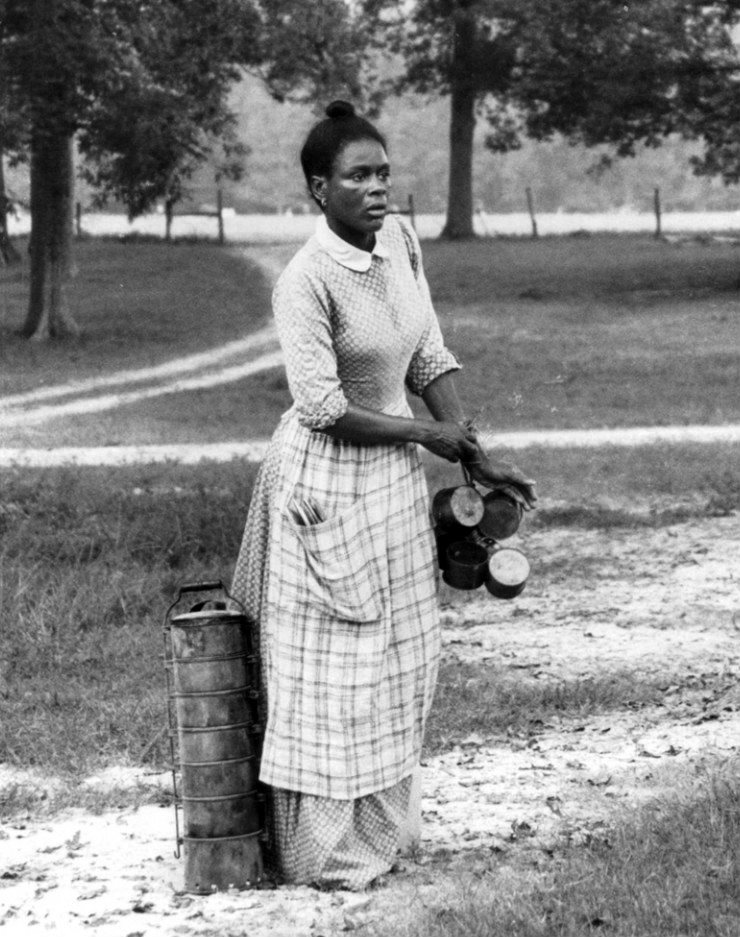
Cicely Tyson as Jane Pittman, 1974.

The book was made into an award-winning television movie, The Autobiography of Miss Jane Pittman, broadcast on CBS in 1974. The film holds importance as one of the first made-for-TV movies to deal with African-American characters with depth and sympathy. It preceded the ground-breaking television miniseries Roots by three years. The film culminates with Miss Pittman joining the civil rights movement in 1962 at age 110.

The movie was directed by John Korty; the screenplay was written by Tracy Keenan Wynn and executive produced by Roger Gimbel. It starred Cicely Tyson in the lead role, as well as Michael Murphy, Richard Dysart, Katherine Helmond and Odetta. The film was shot in Baton Rouge, Louisiana and was notable for its use of very realistic special effects makeup by Stan Winston and Rick Baker for the lead character, who is shown from ages 23 to 110. The television movie is currently distributed through Classic Media. The film won nine Emmy Awards in 1974 including Best Actress of the Year, Best Lead Actress in a Drama, Best Directing in a Drama, and Best Writing in Drama.

=== Differences between the novel and film ===
Preceding Alex Haley's miniseries Roots, the film was one of the first films to take seriously depictions of African Americans in the plantation south. The film, like the book, also suggests a comparison between the contemporary moment of the Civil Rights Movement and the plight of African Americans at various points in history. The film, however, has some noticeable divergences from the novel. In the film the person who interviews Miss Jane is white (played by Michael Murphy). There is no indication of the interviewer's race in the novel. In fact after the first couple of pages the interviewer completely falls out of the frame of the story though he continues to appear between flashbacks in the film. The film also opens with the book's final story about Jimmy coming to an almost 110-years-old Miss Jane to ask for her participation in a Civil Rights demonstration. The film appears to be a series of flashbacks that happen during this time of Jimmy's Civil Rights organizing. In the novel, Corporal Brown gives Jane her name. Originally she had been called Ticey. The Corporal exclaims that "Ticey" is a slave name but then declares "I'll call you Jane" after his own girl back in Ohio. In the film however, Corporal Brown only suggests the name "Jane" as one option in a list of potential names, so that it is Jane who says "I like 'Jane'". The movie never shows Tee Bob killing himself.
