= Carry Me Back to Morningside Heights =

Play by Robert Alan Aurthur

- Playbill cover from 1968 Broadway production
- Written by: Robert Alan Aurthur
- Original language: English
- Subject: race relations
- Genre: comedy

Premiere
- Date premiered: 27 February 1968
- Place premiered: John Golden Theatre, New York

Carry Me Back to Morningside Heights is an American play about a young Jewish man who insists on becoming a slave to an African-American law student as a personal penance for the years of wrongs whites have done to blacks. It was written by Robert Alan Aurthur and premiered on Broadway in 1968, where it ran for seven performances.

== Plot ==
A Jewish civil rights worker, Seymour Levin, plagued by white guilt, he offers his services to a Black law student, Willie Nurse, as a slave as recompense for American slavery. Levin is more and more exploited by Nurse until Levin is chained to a radiator and Nurse's fiancée sexually assaults him.

Carry Me Back to Morningside Heights is a three-act comedy play. It takes place at an apartment in Morningside Heights, Manhattan.

== Production history ==
The 1968 Broadway production was directed by Sidney Poitier and was produced by Saint Subber in association with Harold Loeb. There were five roles in the play – Louis Gossett as Willie Nurse, David Steinberg as Seymour Levin, Johnny Born as Henry Hardy, Cicely Tyson as Myrna Jessup, and Diane Ladd as Alma Sue Bates.

The show had one preview and opened on February 27, 1968. It ran for seven performances at the John Golden Theatre, closing on March 2, 1968.

== Critical reception ==
Carry Me Back to Morningside Heights was widely panned. The New Yorker described it as "however inadvertently, anti-white, anti-black, and anti-Semetic." The New York Times called the play racially insensitive and critiqued the poor writing. In his memoir, director Sidney Poitier said "the play didn't work – not on any level. The critics dumped on the writing and the direction, but most of all, the direction." The play was profiled in the William Goldman book The Season: A Candid Look at Broadway.
