= Tiger, Tiger Burning Bright =

1962 Broadway play by Peter Feibleman

- Original language: English
- Written by: Peter Feibleman
- Genre: Drama
- Setting: New Orleans, Mama's house, early 1950s.

Premiere
- Date: 1962

Tiger, Tiger Burning Bright is a dramatic stage play written by American playwright Peter Feibleman. The play premiered on Broadway at the Booth Theatre in 1962. Claudia McNeil was nominated for the Tony Award for Best Actress in a Play for her performance in the production. Critically acclaimed, the play closed after only 33 performances, which was blamed on the 1962–1963 New York City newspaper strike. The play is a stage adaptation of Feibleman's novel A Place Without Twilight, first published in 1958. The title is taken from the poem by William Blake first published in 1794, titled The Tyger.

== Characters ==
- Mama Morris: the family matriarch, a widow
- Clarence Morris: her son, aged 23
- Dan Morris: her younger son, aged 19
- Lucille Morris: her daughter, aged 18
- Adelaide Smith: a friend of the family, aged 23
- Sittre Morris: uncle, and deacon of the Riverview Baptist Church, late forties
- Celeste Chipley: the girl who lives next door, aged 19
- Dewey Chipley: Celeste's brother, aged 21
- Mr. Keres: a white man, late thirties
- Sergeant Jameson: a soldier
- First Neighbor : neighbor of the Morris family
- Second Neighbor : neighbor of the Morris family

== Original casts ==
Character	Original Broadway cast (1962)
Mama Morris	Claudia McNeil
Clarence Morris	Alvin Ailey
Dan Morris	Al Freeman Jr.
Lucille Morris	Ellen Holly
Adelaide Smith	Diana Sands
Sittre Morris	Roscoe Lee Browne
Celeste Chipley	Cicely Tyson
Dewey Chipley	Robert Hooks
Mr. Keres	Paul Barry
Sergeant Jameson	Robert Macbeth
First Neighbor	Janet MacLachlan
Second Neighbor	Rudy Challenger

== Production history ==
The show opened on Broadway at the Booth Theatre on December 22, 1962, and closed on January 19, 1963, after 33 performances. The play was nominated for one Tony Award for Claudia McNeil for Best Lead Actress in a Play. The show was directed by Joshua Logan and costumes were designed by Lucinda Ballard. Ruth Attaway and Billy Dee Williams were understudies in the production. According to The New York Times, the play was "fatally wounded by the newspaper strike in New York", which played a major role in the show closing early despite critical acclaim. The play was published in book form in 1963 following the Broadway production.

In 2012, the play was performed in Los Angeles by the Stella Adler Studio of Acting.
