= The Marva Collins Story =

- Screenplay by: Clifford Campion
- Directed by: Peter Levin
- Starring: Cicely Tyson; Morgan Freeman
- Narrated by: Ed Asner
- Theme music composer: Fred Karlin
- Country of origin: United States
- Original language: English

Production
- Executive producer: Marian Rees
- Producer: Conrad Holzgang
- Cinematography: Don H. Birnkrant
- Editor: Marjorie Fowler
- Running time: 100 minutes
- Production companies: Hallmark Hall of Fame; NRW Features

Original release
- Network: CBS
- Release: December 1, 1981

The Marva Collins Story is a 1981 American Hallmark Hall of Fame television film about the life of Chicago-based African-American teacher Marva Collins. It stars Cicely Tyson as Collins and Morgan Freeman as her husband, Clarence.

== Plot ==
Marva Collins is a teacher in the Chicago Public School System. She expresses her dissatisfaction to how the schools are currently run, and believes that the system prevents children from reaching their full potential. She convinces her husband, Clarence, to help her start her own school by converting the upstairs apartment of their home into a one room school house. When inquiring about getting a permit to do so, she is appalled to learn that anyone can start a school, but in order to be recognized by the state, she would have to submit an application. She decides that she does not need the state's help, stating that she does not want anyone telling her how to teach, but is warned that many parents would not want to enroll their children in an unrecognized school. Collins uses her life savings to finance the school, and states that students will only be expected to pay what they can. She names the school Westside Preparatory.

On the first day of school, there are six students: Cindy and Patty, two of Collins' own children, Eddie, a student from Collins' Public School Class, Martin, a troubled child whom Collins knew from her Public School and recruited after he threw rocks at her window, Tina, whose mother, upon learning that Tina could not read or write despite being in the fifth grade, brought her to Collins, and Roxanne, a child who also cannot read. At first, many of the children lack confidence, especially when they learn that they will be expected to read difficult books, memorize poetry, and write daily themes. Over time, Collins gains their trust, praising them for everything they do right rather than reprimanding them for getting wrong answers, even getting the unconfident Tina and the difficult Martin to become excited about learning. Eventually, the school gains more students, many of whom public schools considered learning disabled.

Collins returns to the courthouse to inquire about gaining state recognition, as she discovers that there are parents who will not send their children to her unrecognized school, only to discover that the forms she had previously worked hours filling out were lost. She states that she does not need recognition, and that she will have her students take the hardest standardized test available to show what they have learned. The clerk tells her that her class of minorities put her at a disadvantage, angering Collins further. She states that she does not care about statistics and will have the scores published to prove what her students can do.

A police officer Collins had been avoiding for months eventually catches up with her and must inspect her class. He is impressed at how advanced the children are for their age, however; the school needs major safety improvements, which Collins cannot afford. The officer tells her he will wait several weeks before filing the report to give her time to make them. Collins loses her first student when Eddie's mother pulls him out of school, stating that school consumes his life. This deeply upsets Collins and makes her question if she is pushing the children too hard, but after a talk with her husband, she is assured she is doing the right thing, and continues challenging her students.

One day, a reporter comes to do a story on the school, and is impressed at how much the children know. He assumes that Collins has personally chosen advanced children from the city, and is shocked to learn that Collins knew few of the children before their first day of school, and many had been failing in learning disability classes. He is equally surprised to learn that Collins does not accept federal funds, and that her secret to success is just "good old fashioned teaching." Collins tells the reporter about the upcoming standardized testing, and invites him back to see for himself how well her students can score.

On the day of the test, Tina comes to school late, and expresses her fears of either failing the test and letting Collins down or passing and having to leave Westside Preparatory. Collins assures her that she is ready, and that if she is ready to leave the school, she must, as the purpose of Westside Preparatory is "learning to stand on your own." After the children test, the newspaper story is published. Collins is very pleased with the results, and the article brings attention to the school. She is quickly overwhelmed with donation money and calls from parents to see about enrolling their children. The children plan a party Ms. Collins after she writes them each a letter expressing how pleased she is with their test scores. The narrator closes the film by explaining that all of the students tested at least five grade levels higher, and that many of them went on to perform well in school throughout their lives. Westside Preparatory School eventually moved into its own building with 200 students and a waiting list of over 800.

== Cast ==
- Cicely Tyson as Marva Collins
- Morgan Freeman as Clarence Collins
- Roderick Wimberly as Martin Luther Jones
- Mashaune Hardy as Cindy Collins
- Brett Bouldin as Patrick Collins
- Samuel Muhammad Jr. as Eric Collins
- Dianne Kirksey as Cynthia Rawls
- Frankie Hill as Ida Banbower
- Marsha Warfield as Lela Boland
- Jimmie F. Skaggs as Chester Boland
- Duke Thorbs as Eddie Banbower
- Ed Asner as Narrator

== Accolades ==
Tyson's performance garnered her a nomination for the Primetime Emmy Award for Outstanding Lead Actress in a Limited Series or Movie.
