= Marva Collins =

American educator

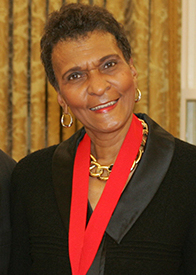
- Collins in 2004
- Born: Marva Delores Knight; August 31, 1936; Monroeville, Alabama, U.S.
- Died: June 24, 2015 (aged 78); Beaufort County, South Carolina, U.S.
- Other name: Marva King
- Education: Clark Atlanta University
- Occupation: Educator
- Years active: 1957–2008
- Known for: Creating Westside Preparatory School in Chicago's Garfield Park neighborhood in 1975.
- Spouse: Clarence Collins (m. 1960; died 1995)
- Children: 3

Marva Delores Collins (née Knight; August 31, 1936 – June 24, 2015) was an American educator. Collins is best known for creating Westside Preparatory School, a widely acclaimed private elementary school in the impoverished Garfield Park neighborhood of Chicago, Illinois, which opened in 1975.

== Early life ==
Collins was born in Monroeville, Alabama, to father, Henry Knight, a businessman who owned a funeral home and worked with cattle, and to mother, Bessie Knight (née Nettles). She grew up in Atmore, Alabama, a small town near Mobile, Alabama, during the time of segregation in the American South. When she was young, Collins went to a strict elementary school in a one-room schoolhouse in Atmore, an experience which influenced her later in life. She graduated from Clark College (now known as Clark Atlanta University) in Atlanta, Georgia.

== Career ==
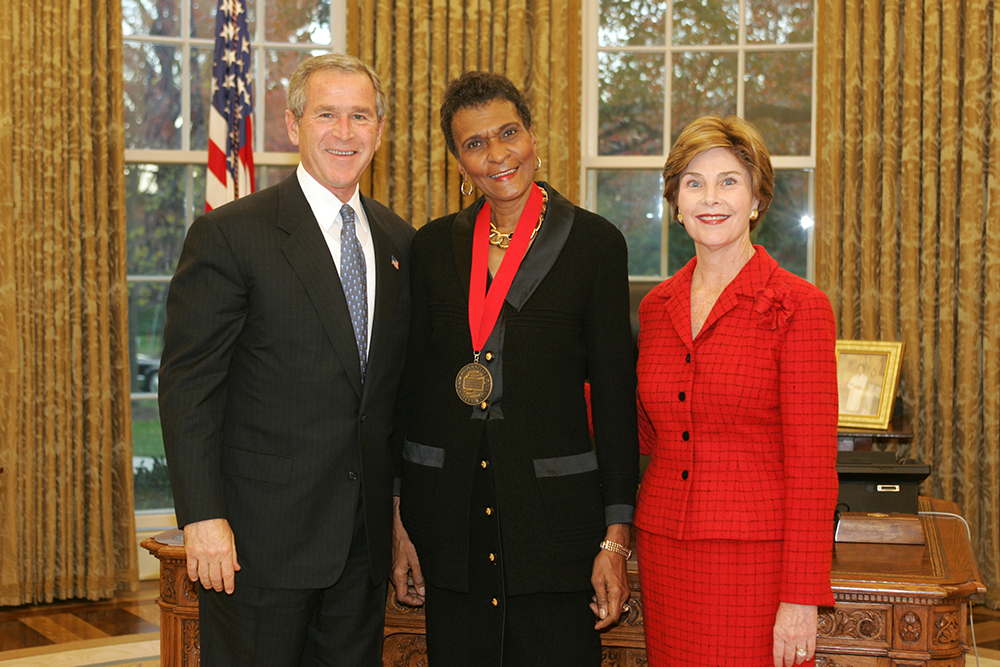
Collins with President George W. Bush and First Lady Laura Bush in 2004

Collins taught school for two years at the Monroe County Training School (now known as J.F. Shields School) in Beatrice, Alabama, then moved to Chicago in 1959, where she taught as a full–time substitute teacher in inner–city Chicago Public Schools system for fourteen years.

=== Westside Preparatory School ===
Dismayed at the low levels of learning that she felt some students were experiencing in particular areas, Collins took $5,000 ($25,910 in 2021 dollars) from her own teacher's retirement fund and started a private school on the top floors of the brownstone in the West Garfield Park neighborhood where she lived in 1975.

The school she started was called Westside Preparatory School. Westside Prep became an educational and commercial success. Collins created her low-cost private school specifically for the purpose of teaching low income black children whom Collins felt the Chicago Public School System had mislabeled as being learning disabled. Collins said she had the data to prove that her students were teachable and were able to overcome obstacles of learning via her teaching methods, which she said eliminated behavioral issues and allowed students to flourish.

The one-room schoolhouse of her education influenced her methods. At home her father gave her assignments she believed built her confidence and gave her a sense of responsibility. She felt time spent with students was more valuable than distance-creating audio visual information. Collins and her daughter ran the school for more than 30 years until it closed in 2008 due to lack of sufficient enrollment and funding.

== Media coverage ==
Collins became well-known due to the 1981 TV movie based on her life's work entitled The Marva Collins Story, starring Cicely Tyson and Morgan Freeman. She also appeared on a featured news article on CBS's 60 Minutes. Cicely Tyson, who played Collins in the TV movie, said she spent time with Collins to research for the role. The 60 Minutes feature was inspired by a 1970s article written by Chicago Sun-Times reporter Zay N. Smith about Collins and Westside Prep.

=== Kevin Ross ===
In 1982, Kevin Ross, a 23–year-old Creighton University basketball player, got to his senior year of college without being able to read. With the assistance of a Creighton booster, Ross enrolled in 7th grade at Westside Prep. With private tutoring by Collins, Ross learned how to read and graduated in May 1983. Ross had difficulties continuing his education, but when he had serious troubles, Collins was instrumental in helping him.

== Career highlights ==
Due to the success of her teaching methods, it was reported that President Ronald Reagan wanted to nominate Collins to the position of United States Secretary of Education, but Collins took herself out of the running for the position. In 1983, Reagan cited Collins during an unveiling of a national program to combat adult illiteracy. She was also asked by president George Bush to become Secretary of Education, but she declined in favor of teaching one student at a time. In 1994, Prince featured Collins in his music video for "The Most Beautiful Girl in the World." He also donated $500,000 to the Westside Preparatory School Teacher Training Institute, which was created to teach Collins' educational methodology.

In 1996, Collins was hired to supervise three Chicago public schools that had been placed on probation. In 2004, Collins received a National Humanities Medal, among many awards for her teaching and efforts at school reform. During the 2006–07 school year, Collins' school charged $5,500 for tuition, and parents said the school did a much better job than the Chicago public school system, which budgeted $11,300 per student. The authorities complained that this was not enough.

== Teaching methods and critics ==
Collins was known for applying classical education, in particular the Socratic method, modified for use in primary schools, successfully with impoverished students. Collins criticized the teaching of the students, not the students themselves. She wrote a number of manuals, books and motivational tracts describing her history and methods. In 1982 and in subsequent articles, Collins has been criticized by George N. Schmidt from Substance News, who claims that Collins' work was fraudulent. Collins denied any fraud. At the time, Collins had both supporters and detractors.

== Personal life and death ==
Collins was married to Clarence Collins from September 1960 until his death in 1995. Together, they had three children. Collins died on June 24, 2015, in Beaufort County, South Carolina, aged 78, while in hospice care.

== Works and publications ==
=== Monographs ===
- Collins, Marva, Bert Kruger Smith, and Charlene Warren. A Conversation with Marva Collins: A Different School. From The Human Condition. Austin, Tex: Hogg Foundation for Mental Health, the University of Texas, 1982. OCLC 8257640
- Collins, Marva, and Civia Tamarkin. Marva Collins' Way. New York: Putnam, 1990. Foreword by Alex Haley. 2nd ed. ISBN 978-0-874-77572-3 OCLC 32523785
- Collins, Marva. Ordinary Children, Extraordinary Teachers. Norfolk, VA: Hampton Roads Pub. Co, 1992. ISBN 978-1-878-90141-5 OCLC 26790433
- Collins, Marva. Values: Lighting the Candle of Excellence: A Practical Guide for the Family. Los Angeles, CA: Dove Books, 1996. ISBN 978-0-787-11040-6 OCLC 35896951

=== Video ===
- CBS News. Marva. 60 Minutes. New York: Carousel Films, 1979. OCLC 19834079
- Dave Bell Associates. Success! The Marva Collins Approach. Wilmette, Ill: Television Licensing Center, 1984. OCLC 11311358
- Collins, Marva. Too Good to Be True? 60 Minutes. New York: CBS Video, 1995. OCLC 33502110 - follow up to original 60 Minutes segment.
- Robbins, Anthony, Marva Collins, and Peter Lynch. Anthony Robbins' Powertalk! The Power of Life Metaphors. San Diego, CA: Anthony Robbins, 2004. OCLC 65197212
- Holzgang, Conrad, Clifford Campion, Peter Levin, Cicely Tyson, and Morgan Freeman. The Marva Collins Story. Burbank, CA: Warner Home Video, 2008. ISBN 978-1-419-85861-1 OCLC 185036842

== Awards ==
- 1981: Jefferson Awards for Public Service - Award for Greatest Public Service Benefiting the Disadvantaged
- 1981: George Collins Award of the Congressional Black Caucus
- 2004: National Endowment for the Humanities - National Humanities Medalist
- Alpha Kappa Alpha - Honorary member of the Alpha Kappa Alpha sorority
