= Sweet Justice =

1994 American legal drama TV series

- Genre: Legal drama
- Created by: John Romano
- Starring: Cicely Tyson; Melissa Gilbert; Ronny Cox; Jason Gedrick; Greg Germann
- Composer: W. G. Snuffy Walden
- Country of origin: United States
- Original language: English
- No. of seasons: 1
- No. of episodes: 22

Production
- Executive producer: John Romano
- Running time: 60 minutes
- Production companies: Trotwood Productions; Columbia Pictures Television

Original release
- Network: NBC
- Release: September 15, 1994 – August 12, 1995

Sweet Justice is an American legal drama television series created by John Romano and starring Cicely Tyson and Melissa Gilbert. The hour-long series ran from September 15, 1994, to August 12, 1995, on NBC. The series was produced by Trotwood Productions in association with Columbia Pictures Television.

== Cast and characters ==
- Melissa Gilbert as Kate Delacroy
- Greg Germann as Andy Del Sarto
- Cicely Tyson as Carrie Grace Battle
- Ronny Cox as James Lee Delacroy
- Jason Gedrick as Bailey Connors
- Cree Summer as Reese Daulkins
- Jim Antonio as Ross A. Ross
- Megan Gallivan as Anne Delacroy-Foley
- Scott Paetty as Harry Foley
- Marcia Strassman as Althea "Bunny" McClure
- John Allen Nelson as Logan Wright
- Michael Warren as Michael "T-Dog" Turner

== Episodes ==
No.	Title	Directed by	Written by	Original release date
1	"Pilot"	Michael Dinner	John Romano and Mark Waxman	September 15, 1994
2	"It's a Grand Old Dame"	Unknown	John Romano and Mark Waxman	September 17, 1994
3	"One Good Woman"	Unknown	John Romano and Mark Waxman	September 24, 1994
4	"High School Confidential"	Unknown	John Romano and Mark Waxman	October 1, 1994
5	"The Right Things"	Unknown	John Romano and Mark Waxman	October 8, 1994
6	"Fourth Quarter"	Unknown	John Romano and Mark Waxman	October 15, 1994
7	"Sex, Lies and Shining Armor"	Unknown	John Romano and Mark Waxman	October 22, 1994
8 9	"The Power of Darkness, Pts. 1 & 2"	Unknown	John Romano and Mark Waxman	November 12, 1994
10	"In the Name of the Son"	Unknown	John Romano and Mark Waxman	December 3, 1994
11	"Baby Mine"	Unknown	John Romano and Mark Waxman	January 7, 1995
12	"Both Sides Now"	Unknown	John Romano and Mark Waxman	January 14, 1995
13	"Greener Grass"	Unknown	John Romano, Jean Gennis and Phyllis Murphy	January 21, 1995
14	"Story of My Life"	Unknown	John Romano and Mark Waxman	February 4, 1995
15	"Bloodlines"	Unknown	John Romano and Mark Waxman	March 4, 1995
16	"Clouds of Glory"	Mel Damski	John Romano and Mark Waxman	March 17, 1995
17	"Fire"	Unknown	John Romano and Mark Waxman	March 25, 1995
18	"Just Say Yes"	Unknown	John Romano and Mark Waxman	April 1, 1995
19	"Broken Ties"	Unknown	John Romano and Mark Waxman	April 8, 1995
20	"Pledges"	Unknown	John Romano and Mark Waxman	April 15, 1995
21	"Muddy Waters"	Mel Damski	John Romano and Mark Waxman	April 22, 1995
22	"The Sensational Six"	Unknown	John Romano and Mark Waxman	August 12, 1995
Hinton Battle guest stars.

== Awards and nominations ==
Tyson was nominated for an Emmy Award and a Screen Actors Guild Awards for her role on the series.
