= Cicely Tyson =

American actress (1924–2021)

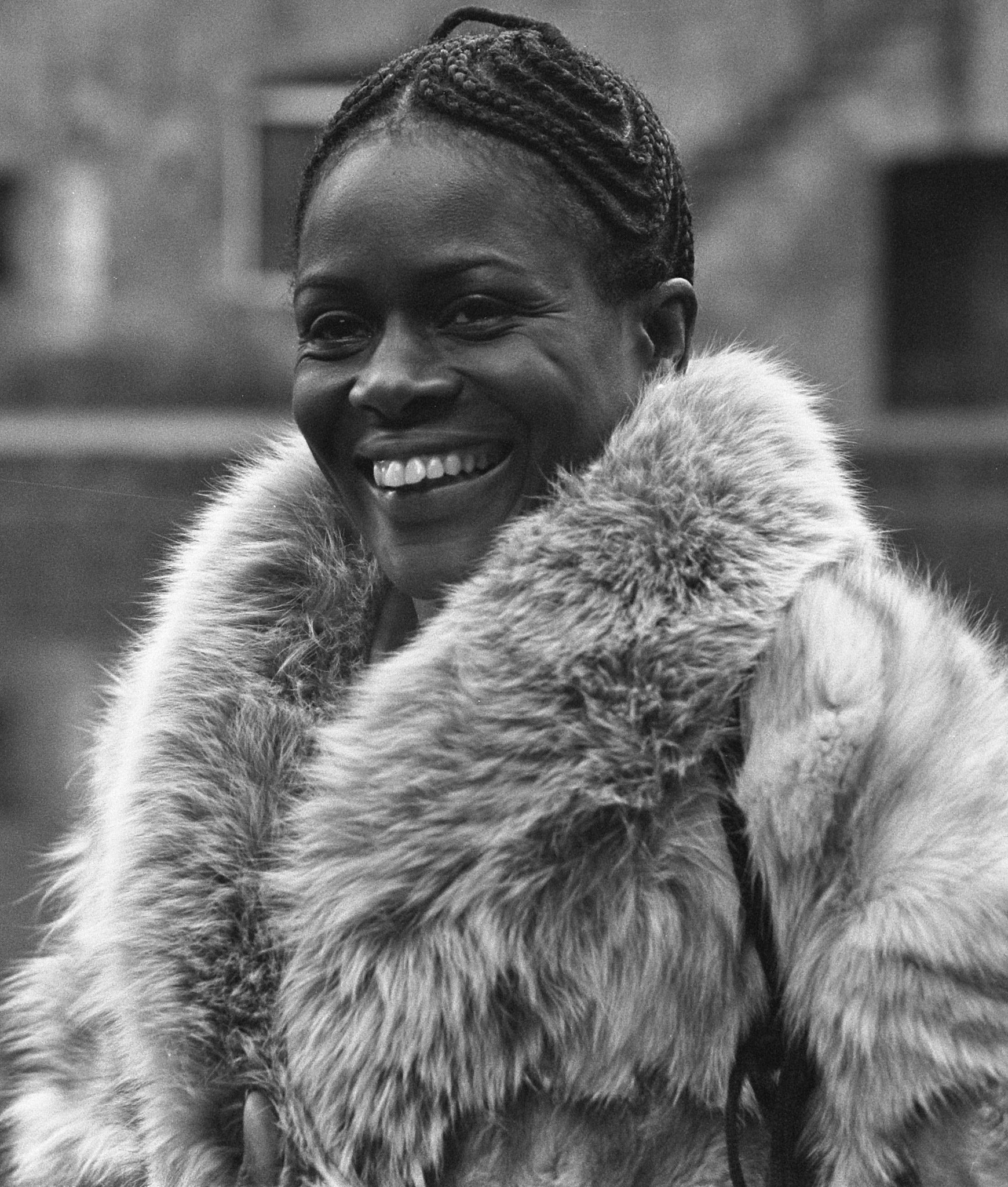
- Tyson in 1973
- Born: Cecily Louise Tyson; December 19, 1924 (Note: At the time of her death, numerous sources, including the New York Times, listed Tyson's date of birth as December 18, 1924. Indeed it was the Times, back in 2013, that had first broken the story, confirmed by Tyson, that the actress was in fact 88 years old, and thus born in December 1924 rather than 1933 as had been previously reported. As Tyson explained in her 2021 memoir, "1933" was no mistake, but rather a prime example of the age-shaving initiated by her onetime manager and perpetuated by Tyson with the express intent of bypassing the pervasive age discrimination facing women in the industry. That said, no matter how many years mysteriously vanished along the way, the month and day of her birth, as cited in media accounts throughout Tyson's career, had remained a constant at December 19. By contrast, the only source for the Times' 12/18 date seems to be a 1935 document, the Petition for Naturalization filed by Cicely's father William Augustine Tyson on July 31 of that year. The problem is that by that time, again as recounted in the 2021 memoir, it had been at least seven months—and perhaps as many as 10—since Mr. Tyson actually resided with his wife and children. The previous fall, no longer willing to put up with William's persistent and unrepentant adultery (not to mention his hair-trigger temper when confronted regarding this behavior), Fredericka Tyson had gathered their three children plus essential belongings and promptly moved to a new address, where her husband was welcome to visit—so as not to deprive their children of a father altogether—but no more than that. (Just how deep a rift had been opened up between the two may perhaps be gleaned from the 1940 U.S. Census entry for the Tyson family, now minus William, wherein all four remaining Tysons have retroactively been 'reborn' in South Carolina.) And so, coming some seven to 10 months after their informal separation, with his attention presumably even more divided than before, a slight lack of precision regarding his eldest daughter's birth date should not come as too great a surprise.); New York City, U.S.
- Died: January 28, 2021 (aged 96); New York City, U.S.
- Resting place: Woodlawn Cemetery
- Occupation: Actress
- Years active: 1948–2020
- Notable work: Full list
- Spouses: Kenneth Franklin (m. 1942; div. 1956) Miles Davis (m. 1981; div. 1989)
- Children: 1
- Awards: Full list

Cecily Louise "Cicely" Tyson (/ˈsɪsəliː/; December 19, 1924 – January 28, 2021) was an American actress. In a career spanning seven decades, she portrayed complex and strong-willed African American women. She received several awards including three Emmy Awards, a Peabody Award and a Tony Award, as well as nominations for a BAFTA Award and a Golden Globe Award. She was awarded the Kennedy Center Honors in 2015, the Presidential Medal of Freedom in 2016, and the Honorary Academy Award in 2018.

Tyson garnered widespread attention and critical acclaim for her performance as a Black mother facing adversity in the dramatic film Sounder (1972), for which she was nominated for both the Academy Award for Best Actress and Golden Globe Award for Best Actress in a Motion Picture – Drama. She also acted in films such as A Man Called Adam (1966), The Heart Is a Lonely Hunter (1968), The River Niger (1976), Fried Green Tomatoes (1991), Diary of a Mad Black Woman (2005), Because of Winn-Dixie (2005), The Help (2011) and Last Flag Flying (2017).

On television, she broke barriers by taking a regular role on the CBS drama series East Side West Side (1963–1964). She won two Primetime Emmy Awards, her first for Best Lead Actress in a Drama for The Autobiography of Miss Jane Pittman (1974), and her second for Outstanding Supporting Actress in a Miniseries or Movie for Oldest Living Confederate Widow Tells All (1994). She was Emmy-nominated for her roles in Roots (1977), King (1978), Sweet Justice (1995), A Lesson Before Dying (1999), The Trip to Bountiful (2013) and How to Get Away With Murder (2015–2020).

In addition to her screen career, Tyson starred on Broadway. She made her debut in the Lonnie Coleman play Jolly's Progress (1959), followed by Tiger, Tiger Burning Bright (1962), Carry Me Back to Morningside Heights (1968) and The Corn Is Green (1983). At age 88, she became the oldest winner for the Tony Award for Best Actress in a Play for her role in the revival of the Horton Foote play The Trip to Bountiful (2013). She made her final Broadway appearance starring in the revival of The Gin Game (2016), opposite James Earl Jones.

== Early life ==
Tyson was born on December 19, 1924, in the Bronx, New York City, but soon relocated with her family to East Harlem. She was one of three children born to Fredericka (Huggins) Tyson, a domestic worker, and William Augustine Tyson, who worked as a carpenter and painter. Her parents were immigrants from Nevis in the West Indies. Her father arrived in New York City at age 21 and was processed at Ellis Island on August 4, 1919.

Tyson grew up in a religious atmosphere. She sang in the choir and attended prayer meetings at an Episcopal church in East Harlem. Tyson's mother was opposed to her becoming an actress and would not speak to her for a time. She changed her mind when she saw Cicely appear on stage.

Tyson would study acting under Lee Strasberg.

== Career ==
=== 1956–1969: Rise to prominence ===
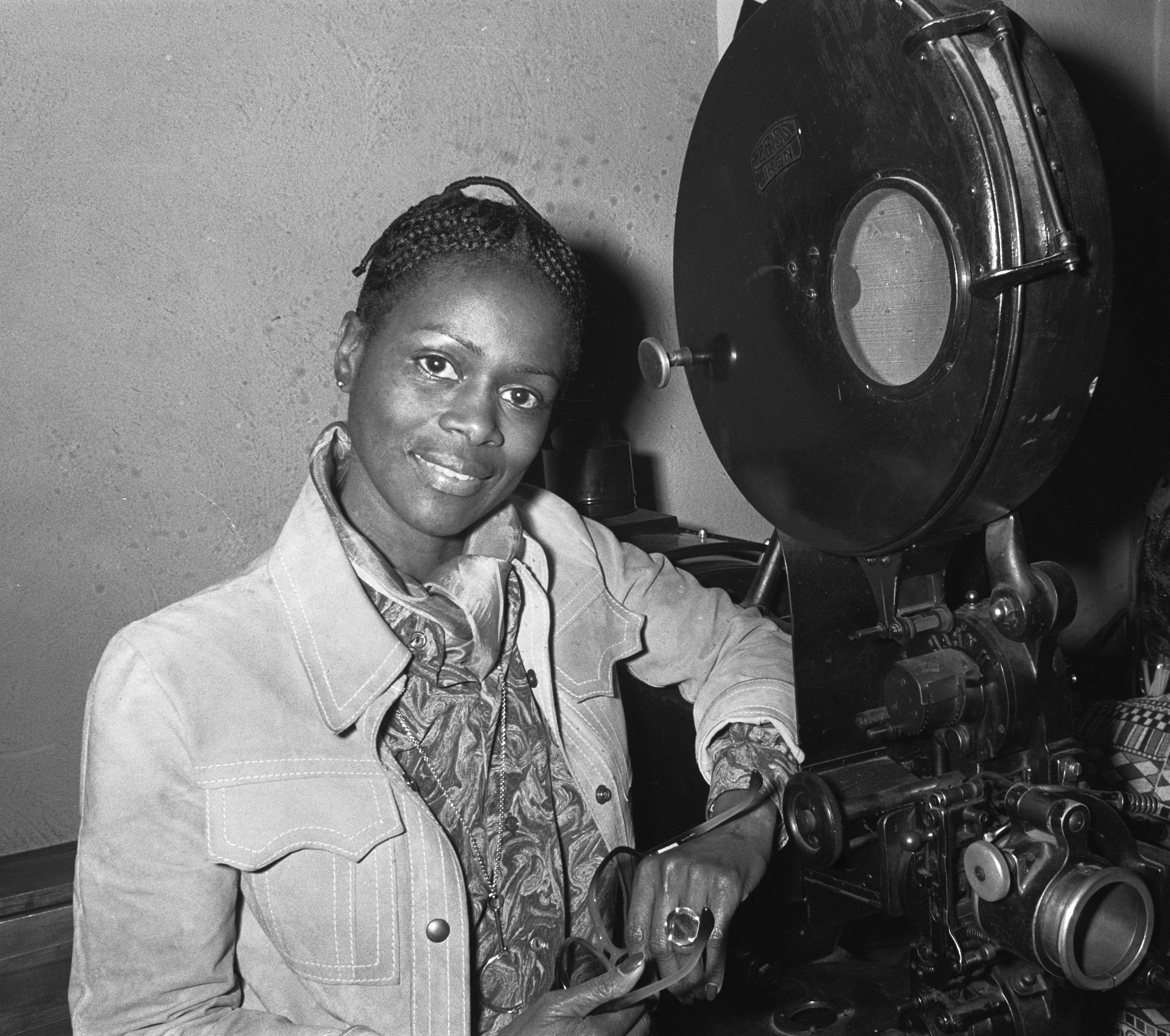
Tyson in 1973

Tyson was discovered by a photographer for Ebony magazine and became a successful fashion model. Her first acting role was a bit part in the 1956 film Carib Gold and she first appeared onstage in Vinnette Carroll's production of Dark of the Moon at the Harlem YMCA in 1958. Tyson had small roles in the 1959 films Odds Against Tomorrow and The Last Angry Man, as well as the 1960 comedy, Who Was That Lady? In 1961, she made her television debut in the NBC series Frontiers of Faith. In 1962, she became the first African American woman to wear an Afro on television in the United States.

In the early 1960s, Tyson appeared in the original cast of French playwright Jean Genet's The Blacks. She played the role of Stephanie Virtue Secret-Rose Diop; other cast members included Maya Angelou, James Earl Jones, Godfrey Cambridge, Louis Gossett Jr., and Charles Gordone. The show was the longest running off-Broadway non-musical of the decade, running for 1,408 performances. She won the 1961–1962 Vernon Rice Award (later known as the Drama Desk Award) for her performance in another off-Broadway production, Moon on a Rainbow Shawl. In 1963, Tyson appeared on the game show To Tell The Truth as an "imposter" for Australian singer Shirley Abicair, receiving two of the four possible votes.

Tyson, who once worked for a social services agency, was spotted by producer David Susskind in The Blacks and in Tiger, Tiger Burning Bright, and was cast for a role in the CBS TV series East Side/West Side (1963–1964), playing the secretary of a social worker played by George C. Scott. She was at the time the only African-American regular member of a TV cast, The show was noted for its treatment of social issues, and one of its episodes, on an African-American couple in Harlem (played by James Earl Jones and Diana Sands), was blacked out in Atlanta and Shreveport, Louisiana. In the mid-1960s she had a recurring role in the soap opera The Guiding Light. She appeared with Sammy Davis Jr. in the film A Man Called Adam (1966) and had a small role in the film version of The Comedians (1967) based on the Graham Greene novel. In 1968 Tyson had a featured role in The Heart Is a Lonely Hunter.

=== 1970–1989: Stardom and acclaim ===
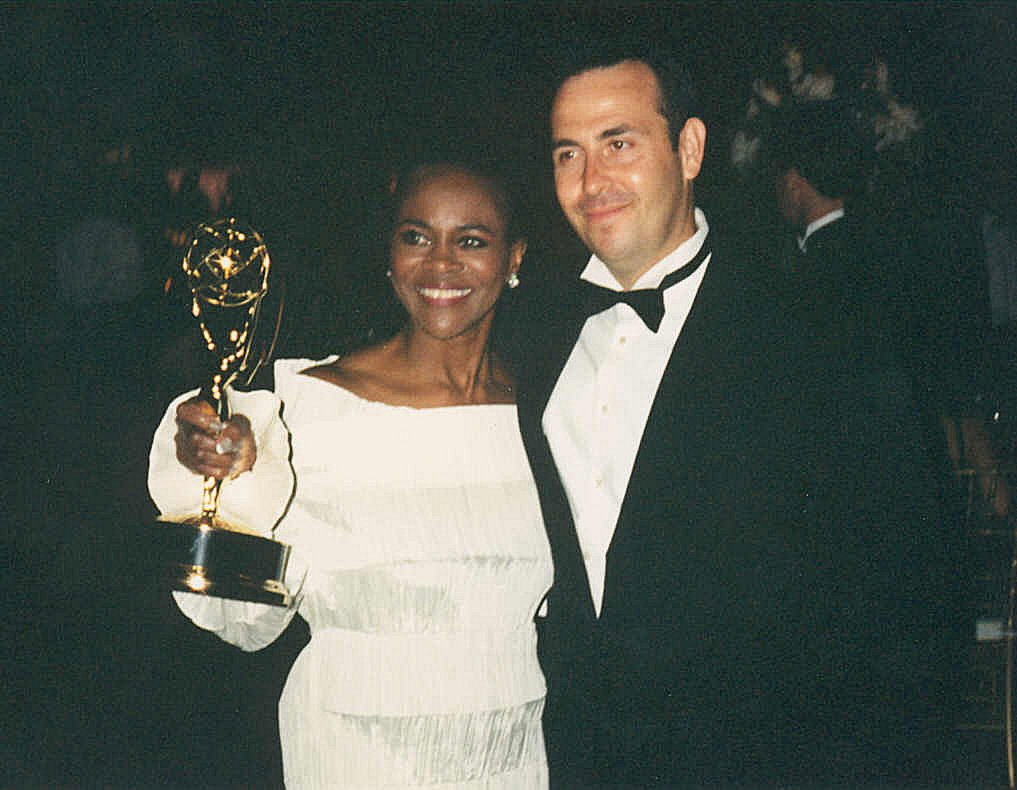
Tyson with her Primetime Emmy Award at the Governor's Ball in 1994

In 1972, Tyson played the role of Rebecca Morgan in the film Sounder. She was nominated for both the Academy Award and Golden Globe Award for Best Actress for her work in Sounder, and also won the NSFC Best Actress and NBR Best Actress Awards. Critic Roger Ebert wrote of her performance, "The mother is played by Cicely Tyson, and it is a wonder to see the subtleties in her performance. We have seen her with her family, and we know her strength and intelligence. Then we see her dealing with the white power structure, and her behavior toward it is in a style born of cynicism and necessity. She will say what they want to hear in order to get what she wants to get."

In 1974, Tyson played the title role in the CBS television film The Autobiography of Miss Jane Pittman. Tyson's portrayal of a centenarian black woman's life from slavery until her death before the Civil rights movement won her Emmy Awards Outstanding Lead Actress – Miniseries or a Movie and Actress of the Year – Special. Tyson was also nominated for a BAFTA Award for Best Actress in a Leading Role for her work in this television film. Nikki Giovanni of The New York Times wrote of her performance, "If Cicely Tyson isn't one of the best actresses on screen, then "grits ain't groceries, eggs ain't poultry, and Mona Lisa was a man," adding, "Miss Tyson never stepped out of character. Miss Tyson's performance was the reason awards were first invented."

Tyson's television roles included: Binta in the 1977 miniseries Roots, for which she was nominated for a Primetime Emmy Award for Outstanding Supporting Actress – Miniseries or a Movie; Coretta Scott King in the 1978 miniseries King, for which she was nominated for a Primetime Emmy Award for Outstanding Lead Actress – Miniseries or a Movie; Marva Collins in the 1981 television film The Marva Collins Story, for which she received an NAACP Image Award for Outstanding Actress in a Television Movie, Mini-Series or Dramatic Special and was nominated for a Primetime Emmy Award for Outstanding Lead Actress – Miniseries or a Movie; and Muriel in the 1986 television film Samaritan: The Mitch Snyder Story, for which she received an NAACP Image Award for Outstanding Actress in a Television Movie, Mini-Series or Dramatic Special. Tyson was the first black woman to host Saturday Night Live. Her episode featured the musical guest Talking Heads and aired on February 10, 1979. In 1989, Tyson appeared in the television miniseries The Women of Brewster Place.

=== 1990–2021: Established star ===
In 1991, Tyson appeared in Fried Green Tomatoes as Sipsey. In the 1994–95 television series Sweet Justice, Tyson portrayed a civil rights activist and attorney named Carrie Grace Battle, a character she modeled after Dovey Johnson Roundtree. Her other film roles include the dramas Hoodlum (1997) and Diary of a Mad Black Woman (2005), and the television films Oldest Living Confederate Widow Tells All (1994) (for which she received her third Emmy Award) and A Lesson Before Dying (1999). In 2005, Tyson co-starred in Because of Winn-Dixie.

In 2010, Tyson appeared in Why Did I Get Married Too? and narrated the Paul Robeson Award-winning documentary Up from the Bottoms: The Search for the American Dream. In 2011, Tyson appeared in her first music video in Willow Smith's 21st Century Girl. That same year, she played Constantine Jefferson, a maid in Jackson, Mississippi, in the critically acclaimed period drama The Help. Set in the backdrop of the Civil Rights Movement, the film won the Broadcast Film Critics Association Award for Best Acting Ensemble and the Screen Actors Guild Award for Outstanding Performance by a Cast in a Motion Picture.

At the 67th Tony Awards, on June 9, 2013, Tyson won the Tony Award for Best Actress in a Play for her performance as Miss Carrie Watts in the Broadway revival of the Horton Foote play The Trip to Bountiful. Upon winning, the 88-year-old actress became the oldest recipient of the Best Actress Tony Award. She also won the Drama Desk Award for Outstanding Actress in a Play and the Outer Critics Circle Award for Outstanding Actress in a Play for the role.

In 2013, Tyson played a supporting role in the horror film The Haunting in Connecticut 2: Ghosts of Georgia. Beginning in 2014, Tyson guest-starred on How to Get Away with Murder as Ophelia Harkness, the mother of main character Annalise Keating (Viola Davis); for this role, she was nominated for a Primetime Emmy Award for Outstanding Guest Actress in a Drama Series in 2015, 2017, 2018, 2019, and 2020. In 2020, she starred in the popular movie A Fall From Grace which was featured on Netflix.

== Personal life ==
=== Marriages and relationships ===
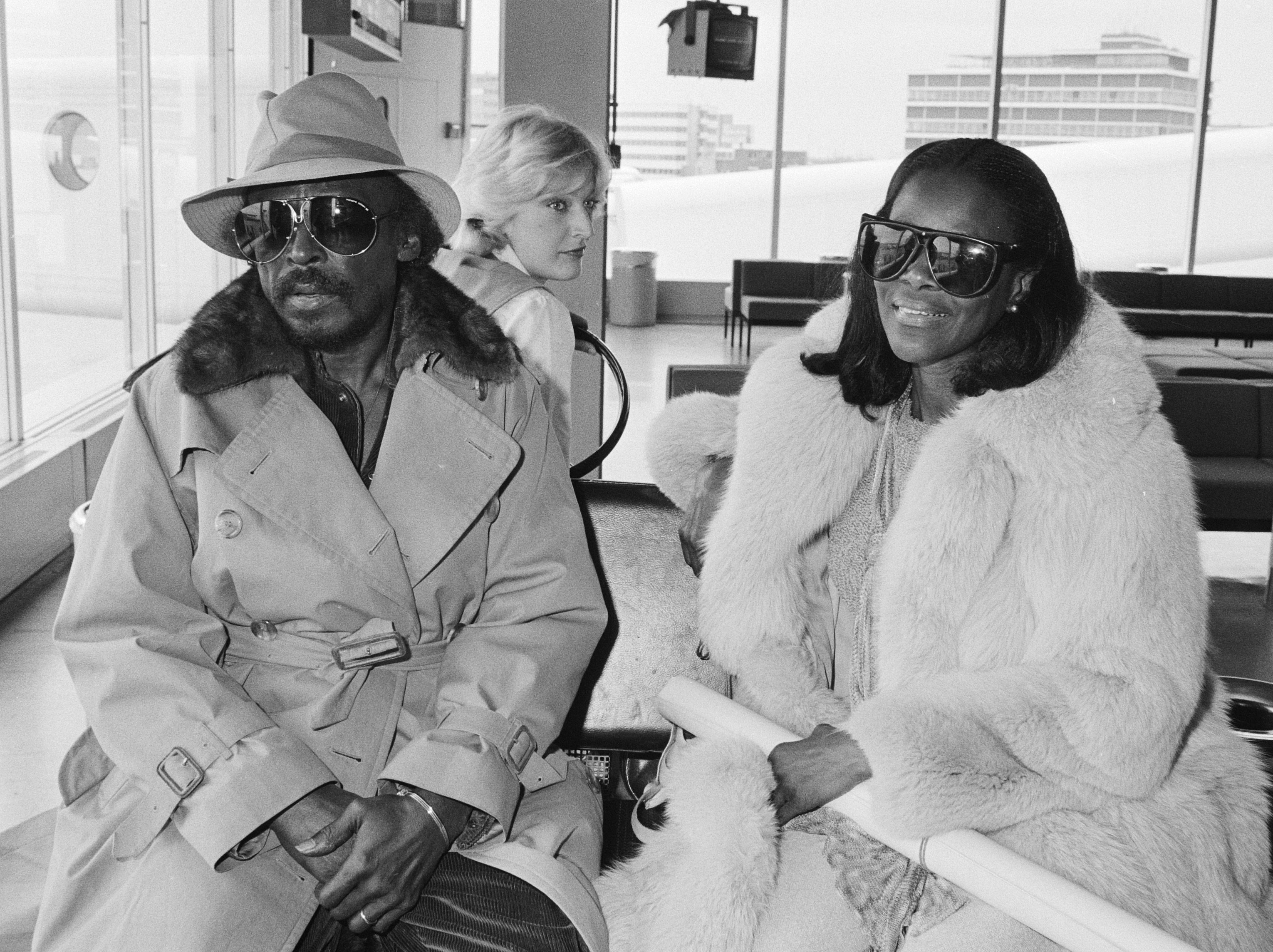
Davis and Tyson in 1982

At the age of 18, Tyson married Kenneth Franklin on December 27, 1942. They had a daughter two months later, in February 1943. According to her divorce decree, her husband abandoned her on June 18, 1944. The marriage was formally dissolved in 1956.

She was in a relationship with her Sounder co-star Paul Winfield, living with him for about 18 months in the early 1970s.

Tyson began dating jazz trumpeter Miles Davis in the 1960s when he was in the process of divorcing dancer Frances Davis. Davis used a photo of Tyson for his 1967 album, Sorcerer. Davis told the press in 1967 that he intended to marry Tyson in March 1968 after his divorce was finalized, but instead he married singer Betty Mabry that September.

Tyson and Davis rekindled their relationship in 1978. They were married on November 26, 1981, in a ceremony conducted by Atlanta mayor Andrew Young at the home of actor Bill Cosby. Their marriage was tumultuous due to Davis' volatile temper and infidelity. Davis credited Tyson with saving his life and helping him overcome his cocaine addiction. They resided in Malibu, California, and New York City, until she filed for divorce in 1988. Their divorce was finalized in 1989, two years before Davis died in 1991.

Tyson was godmother to the singer Lenny Kravitz, having been friends with his mother, actress Roxie Roker, as well as to Denzel Washington's daughter Katia and Tyler Perry's son Aman.

=== Interests and memoir ===
Tyson was an honorary member of Delta Sigma Theta sorority. She was a member of the Abyssinian Baptist Church of New York. She was a vegetarian. She was also a first cousin of Louis Farrakhan, a longtime leader of the Nation of Islam. Tyson's memoir, Just as I Am, was published on January 26, 2021, and she promoted the book during the last weeks of her life. When she was asked how she wanted to be remembered in an interview with Gayle King, Tyson said, "I've done my best. That's all."

=== Death and tributes ===
Tyson died on January 28, 2021, in New York City, at age 96. Her funeral was held on February 16 at the Abyssinian Baptist Church in Harlem, and was attended by Tyler Perry, her godson Lenny Kravitz, and Bill and Hillary Clinton. Tyson was interred in Woodlawn Cemetery (Bronx, New York) with former husband Miles Davis.

After her death, former President Barack Obama released a statement, reading in part, "Michelle and I were honored when Cicely came to The White House to accept the Medal of Freedom, knowing she was one of the many giants upon whose shoulders we stood — a trailblazer whose legacy couldn't be measured by her Emmys and Tony and Oscar alone, but by the barriers she broke and the dreams she made possible." Vice President Kamala Harris praised her for "inspir[ing] the world with her art, activism, and altruism".

Martin Luther King Jr.'s daughter Bernice King described her writing, "An elder...now an ancestor. What a vessel". Tyson's How To Get Away with Murder co-star Viola Davis wrote that she "made me feel loved and seen and valued" and gave her "permission to dream". Numerous members of the entertainment industry also paid tribute, including Ava DuVernay, Barry Jenkins, Regina King, Halle Berry, Kerry Washington, Tessa Thompson, Zendaya, Zoë Kravitz, Rihanna, Tracee Ellis Ross, LeVar Burton, Tyler Perry, Oprah Winfrey, Shonda Rhimes and Rita Moreno.

== Acting credits and accolades ==
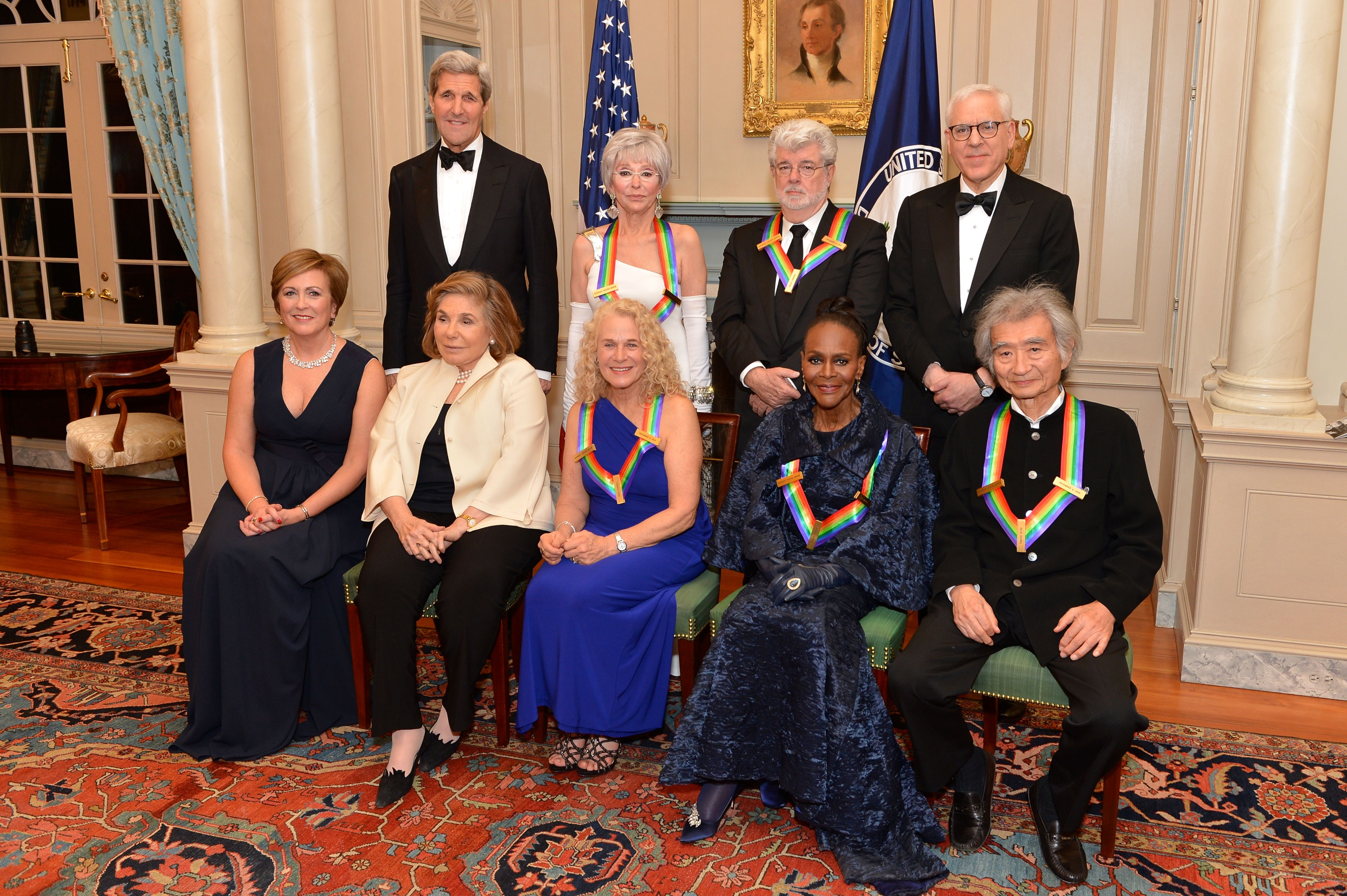
Secretary of State John Kerry with Kennedy Center Honorees Rita Moreno, Carole King, George Lucas, Cicely Tyson, and Seiji Ozawa in 2015

During her prolific career she acted in film and television projects such as The Heart Is a Lonely Hunter (1968), Sounder (1972), The Autobiography of Miss Jane Pittman (1974), Roots (1977), A Woman Called Moses (1978), Bustin' Loose (1981), Fried Green Tomatoes (1991), A Lesson Before Dying (1999), Because of Winn-Dixie (2005), Diary of a Mad Black Woman (2005), Idlewild (2006), The Help (2011), The Trip to Bountiful (2014), How to Get Away with Murder (2015–2020), House of Cards (2016), Last Flag Flying (2017), and A Fall From Grace (2020)

Cicely Tyson is the recipient of numerous accolades, including an Academy Honorary Award, three Primetime Emmy Awards, and a Tony Award. Tyson won three Primetime Emmy Awards for her work in television winning for, The Autobiography of Miss Jane Pittman (1974), and Oldest Living Confederate Widow Tells All (1994). She won the Tony Award for Best Actress in a Play her performance in The Trip to Bountiful in 2014. Tyson won her Honorary Academy Award in 2018 with the inscription reading, "Whose unforgettable performances and personal integrity have inspired generations of filmmakers, actors and audiences." Tyson has also received various honours for her lifetime achievement as a groundbreaking artist. In 2015, she received a Kennedy Center Honor. In 2016 she was bestowed the Presidential Medal of Freedom from President Barack Obama. In 2020, she received a Career Achievement Peabody Award. That same year she was inducted into the Television Hall of Fame.

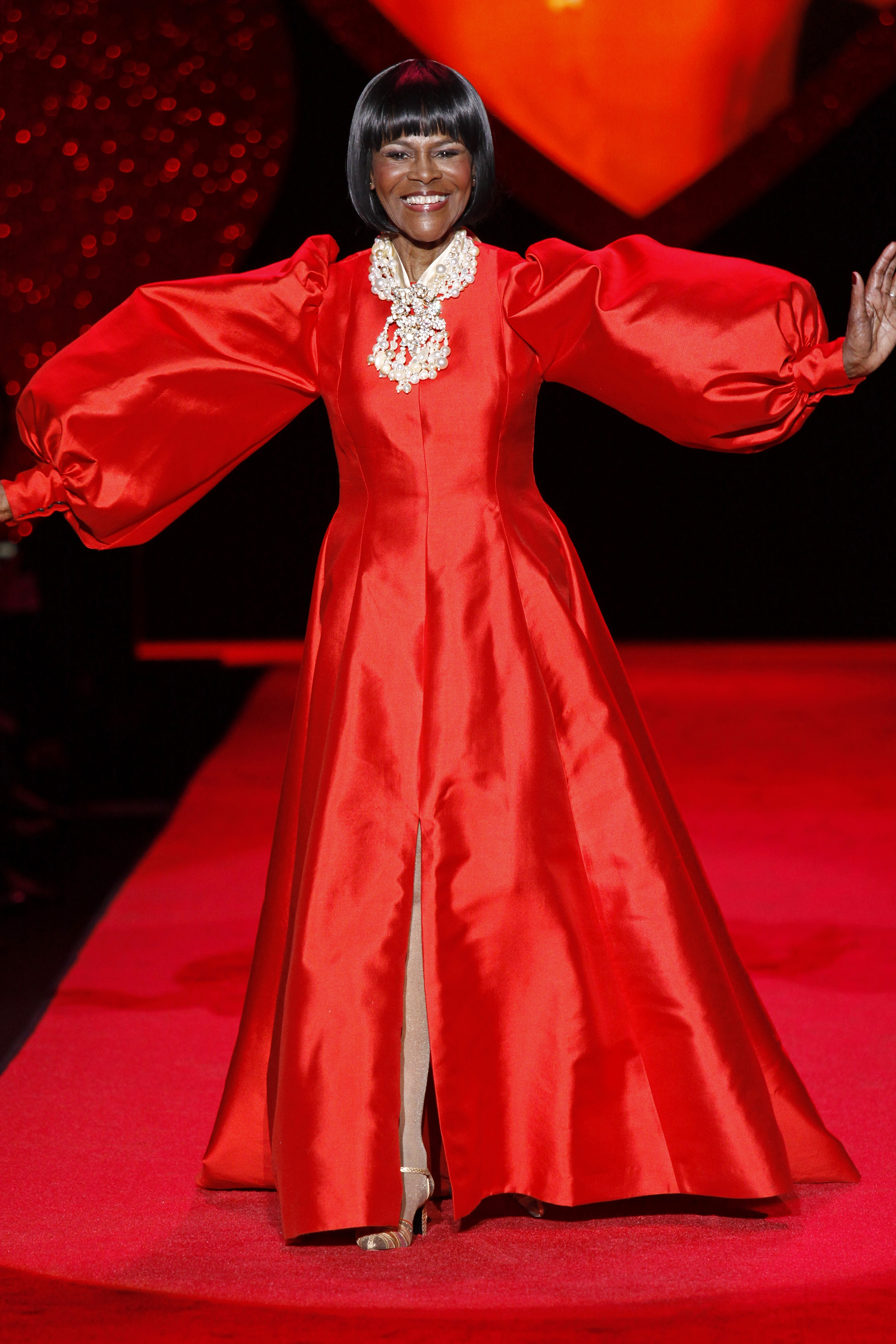
Tyson in 2009

In 1977, Tyson was inducted into the Black Filmmakers Hall of Fame. In 1980, she received the Golden Plate Award of the American Academy of Achievement. In 1982, Tyson was awarded the Women in Film Crystal Award. The award is given to outstanding women who, through their endurance and the excellence of their work, have helped to expand the role of women within the entertainment industry. In 1988, Tyson received a Candace Award for Distinguished Service from the National Coalition of 100 Black Women. In 1997, she received a star on the Hollywood Walk of Fame.

In 2005, Tyson was honored at Oprah Winfrey's Legends Ball. She was also honored by the Congress of Racial Equality, the National Association for the Advancement of Colored People, and the National Council of Negro Women. Tyson was awarded the NAACP's 2010 Spingarn Medal for her contribution to the entertainment industry, her modeling career, and her support of civil rights. Tyson was a recipient of the Kennedy Center Honors in 2015. She was awarded the United States' highest civilian honor, the Presidential Medal of Freedom, by President Barack Obama in November 2016. In September 2018, the Academy of Motion Picture Arts and Sciences announced that Tyson would receive an Academy Honorary Award. On November 18, 2018, Tyson became the first African-American woman to receive an honorary Oscar. In 2018, Tyson was inducted into the American Theater Hall of Fame. One of 12 soundstages was named after Tyson in her honor at Tyler Perry Studios. She was chosen to be inducted into the Television Academy's Hall of Fame in 2020. In 2022, she was posthumously inducted into the Black Music & Entertainment Walk of Fame in 2022.

Tyson received honorary degrees from Clark Atlanta University, Columbia University; Howard University; and Morehouse College, an all-male historically black college. The Cicely Tyson School of Performing and Fine Arts, a magnet school in East Orange, New Jersey, was named after her in 2009.
