= The Autobiography of Miss Jane Pittman (film) =

- DVD cover
- Genre: Drama
- Based on: The Autobiography of Miss Jane Pittman by Ernest J. Gaines
- Screenplay by: Tracy Keenan Wynn
- Directed by: John Korty
- Starring: Cicely Tyson; Barbara Cheney; Richard Dysart; Katherine Helmond; Michael Murphy; Odetta; Thalmus Rasulala
- Music by: Fred Karlin
- Country of origin: United States
- Original language: English

Production
- Producers: Robert W. Christiansen; Rick Rosenberg; Philip Barry Jr.
- Production locations: Natchez, Mississippi; Woodville, Mississippi; Ashland-Belle Helene Plantation - State Highway 75, Geismer, Louisiana; Ryan Airport - 9430 Jackie Cochran Drive, Baton Rouge, Louisiana; The Cottage Plantation - 10528 Cottage Lane, St. Francisville, Louisiana
- Cinematography: James Crabe
- Editor: Sidney Levin
- Running time: 110 minutes
- Production company: Tomorrow Entertainment

Original release
- Network: CBS
- Release: January 31, 1974

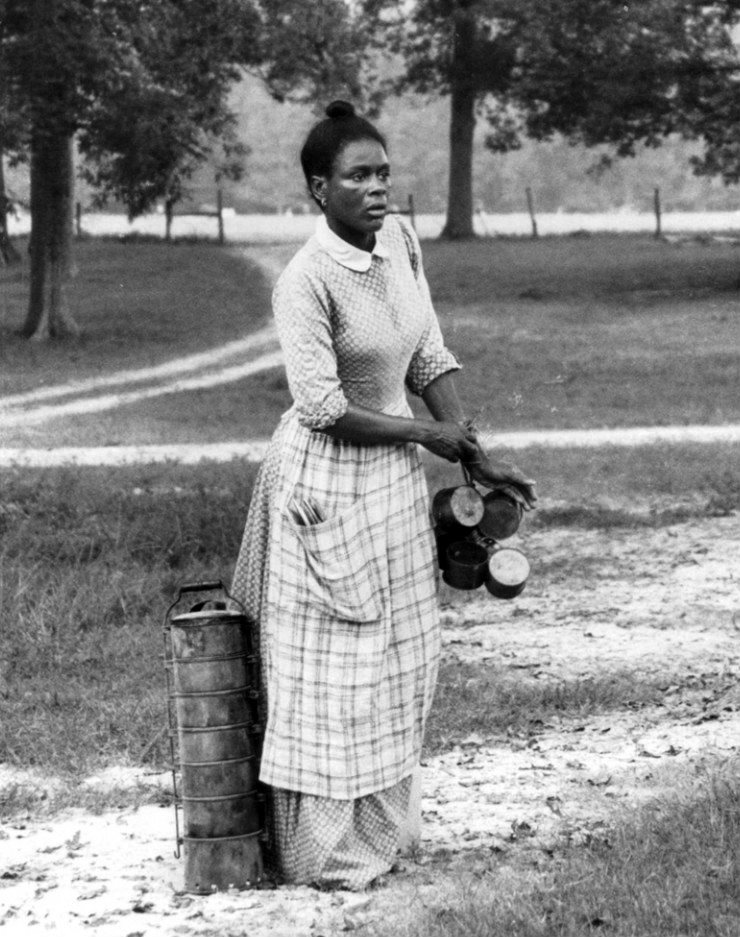
Cicely Tyson as Jane Pittman (1974)

The Autobiography of Miss Jane Pittman is an American television film based on the novel of the same name by Ernest J. Gaines starring Cicely Tyson as the titular heroine. The film was broadcast on CBS on Thursday, January 31, 1974.

Directed by John Korty, the screenplay was written by Tracy Keenan Wynn and executive produced by Roger Gimbel. It stars Cicely Tyson in the lead role, as well as Michael Murphy, Richard Dysart, Katherine Helmond, and Odetta. The film was shot in Baton Rouge, Louisiana, and was notable for its use of very realistic special effects makeup by Stan Winston and Rick Baker for the lead character, who is shown from ages 23 to 110. The film is distributed through Classic Media.

== Synopsis ==
February 1962 Civil Rights Movement. Jane (played by Cicely Tyson), a former slave, is celebrating her 110th birthday. Two men tell her that a little girl is going to a segregated water fountain; she gets arrested because she is black. The next day Jane is interviewed by a journalist named Quentin Lerner (played by Michael Murphy) and she tells the story of her life. The climax of the story shows Jane going to the water fountain to desegregate it; her lifespan has bridged the time of slavery and the Civil Rights Movement.

== Cast ==
- Cicely Tyson as Jane Pittman
- Richard Dysart as Master Bryant
- Odetta as Big Laura
- Michael Murphy as Quentin Lerner
- Rod Perry as Joe Pittman
- Arnold Wilkerson as Jimmy
- Will Hare as Albert Cluveau
- Katherine Helmond as Lady at House
- Thalmus Rasulala as Ned Douglas
- Barbara Chaney as Amma Dean
- Valerie Odell as Ticey (young Jane Pittman)
- Beatrice Winde as Lena

== Awards ==
- Directors Guild of America Award
- Nine Emmy Awards
  - Actress of the Year (Cicely Tyson)
  - Best Directing in Drama - A Single Program - Comedy or Drama
  - Best Lead Actress in a Drama (Cicely Tyson)
  - Best Music Composition - for a Special Program (Fred Karlin)
  - Best Writing in Drama - Adaptation (Tracy Keenan Wynn)
  - Outstanding Achievement in Costume Design (Bruce Walkup and Sandra Stewart)
  - Outstanding Achievement in Makeup (Stan Winston and Rick Baker)
  - Outstanding Special - Comedy or Drama (Robert Christiansen and Rick Rosenberg)
  - Outstanding Achievement in Any Area of Creative Technical Crafts (Lynda Gurasich, hairstylist)
- Nominated for a BAFTA award
  - Best Actress (Cicely Tyson)

== See also ==
- Mama Flora's Family, 1998 historical fiction film in which Tyson also leads the cast
