= List of awards and nominations received by Don Cheadle =

Don Cheadle awards and nominations
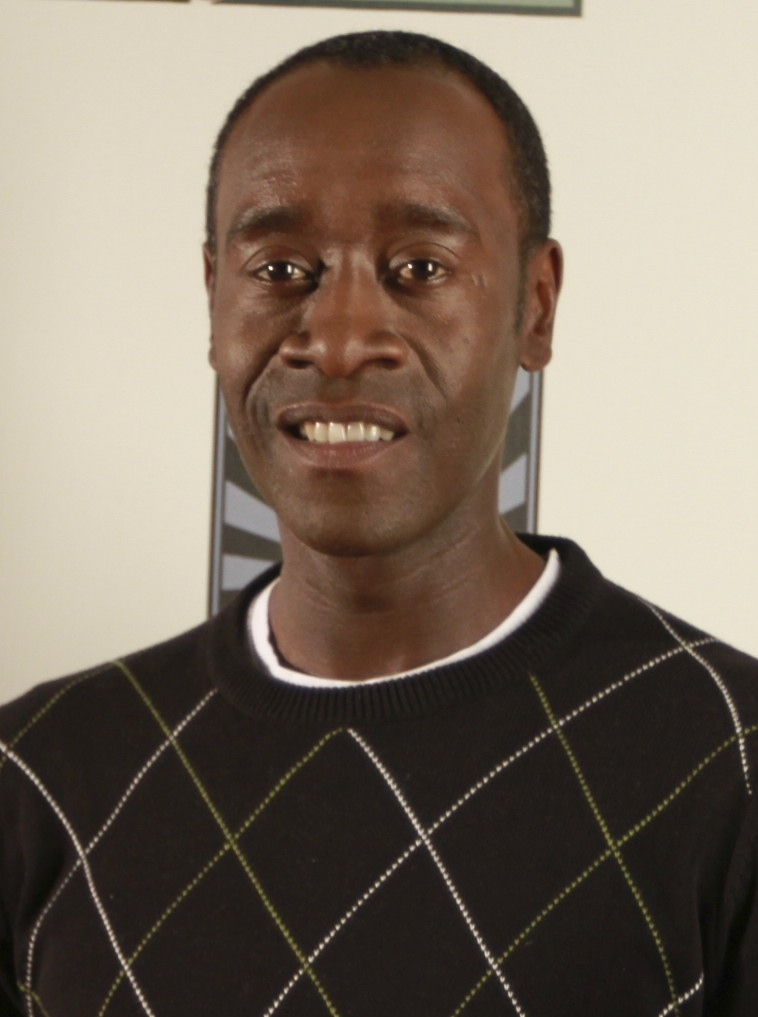
- Cheadle at the UNEP Programme in 2011
Awards and nominations
Award	Wins	Nominations
Academy Awards	0	1
Emmy Awards	0	11
Golden Globe Awards	2	6
Grammy Awards	2	3
Screen Actors Guild Awards	2	10
Tony Award	1	1

Totals (Note: Certain award groups do not simply award one winner. They acknowledge several different recipients, have runners-up, and have third place. Since this is a specific recognition and is different from losing an award, runner-up mentions are considered wins in this award tally. For simplification and to avoid errors, each award in this list has been presumed to have had a prior nomination.)
- Wins: 41
- Nominations: 98

Don Cheadle is an American actor who has received multiple accolades for his film, television and stage performances. Over his career he has received two Golden Globe Awards, two Grammy Awards, two Screen Actors Guild Awards and a Tony Award as well as nominations for an Academy Award and eleven Primetime Emmy Awards.

Cheadle was nominated for the Academy Award for Best Actor for his portrayal of Paul Rusesabagina in the docudrama Hotel Rwanda (2004). He was also nominated for the BAFTA Award for Best Actor in a Supporting Role for his role in Crash (2005), and the Golden Globe Award for Best Actor in a Motion Picture – Drama for Hotel Rwanda (2004).

== Major associations ==
=== Academy Awards ===
Year	Category	Nominated work	Result	Ref.
2005	Best Actor	Hotel Rwanda	Nominated	

=== BAFTA Awards ===
Year	Category	Nominated work	Result	Ref.
British Academy Film Awards
2006	Best Film	Crash	Nominated	
2006	Best Actor in a Supporting Role	Crash	Nominated	
British Academy Britannia Awards
2008	BAFTA/LA Humanitarian Award	Himself	Honored	

=== Emmy Awards ===
Year	Category	Nominated work	Result	Ref.
Primetime Emmy Awards
1999	Outstanding Supporting Actor in a Miniseries or a Movie	The Rat Pack	Nominated	
1999	Outstanding Lead Actor in a Miniseries or a Movie	A Lesson Before Dying	Nominated	
2002	Outstanding Supporting Actor in a Miniseries or a Movie	Things Behind the Sun	Nominated	
2003	Outstanding Guest Actor in a Drama Series	ER	Nominated	
2012	Outstanding Lead Actor in a Comedy Series	House of Lies	Nominated	
2013	Outstanding Lead Actor in a Comedy Series	House of Lies	Nominated	
2014	Outstanding Lead Actor in a Comedy Series	House of Lies	Nominated	
2015	Outstanding Lead Actor in a Comedy Series	House of Lies	Nominated	
2019	Outstanding Lead Actor in a Comedy Series	Black Monday	Nominated	
2020	Outstanding Lead Actor in a Comedy Series	Black Monday	Nominated	
2021	Outstanding Guest Actor in a Drama Series	The Falcon and the Winter Soldier	Nominated	

=== Golden Globe Awards ===
Year	Category	Nominated work	Result	Ref.
1999	Best Supporting Actor - Television	The Rat Pack	Won	
2005	Best Actor – Motion Picture Drama	Hotel Rwanda	Nominated	
2013	Best Actor – Television Series Musical or Comedy	House of Lies	Won	
2014	Best Actor – Television Series Musical or Comedy	House of Lies	Nominated	
2015	Best Actor – Television Series Musical or Comedy	House of Lies	Nominated	
2021	Best Actor – Television Series Musical or Comedy	Black Monday	Nominated	

=== Grammy Awards ===
Year	Category	Nominated work	Result	Ref.
2003	Best Spoken Word Album	Fear Itself (Walter Mosley)	Nominated	
2016	Best Compilation Soundtrack for Visual Media	Miles Ahead	Won	
2022	Best Spoken Word Album	Carry On: Reflections for a New Generation from John Lewis	Won	

=== Independent Spirit Award ===
Year	Category	Nominated work	Result	Ref.
2002	Best Supporting Male	Things Behind the Sun	Nominated	
2006	Best First Feature	Crash	Won	
2008	Best Male Lead	Talk to Me	Nominated	

=== Screen Actors Guild Awards ===
Year	Category	Nominated work	Result	Ref.
1995	Outstanding Ensemble in a Drama Series	Picket Fences	Nominated	
1996	Outstanding Ensemble in a Drama Series	Picket Fences	Nominated	
1996	Outstanding Male Actor in a Supporting Role	Devil in a Blue Dress	Nominated	
1998	Outstanding Cast in a Motion Picture	Boogie Nights	Nominated	
2001	Outstanding Cast in a Motion Picture	Traffic	Won	
2005	Outstanding Male Actor in a Leading Role	Hotel Rwanda	Nominated	
2005	Outstanding Cast in a Motion Picture	Hotel Rwanda	Nominated	
2006	Outstanding Male Actor in a Supporting Role	Crash	Nominated	
2006	Outstanding Cast in a Motion Picture	Crash	Won	
2014	Outstanding Male Actor in a Comedy Series	House of Lies	Nominated	

=== Tony Awards ===
Year	Category	Nominated work	Result	Ref.
2022	Best Musical	A Strange Loop	Won	

== Miscellaneous awards ==
Organizations	Year	Category	Work	Result	Ref.
AARP Movies for Grownups Awards	2017	Breakthrough Achievement	Miles Ahead	Nominated	
Audie Awards	2010	Audiobook of the Year	Nelson Mandela's Favorite African Folktales	Won	
Audie Awards	2010	Multi-Voiced Performance	Nelson Mandela's Favorite African Folktales	Won	
Audie Awards	2022	Business and Personal Development	Carry On: Reflections for a New Generation from John Lewis	Nominated	
Awards Circuit Community Awards	2004	Best Actor in a Leading Role	Hotel Rwanda	Nominated	
Awards Circuit Community Awards	2005	Best Motion Picture	Crash	Nominated	
Awards Circuit Community Awards	2005	Best Cast Ensemble	Crash	Won	
BET Awards	2005	Best Actor	Hotel Rwanda	Nominated	
BET Awards	2005	Best Actor	Ocean's Twelve	Nominated	
BET Awards	2005	Best Actor	After the Sunset	Nominated	
BET Awards	2006	Best Actor	Crash	Nominated	
BET Awards	2007	Humanitarian Award	Himself	Won	
BET Awards	2008	Best Actor	Talk to Me	Nominated	
BET Awards	2008	Best Actor	Ocean's Thirteen	Nominated	
BET Awards	2010	Best Actor	Brooklyn's Finest	Nominated	
BET Awards	2011	Best Actor	Iron Man 2	Nominated	
BET Awards	2012	Best Actor	The Guard	Nominated	
BET Awards	2012	Best Actor	House of Lies	Nominated	
BET Awards	2013	Best Actor	Flight	Nominated	
Black Reel Awards	2000	Best Actor: T.V. Movie/Cable	A Lesson Before Dying	Won	
Black Reel Awards	2001	Best Supporting Actor	Traffic	Won	
Black Reel Awards	2005	Best Actor	Hotel Rwanda	Nominated	
Black Reel Awards	2006	Best Actor	Crash	Nominated	
Black Reel Awards	2006	Best Film	Crash	Won	
Black Reel Awards	2008	Best Film	Traitor	Nominated	
Black Reel Awards	2008	Best Actor	Traitor	Nominated	
Black Reel Awards	2011	Best Actor	Brooklyn's Finest	Nominated	
Black Reel Awards	2012	Best Supporting Actor	The Guard	Won	
Black Reel Awards	2017	Best Actor	Miles Ahead	Nominated	
Black Reel Awards	2017	Outstanding Director, Motion Picture	Miles Ahead	Nominated	
Black Reel Awards	2017	Outstanding Screenplay	Miles Ahead	Nominated	
Black Reel Awards for Television	2019	Outstanding Actor, Comedy Series	Black Monday	Won	
Black Reel Awards for Television	2020	Outstanding Actor, Comedy Series	Black Monday	Won	
Blockbuster Entertainment Awards	2001	Favorite Supporting Actor - Comedy/Romance	The Family Man	Nominated	
Critics' Choice Television Awards	2012	Best Actor in a Comedy Series	House of Lies	Nominated	
Critics' Choice Television Awards	2013	Best Actor in a Comedy Series	House of Lies	Nominated	
Christopher Award	2015	Feature Film	St. Vincent	Won	
Gotham Awards	2004	Gotham Tribute	Himself	Honored	
Gotham Awards	2005	Best Ensemble Performance	Crash	Nominated	
Gotham Awards	2007	Best Ensemble Performance	Talk to Me	Won	
Hollywood Film Awards	2005	Ensemble of the Year	Crash	Won	
MTV Movie & TV Awards	2002	Best On-Screen Team	Ocean's Eleven	Nominated	
Nickelodeon Kids' Choice Awards	2017	#Squad	Captain America: Civil War	Nominated	
NAACP Image Awards	1996	Outstanding Supporting Actor in a Motion Picture	Devil in a Blue Dress	Nominated	
NAACP Image Awards	1997	Outstanding Lead Actor in a Television Movie or Mini-Series	Rebound: The Legend of Earl 'The Goat' Manigault	Nominated	
NAACP Image Awards	1998	Outstanding Supporting Actor in a Motion Picture	Rosewood	Nominated	
NAACP Image Awards	1999	Outstanding Supporting Actor in a Motion Picture	Bulworth	Nominated	
NAACP Image Awards	1999	Outstanding Lead Actor in a Television Movie or Mini-Series	The Rat Pack	Nominated	
NAACP Image Awards	2000	Outstanding Lead Actor in a Television Movie/Miniseries/Dramatic Special	A Lesson Before Dying	Nominated	
NAACP Image Awards	2005	Outstanding Actor in a Motion Picture	Hotel Rwanda	Nominated	
NAACP Image Awards	2005	Outstanding Supporting Actor in a Motion Picture	Ocean's Twelve	Nominated	
NAACP Image Awards	2006	Outstanding Supporting Actor in a Motion Picture	Crash	Nominated	
NAACP Image Awards	2008	Outstanding Actor in a Motion Picture	Talk to Me	Nominated	
NAACP Image Awards	2009	Outstanding Actor in a Motion Picture	Traitor	Nominated	
NAACP Image Awards	2011	Outstanding Supporting Actor in a Motion Picture	Brooklyn's Finest	Nominated	
NAACP Image Awards	2012	Outstanding Supporting Actor in a Motion Picture	The Guard	Nominated	
NAACP Image Awards	2013	Outstanding Supporting Actor in a Motion Picture	Flight	Nominated	
NAACP Image Awards	2013	Outstanding Actor in a Comedy Series	House of Lies	Won	
NAACP Image Awards	2014	Outstanding Actor in a Comedy Series	House of Lies	Nominated	
NAACP Image Awards	2015	Outstanding Actor in a Comedy Series	House of Lies	Nominated	
NAACP Image Awards	2016	Outstanding Actor in a Comedy Series	House of Lies	Nominated	
NAACP Image Awards	2016	Outstanding Directing in a Comedy Series	House of Lies	Won	
NAACP Image Awards	2017	Outstanding Actor in a Motion Picture	Miles Ahead	Nominated	
NAACP Image Awards	2017	Outstanding Actor in a Comedy Series	House of Lies	Nominated	
NAACP Image Awards	2020	Outstanding Actor in a Comedy Series	Black Monday	Nominated	
NAACP Image Awards	2021	Outstanding Actor in a Comedy Series	Black Monday	Nominated	
NAACP Image Awards	2022	Outstanding Actor in a Comedy Series	Black Monday	Nominated	
NAACP Image Awards	2024	Outstanding Supporting Actor in a Television Movie, Limited-Series or Dramatic Special	Secret Invasion	Won	
People's Choice Awards	2011	Favorite On-Screen Team	Iron Man 2	Nominated	
Satellite Awards	2000	Best Actor – Miniseries or Television Film	A Lesson Before Dying	Nominated	
Satellite Awards	2005	Best Actor – Motion Picture	Hotel Rwanda	Won	
Satellite Awards	2007	Best Actor – Musical or Comedy	Talk to Me	Nominated	
Satellite Awards	2012	Best Actor – Musical or Comedy	House of Lies	Nominated	
Satellite Awards	2014	Best Actor – Musical or Comedy	House of Lies	Nominated	
Scream Awards	2010	Best Supporting Actor	Iron Man 2	Nominated	
ShoWest Convention	2007	Male Star of the Year Award	Himself	Won	
Teen Choice Awards	2007	Choice Movie: Chemistry	Ocean's Thirteen	Nominated	
Teen Choice Awards	2010	Choice Movie: Fight	Iron Man 2	Nominated	
Teen Choice Awards	2013	Choice Movie: Chemistry	Iron Man 3	Nominated	
Teen Choice Awards	2016	Choice Movie: Chemistry	Captain America: Civil War	Nominated	

== Festivals & Guilds ==
=== Berlin International Film Festival ===
Year	Category	Nominated work	Result	Ref.
2016	Best First Feature Award	Miles Ahead	Nominated	

=== Cleveland International Film Festival ===
Year	Category	Nominated work	Result	Ref.
2016	Music Movies Competition	Miles Ahead	Nominated	

=== Glasgow Film Festival ===
Year	Category	Nominated work	Result	Ref.
2016	Audience Award	Miles Ahead	Nominated	

=== Los Angeles Film Festival ===
Year	Category	Nominated work	Result	Ref.
2008	Spirit of Independence Award	Himself	Won	

=== Palm Springs International Film Festival ===
Year	Category	Nominated work	Result	Ref.
2016	Directors to Watch	Miles Ahead	Won	

== Critics associations ==
Year	Nominated work	Association	Category	Result	Ref.
1995	Devil in a Blue Dress	New York Film Critics Circle Awards	Actor of the Year	Nominated	
1995	Devil in a Blue Dress	Los Angeles Film Critics Association Awards	Best Supporting Actor	Won	
1996	Devil in a Blue Dress	National Society of Film Critics Awards	Best Supporting Actor	Won	
1996	Devil in a Blue Dress	Chicago Film Critics Association Awards	Best Supporting Actor	Nominated	
1996	Devil in a Blue Dress	Chicago Film Critics Association Awards	Most Promising Actor	Nominated	
1998	Boogie Nights	Florida Film Critics Circle Awards	Best Ensemble Cast	Won	
2004	Hotel Rwanda	Washington DC Area Film Critics Association Awards	Best Actor	Nominated	
2004	Hotel Rwanda	San Diego Film Critics Society Awards	Body of Work award	Won	
2004	Hotel Rwanda	New York Film Critics Circle Awards	Best Actor	Nominated	
2005	Hotel Rwanda	Dallas-Fort Worth Film Critics Association Awards	Best Actor	Nominated	
2005	Hotel Rwanda	Online Film Critics Society	Best Actor	Nominated	
2005	Hotel Rwanda	Broadcast Film Critics Association Awards	Best Actor	Nominated	
2005	Ocean's Twelve	Broadcast Film Critics Association Awards	Best Acting Ensemble	Nominated	
2006	Crash	Broadcast Film Critics Association Awards	Best Acting Ensemble	Won	
2006	Crash	London Critics Circle Film Awards	Actor of the Year	Nominated	
2007	Talk to Me	African-American Film Critics Association	Best Actor	Won	
2007	Talk to Me	St. Louis Film Critics Association	Best Actor	Nominated	
2008	Himself	Broadcast Film Critics Association Awards	Joel Siegel Award	Won	
2016	Miles Ahead	Indiana Film Journalists Association	Best Actor	Nominated	
2016	Miles Ahead	North Texas Film Critics Association	Best Actor	Nominated	

== See also ==
- List of Don Cheadle performances
