= List of Don Cheadle performances =

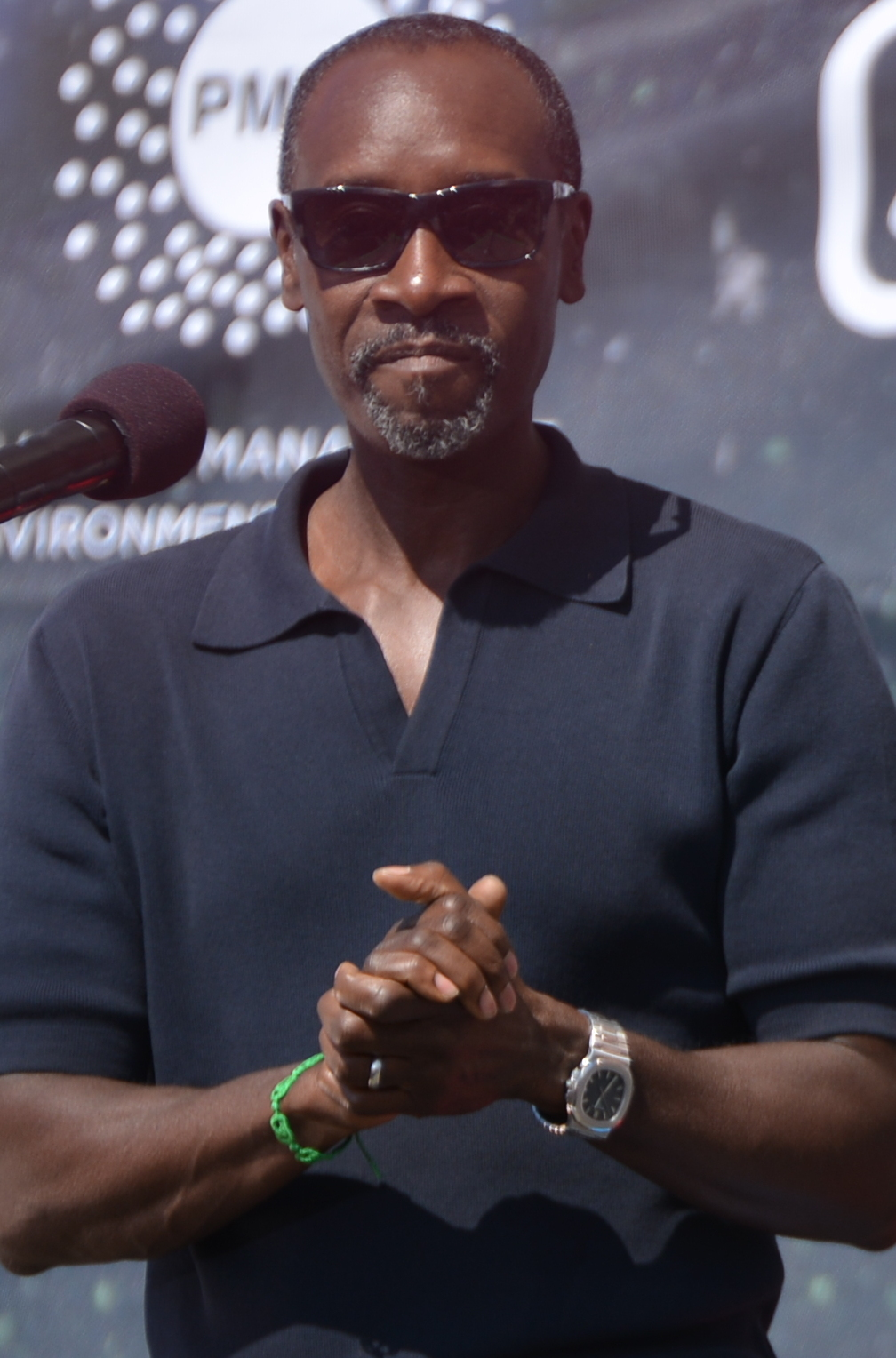
Cheadle in 2015

Don Cheadle is an American actor and producer who has appeared in numerous films and television series since the early 1980s. He has appeared in the films Devil in a Blue Dress (1995), Rebound: The Legend of Earl "The Goat" Manigault as Earl Manigault (1996), Volcano (1997) and Boogie Nights (1997). He won a Golden Globe Award for Best Supporting Actor– Television Film for his portrayal of Sammy Davis Jr. in the 1998 film The Rat Pack.

In 2001, he was cast as Basher Tarr in the first installment of the Ocean's film series. He went on to reprise the role in the 2004 sequel and the 2007 final film of the trilogy. During that time, he starred in the 2004 drama film Hotel Rwanda as Paul Rusesabagina which earned him Best Actor nominations for an Academy Award, Golden Globe and Screen Actors Guild Award. The same year, he was a part of the ensemble cast in the film Crash alongside Sandra Bullock and Matt Dillon.

In 2010, he replaced Terrence Howard in the role of James Rhodes / War Machine / Iron Patriot in the Marvel Cinematic Universe (MCU) film Iron Man 2. He later reprised the role in Iron Man 3 (2013), Avengers: Age of Ultron (2015), Captain America: Civil War (2016), Avengers: Infinity War (2018), Captain Marvel (2019), Avengers: Endgame (2019), and the Disney+ series The Falcon and the Winter Soldier (2021) and What If...? (2021), and miniseries Secret Invasion (2023).

His television work includes appearances in Night Court (1988), The Fresh Prince of Bel-Air (1990), The Golden Palace (1992-1993), Picket Fences (1993–1995), The Bernie Mac Show (2002), ER (2002), and as Marty Kaan in House of Lies (2012–2016) for which he won a Golden Globe Award for Best Actor – Television Series Musical or Comedy. From 2019 to 2021, Cheadle starred in the Showtime comedy Black Monday.

== Acting credits ==
=== Film ===
Year	Title	Role	Notes	Ref.
1984	3 Days	Angel		
1985	Moving Violations	Juicy Burgers Worker		
1987	Hamburger Hill	Pvt. Washburn		
1988	Colors	Rocket		
1993	The Meteor Man	Goldilocks		
1995	Things to Do in Denver When You're Dead	Rooster		
1995	Devil in a Blue Dress	Mouse Alexander		
1997	Volcano	Emmit Reese		
1997	Rosewood	Sylvester Carrier		
1997	Boogie Nights	Buck Swope		
1998	Out of Sight	Maurice Miller		
1998	Bulworth	L.D.		
2000	Traffic	Montel Gordon		
2000	Mission to Mars	Luke Graham		
2000	The Family Man	Cash		
2001	Things Behind the Sun	Chuck		
2001	Rush Hour 2	Kenny	Uncredited cameo	
2001	Manic	Dr. David Monroe		
2001	Swordfish	Agent J.T. Roberts		
2001	Ocean's Eleven	Basher Tarr	Uncredited on VHS release	
2002	The Hire	Passenger	Short film, segment: Ticker	
2003	Abby Singer	Himself	Documentary	
2003	The United States of Leland	Pearl Madison		
2004	Ocean's Twelve	Basher Tarr		
2004	After the Sunset	Henri Mooré		
2004	The Assassination of Richard Nixon	Bonny Simmons		
2004	Hotel Rwanda	Paul Rusesabagina		
2004	Crash	Detective Graham Waters	Also producer	
2006	The Dog Problem	Dr. Nourmand		
2006	King Leopold's Ghost	Narrator	Voice, documentary	
2007	Reign Over Me	Alan Johnson		
2007	Talk to Me	Petey Greene	Also executive producer	
2007	Ocean's Thirteen	Basher Tarr		
2007	Darfur Now	Himself	Documentary, also producer	
2008	Traitor	Samir Horn	Also producer	
2009	Brooklyn's Finest	Clarence 'Tango' Butler		
2009	Hotel for Dogs	Bernie		
2009	The People Speak	Himself	Documentary	
2010	Iron Man 2	Lt. Col. James "Rhodey" Rhodes / War Machine		
2011	The Guard	FBI Agent Wendell Everett		
2012	Flight	Hugh Lang		
2012	La Source	Narrator	Voice, documentary	
2013	Iron Man 3	Col. James "Rhodey" Rhodes / Iron Patriot		
2014	St. Vincent	—N/a	Executive producer only	
2015	Avengers: Age of Ultron	Col. James "Rhodey" Rhodes / War Machine		
2015	Miles Ahead	Miles Davis	Also director, writer and producer	
2016	Kevin Hart: What Now?	Himself		
2016	Captain America: Civil War	Col. James "Rhodey" Rhodes / War Machine		
2018	Avengers: Infinity War	Col. James "Rhodey" Rhodes / War Machine		
2019	Captain Marvel	Col. James "Rhodey" Rhodes / War Machine	Uncredited cameo, mid-credits scene	
2019	Avengers: Endgame	Col. James "Rhodey" Rhodes / War Machine / Iron Patriot		
2021	With/In		Segment: "Intersection"	
2021	No Sudden Move	Curt Goynes		
2021	Space Jam: A New Legacy	Al-G Rhythm		
2022	White Noise	Murray Siskind		
2024	Unstoppable	Sean Charles		
2026	I Love Boosters	Dr. Jack		
TBA	My Darling California †	Cotton	Filming	

Key
†	Denotes films that have not yet been released

=== Television ===
Year	Title	Role	Notes	Ref.
1986	Fame	Henry Lee	2 episodes	
1986	L.A. Law	Julian Tatoon	Episode: "Gibbon Take"	
1986	Sidekicks	Cholo	Episode: "The Last Electric Knight"	
1987	Hill Street Blues	Darius Milton	Episode: "Days of Swine and Roses"	
1987	The Bronx Zoo	Carver	Episode: "Small Victories"	
1988	Night Court	Jack	Episode: "Jung and the Restless"	
1988	Hooperman	Himself	Episode: "High Noon"	
1989	Booker	Himself	Episode: "The Pump"	
1990	China Beach	Angel	Episode: "Warriors"	
1990	The Fresh Prince of Bel-Air	Ice Tray	Episode: "Homeboy, Sweet Homeboy"	
1992–1993	The Golden Palace	Roland Wilson	24 episodes	
1993	Hangin' with Mr. Cooper	Bennie	2 episodes	
1993	Lush Life	Jack	Television film	
1993–1995	Picket Fences	D.A. John Littleton	38 episodes	
1996	Rebound: The Legend of Earl "The Goat" Manigault	Earl Manigault	Television film	
1998	The Rat Pack	Sammy Davis Jr.	Television film	
1999	A Lesson Before Dying	Grant Wiggins	Television film	
2000	The Simpsons	Brother Faith	Voice; episode: "Faith Off"	
2000	Fail Safe	Lt. Jimmy Pierce	Television film	
2002	The Bernie Mac Show	Cousin D	2 episodes	
2002	ER	Paul Nathan	4 episodes	
2003	Mad TV	Perry	Episode #9.3	
2010	Drunk History	Frederick Douglass	Volume 5	
2012–2016	House of Lies	Marty Kaan	58 episodes; also executive producer and director	
2012	30 Rock	Himself	Episode: "Unwindulax"	
2018, 2020	DuckTales	Donald Duck	Voice; 2 episodes	
2019–2021	Black Monday	Maurice Monroe	30 episodes; also executive producer	
2019	Saturday Night Live	Himself	Host; episode: "Don Cheadle/Gary Clark Jr."	
2020	Don’t Look Deeper	Martin	14 episodes	
2021	The Falcon and the Winter Soldier	Col. James "Rhodey" Rhodes	Episode: "New World Order"	
2021	What If...?	Col. James "Rhodey" Rhodes	Voice; episode: "What If... Killmonger Rescued Tony Stark?"	
2021, 2023	Marvel Studios: Assembled	Himself	Documentary; 2 episodes	
2021–2023	The Wonder Years	Dean Williams / Narrator	Main cast	
2022	The Boys Presents: Diabolical	Nubian Prince	Voice; episode: "Nubian Vs. Nubian"	
2023	Agent Elvis	The Commander	Voice; 10 episodes	
2023	Dave	Himself	Episode: "Met Gala"	
2023	Secret Invasion	Raava / Col. James "Rhodey" Rhodes	Miniseries; 6 episodes	
2023	Big Mouth	Himself	Voice; episode: "The International Show"	
2024	Fight Night: The Million Dollar Heist	J.D. Hudson	Miniseries	

Key
†	Denotes television productions that have not yet been released

=== Theatre ===
Year	Title	Role	Playwright	Notes	Ref.
2001	Topdog/Underdog	Booth	Suzan-Lori Parks	The Public Theater, Off-Broadway	
2026	Proof	Robert	David Auburn	Booth Theatre, Broadway debut	

=== Video games ===
Year	Title	Voice Role	Notes	Ref.
2010	Iron Man 2	James "Rhodey" Rhodes / War Machine		
2016	Lego Marvel's Avengers	James "Rhodey" Rhodes / War Machine	Audio archive footage	

=== Music videos ===
Year	Song	Artist	Ref.
1989	"It's the Real Thing"	Angela Winbush	
2014	"Run"	Jay-Z	
2017	"DNA"	Kendrick Lamar	
2017	"1-800-273-8255"	Logic	
