= Unlikely Brothers =

- First edition
- Author: John Prendergast and Michael Mattocks
- Cover artist: Random House (photo)
- Language: English
- Subject: Biography & Autobiography; Memoirs
- Published: May 17, 2011 Random House
- Publication place: United States
- Media type: Hardcover
- Pages: 272
- ISBN: 978-0-307-46484-2 (0-307-46484-9)

Unlikely Brothers: Our Story of Adventure, Loss and Redemption is co-authored by human rights activist and Co-Founder of the Enough Project, John Prendergast and his "Little Brother", Michael Mattocks.

== Summary ==
John Prendergast, at twenty years old, decided to become a Big Brother to Michael Mattocks, a seven-year-old living in a crime-ridden neighborhood in Washington, DC. The book, co-authored by both, describes their different perspectives on their continuing relationship, shared over a period of more than 27 years.

== Reviews ==
- whole living
- Booklist
- O, the Oprah Magazine
- Kirkus' Reviews
- Publishers Weekly
