= The Enough Moment =

2007 book by John Prendergast and Don Cheadle

The Enough Moment: Fighting to End Africa's Worst Human Rights Crimes
- Author: John Prendergast with Don Cheadle
- Cover artist: Finbarr O'Reilly (photo)
- Language: English
- Subject: Human rights
- Published: September 7, 2010 Random House
- Publication place: United States
- Media type: Softback
- Pages: 304
- ISBN: 978-0-307-46482-8 (0-307-46482-2)

The Enough Moment: Fighting to End Africa's Worst Human Rights Crimes is the second book co-authored by actor Don Cheadle, and co-founder of the Enough Project and human rights activist, John Prendergast. Cheadle and Prendergast's first book, Not On Our Watch: The Mission to End Genocide in Darfur and Beyond, was published in 2007.

== Release and Sales ==
The Enough Moment details the efforts of both famous and unknown citizen activists, referred to as “Upstanders,” as they work to combat genocide, sexual violence, and child soldierdom in Africa. The book aims to further fuel public demand for an end to the genocide in the Darfur region of Sudan, the sexual violence in Congo resulting from the deadly trade in conflict minerals, and child soldier recruitment in northern Uganda. The book offers harrowing accounts of how victims of these atrocities have found the strength to help other survivors. The book also describes the actions that U.S. citizens have taken to aid those suffering from human rights abuses and provides practical ways in which ordinary citizens can get involved and make a difference. The book was published by Random House on September 7, 2010.

== Celebrity Testimonies and Interviews ==
Many celebrity "Upstanders" contributed to The Enough Moment. The list includes:

- Ben Affleck
- Sheryl Crow
- Dave Eggers
- Mariska Hargitay
- Angelina Jolie
- Nicole Richie
- Madeleine Albright
- Ann Curry
- Mia Farrow
- Emile Hirsch
- Nicholas Kristof
- Martin Sheen
- Emmanuelle Chriqui
- Annie Duke
- Ryan Gosling
- Iman
- Joel Madden
- Robin Wright
