= The Sentry (organization) =

International humanitarian organization in the United States

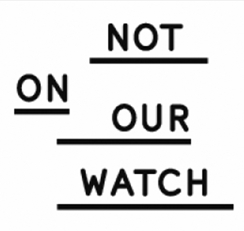
- Founders: Don Cheadle; George Clooney; Matt Damon; Brad Pitt; David Pressman; Jerry Weintraub
- Type: Humanitarian charity
- Purpose: Human rights, civilian protection, and peace
- Location: Los Angeles, California
- Region served: Darfur; global
- Services: Charitable services
- Method: Social services, funding, and awareness
- Website: thesentry.org
- Merged with The Sentry

The Sentry is an American non-profit investigative and policy organization that seeks to disable multinational predatory networks that benefit from violent conflict, repression, and kleptocracy.

== History ==
=== Not on Our Watch ===
The organization was established by Don Cheadle, George Clooney, Matt Damon, Brad Pitt, David Pressman, and Jerry Weintraub in 2008, to bring global attention to human rights violations in Darfur and beyond, while providing resources to assist in putting an end to mass atrocities around the world. The organization has its roots in the book Not on Our Watch written by Don Cheadle and human rights activist John Prendergast, who was also a board member and served as the organization's strategic advisor.

=== The Sentry ===
The Sentry was launched in 2016, producing investigative reports and dossiers on individuals and entities connected to grand corruption and violence. The organization advocates for the use of tools of financial and legal pressure, including anti-money laundering and illicit finance measures, targeted network sanctions, criminal prosecutions, compliance actions by banks and other private companies, and asset recovery.

In February 2019, Not on Our Watch merged with The Sentry (founded in 2016 by Clooney and Prendergast), with the board of directors and scope of work remaining the same.

== Activities ==
Not on Our Watch enlisted the support of artists, activists, and cultural leaders to raise awareness of its activities while partnering directly with the Satellite Sentinel Project, co-founded by George Clooney and John Prendergast.
