= Don Cheadle =

American actor (born 1964)

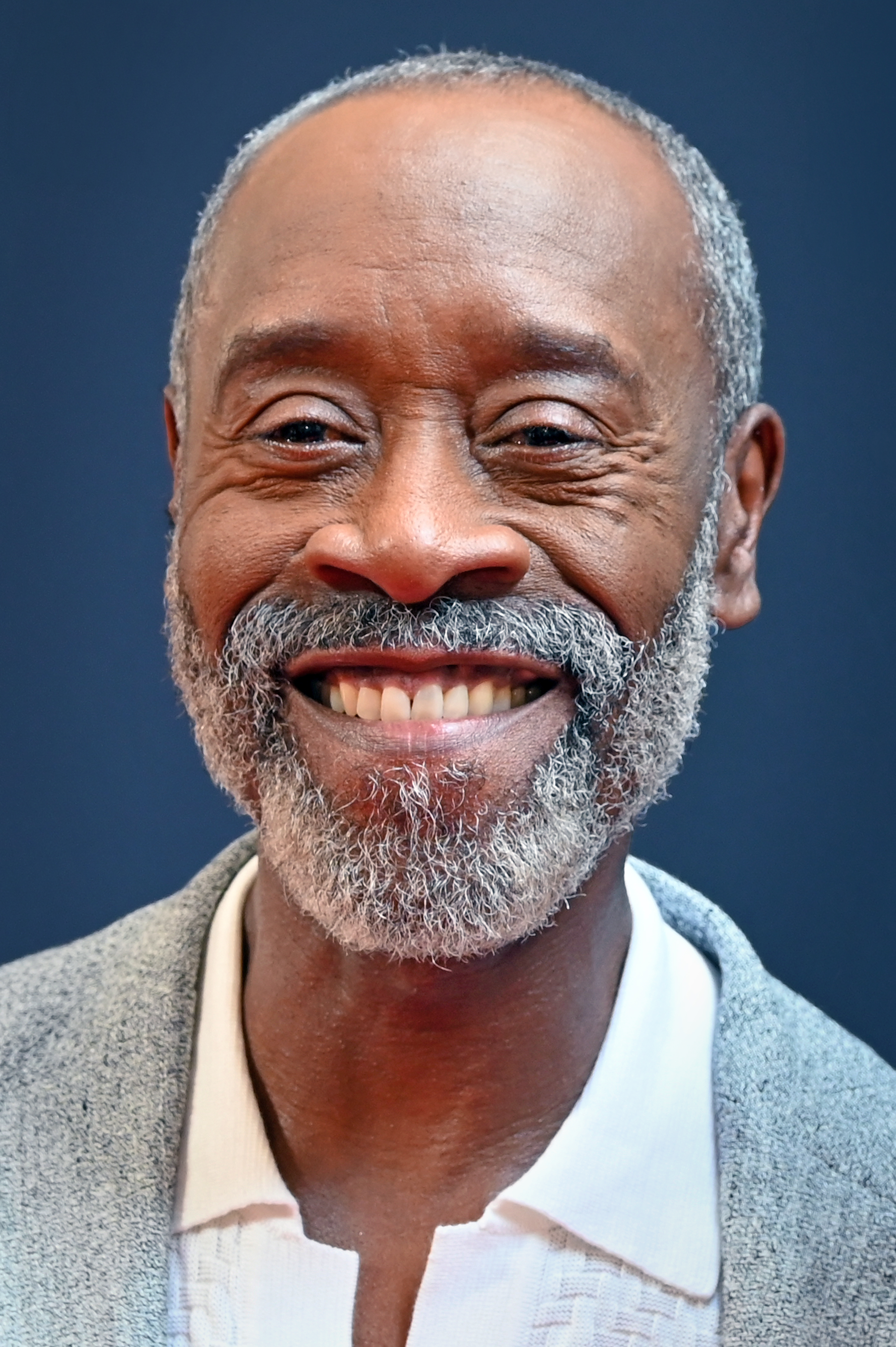
- Cheadle in 2026
- Born: Donald Frank Cheadle Jr. November 29, 1964 (age 61); Kansas City, Missouri, U.S.
- Education: California Institute of the Arts (BFA)
- Occupations: Actor; producer
- Years active: 1984–present
- Organization: The Sentry
- Works: Full list
- Spouse: Bridgid Coulter (m. 2020)
- Children: 2
- Awards: Full list

Donald Frank Cheadle Jr. (/ˈtʃiːdəl/, CHEE-dəl; born November 29, 1964) is an American actor. Known for his roles in film and television, he has received multiple accolades including two Golden Globe Awards, two Grammy Awards, and a Tony Award as well as nominations for an Academy Award, two BAFTA Awards, and 11 Primetime Emmy Awards. He is one of a few actors to have received nominations for the EGOT.

Cheadle's career started with supporting roles in Hamburger Hill (1987), Colors (1988), Devil in a Blue Dress (1995), Rosewood (1997), Boogie Nights (1997), and Bulworth (1998). He collaborated with director Steven Soderbergh acting in Out of Sight (1998), Traffic (2000), The Ocean's Trilogy (2001–2007), and No Sudden Move (2021). Cheadle was nominated for an Academy Award for Best Actor for his portrayal of Paul Rusesabagina in the historical drama film Hotel Rwanda (2004). He was the co-producer of Crash, which won the Academy Award for Best Picture in 2005. Cheadle joined the Marvel Cinematic Universe portraying James "Rhodey" Rhodes / War Machine, beginning with Iron Man 2 (2010), and received an Emmy Award nomination for his performance in the Disney+ series The Falcon and the Winter Soldier (2021).

On television, Cheadle earned nominations for Primetime Emmy Award for Outstanding Lead Actor in a Comedy Series for his roles as Marty Kaan in House of Lies (2012–2016) and Maurice Monroe in Black Monday (2019–2021). He was further Emmy-nominated for The Rat Pack (1998), A Lesson Before Dying (1999), Things Behind the Sun (2001), ER (2002), and The Falcon and the Winter Soldier.

In 2016, he received his first Grammy Award, winning Best Compilation Soundtrack for Visual Media for the soundtrack Miles Ahead. In 2022, he received a second Grammy for Best Spoken Word Album for his narration of the audiobook Carry On: Reflections for a New Generation from John Lewis; he also received a Tony Award for Best Musical as a producer for the musical A Strange Loop.

== Life and career ==
=== Early years and education ===
Cheadle was born on November 29, 1964, in Kansas City, Missouri. His mother is Bettye Cheadle (née North), a teacher, and his father is Donald Frank Cheadle Sr., a clinical psychologist. He has a sister, Cindy, and a brother, Colin. His family moved from city to city throughout his childhood. He attended Hartley Elementary School in Lincoln, Nebraska, from 1970 to 1974. Cheadle graduated in 1982 from East High School in Denver, Colorado. During high school, he played saxophone in the jazz band, sang in choirs, and was active in the theater department, performing in musicals, plays, and mime shows.

Cheadle went on to attend the California Institute of the Arts, graduating with a Bachelor of Fine Arts in theater in 1986.

=== 1984–1992: Early roles and theatre work ===
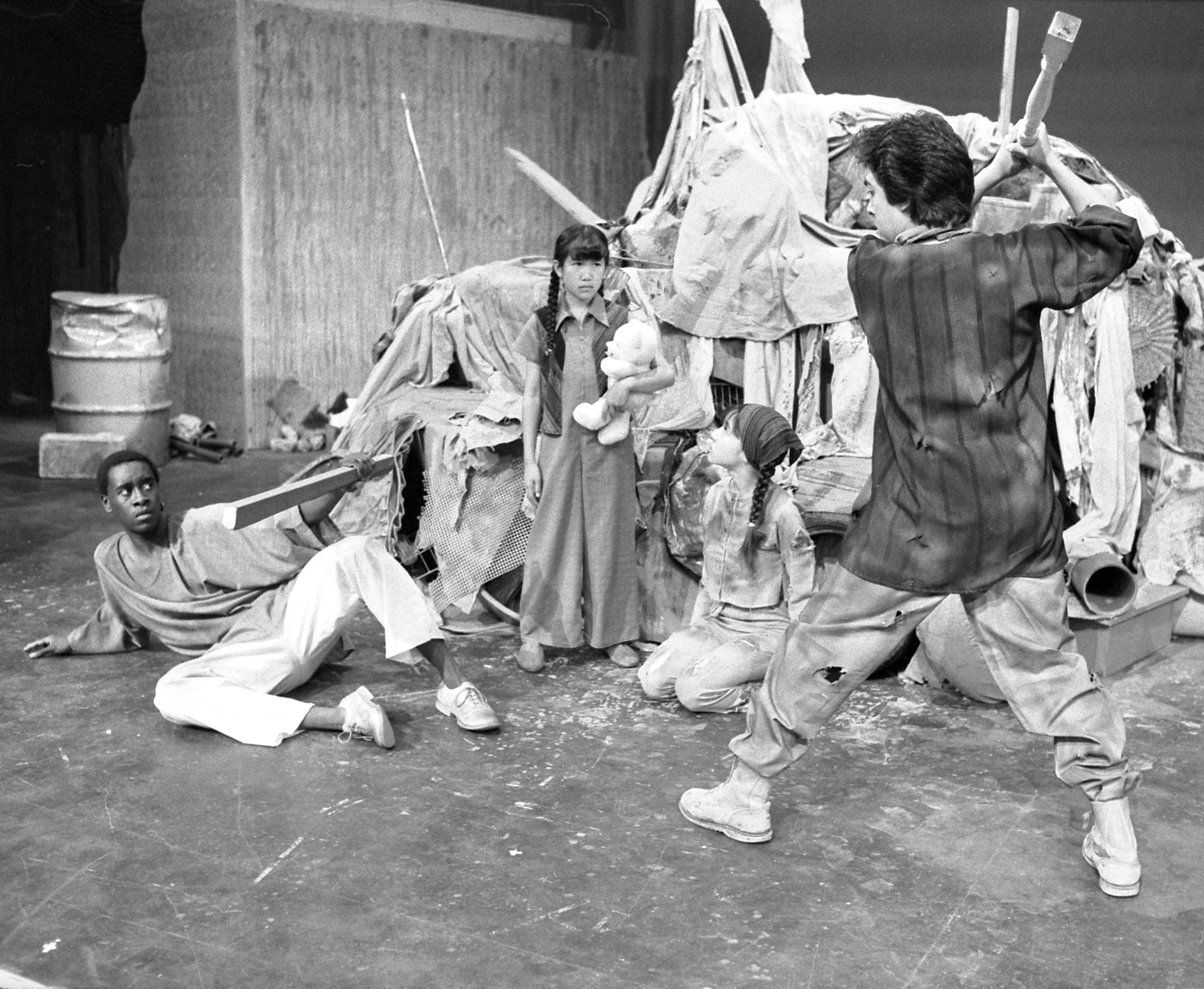
Cheadle, Kelly Chan, Janice Kawaye, and Richard Coca in the Ensemble Studio Theatre production of "My Name Could Be Anne" in Los Angeles (1986).

During his time at CalArts, Cheadle along with his friends acted in numerous plays such as Athol Fugard's "Master Harold"...and the Boys, The Island; and My Name Could Be Anne in the black box theater. Cheadle became eligible for his Screen Actors Guild card when he appeared as a burger joint employee in the 1985 comedy Moving Violations. In 1987, he received a small role in the 7th season of Hill Street Blues, where he played a teenager with learning difficulties. This was followed by an appearance in Hamburger Hill the same year. Cheadle secured the role of Jack in the April 1, 1988, "Jung and the Restless" episode of Night Court; although his character was 16 years old, Cheadle was 23 at the time.

Cheadle then played the role of Rocket in the 1988 movie Colors. In 1989, he appeared in a music video for Angela Winbush's number-two hit single "It's the Real Thing" as a car wash employee performing dance moves. In 1990, he appeared in an episode of The Fresh Prince of Bel-Air titled "Homeboy, Sweet Homeboy", playing Will Smith's friend and Hilary's first love interest, Ice Tray. In 1992, he had a starring role in The Golden Girls spin-off The Golden Palace as Roland Wilson, a young serious hotel manager that Blanche, Rose, and Sophia had retained from the previous owners. He subsequently played district attorney John Littleton on three seasons of Picket Fences.

=== 1993–2001: Rise to prominence ===
Cheadle first received widespread notice for his portrayal of Mouse Alexander in the 1995 film Devil in a Blue Dress, for which he won Best Supporting Actor awards from the Los Angeles Film Critics Association and the National Society of Film Critics and earned nominations for similar awards from the Screen Actors Guild and the NAACP Image Awards. Following soon thereafter was his performance in the title role of the 1996 HBO TV movie Rebound: The Legend of Earl "The Goat" Manigault. In 1997, he starred in John Singleton's historical drama Rosewood and in the disaster film Volcano. In the same year, he appeared in Paul Thomas Anderson's period drama Boogie Nights. The following year, he appeared in Out of Sight. The film was an adaptation of Elmore Leonard's 1996 novel of the same name and the first of Cheadle's many collaborations with director Steven Soderbergh.

Cheadle's portrayal of Sammy Davis Jr. in the 1998 TV movie The Rat Pack won him a Golden Globe Award and an Emmy nomination. A year later he starred as Grant Wiggins, a school teacher in the film A Lesson Before Dying, which won the Primetime Emmy Award for Outstanding Television Movie. It was based on the novel of the same name by Ernest J. Gaines. He had two major film roles in 2000, starring as Montel Gordon, a DEA agent in Traffic and as Luke Graham in the sci-fi film Mission to Mars. The following year, he played Basher Tarr in the heist film Ocean's Eleven, a remake of the 1960 Rat Pack original. He joined an ensemble cast including George Clooney, Brad Pitt, Matt Damon, Andy García, and Julia Roberts, and reprised his role for the sequels Ocean's Twelve in 2004 and Ocean's Thirteen in 2007. He starred alongside Hugh Jackman and John Travolta in the 2001 action thriller film Swordfish. Also in the same year, he appeared in a minor role in Rush Hour 2 with Jackie Chan and Chris Tucker.

Cheadle made a guest appearance in the ninth season of the television series ER, playing the role of Paul Nathan, a medical student who suffers from Parkinson's disease. For this performance, he was nominated for an Emmy Award in the category of Outstanding Guest Actor in a Drama Series.

=== 2002–2009: Established actor ===
Cheadle appeared in NFL commercials promoting the Super Bowl from 2002 to 2005. He so regularly appeared for the NFL in its Super Bowl advertising that in 2006, in a drive to get fans to submit their own advertising ideas, the NFL sought his permission to reference his previous commercials to portray themselves as having no new ideas: "he quickly signed off on the idea and found it funny." Abe Sutton (along with Etan Bednarsh), one of the finalists in this NFL contest, played on this commercial by proposing an ad in which every player on a football team is Don Cheadle.

In 2005, Cheadle was nominated for the Academy Award for Best Actor for his portrayal of Paul Rusesabagina in the film Hotel Rwanda. He also starred in and co-produced Crash, which won the 2006 Academy Award for Best Picture. For his performance in Crash, Cheadle was nominated for the BAFTA and Screen Actors Guild awards for Best Supporting Actor. He played the main character in the movie Traitor.

In March 2007, Cheadle starred with comedian Adam Sandler in Mike Binder's Reign Over Me, a comedy-drama about a man who has slipped away from reality after the death of his wife and three daughters on 9/11. The film was a box office flop, earning a domestic gross of $22.2 million. Cheadle later starred in the 2009 DreamWorks Pictures film Hotel for Dogs. Cheadle was to make his directorial debut with the adaptation of Elmore Leonard's Tishomingo Blues, but in July 2007, he stated, "'Tishomingo' is dead..."

In 2009, Cheadle and Boondocks creator Aaron McGruder worked on a potential comedy show on NBC. The "project revolve[d] around mismatched brothers who reunite to open a private security company." Cheadle and McGruder were slated to serve as executive producers, while McGruder was expected to write the script.

Also in 2009, Cheadle performed in The People Speak, a documentary feature film that uses dramatic and musical performances of the letters, diaries, and speeches of everyday Americans, based on historian Howard Zinn's A People's History of the United States and its companion volume Voices of a People's History of the United States.

=== 2010–2020: Acclaim and Marvel films ===
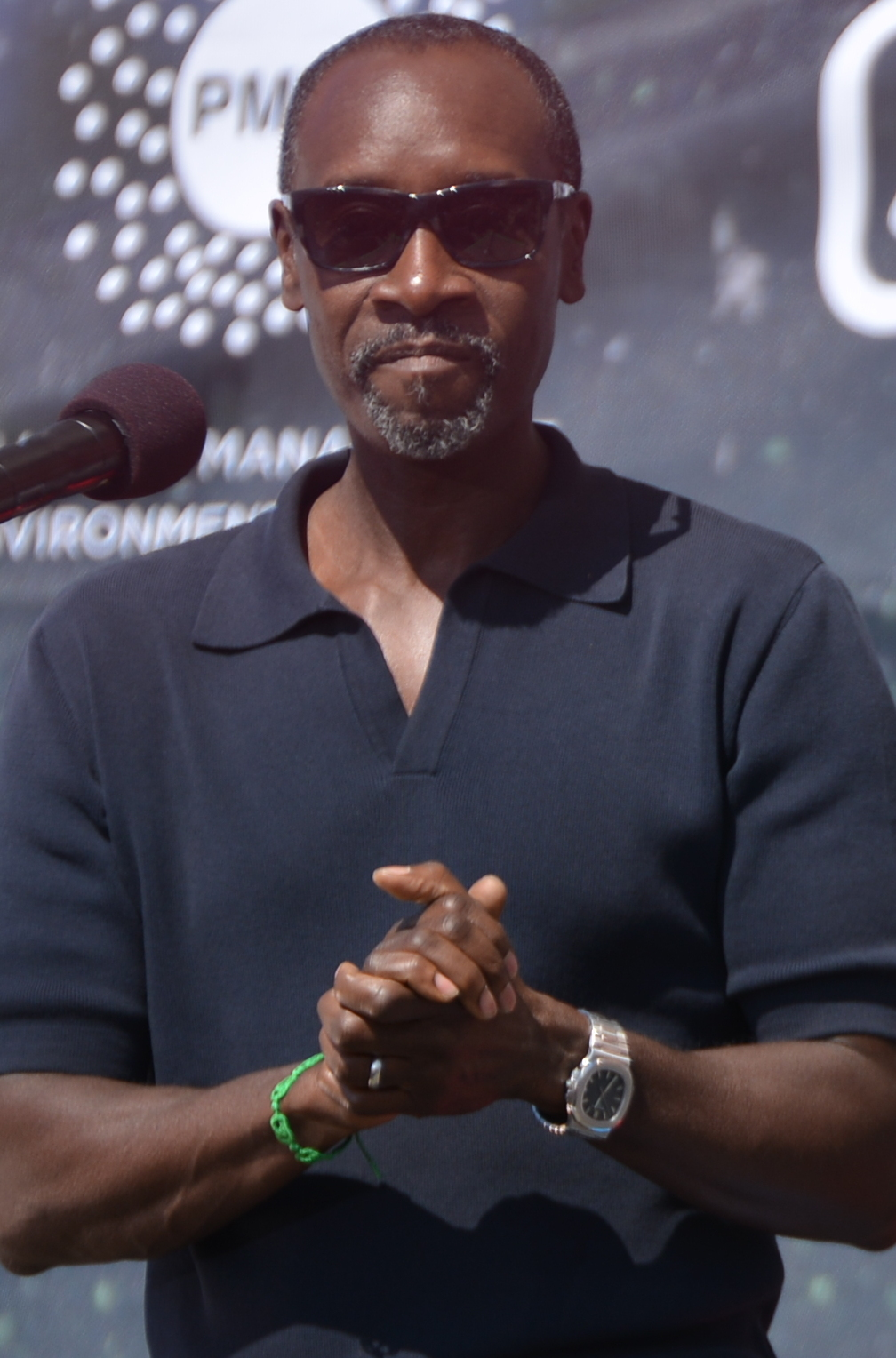
Cheadle in 2015

In 2010, Cheadle assumed the role of James "Rhodey" Rhodes / War Machine in Iron Man 2 (2010), replacing Terrence Howard. Cheadle reprised this role in the films Iron Man 3 (2013) as the Iron Patriot, Avengers: Age of Ultron (2015), Captain America: Civil War (2016), Avengers: Infinity War (2018), Captain Marvel (2019), and Avengers: Endgame (2019), as well as the Disney+ TV series The Falcon and the Winter Soldier (2021), What If...? (2021), Secret Invasion (2023) and the upcoming theatrical film Armor Wars (TBA).

From 2012 to 2016, Cheadle starred in the Showtime TV series House of Lies. In 2013, he won the Golden Globe as Best Actor in a Comedy Series for his role on the show. He was in the show for five seasons until it ended in 2016.

Cheadle spent 10 years writing and producing the film Miles Ahead (2016) based on the life of jazz musician Miles Davis. Cheadle also directed and starred in the film. Locations for the movie were found in Cincinnati.

In 2018, Cheadle guest-starred in the first-season finale of DuckTales, providing Donald Duck's new voice box. He later guest-starred again in 2020 during season three after a wish Donald made to Gene the Genie had altered reality.

=== 2021–present ===
In 2021, Cheadle starred in the period crime thriller No Sudden Move, in which he played Curt Goynes, a gangster in 1950s Detroit. Around that same year, Cheadle played a villain role in Space Jam: A New Legacy, portraying the role of the main antagonist Al-G Rhythm.

In February 2024, it was announced that Cheadle had joined the main cast for Peacock's crime drama miniseries Fight Night: The Million Dollar Heist. Cheadle co-starred in the biographical wrestling drama Unstoppable. Based on the life of wrestler Anthony Robles, Cheadle portrayed Sean Charles, his head coach. The feature premiered at the Toronto International Film Festival in September, followed by a limited theatrical release in December 2024.

In April 2026, Cheadle made his Broadway debut in a revival of David Auburn's play Proof.

== Activism and political views ==
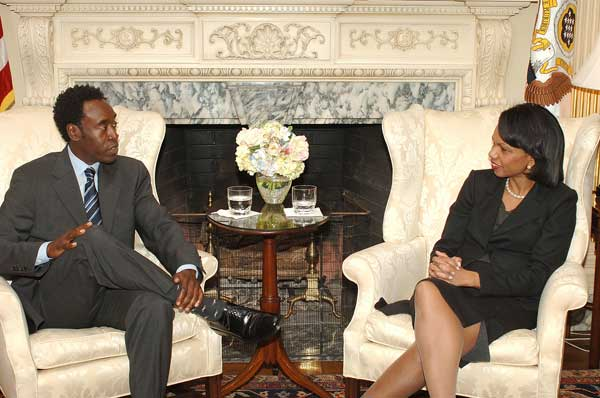
Cheadle with Secretary of State Condoleezza Rice at the US State Department in 2007

Cheadle has campaigned to end the genocide in Darfur, Sudan. Cheadle and John Prendergast co-authored a book about this issue entitled Not on Our Watch: The Mission to End Genocide in Darfur and Beyond. With George Clooney, Brad Pitt, Matt Damon, David Pressman, and Jerry Weintraub, Cheadle co-founded the Not on Our Watch Project, an organization focusing global attention and resources to stop and prevent mass atrocities. Cheadle was awarded the BET Humanitarian award of the year in 2007 for his humanitarian work for the people of Darfur and Rwanda.

At the 2007 World Series of Poker, Cheadle and poker player Annie Duke organized an annual charity poker tournament, Ante Up for Africa.

On December 13, 2007, Cheadle and fellow actor Clooney were presented with the Summit Peace Award by the Nobel Peace Prize Laureates in Rome for their work to stop the genocide and relieve the suffering of the people of Darfur.

Cheadle has worked with the United Nations on climate change concerns. He and Harrison Ford created a documentary event series entitled Years of Living Dangerously that provided first-hand reports on those affected by, and seeking solutions to climate change. He is also on the advisory board of Citizens' Climate Lobby.

In 2010, Cheadle was named U.N. Environment Program Goodwill Ambassador. Also in 2010, he and Prendergast published their second book: The Enough Moment: Fighting to End Africa's Worst Human Rights Crimes.

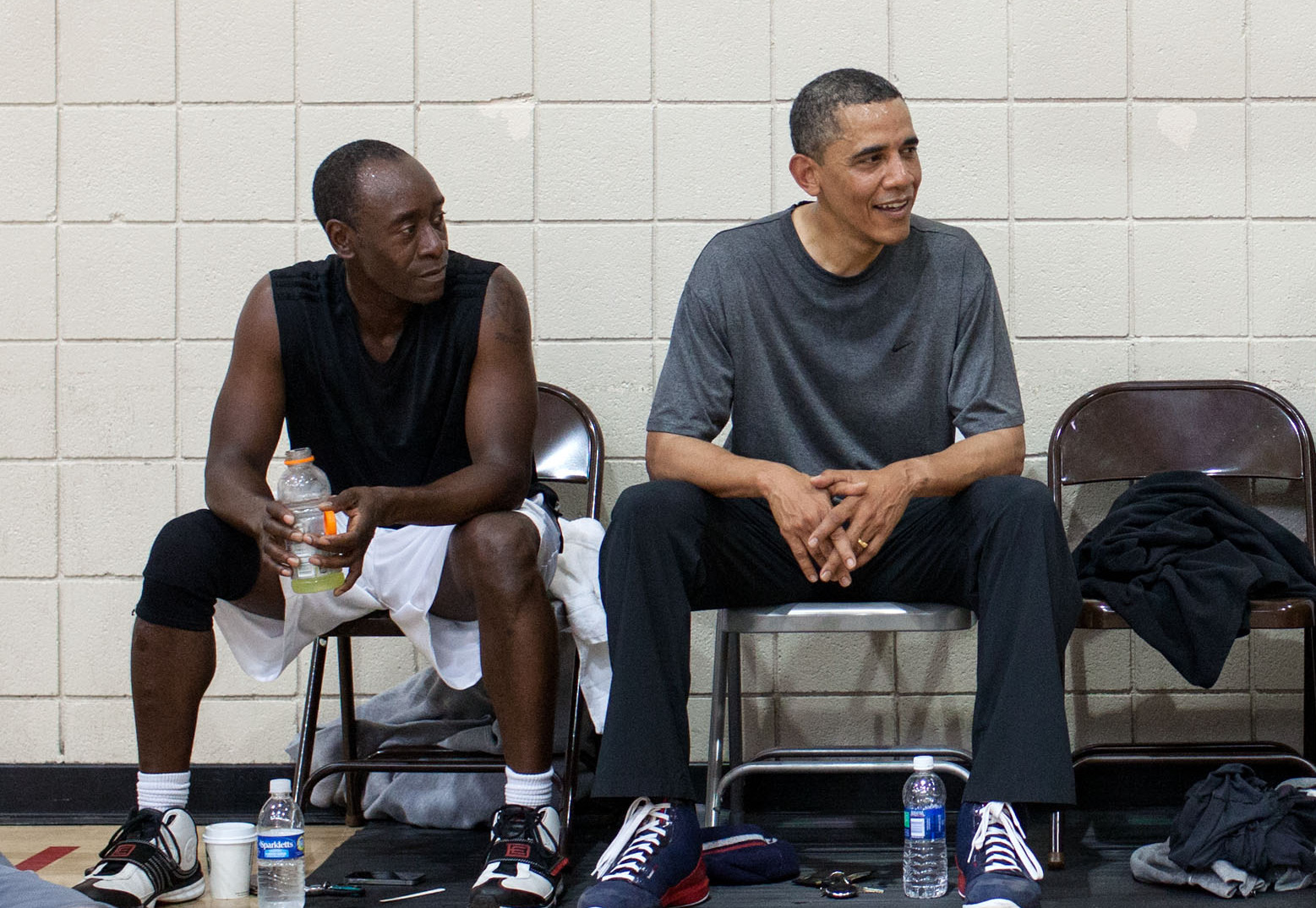
Cheadle with President Barack Obama after playing basketball in Los Angeles (2012)

Cheadle has expressed support for the Democratic Party throughout his career. He donated to both of Barack Obama's 2008 and 2012 presidential campaigns, stating "He's my candidate, and I think you have to put your money where your mouth is". He appeared in an online video encouraging Americans to vote against Donald Trump in the then-upcoming presidential election. He joined fellow Avengers cast members and Vice Presidential nominee Kamala Harris for a virtual fundraiser supporting Joe Biden's 2020 campaign. In 2024, Cheadle, along with his Avengers castmates, once again came together to endorse Harris in her presidential bid.

In 2017, Cheadle endorsed the film The Promise, a movie about the Armenian genocide, stating “I’ve seen the effects of genocide up-close and personally in Darfur. And I am going to keep the promise, raise awareness and fight genocide around the world, wherever it may occur.”

On his 2019 Saturday Night Live appearance, he wore a T-shirt saying "protect trans kids".

== Personal life ==
In 2008, Cheadle's family history was profiled on the PBS series African American Lives. The family history revealed that Cheadle's ancestors had been owned by the Chickasaw Nation, who had refused to free their slaves until 1866. Cheadle's ancestors did not hold either U.S. or Chickasaw citizenship until the 1890s, due to the Dawes Commission. A DNA test taken by the show revealed that Cheadle is of Cameroonian descent. Another DNA test revealed that among his African ancestry, one-third comes from the region from Senegal to Liberia, just over one-quarter comes from the Congo-Angola region, and the rest comes from western Nigeria and Benin.

Cheadle married his long-time partner, actress and Rosewood co-star Bridgid Coulter, in early 2020. They have been together for more than 28 years, and have two children.

== Acting credits and accolades ==
Cheadle is the recipient of multiple accolades, including two Grammy Awards, a Tony Award, two Golden Globe Awards, and two Screen Actors Guild Awards. He has also earned nominations for an Academy Award, two British Academy Film Awards, and 11 Primetime Emmy Awards. His Emmy, Grammy, Oscar, and Tony nominations make him one of few black individuals to be nominated for the four major American entertainment awards (EGOT).

== See also ==
- African-American Tony nominees and winners
- List of African-American actors
- List of actors with Academy Award nominations
- List of black Academy Award winners and nominees
- List of black Golden Globe Award winners and nominees
- List of Golden Globe winners
