= Satellite Sentinel Project =

Nonprofit organization

- Founded: 2010
- Founder: George Clooney, John Prendergast
- Type: Nonprofit organization
- Purpose: Civilian protection, and humanitarian response
- Location: United States
- Method: Satellite imagery analysis and field reports
- Website: thesentry.org

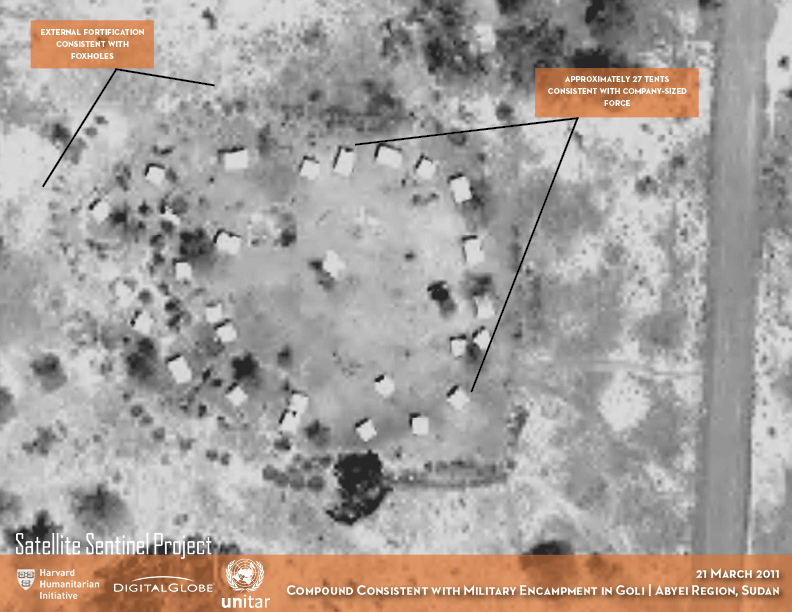
Evidence of Northern-aligned forces deployed to Abyei Region, Sudan (21 March 2011)

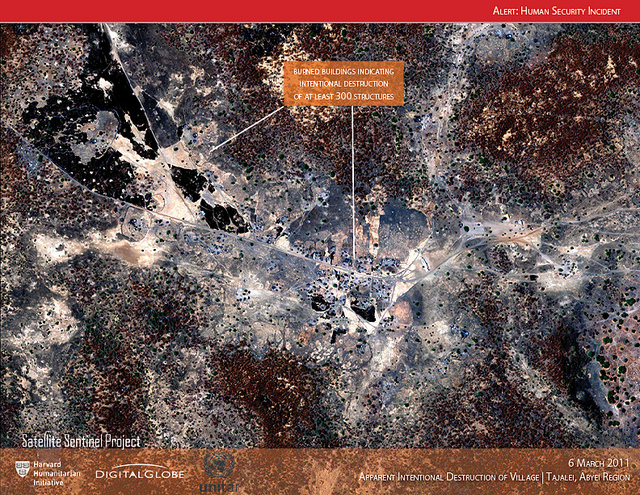
Satellite image of the burning of Tajalei, Sudan (6 March 2011)

The Satellite Sentinel Project (SSP) was conceived by George Clooney and Enough Project co-founder John Prendergast during their October 2010 visit to South Sudan. Through the use of satellite imagery, SSP provides an early warning system to deter mass atrocities in a given situation by focusing world attention and generating rapid responses to human rights and human security concerns taking place in that situation.

== Activities ==
SSP currently produces reports on the state of the conflict in the border regions between Sudan and South Sudan. DigitalGlobe provides satellite imagery and analysis. Their reporting is then released to the press and policymakers by the Enough Project. In 2011, the Satellite Sentinel Project detected images of freshly-dug mass grave sites in the South Kordofan, a state of South Sudan, where Sudanese military forces had killed members of a black ethnic minority suspected to support South Sudanese forces. SSP was the first to provide evidence consistent with the razing of the villages of Maker Abior, Todach, and Tajalei in the Abyei region of Sudan, and the project has discovered eight alleged mass graves in South Kordofan, Sudan. SSP also planned to investigate how illegal trade in diamonds, gold and ivory was used to fund human-rights abusers.

== Organization and funding ==
Not On Our Watch Project provided seed money to launch the Satellite Sentinel Project. The Enough Project contributes field reports, policy analysis and communications strategy, and, together with Not On Our Watch and its SUDANNOW partners, pressures policymakers by urging the public to act. Google and Internet strategy firm Trellon, LLC collaborate to design the web platform.

== Limits to effectiveness ==
Patrick Meier, a crisis mapping expert, has observed that the deterrent value of any surveillance is diminished in the absence of consequences for the perpetrators of violence. Specific to Sudan, other technologies such as drones are necessary to differentiate threats from nomads in order to generate actionable information.
