= Bobby Slayton =

American actor and comedian

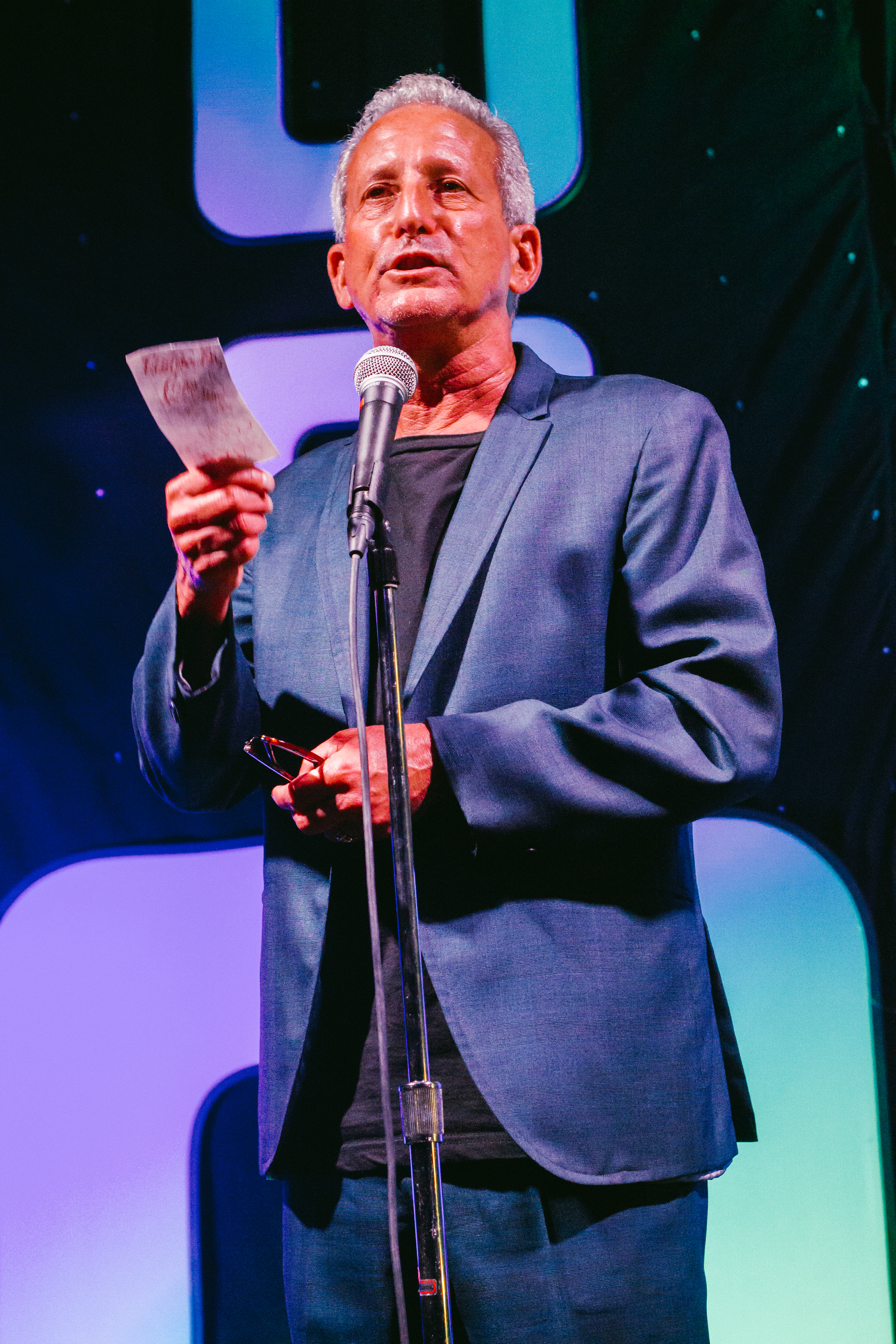
- Slayton at the Moontower Comedy Festival in 2014
- Born: Robert Michael Slayton; May 25, 1955 (age 71); Scarsdale, New York, U.S.
- Other names: The Pitbull of Comedy; Yid Vicious
- Occupations: Actor; comedian
- Years active: 1977–present
- Spouse: Teddie Lee Tillett (m. 1988; died 2016)
- Children: 1

Comedy career
- Medium: Stand-up; film; television
- Genre: Blue comedy
- Website: www.bobbyslayton.com

Robert Michael Slayton (born May 25, 1955) is an American actor, writer, and stand-up comedian. Slayton is known for a supporting role in the 2001 film Bandits, and as a frequent guest on The Adam Carolla Show (2006–2009). He has also made guest appearances on multiple sitcoms and animated shows.

== Career ==
Slayton is known for his intense style of stand-up comedy. He adopts a mixed style of complaining, insulting, personal story-telling, not entirely unlike Sam Kinison.

He has been featured on many popular radio shows across the country including Howard Stern, Kevin and Bean, Tom Leykis, and Dave, Shelly, and Chainsaw. He played Joey Bishop in the 1998 movie The Rat Pack and a character named simply "Slayton" in The Mind of the Married Man. He also appeared as himself on the IFC television show "Maron" in 2013. Slayton also played a TV comedian in Tim Burton's film Ed Wood, and as a casino manager, asking "Chili Palmer", John Travolta, for help locating a late paying casino player, in Get Shorty.

Slayton has a distinctive gravelly voice. He performed voiceovers on animated shows like Family Guy and Dr. Katz, Professional Therapist.

He has appeared on many television shows including The Tonight Show, Politically Incorrect, as well as Comic Relief and his own stand-up special on HBO.

== Personal life ==
Slayton was raised in a Jewish home and often jokes about his own Jewish ethnicity. He lives in Los Angeles and has one daughter, singer Natasha Slayton, from the girl group G.R.L.

In 1988, Slayton married Teddie Lee Tillett. Tillett died in March 2016. In June 2017, Slayton and his daughter sued the Sherman Oaks Hospital for wrongful death, claiming the doctors did not properly diagnose her pneumonia. In November 2017, the two sides settled.

== Filmography ==
=== As writer ===
Year	Title	Notes
1997	Dr. Katz, Professional Therapist	Additional materials, 1 episode
2009	Just for Laughs	Writer, 1 episode

=== Film ===
Year	Title	Role	Notes
1989	Martians Go Home	Stand Up Martian	
1990	To The Moon, Alice	Gameshow Comic	Short film
1993	Wayne's World 2	Watermelon Guy	
1994	Ed Wood	TV Show Host	
1994	The Shaggy Dog	Coach Evans	TV Movie
1995	Get Shorty	Dick Allen	
1998	The Rat Pack	Joey Bishop	TV Movie
2000	Loser	Hal	
2001	Bandits	Darren Head	
2002	The Third Wheel	Dave Bowen	
2003	Dickie Roberts: Former Child Star	Commentator	
2006	Dreamgirls	Miami Comic	
2008	Bryan Loves You	Interviewer	
2014	Mentor	Bobby	TV short
2015	A Beautiful Now	Mr. Rich	
2017	Wonder Wheel	Fishing Buddy	
2018	Sweeney Killing Sweeney	Gene	
2020	Ballbuster	Smegman	
2020	Rifkin's Festival	Festivalgoer	

=== Television ===
Year	Title	Role	Notes
1987	CBS Summer Playhouse	Eddie	1 episode
1992	Nightmare Cafe	Harry Tambor	1 episode
1994	Duckman: Private Dick/Family Man	Vile Kyle's bodyguard	Voice, 1 episode
1996	Clueless	Barry Lipton	1 episode
1997	Dr. Katz, Professional Therapist	Bobby	Voice, 1 episode
1997	The Tom Show	Dr. Peter Stengel	2 episodes
1998	Home Improvement	Roy Becker	1 episode
1998-1999	Brother's Keeper	Marty	2 episodes
1999	Family Guy	Leonard Cornfeathers	Voice, 1 episode
1999	Get Real	Bill	1 episode
2001-2002	The Mind of the Married Man	Slayton	8 episodes
2004	Brandy & Mr. Whiskers	Lorenzo	Voice, 2 episodes
2009	Glenn Martin DDS		Voice, 1 episode
2010	Sonny with a Chance	Hank	1 episode
2013	Maron	Himself	1 episode
2016	Crisis in Six Scenes	Mel	Mini series, 1 episode
2020	Curb Your Enthusiasm	Carl	1 episode
2020	The Comedy Kitchen Podcast	Himself	Mini series, 1 episode

=== Comedy ===
Year	Title	Notes
2010	Bobby Slayton: Born to Be Bobby	TV special, also writer and executive producer

=== Podcasts ===
Year	Title	Role	Notes
2006	The Twilight Zone Radio Dramas	Peter Jenson, Douglas Winter	Voice, 2 episodes
2011	WTF with Marc Maron	Himself	1 episode
2016	Gilbert Gottfried's Amazing Colossal Podcast	Himself	1 episode
2021	Reza Rifts	Himself	1 episode

=== Video Games ===
Year	Title	Role	Notes
1994	Carolines Presents… Johnny Cocktails	Johnny Cocktails	Voice

== Discography ==
- Raging Bully – CD, 1998
- I've Come For Your Children – CD, 2003
- Built For Destruction – CD, 2006
- Born To Be Bobby – DVD, 2010
