= John Prendergast (activist) =

American human rights and anti-corruption activist

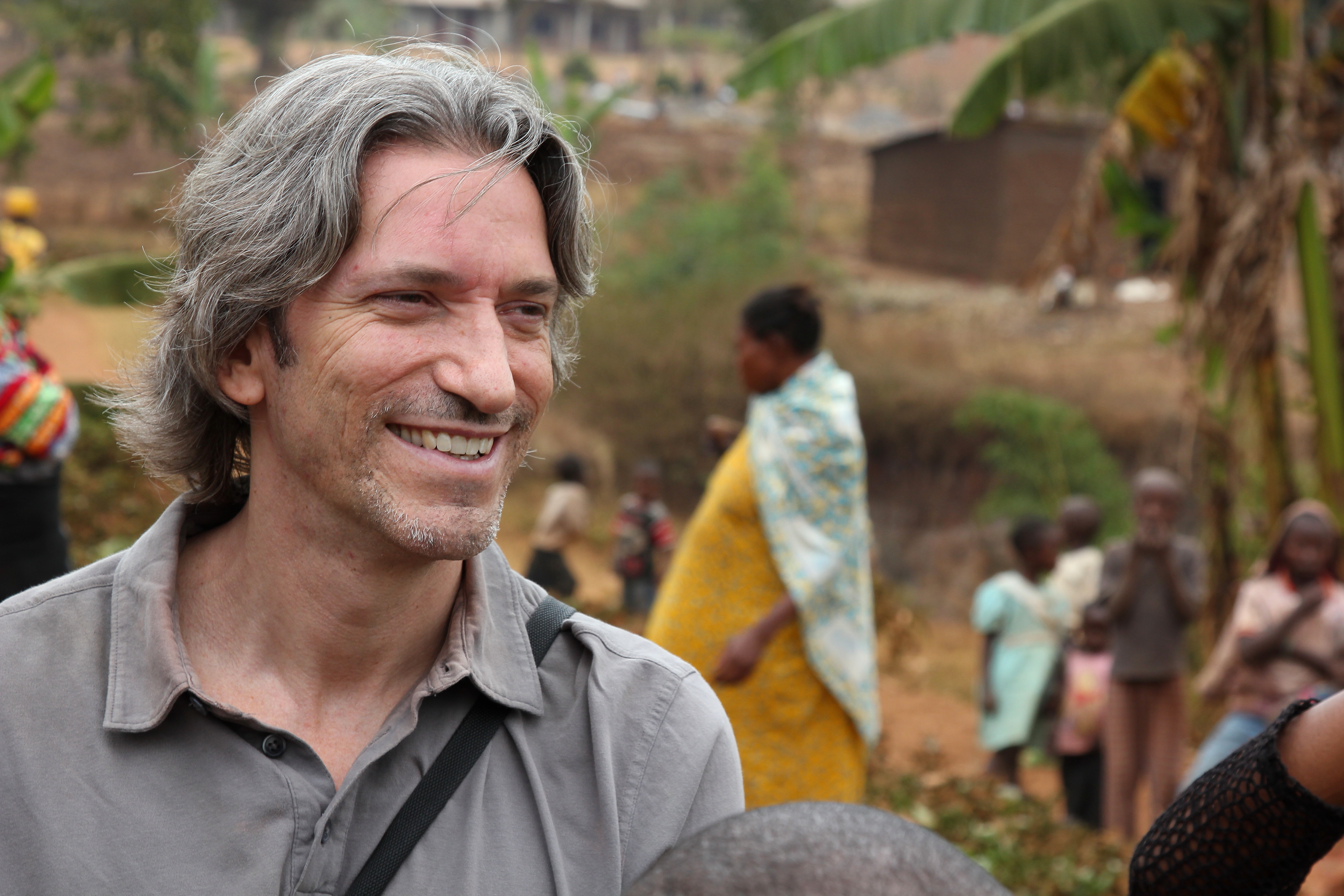
- Prendergast in DR Congo in 2010
- Born: Indianapolis, Indiana, U.S.
- Education: Temple University, American University
- Occupations: Author, human rights activist
- Writing career
- Notable awards: Huffington Post 2011 Game Changer Award United Nations Correspondents Association Citizen of the World Award Lyndon Baines Johnson Moral Courage Award Princeton University Crystal Tiger Award U.S. State Department Distinguished Service Award The Center for African Peace and Conflict Resolution Peace Award

John Prendergast is an American human rights and anti-corruption activist as well as an author. He is the co-founder of The Sentry, an investigative and policy organization that seeks to disable multinational predatory networks that benefit from violent conflict, repression, and kleptocracy. Prendergast was the founding director of the Enough Project and was formerly director for African affairs at the National Security Council.

== Career ==
Prendergast worked for a variety of organizations in the U.S. and Africa in the latter half of the 1980s and the first half of the 1990s, focusing primarily on peace and human rights. At the end of 1996, he joined the National Security Council as Director for African Affairs and thereafter served as a special adviser to Susan Rice at the United States Department of State. As a special adviser, Prendergast was a member of the team behind the two-and-a-half-year U.S. effort to broker an end to the Eritrean–Ethiopian War. He was also part of the peace processes for Burundi, Sudan and DR Congo. Prendergast worked for the Clinton White House and two members of Congress, and left government in 2001 to become Special Adviser to the President of the International Crisis Group on Africa issues. Outside of government, he has worked for organizations such as the United States Institute of Peace, UNICEF, and Human Rights Watch.

Alongside Gayle Smith, Prendergast co-founded the Enough Project in 2007. The policy organization aims at countering genocide and crimes against humanity. He is also a co-founder along with George Clooney of The Sentry, an investigative initiative created to uncover the financial networks behind conflicts in Africa. Together, Clooney and Prendergast had also previously co-founded the Satellite Sentinel Project, which aimed to prevent conflict and human rights abuses through satellite imagery. In 2020, Prendergast was named the Strategic Director of the Clooney Foundation for Justice. Other initiatives of Prendergast include founding the Darfur Dream Team Sister Schools Program with Tracy McGrady and other NBA players, which funded schools in Darfurian refugee camps and created partnerships with schools in the U.S., as well as the Raise Hope for Congo campaign, highlighting the issue of conflict minerals fueling war in Congo and supporting a more comprehensive peace process.

Prendergast has been a visiting professor at universities and colleges, including Yale Law School, Stanford University, and Columbia University. He has been awarded seven honorary doctorates, and serves as the Anne Evans Estabrook Human Rights Senior Fellow at Kean University.

== Media ==
Prendergast has written extensively on Africa and is the author or co-author of eleven books. His 2018 book Congo Stories: Battling Five Centuries of Exploitation and Greed was co-authored with Congolese activist Fidel Bafilemba and featured photographs by Ryan Gosling. His two books prior to that were co-authored with actor and activist Don Cheadle. Those are Not On Our Watch, a New York Times bestseller and NAACP non-fiction book of the year, and The Enough Moment: Fighting to End Africa's Worst Humanitarian Crimes. He is currently working on a project concerning the Democratic Republic of the Congo with Gosling and New Yorker writer Kelefa Sanneh.

Prendergast has appeared in five episodes of 60 Minutes and traveled to Africa with Dateline NBC, ABC's Nightline, the PBS NewsHour with Jim Lehrer and CNN’s Inside Africa, Newsweek/The Daily Beast, and The New York Times Magazine. He has also appeared in several documentaries, including: Merci Congo, Sand and Sorrow, Darfur Now, 3 Points, and War Child. He co-produced Journey Into Sunset, and is Executive Producer of Staging Hope: Acts of Peace in Northern Uganda, both about Northern Uganda. He also appeared in 2014 film The Good Lie.

Comedian Jane Bussmann was inspired by his work and meetings with him to write her 2012 book The Worst Date Ever: or How it Took a Comedy Writer to Expose Joseph Kony and Africa's Secret War, a comic/tragic story of her attempt as a novice foreign correspondent to expose the truth about the war in Uganda. He is also the primary subject in another book by Bussmann, A Journey to the Dark Heart of Nameless Unspeakable Evil.

== Criticism ==
Prendergast's activism has been criticized by Mahmood Mamdani as simplistic, counter-productive, and detrimental to the reality on the ground, especially regarding Darfur and Northern Uganda.

== Publications ==
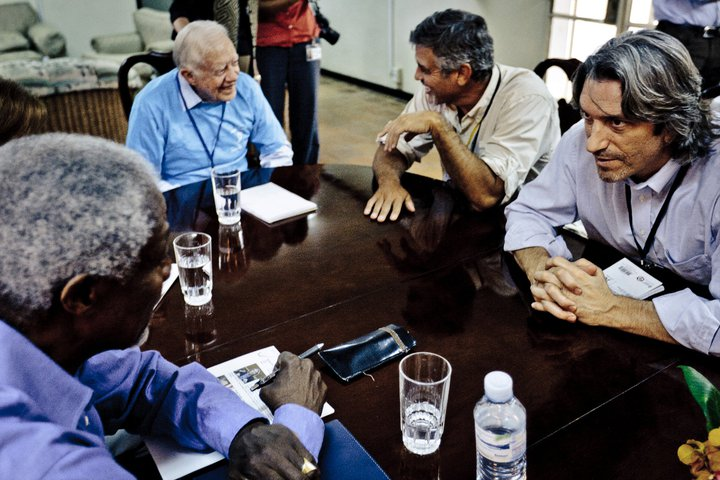
Prendergast in South Sudan during the Southern Sudanese independence referendum, 2011, with Kofi Annan, Jimmy Carter, and George Clooney

Articles

- "George Clooney on Sudan’s Rape of Darfur". Co-authored with George Clooney and Akshaya Kumar. The New York Times, February 25, 2015.
- "Sanctions threats not enough in South Sudan". Co-authored with George Clooney and Akshaya Kumar. CNN, June 25, 2015.
- "How to Destroy a War Economy". Foreign Affairs, August 10, 2015. Published by the Council on Foreign Relations.
- "War crimes shouldn’t pay in South Sudan". Co-authored with George Clooney. The Washington Post, September 12, 2016.
- "Stop the Cash, Stop the Conflict". Co-authored with George Clooney. Originally published in The Economist, November 21, 2016.
- "A New Tool to Fight Genocide". Co-authored with Brad Brooks-Rubin. Foreign Affairs, December 15, 2016. Published by the Council on Foreign Relations.
- "Modernize, don’t remove, Sudan’s sanctions". Co-authored with Brad Brooks-Rubin. The Hill, January 18, 2017.
- "Congo's violent kleptocracy at a crossroads". Co-authored with Sasha Lezhnev. Fox News, February 4, 2017.
- "British banks are go-betweens in global conflict. This can be stopped". Co-authored with George Clooney. The Guardian, February 20, 2017.
- "South Sudan’s government-made famine". Co-authored with George Clooney. The Washington Post, March 9, 2017.
- “The Key to Making Peace in Africa”. Co-authored with George Clooney. Foreign Affairs, Vol. 97, No. 2, March 14, 2018. Published by the Council on Foreign Relations.
- "Our World Runs on Resources Looted From Congo. That's Why Democratic Elections Alone Can't Solve the Country's Problems". Co-authored with Sasha Lezhnev. Time, December 28, 2018.
- "George Clooney and John Prendergast: Sudan needs more than words. It needs action". Co-authored with George Clooney. The Washington Post, April 14, 2019.
- "George Clooney & John Prendergast: Violence is the business model in South Sudan". Co-authored with George Clooney. USA Today, October 3, 2019.

Books

- Peace, Development, and People of the Horn of Africa. Co-authored with Bread for the World (Organization). Washington D.C.: Institute on Hunger & Development, Center of Concern, 1992. ISBN 978-0-9628058-2-0
- Civilian Devastation: Abuses by All Parties in the War in Southern Sudan. Co-authored with Jemera Rone and Karen Sorensen. Human Rights Watch, 1994. ISBN 978-1-56432-129-9
- Without Troops & Tanks: The Emergency Relief Desk and the Cross Border Operation into Eritrea and Tigray. Co-authored by Mark R. Duffield. The Red Sea Press, 1994. ISBN 978-1-56902-003-6
- Crisis Response: Humanitarian Band-aids in Sudan and Somalia. Washington, D.C.: Center of Concern, 1997. ISBN 978-0-585-38030-8
- Frontline Diplomacy: Humanitarian Aid and Conflict in Africa. Co-authored with the Center of Concern. L. Rienner, 1996 ISBN 978-1-55587-696-8
- God, Oil & Country: Changing the Logic of War in Sudan. Africa Report #39. International Crisis Group, January 28, 2002.
- Blood and Soil: Land, Politics and Conflict Prevention in Zimbabwe and South Africa. International Crisis Group, 2004. ISBN 978-0-9760853-0-0
- Crafting Peace: Strategies to Deal with Warlords in Collapsing States. Co-authored by Sasha Lezhnev. Lexington Books, 2006. ISBN 978-0-7391-1765-1
- Not On Our Watch : The Mission to End Genocide in Darfur and Beyond. Co-authored with Don Cheadle. Hyperion, 2007. ISBN 978-1-4013-0335-8
- The Enough Moment: Fighting to End Africa's Worst Human Rights Crimes. Co-authored by Don Cheadle. Random House, 2010. ISBN 978-0-307-46482-8
- Unlikely Brothers. Co-authored by Michael Mattocks. Random House, May 17, 2011. ISBN 978-0-307-46484-2
- Congo Stories: Battling Five Centuries of Exploitation and Greed. Co-authored by Fidel Bafilemba. Grand Central Publishing, December 4, 2018. ISBN 978-1-4555-8464-2
