= Not on Our Watch =

Non-fiction book on genocide in Darfur, Sudan

Not On Our Watch: The Mission to End Genocide in Darfur and Beyond
- Cover showing a Darfur refugee
- Author: Don Cheadle; John Prendergast
- Cover artist: Phil Rose
- Language: English
- Subject: Human rights
- Publisher: Hyperion
- Publication date: May 1, 2007
- Publication place: United States
- Media type: Softback
- Pages: 192
- ISBN: 1-4013-0335-8
- OCLC: 123129055
- LC Class: DT159.6.D27 C54 2007

Not On Our Watch: The Mission to End Genocide in Darfur and Beyond is a non-fiction book co-authored by actor Don Cheadle and human rights activist and co-founder of the Enough Project, John Prendergast.

== Release and sales ==
A New York Times bestseller, the book discusses the situation in Sudan's Darfur region and other cases of mass atrocities. The book outlines ways in which ordinary citizens can take action to end ongoing tragedies in Darfur, northern Uganda, the Democratic Republic of Congo and elsewhere. Holocaust survivor Elie Wiesel contributed with a foreword, and then-Senator Barack Obama and Senator Sam Brownback wrote the book's introduction. A European/UK edition of the book was published by Maverick House Publishers in August 2007.

A portion of the proceeds are being donated to the Enough Project, a joint initiative of the International Crisis Group and the Center for American Progress to abolish genocide and mass atrocities.

== See also ==
- The Enough Moment: Fighting to End Africa's Worst Human Rights Crimes
