= A Lesson Before Dying (film) =

1999 film by Joseph Sargent

- Based on: A Lesson Before Dying by Ernest J. Gaines
- Written by: Ann Peacock
- Directed by: Joseph Sargent
- Starring: Don Cheadle; Cicely Tyson; Mekhi Phifer; Irma P. Hall; Brent Jennings
- Theme music composer: Ernest Troost
- Country of origin: United States
- Original language: English

Production
- Cinematography: Donald M. Morgan
- Editor: Michael Brown
- Running time: 105 minutes
- Production companies: Ellen M. Krass Productions; HBO NYC Productions; Spanky Pictures

Original release
- Network: HBO
- Release: May 22, 1999

A Lesson Before Dying is a 1999 American made-for-television drama film adapted from the 1993 novel of the same name by Ernest J. Gaines. It won the Primetime Emmy Award for Outstanding Television Movie and a Peabody Award.

== Cast and characters ==
- Don Cheadle as Grant Wiggins
- Cicely Tyson as Tante Lou
- Mekhi Phifer as Jefferson
- Irma P. Hall as Miss Emma
- Brent Jennings as Reverend Ambrose
- Lisa Arrindell Anderson as Vivian Baptiste
- Frank Hoyt Taylor as Sheriff Guidry
- Stuart Culpepper as Henri Pichot
- Patty Mack as Inez
- Elijah Kelley as Clarence
- Wynton Yates as Louis Washington
- Clay Chappell as Paul
- Cierra Meche as Estelle
