= A Lesson Before Dying =

1993 novel by Ernest J. Gaines

- Author: Ernest J. Gaines
- Language: English
- Publisher: Knopf Publishing Group
- Publication date: 1993
- Publication place: United States
- Media type: Print (paperback)
- Pages: 256 pp
- ISBN: 978-0-375-70270-9
- OCLC: 438410499

A Lesson Before Dying is a 1993 novel by Ernest J. Gaines. The novel is based on the true story of Willie Francis, a young Black American man best known for surviving a failed electrocution in the state of Louisiana, in 1946. It won the National Book Critics Circle Award.

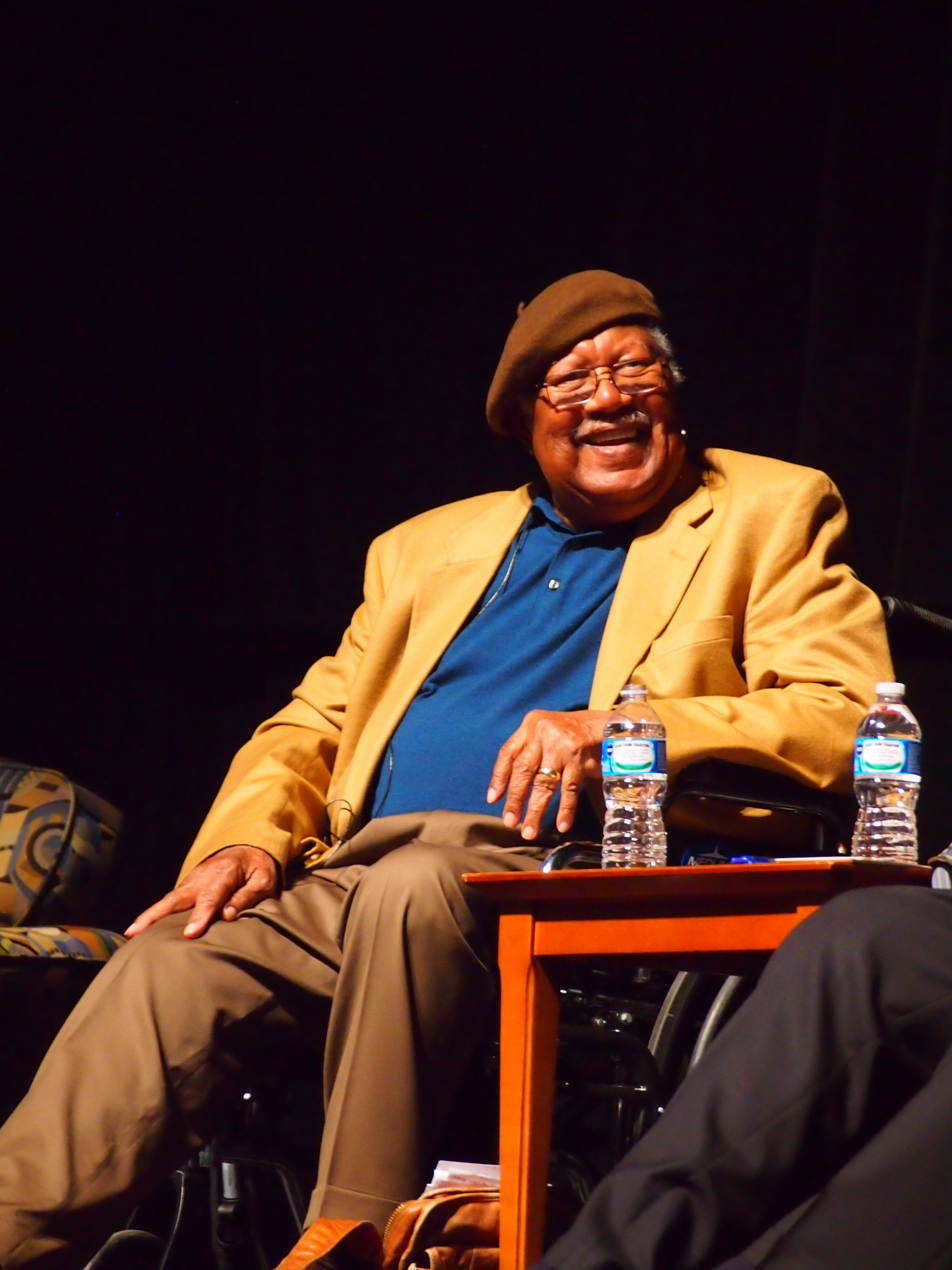
Ernest J. Gaines, author of A Lesson Before Dying

== Plot ==
=== Part 1 ===
Set in Louisiana, this novel is set in the late 1940s backdrop, of a small Cajun community during the Jim Crow Era. Jefferson, a young black man, is accused and convicted of a murder for perpetrating a shoot-out in a liquor store which left three men killed. Being the sole survivor of a crime that occurred unwittingly, Jefferson is sentenced to death. The story unfolds his search for justice as within his trial, Jefferson's attorney explains to the jury "What justice would there be to take his life? Justice, gentlemen? Why, I would as soon put a hog in the electric chair as this." Jefferson's godmother, Miss Emma Glenn, and Tante (Aunt) Lou, the aunt of local school teacher Grant Wiggins, ask Lou's nephew Wiggins to turn Jefferson from a "hog" to a "man". Grant is, at first, unsure of helping Jefferson, believing he would not be much help. Grant eventually agrees to teach Jefferson as his love for his family and their feelings is more important to him than his own beliefs on the situation. However, in order to accomplish this they must first get permission from Sheriff Sam Guidry. They successfully ask Sheriff Guidry's brother-in-law Henri Pichot, whose family Miss Emma served for years, for assistance. Wiggins, who left his hometown for tertiary education, has returned from university to teach locally. Whilst Wiggins takes the job in contemplation of whether to maintain his position or to completely move away from the place of his childhood, both Jefferson's godmother and his aunt successfully persuade him to go on a prison-visit and impart wisdom to Jefferson before his death.

=== Part 2 ===
Over the course of the novel, Grant and Jefferson unexpectedly form a close friendship as the two men both come to comprehend the importance of resistance and defying conformity. As they understand compassion, human struggles and existential revelations through their newfound brotherhood, Grant also forms a bond with a white deputy, Paul Bonin. In early February, it is announced that Jefferson will be executed soon, on April 8. Around then, Reverend Ambrose becomes concerned that Grant, an agnostic, is not teaching Jefferson about God and thus begins to visit him regularly to reverse Grant's spiritual impairments. The conflict reaches a head when Grant buys Jefferson a radio, which the seniors in the black community, or "quarter", see as sinful. Before Jefferson’s execution, Grant brings him a notebook to help and find his identity. This notebook is also used as a way for Jefferson to process his thoughts surrounding his prison sentence and impending execution. The novel ends with the anticlimax of Jefferson's death by electrocution. Grant did not attend the execution, worried he could not control his emotions witnessing his dear friend’s death. Much to Grant's surprise, Paul visits him and says that "Jefferson was the strongest man in that crowded room.”

== Characters ==
Grant Wiggins

The narrator of the novel is an African American school teacher whose main task is to teach Jefferson how to die “like a man.” Grant is a very educated man who struggles with finding purpose, transforms with Jefferson throughout the novel.

Jefferson

An African American man who at the start of the novel goes to trial for a crime he did not commit. Jefferson, who is called “a hog” in court, is sentenced to death. Jefferson, with the help of Grant and his concern for his family, learns to die “like a man.”

Miss Emma

Jefferson’s godmother, who asked Grant to teach Jefferson. Miss Emma wants Jefferson to die “like a man” and believes Grant can teach him how.

Tante Lou

Grant’s aunt and also the person who raised him. She is very religious and cares deeply for her family.

Vivian

Grant’s girlfriend, who works as a teacher as well, yet in a much nicer school. Vivian has two children with her husband; their divorce is pending. Grant and Vivian’s relationship is kept mostly hidden as Vivian is worried her husband would take custody of their children if he found out about Grant.

Reverend Ambrose

A preacher who visits Jefferson in jail, teaching him how to die with faith. Grant and the Reverend do not always agree on faith or the way Jefferson thinks of religion.

== Themes ==
=== Education ===
Education is a very important theme in A Lesson Before Dying. Education is shown through Grant and Vivian being school teachers. Without the education Grant received, he would have never been asked to help Jefferson. Therefore, Jefferson would not learn to die “like a man” and Grant would never learn to live as one. The way education is presented changes throughout the story. For example, at the start of the novel, Grant is presented as a very strict instructor who does not see hope in teaching the students as most will not make it out of their hometown or end up like Jefferson. Grant, at the start of the novel, also never wanted to teach Jefferson as he thought it is a waste of time and energy as Jefferson was already on death row, that nothing Grant could do would help. Throughout the book, Grant is taught by Vivian that even if he could help just one student it would be worth it. Grant also helps and instructs Jefferson who learns to die “like a man.” Both men were able to teach one another about morality, the importance of community, as well as their purpose.

=== Identity ===
Identity is a major theme in the novel A Lesson Before Dying. Identity is the driving force of the novel. Identity is trying to be discovered by the main two characters of the book, Grant and Jefferson. Jefferson’s search for identity, prompted by Miss Emma, is to find how to die “like a man.” The search for Jefferson’s identity brought on the help of Grant. Throughout the book, Grant realized his need to find his own identity and sense of purpose. Though Grant is asked to help Jefferson find the meaning of his life, Grant also had to discover what it meant to live as a man.

=== Importance of community ===
Importance of community is shown throughout the novel. Community rallies together in support of Jefferson and his family. One way the importance of community is shown in the novel is through Grant traveling around town collecting money to pay for a radio for Jefferson. Additionally, the importance of community is shown through Jefferson’s last visit from Grant where Grant brings his students. The students bring Jefferson gifts, some give him hugs, and others kind words. All of these examples show how the importance of community is shown throughout the novel.

== Background ==
=== Social context ===
The book provides perspective on the status of African Americans in the South after World War II and before the Civil Rights Movement. It shows the Jim Crow American South through the eyes of a formally educated African-American teacher who often feels helpless and alienated from his own country. In the novel, Grant is the only educated black man in the area and the only member of the black community who might be considered capable of becoming free of overt oppression. The character feels his life and career choices are severely limited due to racial prejudices, an example of this in the novel being his instinct to refer to white male authority figures as "Sir". In order to break away from his social conditions, Grant's yearning to escape this situation heightens over time throughout the story. Grant feels that he is cornered by myriad forces: his aunt's incessant desires, pressures to conform to a fundamentalist religion that he does not believe, the children's needs to fulfill his role as a teacher, and the community's craving for proper leadership.

=== Setting ===
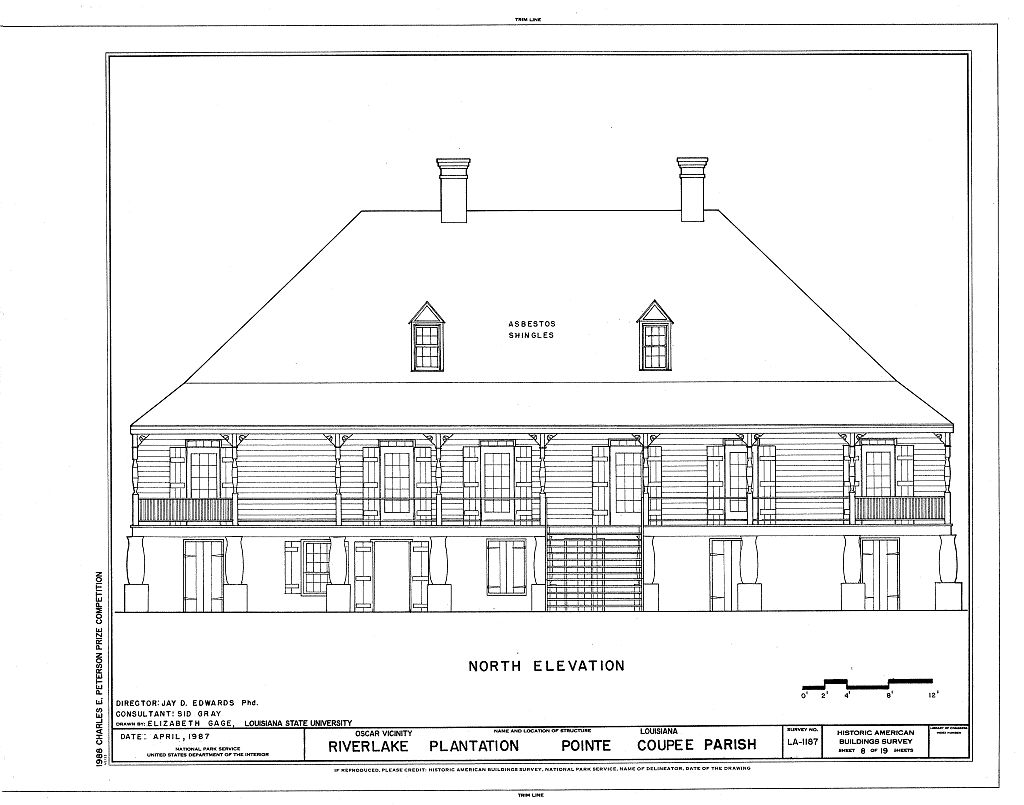
Riverlake Plantation, located in Louisiana, in Pointe Coupee Parish. This Plantation is Ernest Gaines' childhood home and serves as inspiration for A Lesson Before Dying.

This novel is set in a fictional town called Bayonne, located in the rural south of Louisiana. Ernest Gaines uses his childhood home, town, and surrounding areas as inspiration for the novel. Riverlake Plantation, Ernest Gaines childhood home, was used as a setting for part of the novel. Located in the Jim Crow South, segregation and racism is shown throughout the novel as it affects everyday life of those living in this small town. Important areas in the novel would be the schoolhouse that Grant teaches at which is also the church, the jail where Jefferson resides, and the characters homes.

== Title ==
The title of this novel refers to Grant's attempts to teach Jefferson a lesson. In order for Grant to be able to show Jefferson how to 'become a man,' he must understand the meaning himself before imparting his learning to another person. In the novel, the butterfly acts as a symbol towards the end as proof that both of these men have succeeded in their goals to be spiritually transcended.

"...I watched it fly over the ditch and down into the quarter, I watched it until I could not see it anymore. Yes, I told myself. It is finally over."

At this point Grant realizes that Jefferson truly did learn a 'lesson before dying.' When he says "It is finally over," he is not only referring to Jefferson's life, but states it as a double entendre that also acknowledges his cowardly nature before enlightenment is "finally over". The character has fully taken a stand for what he believes in. This insures that he, too, has benefited from this entire experience. Jefferson's life is sacrificed in order for the white people in the community to gain a better understanding of the value of the black members in all societies.

== Film, TV & theatrical adaptations ==
On May 22, 1999 HBO premiered A Lesson Before Dying, which subsequently received two Emmy Awards for Outstanding Television Movie and Outstanding Writing for a Mini-Series or Movie (South African screenwriter Ann Peacock) and a Peabody Award. Don Cheadle portrays Grant, Mekhi Phifer portrays Jefferson, and Cicely Tyson is featured as Tante Lou.

A play by Romulus Linney and a Southern Writers' Project, based on the novel and having the same title, had its world premiere at the Alabama Shakespeare Festival in January 2000 and Off-Broadway in September 2000. Rooted Theater Company (East New York, Brooklyn) staged a production of A Lesson Before Dying in June 2017.

== Awards and nominations ==
- 1993 National Book Critics Circle Award for Fiction
- October 1997 choice of Oprah's Book Club
