= Traitor (film) =

2008 thriller movie directed by Jeffrey Nachmanoff

- Theatrical release poster
- Directed by: Jeffrey Nachmanoff
- Screenplay by: Jeffrey Nachmanoff
- Story by: Steve Martin; Jeffrey Nachmanoff
- Produced by: David Hoberman; Todd Lieberman; Don Cheadle; Jeff Silver
- Starring: Don Cheadle; Guy Pearce; Said Taghmaoui; Neal McDonough; Alyy Khan; Jeff Daniels
- Cinematography: J. Michael Muro
- Edited by: Billy Fox
- Music by: Mark Kilian
- Production companies: Overture Films; Mandeville Films; Hyde Park Entertainment; Crescendo Productions
- Distributed by: Overture Films (United States); Paramount Vantage (International)
- Release date: August 27, 2008
- Running time: 114 minutes
- Country: United States
- Language: English
- Budget: $22 million
- Box office: $27.6 million

Traitor is a 2008 American spy thriller film written and directed by Jeffrey Nachmanoff, based on a story by Steve Martin. In the film, a former Sudanese-American soldier (Don Cheadle) with a background in explosives is the prime suspect in a search by an FBI Special Agent (Guy Pearce) for the bomb-maker in a string of global terror explosions aimed at civilians.

The film was released on August 27, 2008. It received generally positive reviews from critics and grossed $27 million against its $22 million budget.

== Plot ==
Samir Horn is an Arabic-speaking Sudanese-American and devout Muslim. His Sudanese father was killed by a car bomb when he was a child. As an adult, Samir is first seen operating as an arms dealer. While negotiating a deal with Omar in Yemen, he is arrested and thrown into a Yemeni jail. Later, Samir and Omar become friends, and when Omar's people arrange an escape, they take Samir with them. They meet Fareed, a lieutenant in the al-Nathir terrorist organization. FBI Special Agent Roy Clayton suspects Samir has been radicalized and begins tracking him.

Joining al-Nathir, Samir uses the skills he learned as a Special Forces Engineer Sergeant with the U.S. Army Special Forces to bomb the U.S. Consulate in Nice, France. It is revealed that Samir is working deep undercover for a U.S. intelligence contractor, Carter. Samir is devastated when he learns that despite his and Carter's covert efforts, innocent people perished in the consulate bombing.

Impressed with Samir, Fareed introduces him to leader Nathir, who discloses a plot to place suicide bombers on 50 buses in the US during Thanksgiving. He instructs Samir to act as liaison to each of the al-Nathir sleeper bombers. Later, Carter unwittingly interrupts a meeting between Samir and Omar, and Omar kills Carter.

Samir reveals his deep cover to Clayton, who tracks him to Halifax, Nova Scotia, Canada. While investigating, Clayton also discovers the deaths in Nice were fake, save for one. While on board a cargo ship to Marseille, France, Samir kills Nathir and Fareed. He tells an enraged Omar that by targeting innocents, they betrayed Islam. Samir then tells Omar that he switched the bombers' emails and placed them all on the same bus, so all of them died without victims (except for the driver of the one bus). The Canadian police and the FBI storm the area, kill Omar and injure Samir.

Samir later tells Clayton he feels guilty for killing innocent people, and that the Qur'an says that to kill an innocent person is to kill all mankind. Clayton responds by noting that the Qur'an also says that by saving an innocent person, he has saved all mankind. He tells Samir he is a hero and assures him of a possible career with the FBI.

== Cast ==
- Don Cheadle as Samir Horn
- Guy Pearce as FBI Special Agent Roy Clayton
- Saïd Taghmaoui as Omar
- Neal McDonough as FBI Special Agent Max Archer
- Jeff Daniels as Carter
- Archie Panjabi as Chandra Dawkin
- Mozhan Marnò as Leyla
- Lorena Gale as Dierdre Horn
- Alyy Khan as Fareed
- Raad Rawi as Nathir
- Adeel Akhtar as Hamzi
- Jonathan Lloyd Walker as MI6 Agent Hayes

== Production ==
The project had been in development since 2002 and was originally set to be produced by Walt Disney Pictures (through Touchstone Pictures), but was dropped owing to management change. It was picked up by Overture Films. Principal photography started in early September, 2007, in Toronto, Marseille, and Marrakesh.

== Reception ==
=== Critical response ===
On Rotten Tomatoes, the film holds an approval rating of 64% based on 169 reviews, with an average rating of 6.19/10. The website's critics consensus reads: "Despite another reliable performance from Don Cheadle, Traitor suffers from too many cliches and an unfocused narrative." Metacritic assigned the film a weighted average score of 61 out of 100, based on 29 critics, indicating "generally favorable reviews".

Roger Ebert of the Chicago Sun-Times gave the film three stars out of four and wrote in his review, "The movie proceeds quickly, seems to know its subject matter, is fascinating in its portrait of the inner politics and structure of the terrorist group, and comes uncomfortably close to reality. But what holds it together is the Cheadle character."

=== Box office ===
The film opened at #5 with $7.9 million from 2,054 in its opening weekend. It went on to gross $23.5 million in the United States, and $2.2 million in other markets, for a total $27.6 million worldwide.

== Related films ==
Anwar, a 2010 Indian Malayalam language film is inspired from Traitor.
