= The Rat Pack (film) =

1998 HBO TV movie directed by Rob Cohen

- DVD cover
- Genre: Drama
- Written by: Kario Salem
- Directed by: Rob Cohen
- Starring: Ray Liotta; Joe Mantegna; Don Cheadle; Angus Macfadyen; William L. Petersen; Željko Ivanek; Bobby Slayton; Dan O'Herlihy
- Music by: Mark Adler
- Country of origin: United States
- Original language: English

Production
- Executive producer: Neal H. Moritz
- Producer: Fred Caruso
- Cinematography: Shane Hurlbut
- Editor: Eric Sears
- Running time: 119 minutes
- Production companies: Original Film; HBO Pictures

Original release
- Network: HBO
- Release: August 22, 1998

The Rat Pack is a 1998 American drama television film about the Rat Pack. The film was directed by Rob Cohen, written by Kario Salem, and premiered on HBO on August 22, 1998. It stars Ray Liotta as Frank Sinatra, Joe Mantegna as Dean Martin, Don Cheadle as Sammy Davis Jr., and Angus Macfadyen as Peter Lawford. Despite his membership in the Pack, Joey Bishop (played by Bobby Slayton) is given minimal screen time, while John F. Kennedy (played by William L. Petersen), depicted as an on-and-off friend of Sinatra's, is given a more central role.

Also featured in supporting roles are Željko Ivanek as Bobby Kennedy, Veronica Cartwright as Rocky Cooper (wife of Gary Cooper), Deborah Kara Unger as Ava Gardner, Megan Dodds as May Britt, Dan O'Herlihy as Joseph Kennedy, Robert Miranda as Sam Giancana, John Diehl as Joe DiMaggio and Barbara Niven as Marilyn Monroe.

Cheadle won a Golden Globe for his performance as Sammy Davis Jr. The Rat Pack won three Emmy awards and earned several more nominations, including acting ones for Cheadle and Mantegna.

== Plot ==
The main icon Frank Sinatra discusses the film's main narrative beginning during high points in the solo careers of the Rat Pack: Dean Martin was doing well without the help of the Rat Pack posy Jerry Lewis; Sinatra's career never dwindled and was actually doing better than ever during this moment; Sammy Davis Jr., is recovering not only his career, but his health after a car crash in which he lost an eyeball, and standup comic Joey Bishop is attempting to get his foot in the door by doing opening comedy acts. The Pack merges into one whole unit with actor Peter Lawford, who has been ostracized since being caught in the public eye with Sinatra's ex-wife, Ava Gardner.

Lawford has married Patricia Kennedy. Abandoning a notion to seduce Pat for his own amusement, Sinatra becomes more interested in her brother John F. Kennedy's political goals. He sincerely believes Jack Kennedy would be a great president, but he also feels having a close connection in the White House could majorly benefit his own public image. Sinatra arranges for the entire Pack to perform at a JFK campaign fund-raiser. Sinatra also knows Kennedy's infatuation with the opposite sex and introduces him to Marilyn Monroe, who begins seeing Kennedy behind the back of her husband, baseball star Joe DiMaggio.

Kennedy's pompous father, Joseph P. Kennedy, feels Sinatra's mob ties might hurt Jack's chances of defeating Richard Nixon in the election. He insists that Sinatra help the campaign from behind the scenes only; hypocritically, he also asks Sinatra to use those same mob ties to pursue West Virginia unions' support Kennedy's way. They go on to combine their stage acts for joint performances. They even parlay their friendship into a movie collaboration, Ocean's 11, working and playing together at the same time.

Davis is sometimes secretly hurt by the racist jokes of their stage act, especially after his girlfriend, actress May Britt, insinuates that the rest of the Pack is laughing at him, not with him. Davis has a more serious brush with racism when he and Britt announce their engagement, which results in a mixed-marriage protest in front of Davis's hotel. Davis day-dreams about scaring the protesters away with a song and dance routine in which he wields a gun. But he concedes the possible political repercussions of an interracial marriage.

He postpones the wedding to avoid hurting Sinatra, who had agreed to serve as best man. In the White House, President Kennedy seeks to renew his friendship with Sinatra. The two go sailing and plan for Kennedy to stay at Sinatra's Palm Springs residence during an upcoming West Coast presidential trip. Thrilled by the idea, Sinatra returns home and arranges for a guest compound to be built for Kennedy and his entourage.

However, the FBI finds a potential mafia link to the White House through a woman, Judy Campbell, who shared phone calls, and possibly affairs, with both Kennedy and mob boss Sam "Momo" Giancana after being introduced by Sinatra to each. Kennedy's brother, attorney general Robert F. Kennedy, insists that the President cancel his stay at Sinatra's house and cut off all ties to the entertainer. This enrages Sinatra, who had sunk a lot of money and time into the renovation and had been at least partially responsible for Kennedy's being elected president.

Sinatra takes out his wrath on Lawford, who as Kennedy's brother-in-law was Sinatra's direct link to the White House. Lawford finds himself repeatedly serving as a messenger between Sinatra and the Kennedys, including JFK's secret dalliances with Monroe, and he is sick of it. Lawford dreads delivering the news of Kennedy's decision to cancel his visit to Sinatra's house and stay instead with Bing Crosby, a Republican. A furious Sinatra physically throws Lawford out of his home and vows never to forgive him. The movie depicts this incident as the beginning of the end of the Rat Pack's influence in both politics and entertainment.

== Cast ==
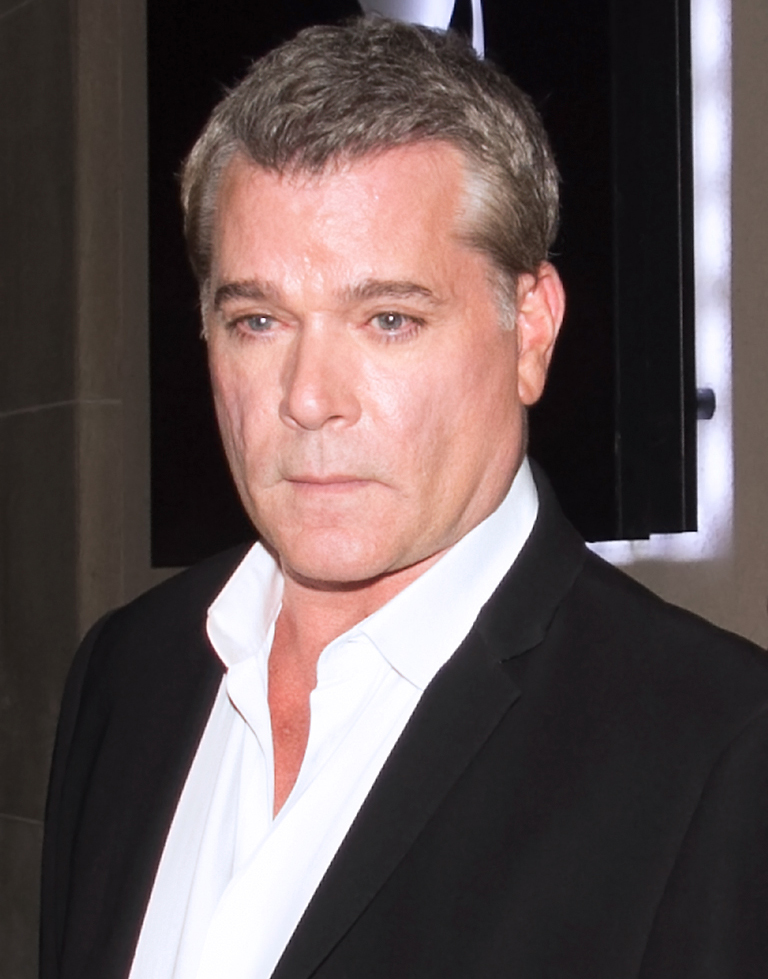
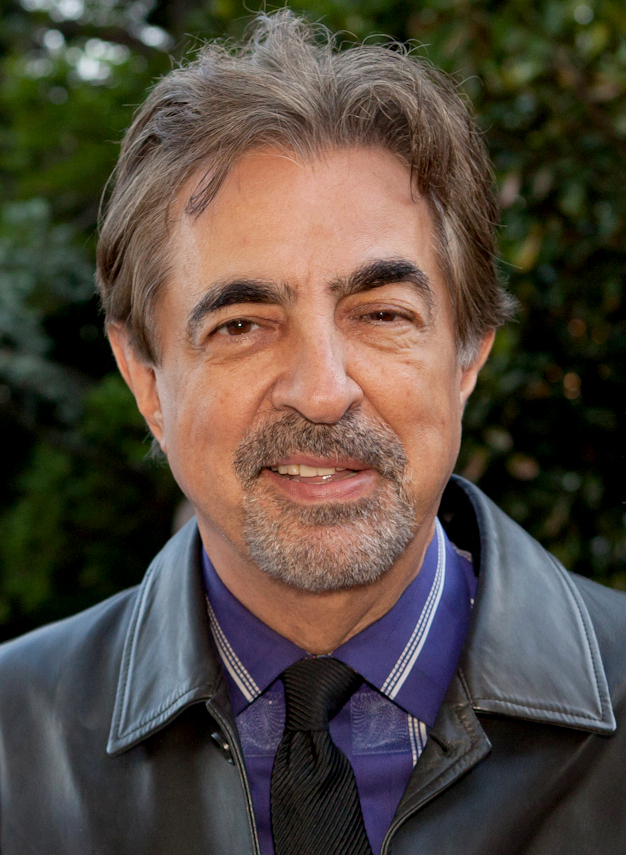
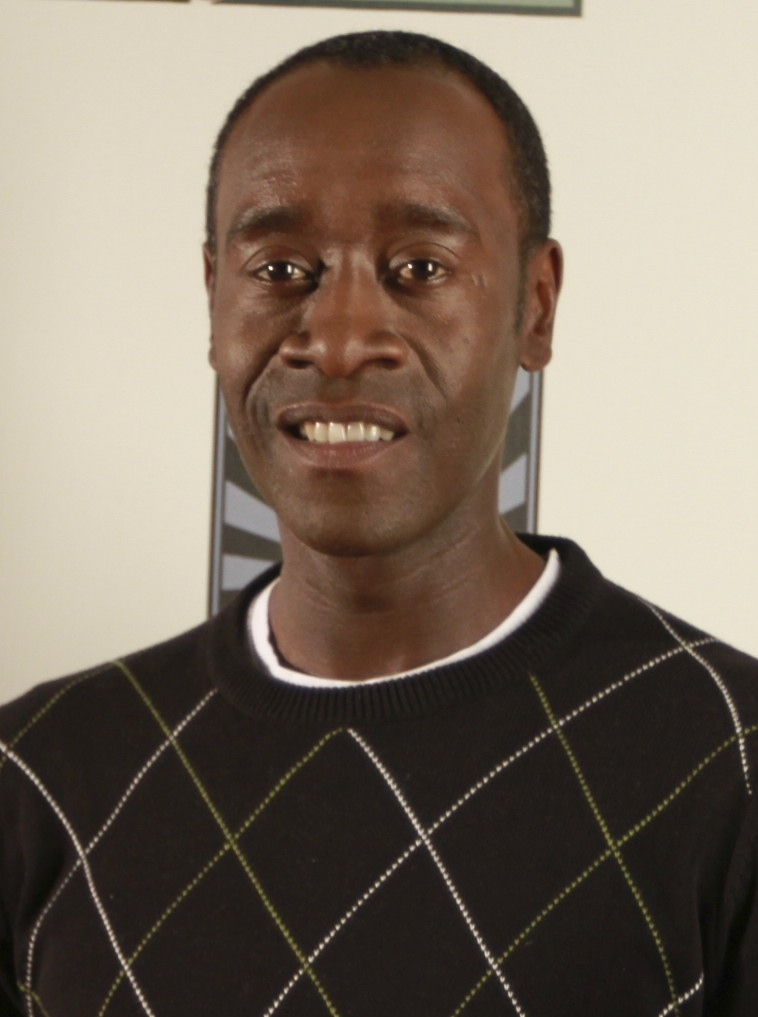
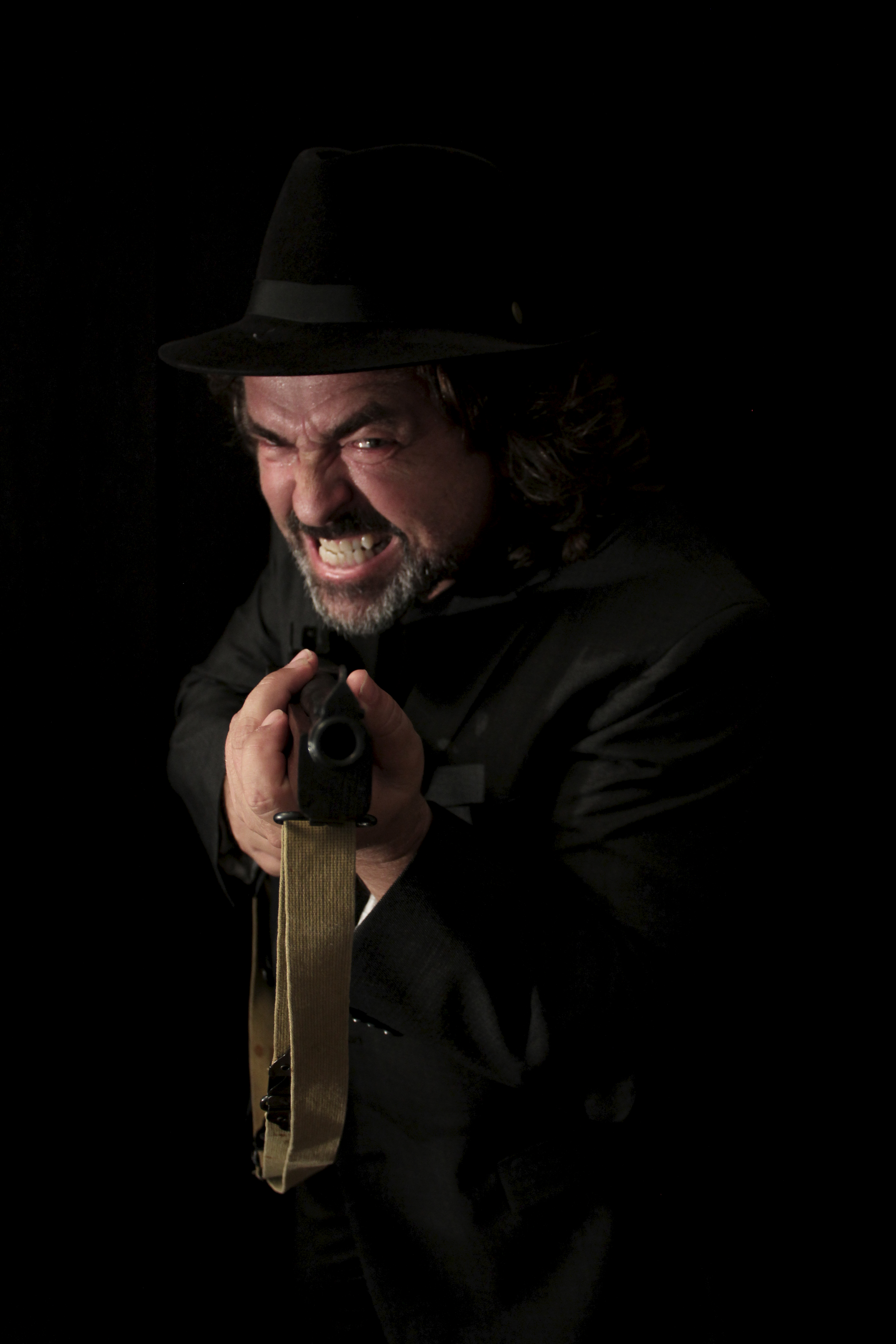
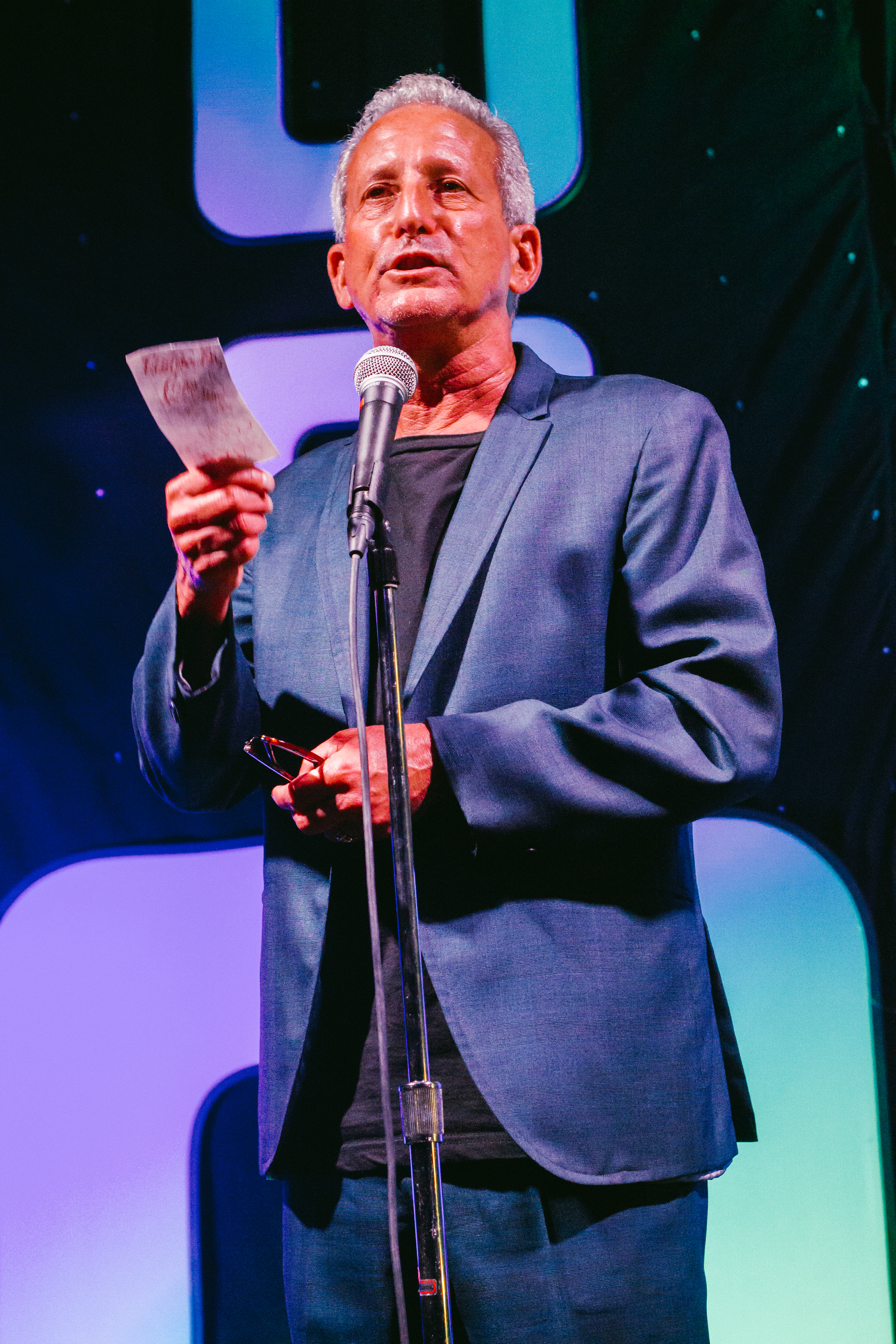
The main cast of The Rat Pack (from left to right) Ray Liotta (pictured in 2012) plays Frank Sinatra, Joe Mantegna (2014) plays Dean Martin, Don Cheadle (2011) plays Sammy Davis Jr., Angus Macfadyen (in a promo shot from the film Timeless in 2016) plays Peter Lawford, and Bobby Slayton (2014) plays Joey Bishop, respectively.
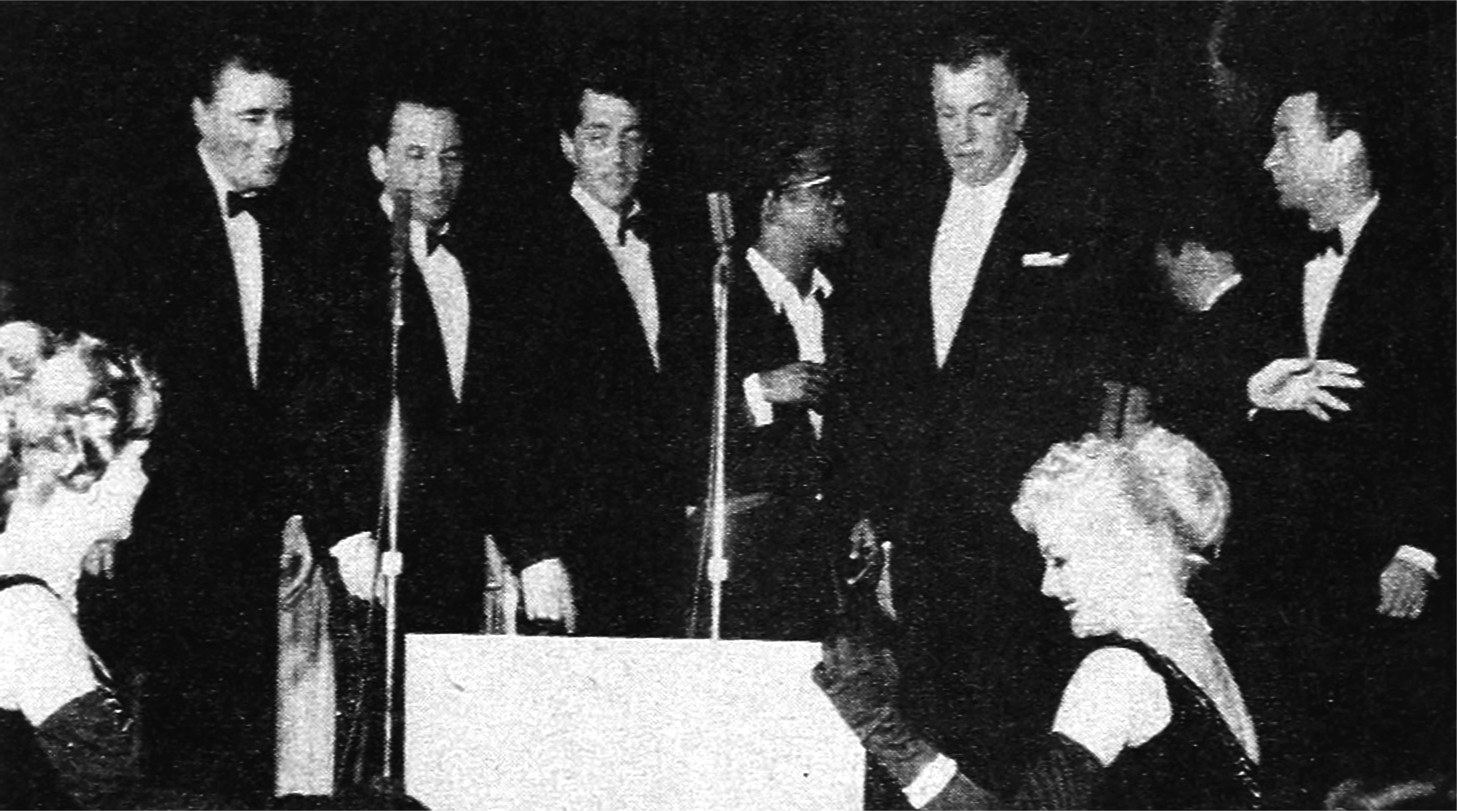
The Rat Pack performing at the Sands Hotel, Las Vegas, in 1960.
- Ray Liotta as Frank Sinatra
  - Michael Dees as his singing voice
- Joe Mantegna as Dean Martin
  - Warren Wiebe as his singing voice
- Don Cheadle as Sammy Davis Jr.
  - Gunnar Madsen as his singing voice
- Angus Macfadyen as Peter Lawford
- Bobby Slayton as Joey Bishop
- William L. Petersen as John F. Kennedy
- Željko Ivanek as Robert F. Kennedy
- Dan O'Herlihy as Joseph Kennedy
- Deborah Kara Unger as Ava Gardner
- John Diehl as Joe DiMaggio
- Megan Dodds as May Britt
- Veronica Cartwright as Rocky Cooper
- Barbara Niven as Marilyn Monroe
- Michelle Grace as Judy Campbell
- Craig Richard Nelson as Lewis Milestone
- Robert Miranda as Sam Giancana
- Joe Cortese as Johnny Roselli

== Reception ==
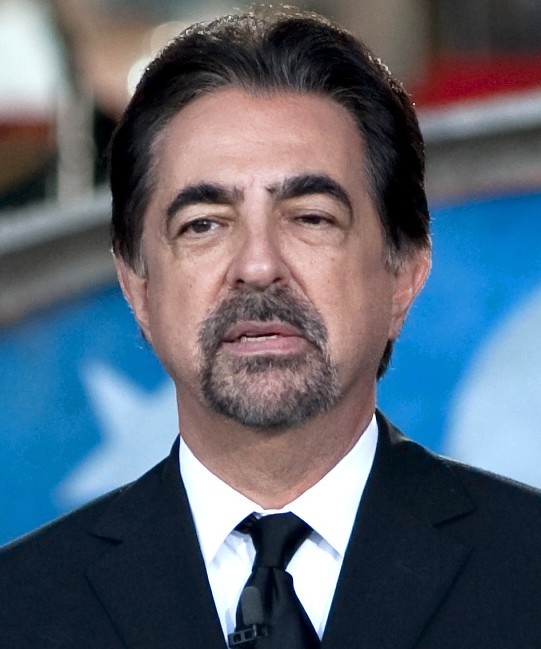
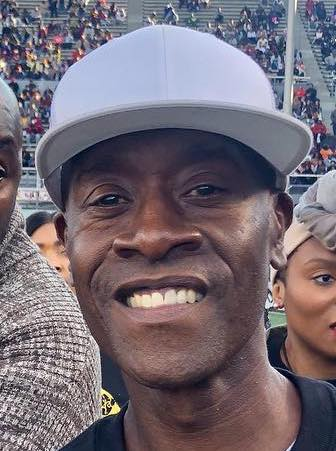
Joe Mantegna and Don Cheadle received critical acclaim for their performances. Both earned Golden Globe Award nominations for Best Supporting Actor in a Series, Miniseries or Television Film, with Cheadle winning in the category.

On Rotten Tomatoes, the film holds an approval rating of 57% based on 30 reviews, with an average rating of 6/10. The site's critics consensus reads: "While it evokes its time period with a keen sense of swagger, The Rat Pack is troubled by uneven lead performances and fairly routine biopic trappings."

== Awards and nominations ==
Year	Award	Category	Nominee(s)	Result	Ref.
1999	American Cinema Editors Awards	Best Edited Two-Hour Movie for Non-Commercial Television	Eric A. Sears	Nominated	
1999	American Society of Cinematographers Awards	Outstanding Achievement in Cinematography in Movie of the Week, Miniseries or Pilot	Shane Hurlbut	Nominated	
1999	Art Directors Guild Awards	Excellence in Production Design Award – Television Movie or Mini-Series	Hilda Stark and Kathleen M. McKernin	Nominated	
1999	Artios Awards	Best Casting for TV Movie of the Week	Nancy Foy	Won	
1999	Cinema Audio Society Awards	Outstanding Achievement in Sound Mixing for Television – Movie of the Week, Mini-Series or Specials	Felipe Borrero, Michael C. Casper, and Daniel J. Leahy	Nominated	
1999	Directors Guild of America Awards	Outstanding Directorial Achievement in Movies for Television or Miniseries	Rob Cohen	Nominated	
1999	Golden Globe Awards	Best Supporting Actor in a Series, Miniseries or Motion Picture Made for Television	Don Cheadle	Won (Note: Tied with Gregory Peck for Moby Dick.)	
1999	Golden Globe Awards	Best Supporting Actor in a Series, Miniseries or Motion Picture Made for Television	Joe Mantegna	Nominated	
1999	Golden Reel Awards	Best Sound Editing – Television Movies of the Week – Music	Joanie Diener	Won	
1999	NAACP Image Awards	Outstanding Actor in a Television Movie, Mini-Series or Dramatic Special	Don Cheadle	Nominated	
1999	Online Film & Television Association Awards	Best Motion Picture Made for Television		Nominated	
1999	Online Film & Television Association Awards	Best Actor in a Motion Picture or Miniseries	Joe Mantegna	Nominated	
1999	Online Film & Television Association Awards	Best Supporting Actor in a Motion Picture or Miniseries	Don Cheadle	Won	
1999	Online Film & Television Association Awards	Best Direction of a Motion Picture or Miniseries		Nominated	
1999	Online Film & Television Association Awards	Best Ensemble in a Motion Picture or Miniseries		Won	
1999	Online Film & Television Association Awards	Best Costume Design in a Motion Picture or Miniseries		Nominated	
1999	Online Film & Television Association Awards	Best Editing in a Motion Picture or Miniseries		Nominated	
1999	Online Film & Television Association Awards	Best Lighting in a Motion Picture or Miniseries		Nominated	
1999	Online Film & Television Association Awards	Best Music in a Motion Picture or Miniseries		Nominated	
1999	Online Film & Television Association Awards	Best Makeup/Hairstyling in a Motion Picture or Miniseries		Nominated	
1999	Online Film & Television Association Awards	Best New Theme Song in a Motion Picture or Miniseries		Nominated	
1999	Primetime Emmy Awards	Outstanding Made for Television Movie	Neal H. Mortiz and Fred C. Caruso	Nominated	
1999	Primetime Emmy Awards	Outstanding Supporting Actor in a Miniseries or a Movie	Don Cheadle	Nominated	
1999	Primetime Emmy Awards	Outstanding Supporting Actor in a Miniseries or a Movie	Joe Mantegna	Nominated	
1999	Primetime Emmy Awards	Outstanding Writing for a Miniseries or a Movie	Kario Salem	Nominated	
1999	Primetime Emmy Awards	Outstanding Art Direction for a Miniseries or a Movie	Hilda Stark, Kathleen M. McKernin, and Linda Spheeris	Won	
1999	Primetime Emmy Awards	Outstanding Casting for a Miniseries or a Made for Television Movie	Nancy Foy	Nominated	
1999	Primetime Emmy Awards	Outstanding Hairstyling for a Miniseries, Movie or a Special	Audrey Futterman-Stern, Gail Rowell-Ryan, and Kelvin R. Trahan	Nominated	
1999	Primetime Emmy Awards	Outstanding Makeup for a Miniseries, Movie or a Special	Kandace Westmore, Judy Lovell, Marvin Westmore, and Kevin Haney	Nominated	
1999	Primetime Emmy Awards	Outstanding Music Direction	Mark Adler	Won	
1999	Primetime Emmy Awards	Outstanding Single-Camera Picture Editing for a Miniseries or a Movie	Eric A. Sears	Nominated	
1999	Primetime Emmy Awards	Outstanding Sound Mixing for a Miniseries or a Movie	Felipe Borrero, Michael C. Casper, and Daniel J. Leahy	Won	
1999	Screen Actors Guild Awards	Outstanding Performance by a Male Actor in a Miniseries or Television Movie	Ray Liotta	Nominated	

== See also ==
- Sinatra (miniseries), another biopic, stars Philip Casnoff as Frank Sinatra, with Olympia Dukakis, Joe Santos, Gina Gershon, Marcia Gay Harden, Rod Steiger, and James F. Kelly as John F. Kennedy. David Raynr, Danny Gans, Joris Stuyck, and Shelly Lipkin also make appearances as Sammy Davis Jr., Dean Martin, Peter Lawford, and Joey Bishop respectively. It aired on the CBS television network on November 8, 1992.
- Martin and Lewis, a 2002 made-for-television film about Dean Martin's partnership with Jerry Lewis, focusing on their formation as a comedy team in the 1940s, to their eventual break-up in the 1950s (in which The Rat Pack film mentions from a news title in the opening, to a scene where a guy smugly says to Dean in a casino "Miss Jerry?" To which Martin jokingly replies "That question's so old it's biblical, pal").
- Cultural depictions of John F. Kennedy
- Robert F. Kennedy in media
