= Enough Project =

U.S. nonprofit organization

- Founded: 2007
- Founder: Gayle Smith and John Prendergast
- Type: Non-profit organization
- Purpose: Human Rights, Civilian Protection, and Peace
- Location: 1420 K St. NW, 2nd Floor Washington, DC 20005, U.S.
- Method: Analysis, Advocacy and Activism
- Website: enoughproject.org

The Enough Project is a Washington, D.C.–based non-profit organization that was founded in 2007. Its stated mission is to end genocide and crimes against humanity. The Enough Project conducts research in several conflict areas in Africa including Sudan, South Sudan, the Democratic Republic of the Congo, the Central African Republic, and the areas controlled by the Lord's Resistance Army (LRA). The Enough Project seeks to build leverage against the perpetrators and facilitators of atrocities and corruption through conducting research, engaging with governments and the private sector on policy solutions, and mobilizing public campaigns.

== History ==
The Enough Project grew out of the research and advocacy strategies of the Center for American Progress and the International Crisis Group in 2007. Its co-founders were John Prendergast, the current executive director, and Gayle Smith, who is no longer employed there. Both co-founders had already served as advisors on Africa to the National Security Council during the Clinton administration. In its early years, the Enough Project focused on support for enhanced peace processes, civilian protection strategies, and accountability efforts for deadly conflicts and mass atrocities in East and Central Africa. In 2016, the Enough Project shifted its focus to the political economy of conflict and combating violent kleptocratic regimes. In that same year, the Enough Project launched The Sentry, an initiative designed to gather evidence and analyze the financing and operation of African conflicts. The Enough Project also changed its nonprofit financial sponsor, moving from the previous Center of American Progress (CAP) to the New Venture Fund (NVF).

== Campaigns and issues ==
Campaigns and initiatives aiming to draw attention to these crises include The Sentry and, previously, Raise Hope for Congo and the Satellite Sentinel Project. The project was supportive of the conflict mineral disclosure law incorporated within the Dodd–Frank Wall Street Reform and Consumer Protection Act of 2010, but there was some criticism of its suggestion that compliance would only add $0.01 to the cost of a cell phone.

The Enough Project was investigated in 2021 by the Counter Network Division, a division of the National Targeting Center, itself a component of U.S. Customs and Border Protection, which also investigated journalists Ali Watkins and Martha Mendoza, among others. The investigations included screening through terrorism watchlists.
