= Helen Hunt filmography =

Performances by American actress

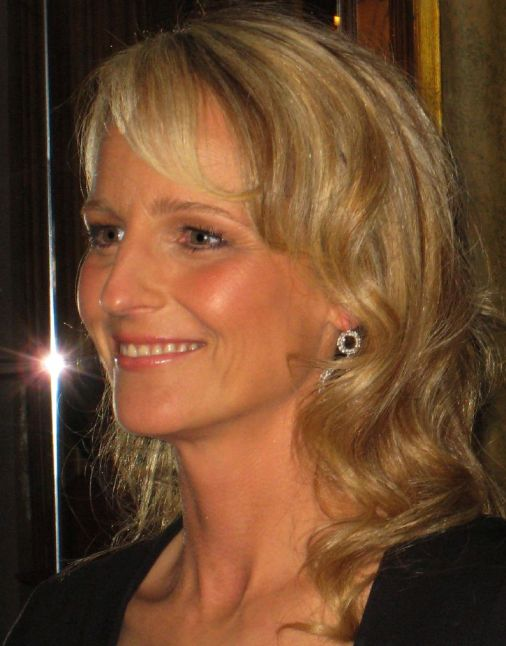
Hunt in 2007

The following is the filmography and stage work of Academy Award winning actress and director Helen Hunt.

== Filmography ==
=== Film ===
Year	Title	Role	Notes
1977	Rollercoaster	Tracy Calder	
1977	The Spell	Kristina Matchett	
1984	Trancers	Leena	
1985	Waiting to Act	Tracy	Short film
1985	Girls Just Want to Have Fun	Lynne Stone	
1986	The Frog Prince	Princess Henrietta	
1986	Peggy Sue Got Married	Beth Bodell	
1987	Project X	Teri MacDonald	
1987	The Nativity	Mary	Voice role
1988	Stealing Home	Hope Wyatt	
1988	Miles from Home	Jennifer	
1989	Next of Kin	Jessie Gates	
1991	Trancers II	Lena Deth	
1992	The Waterdance	Anna	
1992	Only You	Clare Enfield	
1992	Bob Roberts	Rose Pondell	
1992	Mr. Saturday Night	Annie Wells	
1992	Trancers III	Lena Deth	
1993	Sexual Healing	Rene	Short film
1995	Kiss of Death	Bev Kilmartin	
1996	Twister	Dr. Jo Harding	
1997	As Good as It Gets	Carol Connelly	
2000	Dr. T & the Women	Bree Davis	
2000	Pay It Forward	Arlene McKinney	
2000	Cast Away	Kelly Frears	
2000	What Women Want	Darcy McGuire	
2001	One Night at McCool's	Truck driver	Scenes deleted
2001	The Curse of the Jade Scorpion	Betty Ann Fitzgerald	
2004	A Good Woman	Mrs. Erlynne	
2006	Bobby	Samantha Stevens	
2007	Then She Found Me	April Epner	Also co-screenwriter, producer and director
2010	Every Day	Jeannie Freed	
2011	Soul Surfer	Cheri Hamilton	
2011	Jock the Hero Dog	Jess	Voice role
2012	The Sessions	Cheryl Cohen-Greene	
2013	Decoding Annie Parker	Dr. Mary-Claire King	
2014	Ride	Jackie Durning	Also writer, director, and producer
2017	I Love You, Daddy	Aura Topher	
2018	The Miracle Season	Kathy Bresnahan	
2018	Candy Jar	Kathy	
2019	I See You	Jackie Harper	
2020	The Night Clerk	Ethel Bromley	
2021	How It Ends	Lucinda	
2025	In Cold Light	Claire	
TBA	Tower Stories		Post-production

=== Television ===
Year	Title	Role	Notes
1973	Pioneer Woman	Sarah Sargeant	Movie
1974–1975	Amy Prentiss	Jill Prentiss	Main role; 3 episodes
1975	Death Scream	Teila Rodriguez	Movie
1975–1976	The Swiss Family Robinson	Helga Wagner	Main role; 20 episodes
1975	All Together Now	Susan Lindsay	Movie
1976	Ark II	Diana	Episode: "Omega"
1976	Having Babies	Sharon McNamara	Movie
1977	The Spell	Kristina Matchett	Movie
1977	The Fitzpatricks	Kerry Gerardi	Main role; 9 episodes
1977	The Mary Tyler Moore Show	Laurie Slaughter	Episode: "Murray Ghosts for Ted"
1978	The Bionic Woman	Princess Aura	Episode: "Sanctuary Earth"
1979	Transplant	Janice Hurley	Movie
1980	The Facts of Life	Emily	Episode: "Dope"
1980, 1981	Knots Landing	Betsy, Brenda	Episodes: "Hitchhike" (Part 2), "Step One"
1981	CBS Afternoon Playhouse	Phoebe	Episode: "I Think I'm Having a Baby"
1981	Child Bride of Short Creek	Naomi	Movie
1981	Darkroom	Nancy Lawrence	Episode: "The Bogeyman Will Get You"
1981	Angel Dusted	Lizzie Eaton	Movie
1981	The Miracle of Kathy Miller	Kathy Miller	Movie
1982	Desperate Lives	Sandy Cameron	Movie
1982	Gimme a Break!	Valerie	Episode: "An Unmarried Couple"
1982–1983	It Takes Two	Lisa Quinn	Main role; 22 episodes
1983	Bill: On His Own	Jenny Wells	Movie
1983	Quarterback Princess	Tami Maida	Movie
1983	Choices of the Heart	Cathy	Movie
1984	Sweet Revenge	Debbie Markham	Movie
1985	Highway to Heaven	Lizzy MacGill	Episode: "Thoroughbreds" (Parts 1 & 2)
1984–1986	St. Elsewhere	Clancy Williams	Recurring role; 8 episodes
1988	Shooter	Tracey	Movie
1989	Incident at Dark River	Jesse McCandless	Movie
1990	China Beach	Amanda 'Sissy' Simpson	Episode: "The Thanks of a Grateful Nation"
1991	My Life and Times	Rebecca Miller	Main role; 6 episodes
1991	Murder in New Hampshire: The Pamela Wojas Smart Story	Pamela Smart	Movie
1991	Into the Badlands	Blossom	Movie
1992–1999; 2019	Mad About You	Jamie Stemple Buchman	Main role; 162 episodes
1993	In the Company of Darkness	Gina Pulasky	Movie
1994, 1997	Saturday Night Live	Herself (host)	2 episodes
1995	Friends	Jamie Buchman	Episode: "The One with Two Parts: Part 1";
1998	The Simpsons	Renee (voice)	Episode: "Dumbbell Indemnity"
1998	Twelfth Night	Viola	Movie
2005	Empire Falls	Janine Roby	Miniseries
2017	Shots Fired	Governor Patricia Eamons	Main role
2019	World on Fire	Nancy Campbell	Main role; 7 episodes
2021–2023	Blindspotting	Rainey	Recurring role; 12 episodes
2024–2025	Hacks	Winnie Landell	Recurring role; 8 episodes

=== Director ===
Year	Title	Notes
1998, 1999, 2019	Mad About You	Episodes: "Cheating on Sheila", "Mother's Day", "Farmer Buchman", "The Final Frontier" (Parts 1 & 2), "The Kid Leaves"
2007	Then She Found Me	
2012	Californication	Episode: "At the Movies"
2013, 2015	Revenge	Episodes: "Retribution", "Loss"
2014	Ride	
2016	Life in Pieces	Episode: "Window Vanity Dress Grace"
2016	House of Lies	Episode: "Violent Agreement"
2016	This Is Us	Episode: "Last Christmas"
2017	Feud: Bette and Joan	Episode: "Abandoned!"
2018	American Housewife	Episodes: "Selling Out", "The Inheritance"
2018	Splitting Up Together	Episode: "Soups Jealous"
2019	The Politician	Episode: “Gone Girl”

== Stage ==
Year	Title	Role	Notes	Ref.
1989	Our Town	Emily Webb	Lincoln Center Theater	
1990	The Taming of the Shrew	Bianca Minola	New York Shakespeare Festival Public Theater	
1998	Twelfth Night	Viola	Lincoln Center Theater	
2003	Life x 3	Sonia	Circle in the Square Theatre	
2010	Our Town	Stage Manager	Barrow Street Theatre	
2010	Much Ado About Nothing	Beatrice	Shakespeare Center of Los Angeles	
2012	Our Town	Stage Manager	Santa Monica College Performing Arts Center	
2019	Working	Angie White	Encores! at City Center	
2022	Eureka Day	Suzanne	The Old Vic	
2025	Betrayal	Emma	Goodman Theatre	
2026	The Cherry Orchard	Madame Ranyevskaya	Royal Shakespeare Company	
