= List of awards and nominations received by Helen Hunt =

Helen Hunt awards and nominations
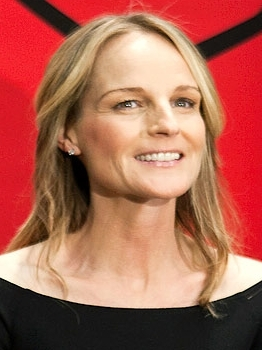
- Hunt in 2011
Awards and nominations
Major Awards	Wins	Nominations
Academy Awards	1	2
BAFTA Awards	0	1
Critics' Choice Awards	0	2
Primetime Emmy Awards	4	7
Golden Globe Awards	4	8
Screen Actors Guild Awards	2	11
Wins	15
Nominations	31

The following is the list of awards and nominations received by Helen Hunt throughout her career.

She is best known for her role as Jamie Buchman in the NBC sitcom Mad About You (1992–1999) for which she earned four Primetime Emmy Awards for Outstanding Lead Actress in a Comedy Series, three Golden Globe Awards for Best Actress – Television Series Musical or Comedy, and a Screen Actors Guild Award for Outstanding Female Actor in a Comedy Series. She also starred as Carol Connelly, a struggling mother and waitress in the romantic comedy film As Good as It Gets (1997) for which she won the Academy Award for Best Actress, the Golden Globe Award for Best Actress in a Motion Picture – Musical or Comedy, and the Screen Actors Guild Award for Outstanding Female Actor in a Leading Role.

== Major associations ==
=== Academy Awards ===
Year	Category	Nominated work	Result	Ref.
1998	Best Actress	As Good as It Gets	Won	
2013	Best Supporting Actress	The Sessions	Nominated	

=== BAFTA Awards ===
British Academy Film Awards
Year	Category	Nominated work	Result	Ref.
2013	Best Actress in a Supporting Role	The Sessions	Nominated	

=== Emmy Awards ===
Primetime Emmy Awards
Year	Category	Nominated work	Result	Ref.
1993	Outstanding Lead Actress in a Comedy Series	Mad About You (episode: "Pilot")	Nominated	
1994	Outstanding Lead Actress in a Comedy Series	Mad About You (episode: "Cold Feet")	Nominated	
1995	Outstanding Lead Actress in a Comedy Series	Mad About You (episode: "The Ride Home")	Nominated	
1996	Outstanding Lead Actress in a Comedy Series	Mad About You (episode: "The Finale")	Won	
1997	Outstanding Lead Actress in a Comedy Series	Mad About You (episode: "The Birth")	Won	
1998	Outstanding Lead Actress in a Comedy Series	Mad About You (episode: "Moody Blues")	Won	
1999	Outstanding Lead Actress in a Comedy Series	Mad About You (episode: "The Final Frontier")	Won	

=== Golden Globe Awards ===
Year	Category	Nominated work	Result	Ref.
1993	Best Actress in a Television Series – Musical or Comedy	Mad About You (Season 1)	Nominated	
1994	Best Actress in a Television Series – Musical or Comedy	Mad About You (Season 2)	Won	
1995	Best Actress in a Television Series – Musical or Comedy	Mad About You (Season 3)	Won	
1996	Best Actress in a Television Series – Musical or Comedy	Mad About You (Season 4)	Nominated	
1997	Best Actress in a Television Series – Musical or Comedy	Mad About You (Season 5)	Won	
1998	Best Actress in a Television Series – Musical or Comedy	Mad About You (Season 6)	Nominated	
1998	Best Actress in a Motion Picture – Musical or Comedy	As Good as It Gets	Won	
2013	Best Supporting Actress – Motion Picture	The Sessions	Nominated	

=== Screen Actors Guild Awards ===
Year	Category	Nominated work	Result	Ref.
1995	Outstanding Ensemble in a Comedy Series	Mad About You	Nominated	
1995	Outstanding Female Actor in a Comedy Series	Mad About You	Won	
1996	Outstanding Female Actor in a Comedy Series	Mad About You	Nominated	
1996	Outstanding Ensemble in a Comedy Series	Mad About You	Nominated	
1997	Outstanding Ensemble in a Comedy Series	Mad About You	Nominated	
1997	Outstanding Female Actor in a Comedy Series	Mad About You	Nominated	
1998	Outstanding Female Actor in a Comedy Series	Mad About You	Nominated	
1998	Outstanding Ensemble in a Comedy Series	Mad About You	Nominated	
1998	Outstanding Female Actor in a Leading Role	As Good as It Gets	Won	
2007	Outstanding Ensemble in a Motion Picture	Bobby	Nominated	
2013	Outstanding Female Actor in a Supporting Role	The Sessions	Nominated	

== Miscellaneous awards ==
=== American Comedy Awards ===
Year	Category	Nominated work	Result	Ref.
1994	Funniest Female Performer in a TV Series (Leading Role) – Network, Cable or Syndication	Mad About You	Won	
1995	Funniest Female Performer in a TV Series (Leading Role) – Network, Cable or Syndication	Mad About You	Won	
1996	Funniest Female Performer in a TV Series (Leading Role) – Network, Cable or Syndication	Mad About You	Won	
1998	Funniest Actress in a Motion Picture (Leading Role)	As Good as It Gets	Won	
1998	Funniest Female Performer in a TV Series (Leading Role) – Network, Cable or Syndication	Mad About You	Nominated	
1999	Funniest Female Performer in a TV Series (Leading Role) – Network, Cable or Syndication	Mad About You	Nominated	

=== Critics' Choice Awards ===
Year	Category	Nominated work	Result	Ref.
2007	Best Cast	Bobby	Nominated	
2013	Best Supporting Actress	The Sessions	Nominated	

=== Hollywood Film Awards ===
Year	Category	Nominated work	Result	Ref.
2006	Hollywood Ensemble Award	Bobby	Won	

=== Independent Spirit Awards ===
Year	Category	Nominated work	Result	Ref.
2013	Best Supporting Female	The Sessions	Won	

=== MTV Movie and TV Awards ===
Year	Category	Nominated work	Result	Ref.
1997	Best Performance in a Movie	Twister	Nominated	
1998	Best Performance in a Movie	As Good as It Gets	Nominated	
2001	Best Kiss in a Movie (Note: (shared with Tom Hanks))	Cast Away	Nominated	

=== People's Choice Awards ===
Year	Category	Nominated work	Result	Ref.
1996	Favorite Female TV Performer		Nominated	
1997	Favorite Female TV Performer		Nominated	
1998	Favorite Female TV Performer		Nominated	
1999	Favorite Female TV Performer		Won	

=== Satellite Awards ===
Year	Category	Nominated work	Result	Ref.
1997	Best Actress in a Television Series, Comedy or Musical	Mad About You	Nominated	
1998	Best Actress in a Motion Picture, Comedy or Musical	As Good as It Gets	Won	
1998	Best Actress in a Television Series, Comedy or Musical	Mad About You	Nominated	
1999	Best Actress in a Television Series, Comedy or Musical	Mad About You	Nominated	
2013	Best Supporting Actress in a Motion Picture, Drama	The Sessions	Nominated	

=== Saturn Awards ===
Year	Category	Nominated work	Result	Ref.
1997	Best Actress	Twister	Nominated	
