= The Conversation (Mad About You) =

- Mad About You episode
- Episode no.: Season 6 Episode 9
- Directed by: Gordon Hunt
- Written by: Victor Levin
- Cinematography by: Bobby Byrne
- Editing by: Sheila Amos
- Production code: 609
- Original air date: December 16, 1997
- Running time: 22 minutes

Episode chronology
← Previous "The New Friend"	Next → "Breastfeeding"

"The Conversation" is the ninth episode of the sixth season of the American sitcom Mad About You, written by executive producer Victor Levin and directed by Gordon Hunt. The episode originally aired on December 16, 1997, on NBC. The plot sees married couple Paul (Paul Reiser) and Jamie Buchman (Helen Hunt) have a 20-minute conversation as they allow their infant daughter Mabel to cry herself to sleep for the first time.

"The Conversation" is a bottle episode filmed in one take with a single camera. Playing out in real time, it takes place almost entirely outside the Buchman's bedroom. Originally, the episode was broadcast uninterrupted by commercials, which only aired after the opening theme and just before the end credits. Ferberization inspired Levin to write the episode as he believed it had "strong emotional ground". He also wanted an episode that would showcase Reiser and Hunt, who had always wanted to try the bottle episode format.

The episode was seen by 17.9 million viewers, giving the show its largest audience since the sixth-season premiere. It received a mixed reaction following its broadcast, with critics praising Reiser and Hunt's performances, and the honest and funny script. However, one critic called it the "most annoying Mad About You episode ever". In later years, it has been named one of television's best bottle episodes.

== Plot ==
Jamie (Helen Hunt) and Paul Buchman (Paul Reiser) put their infant daughter Mabel to bed, and wait outside her bedroom door to see if she will go to sleep on her own. Jamie sets a timer for intervals that allow them to check on Mabel, but they can only comfort her verbally. Paul is unhappy with the method, as he wants to go in and hold Mabel, but Jamie insists that it will be good for her and stops him from going into the room early. As they wait outside the door, Paul and Jamie talk about various topics, including Jamie winning 500 pounds of rigatoni, Paul's concern that he is shrinking, and his sudden realization that they have a cabinet by the room. When Jamie discovers their dog Murray is in the bedroom, Paul has to crawl in and get Murray out. Paul picks up a magazine featuring a sales listing for a house, and he admits that he wants to move to the suburbs.

Paul and Jamie argue over city and suburban living, leading Jamie to remark that they are completely incompatible as parents, as they disagree on almost everything. Jamie feels sick, and Paul helps her to realize that her gut instinct is telling her to pick up Mabel. However, just before they go in, they hear that Mabel has finally fallen asleep. Jamie tells Paul that they have broken Mabel's heart because she knows that they will not always be there for her. Paul stops Jamie from going into the room, as he worries that they will wake her. Jamie then tells him to turn back the clock, and they remain outside the door. Later, they watch a film together, and Paul points out a scene is all one-shot, but Jamie is not impressed.

== Production ==
=== Conception and writing ===
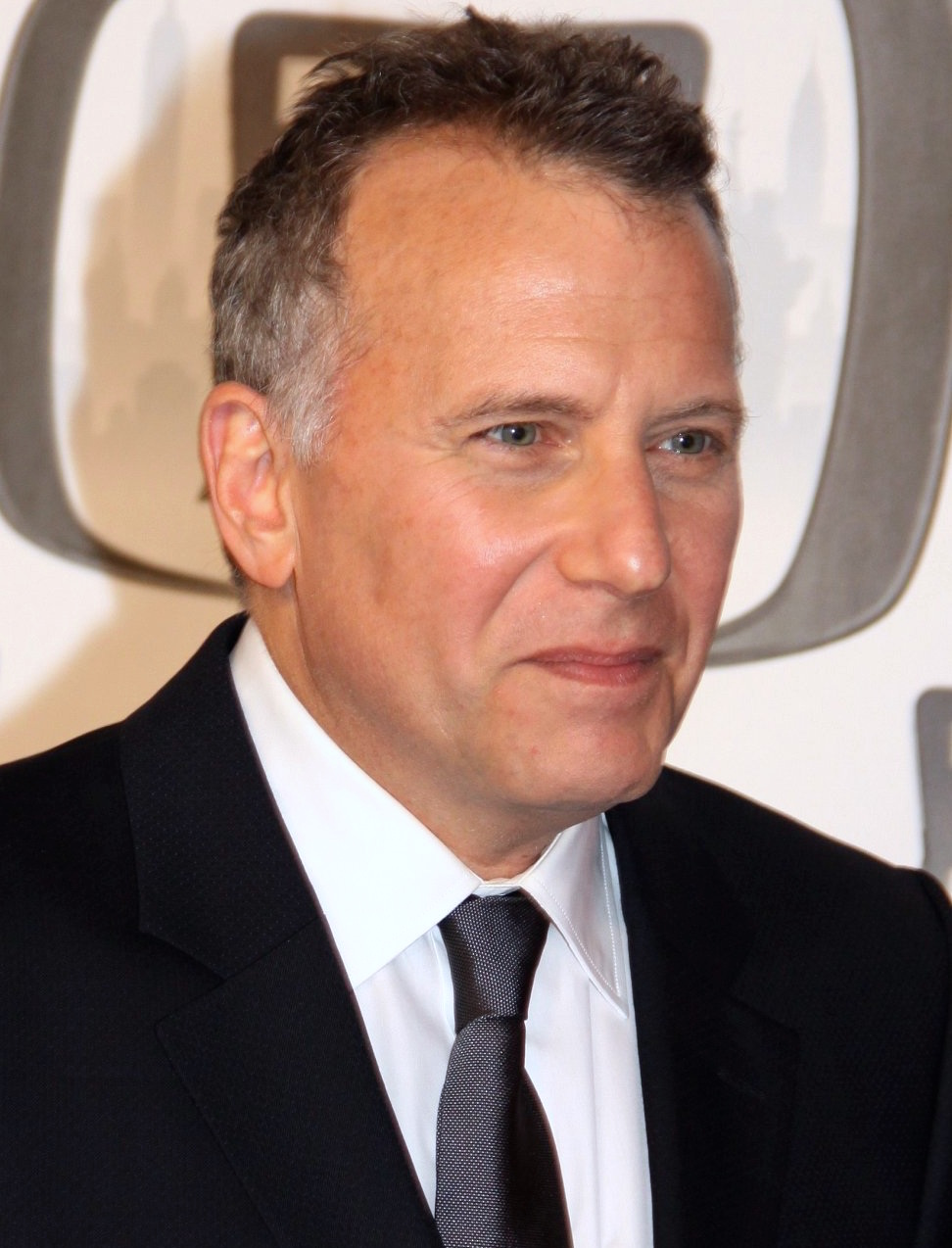
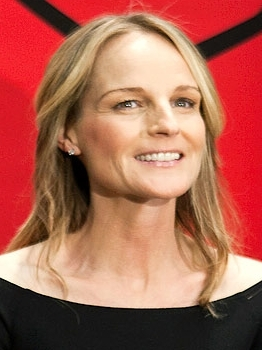
Paul Reiser (left) and Helen Hunt (right) are the only cast members featured in the episode.

The sitcom's executive producer Victor Levin wrote the script, believing that an episode focusing on Ferberization, a technique that allows a child to cry itself to sleep, would have "strong emotional ground". Levin spoke with the writing staff and the actors about his idea of Paul and Jamie being unable to leave the doorway to their bedroom as they listen to their daughter's cries. He explained to Nancy McAlister of The Florida Times Union: "What would be the surprises that would be unearthed if two people sat down just to talk since they've had a kid? Maybe they've been so busy they haven't had time to have a substantive talk. What do you think would come out?" Levin felt the plot would showcase Paul Reiser and Helen Hunt's talents, also hoping that the episode would resonate with parents and elicit empathy from the rest of the audience, saying, "I hope that they feel that it's real and honest and funny."

Reiser told The Record's Virginia Rohan that all parents go through a version of Ferberization at some point. As the episode plays out, Paul and Jamie come to realize they have very different parenting styles. They argue and converse, which brings up "surprising revelations", including Paul's views on where they raise their daughter. Reiser said that the bottle episode format was something the show's personnel had always wanted to try, following a season one episode set in the bathroom. He commented, "if the story is compelling enough, you could put an entire episode in an elevator". However, they were unable to find such a story until the sixth season. Levin said that Mad About You had plans for an experimental episode before medical drama ER aired its live episode that same year. He told McAlister that the format was the right way for the story to be told and that it was not a stunt.

=== Filming and broadcast ===
Hunt's father Gordon Hunt directed "The Conversation". To prepare for filming, the cast and crew had to know the exact length of the script, so they would not run over the time or run too short. Levin told McAlister that the script was "accurately timed out", so they knew how long the lines took to say. Rehearsals did not differ from regular episodes, but there were two "practice runs" during the afternoon of the shoot. The episode was filmed with a single camera in one take, so it plays out in real time. Reiser confirmed the episode took 25 minutes to film compared with the usual three hours.

The episode was filmed twice, with and without a studio audience. The take with the audience was the version that was broadcast. Levin confirmed the audience had a positive reaction to the script and jokes saying, "I think they felt they were part of something unusual." At one point, Paul and Jamie realize their dog Murray is in the bedroom with Mabel, and Paul has to crawl in to get Murray out. The dog's timing surprised Reiser and he was appreciative that the scene went well, saying "we were working on our lines, and he was working on his little belly crawl".

"The Conversation" was originally broadcast without interruption from commercials, which were aired at the beginning after the theme song and just before the credits. Levin expressed his gratitude to the NBC network for helping with the process. He also revealed the lack of commercials impacted the writing. Despite being one scene, he made sure that the episode had a beginning, middle and end. He told McAlister that he wanted it to be "as impactful and big feeling" as any show with multiple scenes. In the episode's tag, Paul and Jamie watch a film in a similar style as the episode, and Jamie expresses her dislike of the one-take approach.

== Reception ==
=== Ratings ===
For its original broadcast, "The Conversation" finished 12th in the ratings for the week of December 15–21, 1997. It was seen by 17.94 million viewers according to Nielsen Media Research, giving Mad About You its largest audience since the sixth-season premiere in September. It was the seventh most-watched show on NBC that week, behind episodes of ER, Seinfeld, Veronica's Closet, Friends, Union Square and Frasier.

=== Critical response ===
Writing for The Akron Beacon Journal, James Endrst thought "The Conversation" was "in its own quiet way, a greater success" compared to the live ER episode. Endrst praised Reiser and Hunt for their "touching and, under the TV circumstances, nearly flawless performances", and the script for creating distinctive and honest moments. He concluded it was not a groundbreaking episode, but "special". Walt Belcher of The Tampa Tribune said Mad About You succeeded with the one-take format, because it did not "overpower" the plot or performances, unlike experimental episodes of ER and Chicago Hope.

David Bianculli of the New York Daily News was impressed that the episode was filmed in one take and that Gordon Hunt directed it "without a false note". Bianculli felt despite its "strong" script, the episode would "sink, rather than soar" if it was not for Paul Reiser and Helen Hunt. He also joked that the episode featured more non-stop crying since the broadcast of the telemovie The Women's Room. In his review, The Capital's John Martin described the episode as "inspired". He wrote, "funny and heartwarming, it touches the uncertainties all good parents face". Martin also attributed "outstanding performances" by Reiser and Hunt for making the episode so memorable.

In contrast, The Baltimore Sun's David Zurawik found that 22 minutes of a crying baby was "way too much", and he believed that "The Conversation" was a good example of how "baby-obsessed" the sitcom had become. Zurawik also reported that USA Today gave the episode a thumbs-down saying that Mabel was the "most ill-conceived television baby since Murphy Brown's controversial Avery." Mike Duffy of the Detroit Free Press branded "The Conversation" the "most annoying Mad About You episode ever". He added commercials would have been a welcome interruption.

A reporter for The Desert Sun had a mixed reaction, saying it was "a sweet episode that's a little slack in the middle, but ends quite poignantly". Diane Shipley from the British newspaper The Guardian thought the plot was "ill-conceived", but the filming format "was an impressive acting achievement, but one that replicated the noise and tedium of early parenthood far too effectively".

=== Impact and legacy ===
In 2013, Jennifer Wood of Mental Floss included "The Conversation" in her feature on the "10 Best Bottle Episodes of Your Favorite TV Shows". Wood wrote "director Gordon Hunt channeled his inner Ingmar Bergman to do the unthinkable: drop a camera on the floor of the Buchmans' apartment and leave it there. For the entire show. Whether the actors were in the shot or not." She called it "pretty revolutionary stuff" and said the tag was "a clever nod" to the format. Kaitlynn Smith of TV Fanatic included the episode in her feature on "Amazing Bottle Episodes", calling it "one of the most challenging and well-executed" of the format.

Vulture's Daniel Kurland named "The Conversation" as "one of the boldest bottle episodes ever". He found the idea to be ambitious and thought the subject would resonate with parents going through the same thing with their children. He also said it was "a showcase of Paul and Jamie as unconfident new parents, and it encapsulates this beautifully." Kurland acknowledged that it was an unpopular episode with some viewers, but wrote "it might not be a perfect experiment, but it's a sort of brilliant, evolving idea".

Actress Natalie Morales chose "The Conversation" as her most influential television episode in a feature for Decider. Morales explained that on her first viewing, she could not to look away as she realized that it was all one take, making it "so starkly dissimilar from any other thing on TV". She said the episode influenced her to think about breaking the mold and "the different ways I could do things that were already established as, 'Well, this is just how it's done'."
