= List of Mad About You episodes =

The episode list for the NBC series, Mad About You. In total, there were 176 episodes broadcast over eight seasons.

== Series overview ==
Season	Episodes	Originally released		
Season	Episodes	First released	Last released	Network
1	22	September 23, 1992	May 22, 1993	NBC
2	25	September 16, 1993	May 19, 1994	NBC
3	24	September 22, 1994	May 18, 1995	NBC
4	24	September 24, 1995	May 19, 1996	NBC
5	24	September 17, 1996	May 20, 1997	NBC
6	23	September 23, 1997	May 19, 1998	NBC
7	22	September 22, 1998	May 24, 1999	NBC
8	12	November 20, 2019	December 18, 2019	Spectrum

== Episodes ==
=== Season 1 (1992–93) ===
No. overall	No. in season	Title	Directed by	Written by	Original release date	Prod. code	U.S. viewers (millions)
1	1	"Romantic Improvisations"	Barnet Kellman	Danny Jacobson & Paul Reiser	September 24, 1992	101	16.3
Paul and Jamie try to find a moment to themselves while dealing with an unplanned dinner party.
2	2	"Sofa's Choice"	Barnet Kellman	Danny Jacobson & Paul Reiser	October 1, 1992	104	14.6
The new couple shops for a sofa with Jamie's best friends, Fran and Mark.
3	3	"Sunday Times"	Barnet Kellman	Jeffrey Lane	October 8, 1992	103	16.6
Paul and Jamie debate what to do together while working their way through the Sunday New York Times.
4	4	"Out of the Past"	Barnet Kellman	Steve Paymer	October 15, 1992	102	14.1
Paul's college crush (Lisa Edelstein) comes to town, stirring up old feelings.
5	5	"Paul in the Family"	Paul Lazarus	Daryl Rowland & Lisa DeBenedictis	October 22, 1992	106	13.4
When Jamie's parents (Paul Dooley and Nancy Dussault) come for a visit, it causes anxiety for everyone. This episode marks the only time Dooley and Dussault would play Jamie's parents. When next seen (in season 3), the roles would be played by John Karlen and Penny Fuller; in season 5 the roles would be recast again with Carroll O'Connor and Carol Burnett.
6	6	"I'm Just So Happy for You"	Barnet Kellman	Billy Grundfest	October 29, 1992	105	14.0
Paul tries to be happy for Jamie when she lands a huge assignment at work on the same day his film is rejected.
7	7	"Token Friend"	Paul Lazarus	Sally Lapiduss & Pamela Eells	November 5, 1992	107	13.0
Paul meets his former film-school classmate (Steve Buscemi), who now works as a token clerk in the subway after dropping out.
8	8	"The Apartment"	Barnet Kellman	Danny Jacobson & Steve Paymer	November 12, 1992	109	14.6
Jamie asks Paul to give up his bachelor pad, which he sublets to a guy called Kramer (Michael Richards of Seinfeld).
9	9	"Riding Backwards"	Barnet Kellman	Jeffrey Lane	November 19, 1992	111	14.2
Relationships are strained as the couples ride the train toward Thanksgiving with their families.
10	10	"Neighbors from Hell"	Dennis Erdman	Paul Reiser & Billy Grundfest	November 26, 1992	110	13.2
Jamie tries hard to encourage their British neighbors to like her.
11	11	"Met Someone"	Barnet Kellman	Danny Jacobson	December 17, 1992	113	12.1
A flashback reveals how Paul and Jamie met in 1989. Lisa Kudrow makes her first appearance in the series, but as Karen; she will later play Ursula, the waitress at Riff's.
12	12	"Maid About You"	Barnet Kellman	Daryl Rowland & Lisa DeBenedictis	January 7, 1993	108	13.5
Jamie employs a maid, who develops a crush on Paul.
13	13	"Togetherness"	Barnet Kellman	Steve Paymer	January 21, 1993	112	11.4
Paul directs a commercial for the PR campaign Jamie is working on. Final appearance of Tommy Hinkley as Selby.
14	14	"Weekend Getaway"	Linda Day	Daryl Rowland & Lisa DeBenedictis	February 4, 1993	116	N/A
The Buchmans head to Vermont for a stress-escaping long weekend.
15	15	"The Wedding Affair"	Linda Day	Billy Grundfest & Paul Reiser	February 11, 1993	115	15.1
Paul and Jamie attend a wedding, which brings up secrets from their dating period. First appearance of John Pankow as Ira.
16	16	"Love Among the Tiles"	Linda Day	Sally Lapiduss & Pamela Eells	February 18, 1993	114	15.2
Paul and Jamie are trapped in the bathroom on Valentine's Day.
17	17	"The Billionaire"	Linda Day	Sally Lapiduss & Pamela Eells	March 4, 1993	118	15.8
An eccentric billionaire (Jerry Lewis) asks Paul to make a film about him.
18	18	"The Man Who Said Hello"	Linda Day	Jeffrey Lane & Danny Jacobson	April 22, 1993	119	15.2
Paul's father shouts "Hello" to Regis Philbin in public, to the embarrassment of Paul, and becomes a public interest story.
19	19	"Swept Away"	Linda Day	Steve Paymer	April 29, 1993	117	13.8
Jamie has good feelings about Lisa's new boyfriend until they decide to move in together.
20	20	"The Spy Girl Who Loved Me"	Barnet Kellman	Billy Grundfest & Paul Reiser	May 6, 1993	120	13.5
Paul and Ira war for the attention of Jamie's new client, the woman who played their childhood love, Spy Girl. (Guest star Barbara Feldon)
21	21	"The Painter"	Barnet Kellman	Danny Jacobson & Jeffrey Lane	May 13, 1993	122	14.9
Jamie's ex-boyfriend paints their apartment and Fran ends up in bed with him because Mark left her to "find himself".
22	22	"Happy Anniversary"	Barnet Kellman	Sally Lapiduss & Pamela Eells	May 20, 1993	121	12.7
Paul recreates the cake-cutting ceremony from their wedding as an anniversary surprise; Mark leaves New York.

=== Season 2 (1993–94) ===
No. overall	No. in season	Title	Directed by	Written by	Original release date	Prod. code	U.S. viewers (millions)
23	1	"Murray's Tale"	Thomas Schlamme	Billy Grundfest	September 16, 1993	202	16.4
Lisa takes Murray for a walk and returns with the wrong dog.
24	2	"Bing, Bang, Boom"	Lee Shallat	Billy Grundfest & Paul Reiser	September 23, 1993	201	16.7
Paul and Jamie attempt a romantic night, but Murray's pursuit of an imaginary mouse is just one deterrent of many.
25	3	"Bedfellows"	Thomas Schlamme	Danny Jacobson	September 30, 1993	203	16.4
Paul and Jamie offer to stay with his mother after his father collapses.
26	4	"Married to the Job"	Thomas Schlamme	Russ Woody	October 7, 1993	205	16.3
Jamie must deal with the consequences of her boss hearing her and Paul insulting him. First appearance of Lisa Kudrow in the role of Ursula.
27	5	"So I Married a Hair Murderer"	Thomas Schlamme	Andrew Gordon & Eileen Conn	October 14, 1993	204	17.7
Jobless and bored, Jamie drives Paul mad looking for things to do.
28	6	"The Unplanned Child"	Thomas Schlamme	Jack Burditt	October 28, 1993	207	17.6
Paul and Jamie look after Paul's nephew on Halloween. Talia Balsam originates the role of Paul's sister Debbie in this one episode; in all future appearances, the role would be played by Robin Bartlett.
29	7	"Natural History"	Thomas Schlamme	Steve Paymer	November 4, 1993	206	18.9
Paul and Jamie argue whether fate or chance brought them together.
30	8	"Surprise"	Lee Shallat	S : Beth Fieger Falkenstein; T : Jeffrey Lane	November 11, 1993	209	17.2
Jamie's 30th-birthday plans go awry.
31	9	"A Pair of Hearts"	Tom Moore	Danny Jacobson	November 18, 1993	210	16.1
Ira's wife (guest star Cyndi Lauper) appears during a trip to Atlantic City.
32	10	"It's a Wrap"	Tom Moore	Andrew Gordon & Eileen Conn	December 2, 1993	208	16.4
While Jamie envies Paul for doing a job he loves, he struggles to protect his film from his overzealous producer. Meanwhile, Jamie decides she wants to go back to college.
33	11	"Edna Returns"	Tom Moore	S : Jack Burditt; T : Andrew Gordon & Eileen Conn	December 9, 1993	211	17.2
Lisa appears, under a pseudonym, in a chapter of her therapist's new book.
34	12	"Paul Is Dead"	Lee Shallat	S : Russ Woody; S/T : Billy Grundfest	January 6, 1994	212	20.9
Paul and Jamie's assets are mistakenly frozen because another Paul Buchman has died.
35	13	"Same Time Next Week"	Thomas Schlamme	Jeffrey Lane & Danny Jacobson	January 13, 1994	213	21.1
Paul is shooting a film in Chicago for a couple of months, only coming home for weekends.
36	14	"The Late Show"	Thomas Schlamme	Andrew Gordon & Eileen Conn	January 27, 1994	214	21.8
Paul and Jamie unknowingly cover up the unexpected consequences of the Atlantic-City trip.
37	15	"Virtual Reality"	Thomas Schlamme	Danny Jacobson & Jeffrey Lane	February 3, 1994	216	20.9
Ira wants Paul to invest in a company developing virtual reality. Guest appearances by Christie Brinkley and Andre Agassi.
38	16	"Cold Feet"	Thomas Schlamme	Jeffrey Lane & Danny Jacobson	February 10, 1994	218	22.2
Paul and Jamie recall his proposal of three years before.
39	17	"Instant Karma"	Lee Shallat	S : Dana Reston & Frank Lombardi; S/T : Beth Fieger Falkenstein	February 14, 1994	215	15.8
Jamie's fortune cookie reads "Bad luck follows the guilty." Yoko Ono calls Paul.
40	18	"The Tape"	Tom Moore	Paul Reiser	February 24, 1994	217	16.6
Paul and Jamie must track down a homemade sex tape before anyone sees it.
41	19	"Love Letters"	Tom Moore	Jeffrey Klarik	March 10, 1994	219	18.2
Paul and Jamie discover letters behind their toilet, written by a soldier and his girlfriend during World War II.
42	20	"The Last Scampi"	Tom Moore	Billy Grundfest	April 7, 1994	220	17.5
Paul and Jamie's mothers are angry with them; Murray is depressed.
43	21	"Disorientation"	Tom Moore	Jack Burditt & Jeffrey Lane	April 28, 1994	222	15.5
Paul has forgotten to mail in Jamie's registration, so he, Ira, Fran and Lisa must register her at the very last minute--as she navigates her first day of class.
44	22	"Storms We Cannot Weather"	David Steinberg	Danny Jacobson	May 5, 1994	221	15.4
Jamie arranges a blind date for Fran; Paul runs into Mark, who now works as a busboy.
45	23	"Up All Night"	Michael Lembeck	Jeffrey Klarik	May 12, 1994	225	15.1
Jamie cannot fall asleep the night before a big test. John Astin and Garth Brooks appear.
46	24	"With This Ring..."	Tom Moore	Part 1: Jeffrey Lane; Part 2: S : Danny Jacobson; S/T : Jeffrey Lane	May 19, 1994	223 224	18.9
47	25	"With This Ring..."	Tom Moore	Part 1: Jeffrey Lane; Part 2: S : Danny Jacobson; S/T : Jeffrey Lane	May 19, 1994	223 224	18.9
Everybody congratulates the couple on their second anniversary, but they're not so happy over Paul's lost ring. Paul and Jamie exchange positions over having a baby soon.

=== Season 3 (1994–95) ===
No. overall	No. in season	Title	Directed by	Written by	Original release date	Prod. code	U.S. viewers (millions)
48	1	"Escape from New York"	David Steinberg	Danny Jacobson & Jeffrey Lane	September 22, 1994	301	23.2
Paul and Jamie deal with the annual New York heatwave by searching for an old-favorite clam restaurant.
49	2	"Home"	David Steinberg	Jack Burditt	September 29, 1994	302	21.5
While the Buchmans feud with neighbours greedy for their apartment, their dogs get along all the better.
50	3	"Till Death Do Us Part"	David Steinberg	Danny Jacobson	October 6, 1994	303	19.9
Jamie must decide what to do with her uncle's ashes.
51	4	"When I'm Sixty-Four"	David Steinberg	Victor Levin	October 13, 1994	304	21.5
Jamie must get glasses; she and Paul get involved in their super's marital spat.
52	5	"Legacy"	David Steinberg	S : Steve Paymer; S/T : Jeffrey Lane	October 20, 1994	305	20.0
When she does PR the annual midnight sale at Burt's sporting-goods store, Jamie mulls starting her own PR business; meanwhile, Paul thinks Jamie is outdoing him in productivity, and he learns that Burt's leaving the store to Ira when he retires.
53	6	"Pandora's Box"	David Steinberg	Victor Fresco	November 3, 1994	306	24.5
While trying to steal cable TV for the bedroom, Jamie accidentally causes a blackout in New York City. This episode ties in with the Friends episode "The One with the Blackout", and the Madman of the People episode "Birthday in the Big House".
54	7	"The Ride Home"	David Steinberg	Liz Coe	November 10, 1994	307	22.8
During the taxi ride home from Fran's birthday party, Jamie and Paul take turns apologizing for what happened there.
55	8	"Giblets for Murray"	David Steinberg	S : Billy Grundfest; S/T : Jeffrey Klarik	November 17, 1994	308	23.4
Paul and Jamie host a very complicated Thanksgiving Day.
56	9	"Once More With Feeling"	David Steinberg	S : Dan Greenberg; S/T : Victor Levin	December 8, 1994	309	21.4
When Paul and Jamie have trouble performing their marital duties, somehow their friends get the worst of it.
57	10	"The City"	David Steinberg	Paul Reiser	December 15, 1994	310	19.2
An outing to see the feel-good movie of the year yields radically opposite results. Special appearance by Rudy Giuliani.
58	11	"Our Fifteen Minutes"	Thomas Schlamme	Jack Burditt	January 5, 1995	311	24.8
After a slow start, Paul's project to record 15 unvarnished minutes of the couple's lives succeeds spectacularly.
59	12	"How to Fall in Love"	Thomas Schlamme	Jeffrey Lane	January 19, 1995	313	24.0
Paul and Jamie have a little competition on pick-up techniques.
60	13	"Mad About You"	David Steinberg	Danny Jacobson & Jeffrey Klarik	February 2, 1995	314 315	27.8
61	14	"Mad About You"	David Steinberg	Danny Jacobson & Jeffrey Klarik	February 2, 1995	314 315	27.8
Paul and Jamie prepare for marriage, as told in flashback. Guest stars Lyle Lovett.
62	15	"Just My Dog"	Thomas Schlamme	Andrew Gordon & Eileen Conn	February 9, 1995	312	22.6
Murray becomes a TV star.
63	16	"The Alan Brady Show"	Gordon Hunt	Kenny Schwartz	February 16, 1995	316	23.9
Paul deals with the ego of a TV star for his film (Carl Reiner reprises the role that he created in The Dick Van Dyke Show). In 1997, TV Guide ranked this episode #84 on its list of the 100 Greatest Episodes.
64	17	"Mad Without You"	Michael Lembeck	Billy Grundfest	February 23, 1995	317	23.9
Jamie leaves for a weekend, reassured that Paul will be all right.
65	18	"Purseona"	Michael Lembeck	Andrew Gordon & Eileen Conn	March 9, 1995	318	22.1
Lisa accidentally switches purses with Jamie, causing Paul to lose his passport.
66	19	"Two Tickets to Paradise"	Michael Lembeck	Rick Wiener	March 30, 1995	319	22.7
Paul and Jamie, aka Burt and Sylvia, head to a paradisical Caribbean holiday.
67	20	"Money Changes Everything"	Michael Lembeck	Victor Fresco	April 27, 1995	323	18.1
Helping Ira shoulder a big loan leaves Paul with a sore neck. Cyndi Lauper guest stars.
68	21	"Cake Fear"	Michael Lembeck	Jeffrey Lane	May 4, 1995	321	18.3
Jamie sentences Paul: "You are going to have a good birthday if it kills you."
69	22	"My Boyfriend's Back"	Michael Lembeck	Victor Fresco & Victor Levin	May 11, 1995	320	16.5
Jamie and an ex (Eric Stoltz) work together on a Diner's campaign and rekindle old hostilities, making Jamie shamefully powerful. Jamie then discovers that he has made her the villain of his Comic Book and their relationship is the story.
70	23	"Up in Smoke"	Michael Lembeck	Part 1: S : Jeffrey Lane; T : Andrew Gordon & Eileen Conn & Jeffrey Klarik; Part 2: T : Jack Burditt; S/T : Jeffrey Lane	May 18, 1995	322 324	20.9
71	24	"Up in Smoke"	Michael Lembeck	Part 1: S : Jeffrey Lane; T : Andrew Gordon & Eileen Conn & Jeffrey Klarik; Part 2: T : Jack Burditt; S/T : Jeffrey Lane	May 18, 1995	322 324	20.9
An evening at the Twilight Room to celebrate their anniversary turns into "The Twilight Zone", where Paul and Jamie find themselves in a world where they never met.

=== Season 4 (1995–96) ===
Filming of Season 4 was delayed to allow Helen Hunt to complete work on the film Twister (1996) which was running behind schedule.

No. overall	No. in season	Title	Directed by	Written by	Original release date	Prod. code	U.S. viewers (millions)
72	1	"New Sleep-Walking PLUS"	David Steinberg	Paul Reiser	September 26, 1995	401	23.0
Paul doesn't remember a night of passion with Jamie.
73	2	"The Parking Space"	David Steinberg	Billy Grundfest	October 3, 1995	402	17.6
Paul agonizes over buying a parking space in his building.
74	3	"The Test"	Michael Lembeck	Kenny Schwartz & Rick Wiener	October 17, 1995	403	17.7
Jamie finds a relationship test in a magazine while she and Paul wait for a bus. (Compilation of clips from past seasons.)
75	4	"The Good, the Bad and the Not-So-Appealing"	David Steinberg	Victor Levin	October 24, 1995	404	18.9
Jamie is determined to bond with Sylvia.
76	5	"I Don't See It"	Gordon Hunt	Brenda Hampton	October 31, 1995	405	18.6
Paul almost ruins Jamie and Fran's chances of having full-time jobs with the Mayor's office.
77	6	"Yoko Said"	David Steinberg	Billy Grundfest & Paul Reiser	November 7, 1995	406	17.2
Paul gets a chance to shoot a documentary with Yoko Ono.
78	7	"An Angel for Murray"	David Steinberg	Seth Kurland	November 14, 1995	407	15.6
Paul and Jamie hire a dogwalker who exceeds expectations. First appearance of Hank Azaria as Nat.
79	8	"The Couple"	David Steinberg	Kenny Schwartz	November 28, 1995	408	18.9
Paul and Jamie eagerly befriend a strange new couple, stirring up problems with friends and themselves.
80	9	"New Year's Eve"	David Steinberg	Scott Silveri & Shana Goldberg-Meehan	December 12, 1995	409	13.8
Jamie and Paul try not to be apart for New Year's Eve.
81	10	"Ovulation Day"	David Steinberg	Victor Levin & Danny Jacobson	January 9, 1996	410	23.8
Jamie's insistence to conceive her child precisely on ovulation day strains everyone to the breaking point, especially when Debbie's coming-out intervenes.
82	11	"Get Back"	David Steinberg	S : Seth Kurland & Ron Darian; T : Kenny Schwartz & Shana Goldberg-Meehan & Scott Silveri	January 16, 1996	411	16.2
Paul injures Jamie's back during sex and has to run her errands (Jamie finally sees Murray's mouse, and Paul translates on the fly).
83	12	"Dream Weaver"	Thomas Schlamme	Billy Grundfest	January 30, 1996	412	18.1
Paul and Jamie try to make sense of their extremely weird dreams; the Laugh In crew appears.
84	13	"Hot and Cold"	Thomas Schlamme	Kenny Schwartz & Danny Jacobson	February 6, 1996	414	13.3
Ira starts gambling again; Paul and Jamie try to keep their sex life on track.
85	14	"Fertility"	Gordon Hunt	S : Liz Sagal & McNally Sagal; T : Larry Charles	February 13, 1996	415	16.0
Jamie and Paul struggle to increase her fertility; Paul films fertile Pandas.
86	15	"Everybody Hates Me"	Thomas Schlamme	Victor Levin	February 20, 1996	413	14.6
Ira's heart is broken by a girlfriend whose beauty inspires Jamie to dye her hair.
87	16	"Do Me a Favor"	Gordon Hunt	Ron Darian	February 27, 1996	416	15.8
An innocent photograph leads to Jamie inadvertently blackmailing her boss.
88	17	"The Glue People"	David Steinberg	Victor Levin	March 26, 1996	417	14.4
Paul and Jamie invite Ira, Iris, Mark, and Fran for reconciliation, but the tables turn on them; directing a campaign commercial, Paul feels like Leni Riefenstahl.
89	18	"The Sample"	David Steinberg	Ron Darian & Seth Kurland & Larry Charles	April 9, 1996	418	14.4
Paul's sperm sample is missing after the Buchmans' car is stolen.
90	19	"The Procedure"	David Steinberg	Brenda Hampton & Larry Charles	April 23, 1996	419	14.0
While Jamie is in the hospital to determine if she can get pregnant, Paul's job is on the line when Ira poses as his agent.
91	20	"The Weed"	David Steinberg	Billy Grundfest & Larry Charles	April 30, 1996	420	14.9
Paul's obsession with perfection gets him fired; Jamie's boss is caught accepting money from a mobster.
92	21	"The Award"	David Steinberg	Ron Darian & Seth Kurland & Larry Charles	May 7, 1996	421	15.0
Upset that Jamie cannot accompany him to an awards dinner, Paul almost leaves it with another woman.
93	22	"The Finale: Part 1"	David Steinberg	Victor Levin & Billy Grundfest & Larry Charles	May 14, 1996	422	19.3
Jamie kisses a colleague, and Paul reveals to her that he almost went home with another woman.
94	23	"The Finale: Parts 2 & 3"	David Steinberg	Part 2: Paul Reiser & Victor Levin & Billy Grundfest & Larry Charles; Part 3: Victor Levin & Billy Grundfest & Paul Reiser & Larry Charles	May 21, 1996	423 424	22.9
95	24	"The Finale: Parts 2 & 3"	David Steinberg	Part 2: Paul Reiser & Victor Levin & Billy Grundfest & Larry Charles; Part 3: Victor Levin & Billy Grundfest & Paul Reiser & Larry Charles	May 21, 1996	423 424	22.9
Ira and Lisa try to engineer the Buchman reconciliation; Paul and Jamie try working through their problems. With their marriage on the verge of collapse, Paul prepares to leave Jamie--can anything turn the situation around?

=== Season 5 (1996–97) ===
No. overall	No. in season	Title	Directed by	Written by	Original release date	Prod. code	U.S. viewers (millions)
96	1	"Dr. Wonderful"	Michael Lembeck	Victor Levin & Larry Charles	September 24, 1996	501	20.49
Jamie and Paul find out that they are expecting! Deciding not to tell anyone yet, they look for a new gynecologist; Paul's parents meet Joan.
97	2	"The Grant"	Michael Lembeck	Jenji Kohan & Victor Levin & Richard Day & Larry Charles	October 1, 1996	502	17.7
Jamie and Paul quit drinking coffee, causing Jamie to gaffe at work; Paul and Ira visit Paul's Uncle Phil (Mel Brooks), who gives Paul an idea for his next documentary.
98	3	"Therapy"	Michael Lembeck	Richard Day	October 8, 1996	503	13.0
Paul and Jamie visit therapist Dr. Sheila Kleinman (Mo Gaffney); Paul tries to film his parents for the documentary.
99	4	"The Clip Show"	Michael Lembeck	Jonathan Leigh Solomon & Leslie Caveny	October 15, 1996	506	13.8
Paul and Jamie spend time stomach-listening, looking for a response from their baby. (Compilation of clips from past seasons.)
100	5	"Burt's Building"	Michael Lembeck	Ron Darian & Victor Levin & Larry Charles	October 22, 1996	507	15.5
After being late to their appointment with Joan to listen to the baby's heartbeat, Paul tells of his day with Burt looking for their old apartment.
101	6	"Jamie's Parents"	Michael Lembeck	Maria Semple	October 29, 1996	504	21.24
Jamie's parents Theresa (Carol Burnett) and Gus (Carroll O'Connor) visit; they're planning a cross-country RV trip when they suddenly break up, and Paul and Jamie try to reunite them.
102	7	"Outbreak"	David Steinberg	Richard Day	November 5, 1996	508	19.02
Paul and Jamie plan to announce their baby news at Thanksgiving – but the word gets out early and they try to squelch the "outbreak". Guest stars Kevin Bacon.
103	8	"Every Good Boy Deserves Fudge"	David Steinberg	Victor Levin	November 12, 1996	510	16.00
Paul contemplates abstinence until July (Ira discourages it); Jamie talks Paul into a trip upstate where they discover that a country store's homemade fudge has aphrodisiac qualities.
104	9	"The Gym"	Michael Lembeck	Victor Levin & Richard Day & Larry Charles	November 19, 1996	505	14.6
Jamie gets a free pass to the gym where Paul works out but he does not want her there. Jamie gives away the pass to a homeless man named Virgil (Bruno Kirby). Paul likes to be a man of mystery, and he avoids saying anything significant to the gym members.
105	10	"Chicken Man"	David Steinberg	Jonathan Leigh Solomon & Ron Darian & Larry Charles	November 26, 1996	509	15.80
Ira becomes a producer and tastes oily water.
106	11	"The Recital"	David Steinberg	Moses Port & David Guarascio & Jenji Kohan & Maria Semple	December 17, 1996	511	16.10
Paul and Jamie offend Fran by critiquing her son's violin playing.
107	12	"The Handyman"	David Steinberg	Richard Day	January 21, 1997	512	17.63
Paul and Jamie accidentally break up Lisa's engagement.
108	13	"Astrology"	David Steinberg	Jenji Kohan & Larry Charles	February 4, 1997	515	N/A
Nat's sister makes accurate predictions.
109	14	"The Penis"	David Steinberg	Maria Semple & Richard Day & Larry Charles	February 11, 1997	514	14.81
Paul and Jamie debate learning their child's gender; Uncle Phil makes a dying request.
110	15	"Citizen Buchman"	David Steinberg	Victor Levin	February 18, 1997	513	13.84
Paul tries deciphering his dying uncle's last words. Guest stars Sid Caesar.
111	16	"Her Houseboy, Coco"	Gordon Hunt	Victor Levin	February 25, 1997	517	13.51
When Jamie is prescribed bedrest, a steadily increasing stream of family pampers her; Nat kidnaps Murray.
112	17	"On the Road"	David Steinberg	Paul Reiser & Ron Darian & Larry Charles	March 11, 1997	516	14.81
Paul overcompensates manliness when Jamie plans a baby shower.
113	18	"The Cockatoo"	Gordon Hunt	Maria Semple & Richard Day	April 1, 1997	518	14.70
Jamie ignores Paul at the breakfast table, then tries to quit her job; Ira teaches a bird a naughty phrase.
114	19	"The Touching Game"	Gordon Hunt	S : Jenji Kohan & Jonathan Leigh Solomon & Moses Port & David Guarascio; T : Maria Semple & Ron Darian	April 22, 1997	522	13.15
Paul's raisin bran lacks raisins; Jamie hinders a newly opened coffee shop; Paul offends a fellow bus passenger.
115	20	"The Dry Run"	Michael Lembeck	Moses Port & David Guarascio & Larry Charles	April 29, 1997	519	13.41
Jamie fights to return a video--and wins; Paul and Jamie are kicked out of birth class while Ira and Sylvia search for a spoon.
116	21	"Guardianhood"	Michael Lembeck	S : Jonathan Leigh Solomon; T : Victor Levin	May 6, 1997	520	12.39
Paul and Jamie try to find a guardian for their child; an infatuated 18-year-old (Seth Green) haunts Jamie.
117	22	"The Feud"	Gordon Hunt	Richard Day	May 13, 1997	521	14.44
A taste war ensues when Jamie and Paul receive cribs from both sets of grandparents-to-be.
118	23	"The Birth"	Gordon Hunt	Larry Charles	May 20, 1997	523 524	25.67
119	24	"The Birth"	Gordon Hunt	Larry Charles	May 20, 1997	523 524	25.67
Paul's documentary gets a surprisingly good review at a film festival and Jamie has a labor false-alarm. At the hospital, Paul gets a tour of it courtesy of Bruce Willis. Michael Moore also stars.

=== Season 6 (1997–98) ===
No. overall	No. in season	Title	Directed by	Written by	Original release date	Prod. code	U.S. viewers (millions)
120	1	"Coming Home"	Gordon Hunt	Victor Levin	September 23, 1997	601	24.63
The family meets Paul and Jamie's unnamed child.
121	2	"Letters to Mabel"	Gordon Hunt	Maria Semple	September 30, 1997	602	15.63
Jamie writes a letter for daughter to read on her 18th birthday. Ira and Joan join in on the fun, but Paul makes a video instead of a letter.
122	3	"Speed Baby"	Gordon Hunt	Roger Director	October 7, 1997	603	17.02
Mabel can only sleep when she's kept in motion.
123	4	"Uncle Phil and the Coupons"	David Steinberg	Paul Reiser & Victor Levin	October 14, 1997	605	14.82
Uncle Phil tries to provide gifts for Mabel with disastrous results.
124	5	"Moody Blues"	Gordon Hunt	Lisa Melamed	October 21, 1997	604	15.31
Paul must deal with a moody Jamie while putting on a production of The Pirates of Penzance.
125	6	"The Magic Pants"	Gordon Hunt	Mike Martineau	October 28, 1997	606	14.74
A mix-up at the cleaners leaves Paul wearing David Copperfield's pants.
126	7	"Le Sex Show"	Gordon Hunt	Moses Port & David Guarascio	November 4, 1997	608	15.19
Paul and Jamie try to ease back into relations for the first time since Mabel's birth.
127	8	"The New Friend"	Gordon Hunt	S : David Steven Simon; T : Lissa Levin & Maria Semple	November 11, 1997	607	14.13
Paul and Jamie meet new neighbor Sarah, a divorced mother of three who offers Jamie a more casual parenting style. Paul wins one of those genius grants and nobody can take his new 'genius' status seriously except him.
128	9	"The Conversation"	Gordon Hunt	Victor Levin	November 18, 1997	609	17.94
Paul and Jamie have an uninterrupted 20-minute conversation in front of the bedroom door, trying to train Mabel to get to sleep on her own. When this episode was originally broadcast on NBC, it was aired uninterrupted, with commercials airing only after the theme song and before the end credits. The 20-minute conversation between Paul and Jamie outside the baby's room, filmed in one take, is shown straight through.
129	10	"Breastfeeding"	David Steinberg	Lissa Levin	November 25, 1997	610	15.02
Mabel is weaned off of nursing; Ira fixes a children's hockey game.
130	11	"Good Old Reliable Nathan"	Michael Lembeck	S : Susan Dickes & Jonathan Leigh Solomon; T : Victor Levin	December 16, 1997	611	16.12
Paul is shocked to discover that Jamie lost her virginity to a visiting professor (Nathan Lane). In a comedy of errors, the professor believes Paul is angry and wants to hurt him. Meanwhile, Ira meets a woman who sleeps with him only to get better burial plots.
131	12	"Separate Planes"	Gordon Hunt	Andy Glickman	January 13, 1998	613	15.85
Jamie and Paul take one plane each to increase the chances of one of them living through the plane ride.
132	13	"Cheating on Sheila"	Helen Hunt	Sheila R. Lawrence	February 3, 1998	615	13.43
After a few frustrating sessions, Paul and Jamie leave Sheila for someone more impressive, but startling news sends them back.
133	14	"Back to Work"	David Steinberg	Mary Connelly	February 10, 1998	616	12.37
Not wanting to go back to work, Jamie tries to get herself fired; Paul confronts the newspaper journalist who wrote an error-filled article about his film Buchman.
134	15	"The Second Mrs. Buchman"	David Steinberg	David Steven Simon	February 17, 1998	618	14.07
Jamie finds a thank-you letter to Paul and learns that he has an ex-wife.
135	16	"The Coin of Destiny"	Michael Lembeck	Christopher Case	February 24, 1998	614	12.53
Paul innocently flips a coin to make a decision when his former producer, Lou Bonaparte, overhears a conversation that puts Paul and Jamie in the limelight with the tabloid program; Sylvia and Burt try their luck in Atlantic City, relying on the wisdom of Paul's "coin of destiny".
136	17	"The Caper"	David Steinberg	Victor Levin	March 24, 1998	620	13.14
The couple's British neighbors suspect Paul's birthday-party guests of art theft.
137	18	"The Baby Video"	Michael Lembeck	Roger Director	March 31, 1998	612	11.71
Paul, Jamie and Ira decide to make a baby video, but Paul as the Sandman frightens the kids too much.
138	19	"Fire at Riff's"	Craig Knizek	Jonathan Leigh Solomon	April 14, 1998	619	10.49
During a fire at Riff's, Joan and Debbie reevaluate their relationship, Ira hooks up with Ursula, Paul and Jamie have a tiff, and Ira has a sandwich named after him.
139	20	"Mother's Day"	Helen Hunt	Susan Dickes	April 28, 1998	617	10.39
Jamie shakes Paul's soda can when he is not looking and it's pointing toward her when she opens it; Mother's Day creates innumerable opportunities for jealousy among mothers both old and new.
140	21	"Paul Slips in the Shower"	David Steinberg	Paul Reiser & Victor Levin	May 5, 1998	621	10.48
Paul's life flashes before his eyes when he slips in the shower.
141	22	"Nat & Arley"	Gordon Hunt	S : David Steven Simon; T : Moses Port & David Guarascio	May 12, 1998	622	11.83
Paul and Jamie try to match Nat up with Arley the babysitter; a sleeping disorder makes Jamie beat up Paul without realizing it.
142	23	"The Finale"	Gordon Hunt	Victor Levin	May 19, 1998	623	14.05
Paul's latest project is 'The Making of "The Making of Titanic".' He accidentally causes the caterer (Ellen DeGeneres) on the set to be fired, then hires her as a nanny. (This episode's simple title was previously used at the end of season 4, although it is a different episode.)

=== Season 7 (1998–99) ===
No. overall	No. in season	Title	Directed by	Written by	Original release date	Prod. code	U.S. viewers (millions)
143	1	"Season Opener"	Michael Lembeck	Victor Levin	September 22, 1998	701	14.05
Paul makes a sandwich with bad meat; Paul takes Viagra and Jamie is locked out of her gym in just a towel; Paul meets Jerry Seinfeld in the street.
144	2	"A Pain in the Neck"	Gordon Hunt	Monica Piper	September 29, 1998	704	11.63
Mabel's first word is a bad one; Paul has his tonsils removed and Jamie loathes his nurse (Jean Louisa Kelly).
145	3	"Tragedy Plus Time"	Gordon Hunt	Christopher Case	October 27, 1998	705	10.02
An old boyfriend of Jamie's (Eric Stoltz) dies and leaves her $35,000; Paul and Jamie are sued by their therapist after he accidentally hits her in the face with a golf club.
146	4	"There's a Puma in the Kitchen"	David Steinberg	Billy Grundfest	November 3, 1998	703	10.33
Paul tries to practice a new laugh; Lisa adopts a vicious cat and leaves it with Paul and Jamie; Jamie learns the benefits of a "nooner".
147	5	"The Silent Show"	Gordon Hunt	Mary Connelly	November 10, 1998	706	10.80
Jamie sneezes multiple times; STOMP lives upstairs from her and Paul; their therapist tells them to go the rest of the day without verbal communication.
148	6	"Weekend in L.A."	David Steinberg	Maria A. Brown	November 17, 1998	708	10.17
Paul and Jamie go to LA to meet Gardner Malloy, the superagent who wants to represent Paul. The life of luxury makes them reluctant to go back.
149	7	"The Thanksgiving Show"	Gordon Hunt	Hayes Jackson	November 24, 1998	707	9.89
Paul and Jamie host Thanksgiving and play charades with the guests.
150	8	"The Buried Fight"	Gordon Hunt	Adam Markowitz	December 14, 1998	709	8.67
Paul reads a baby book aloud to keep himself entertained; Paul and Jamie start using the Internet; after a small quarrel about Paul rehiring nurse Diane for their neighbor Hal, Paul and Jamie are advised to privately write and bury their complaints.
151	9	"Farmer Buchman"	Helen Hunt	Robert Peacock	January 11, 1999	711	7.74
Jamie's card trick fails, but Paul lets her win. Mr. Wicker asks Paul and Jamie to tend his rooftop garden while he's away; when Mabel loves another baby's rare toy, Jamie steals it for her. Guest Stars Robert Klein.
152	10	"Win a Free Car"	Craig Knizek	Steve Joe & Greg Schaffer	January 18, 1999	710	8.13
Ira tries to revive the business by offering a car to the person who keeps a hand on it the longest. Since he can't afford it, he wants all of the contestants to be ringers.
153	11	"The Honeymoon"	Gordon Hunt	Sheila R. Lawrence	January 25, 1999	713	9.29
Jamie fixes up Paul's nurse Diane with Mabel's pediatrician Dr. Lee. But Diane has a crush on Paul and shouts out his name during sex. Hearing it makes Paul feel flattered and he shouts out his own name during sex.
154	12	"Valentine's Day"	Victor Levin	Victor Levin	February 8, 1999	715	10.41
Paul and Jamie look at a house in Irvington, New York.
155	13	"Virtual Reality II"	David Steinberg	Trish Soodik	February 22, 1999	714	11.02
Paul mops himself into a corner. Paul and Jamie reinvest in a technology company, and they learn their future. Guest stars Mark McGwire.
156	14	"Uncle Phil Goes Back to High School"	Gordon Hunt	Dean Young	March 1, 1999	716	9.35
Uncle Phil goes back to high school and Lisa has breast-implant surgery.
157	15	"Murray at the Dog Show"	Michael Lembeck	Andy Glickman	April 26, 1999	702	7.74
Jamie and Paul are still good at dancing. Therapist Sheila tells the couple they are cured; Jamie tells Paul to have a vasectomy; Murray fights his fear of cats.
158	16	"Millennium Bug"	David Steinberg	Frank van Keeken	April 26, 1999	712	8.63
Albert Einstein calls upon Paul to rid the world of the Millennium Bug.
159	17	"Separate Beds"	Craig Knizek	Bob Nickman	May 3, 1999	717	8.91
Paul and Jamie discover that sleeping separately is more fun, but will it hurt their relationship?
160	18	"Stealing Burt's Car"	Gordon Hunt	Jenna Bruce	May 10, 1999	718	7.50
Worried that Burt and Sylvia's rundown car will cause them to have an accident, Paul and Jamie attempt to steal it so they'd have to buy a new one, but they get arrested.
161	19	"Paved with Good Intentions"	Gordon Hunt	Susan Dickes	May 13, 1999	720	19.39
Paul and Jamie learn that "We love you" can be the harshest words.
162	20	"The Dirty Little Secret"	Gordon Hunt	Elin Hampton	May 17, 1999	719	8.08
Paul and Jamie discover that they are related; they also try to read Moby Dick for a book club.
163	21	"The Final Frontier"	Helen Hunt	S : Helen Hunt; S/T : Paul Reiser & Victor Levin	May 24, 1999	721 722	19.79
164	22	"The Final Frontier"	Helen Hunt	S : Helen Hunt; S/T : Paul Reiser & Victor Levin	May 24, 1999	721 722	19.79
In a series of nonsequential flashbacks, the adult Mabel (Janeane Garofalo) describes the family's next 20 years.

=== Season 8 (2019) ===
On September 5, 2019, it was announced that the first six episodes of the revival would premiere on November 20, 2019, with another six episodes released on December 18, 2019.

No. overall	No. in season	Title	Directed by	Written by	Original release date
165	1	"The Kid Leaves"	Helen Hunt	Story by : Helen Hunt & Paul Reiser & Peter Tolan; Teleplay by : Paul Reiser	November 20, 2019
When Paul and Jamie drop their daughter Mabel off for her first day of college, it quickly becomes clear that they have very different ideas of what their lives after children will look like.
166	2	"Restraining Orders and Puppies"	Betsy Thomas	Julie Mandel-Folly	November 20, 2019
After too many surprise dorm visits, Mabel forces Jamie to sign a contract limiting contact for the next 48 hours, and suddenly Paul finds himself in the parenting hot seat.
167	3	"Body Heat"	Betsy Thomas	Randi Mayem Singer	November 20, 2019
Jamie makes the decision to get back into the work force, but time and menopause conspire against her. Meanwhile, Paul is invited to speak to Mabel’s class only after promising to Mabel that no one will know they’re related.
168	4	"The Toothpick"	Betsy Thomas	Matt Tarses	November 20, 2019
Jamie spins out when one of her meticulously crafted scrapbooks documenting Mabel’s childhood disappears. Meanwhile, Ira shocks everyone (himself included) when he asks Lucia to marry him.
169	5	"Boundaries and Nakedness"	Kelly Park	Abby Gewanter	November 20, 2019
Tonya oversees Jamie’s sessions as she transitions back into the workplace as a therapist. At the gym, Paul is going through a battle of his own as Mark is upset that Paul refuses to be naked around him.
170	6	"Monkeys, Lies and Withholding"	Kelly Park	Peter Tolan	November 20, 2019
Paul and Jamie pay a visit to the retirement home to visit Paul’s mother, Sylvia, and her new boyfriend, Ralph. Meanwhile, an unexpected visitor walks into Ira’s restaurant.
171	7	"The Will to Live"	Phill Lewis	Paul Reiser	December 18, 2019
A childhood friend of Paul and Ira’s has died, and his funeral triggers Paul and Jamie’s concerns about mortality and getting their affairs in order.
172	8	"Anderson Cooper and Other Fantasies"	Phill Lewis	Randi Mayem Singer	December 18, 2019
When Lisa is double-booked on her celebrity pet-sitting obligations, Jamie volunteers Paul to stay at Anderson Cooper’s place, allowing him his first bachelor night in years.
173	9	"The Cheese Stands Alone"	Eric Dean Seaton	Julie Mandel-Folly	December 18, 2019
When Paul and Jamie get a surprise visit from a wealthy buyer interested in their apartment, they're forced to make a tough decision about the future of their home.
174	10	"Real Estate for Beginners"	Eric Dean Seaton	Peter Tolan	December 18, 2019
Following Sheila’s advice, Paul and Jamie head to a marriage boot camp in The Berkshires in hopes of working out their issues. Back in New York, Lisa dog-sits Walter… kind of.
175	11	"Erotica and Expulsion"	Gloria Calderon Kellett	Abby Gewanter	December 18, 2019
Paul and Jamie help Mabel deal with the fallout when a school experiment goes awry. Jamie stumbles upon an unconventional way that Tonya can help Walter overcome his sleepless nights.
176	12	"Happy Birthday, Bon Voyage, Goodbye for Now"	Joanna Kerns	Paul Reiser & Peter Tolan	December 18, 2019
Paul and Jamie attempt to plan a surprise birthday party for Mabel, while Mabel is planning to reveal a big surprise of her own.
