= Tami Maida =

Female American football quarterback

Tami Maida was the groundbreaking junior varsity quarterback at Philomath High School in Philomath, Oregon. In 1981, she became the first known quarterback to also become homecoming princess. After a year at Philomath, she and her family moved back to their hometown of Prince George, British Columbia.

Her story was the basis of the CBS movie Quarterback Princess, with Helen Hunt as Maida.
