= Elinor Lipman =

American author

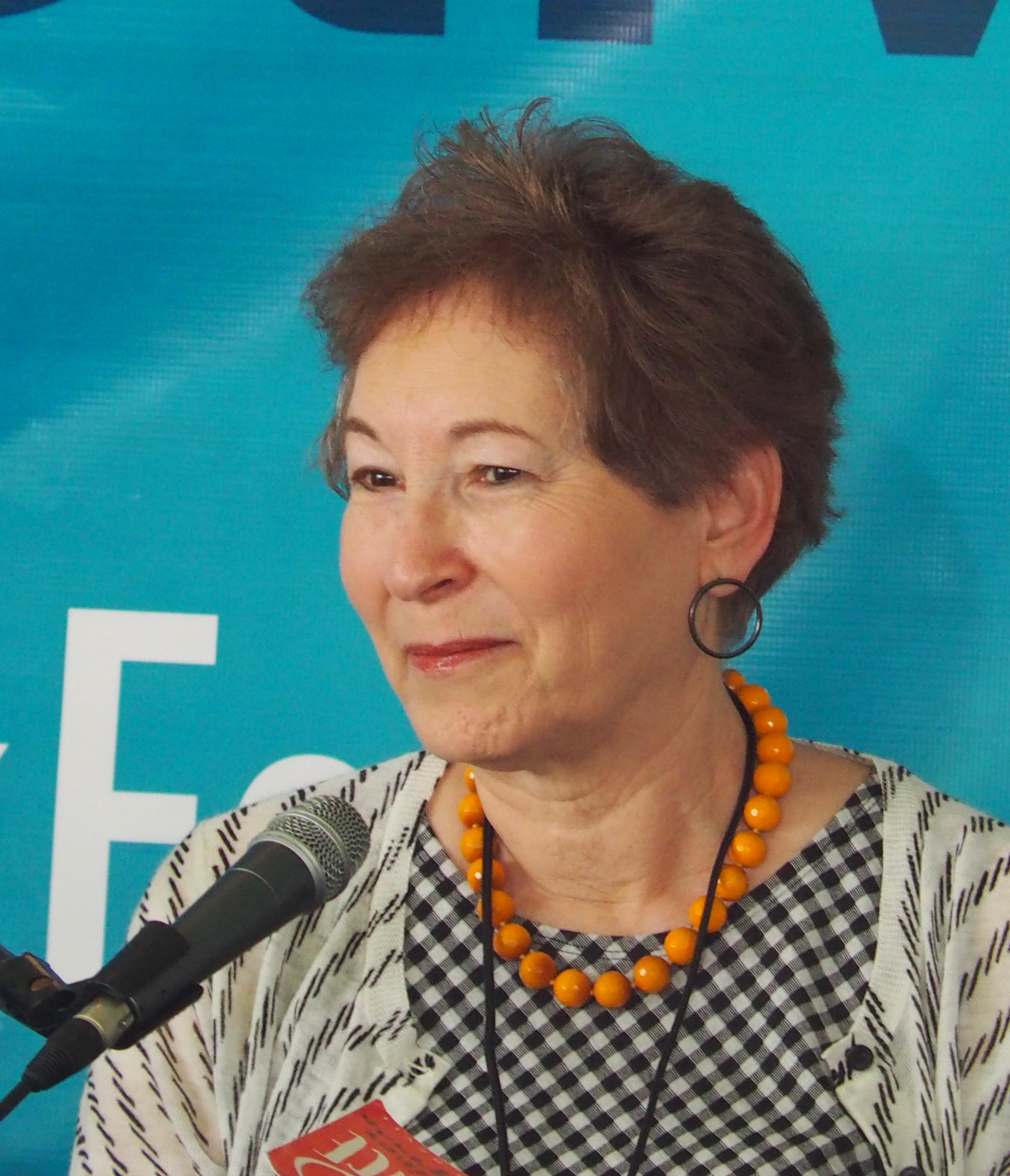
- Lipman in 2019
- Born: October 16, 1950 (age 75); Lowell, Massachusetts, U.S.
- Education: Simmons College (BA)
- Known for: Essays, Novels
- Spouse: Robert Austin

Elinor Lipman (born October 16, 1950) is an American novelist, short story writer, and essayist.

== Early life and education ==
Elinor Lipman was born and raised in Lowell, Massachusetts to a Jewish family. She is the second daughter of Julia M. and Louis S. Lipman. She attended public schools and graduated from Simmons College (now Simmons University) in 1972 with a BA in journalism. While still in college, Lipman worked as an intern for The Sun, a daily newspaper in Lowell.

== Career ==
During the 1970s she was a staff writer and editorial assistant for the Massachusetts Teachers Association's monthly newsletter, Massachusetts Teacher. Lipman also worked for a time for Boston's public television station, WGBH, writing press releases. She credits the adult education creative writing class she took at Brandeis University in 1978 for propelling her into writing fiction.

She began writing fiction in 1979, and her first short story, "Catering", was published in Yankee Magazine. Lipman’s first book, Into Love and Out Again, a collection of short stories, was published by Viking in 1987. She published her first novel, Then She Found Me, in 1990. Lipman graduated from Simmons College where she studied journalism. She lives in western Massachusetts and Manhattan. Her 1998 novel The Inn at Lake Devine, explores Antisemitism and Jewish intermarriage. Lipman received the New England Book award for fiction in 2001. Her novel Then She Found Me was adapted into a 2008 feature film, directed by and starring Helen Hunt, Bette Midler, Colin Firth and Matthew Broderick, a process that took 19 years. Two of her other novels have also been optioned for movies.

Her book of rhyming political tweets, Tweet Land of Liberty: Irreverent Rhymes from the Political Circus was published in August 2012 from Beacon Press. Her essays have appeared in The Washington Post, The Boston Globe, The New York Times and Salon.com. The View from Penthouse B (her 10th novel) and I Can't Complain: (All Too) Personal Essays (Houghton Mifflin Harcourt) were published in 2013. The latter deals in part with the death of her husband at age 60. She was the Elizabeth Drew Professor of Creative Writing at Smith College in 2011-2012. Her poem, "I Bought This Pattern Book Last Spring" appears in the anthology Knitting Yarns: Writers on Knitting, published by W. W. Norton & Company in 2013. She writes a weekly column, "I Might Complain," for Parade.com. Lipman's writing is known for its wit and societal observations.

Her 13th novel Rachel to the Rescue, featuring a character recently sacked from the Trump White House, was published by the UK publisher Lightning Books in November 2020 after Lipman's US publisher initially declined to take it on. Stacy Schiff has called it ‘The Trump book that could only be published abroad’.

In 2022, the Pollard Memorial Library Foundation in Lowell, Massachusetts established an Elinor Lipman award for writing, to honor a book by a Lowell-based writer.

Her 2023 novel Ms. Demeanor was a finalist for the 23rd Thurber Prize for American Humor.

== Teaching ==
Lipman has taught at Simmons, Hampshire and Smith Colleges. For the 2011-2012 academic year she held the Elizabeth Drew Chair in Creative Writing at Smith.

== Personal life ==
Lipman married Robert Austin, a radiologist, and the pair lived in Northampton, Massachusetts, raising their son, Benjamin Lipman Austin (born 1982). In 2009, Austin died from complications associated with frontotemporal dementia. Elinor Lipman now makes her home in New York City.

== Works ==
=== Nonfiction ===
- 2012 Tweet Land of Liberty: Irreverent Rhymes from the Political Circus (ISBN 9780807042434)
- 2013 I Can't Complain: (All Too) Personal Essays (ISBN 9780547576206)

=== Novels ===
- 1990 Then She Found Me (ISBN 0-671-68615-1)
- 1992 The Way Men Act (ISBN 0-671-74841-6)
- 1995 Isabel's Bed (ISBN 0-671-01564-8)
- 1998 The Inn at Lake Devine (ISBN 0-375-70485-X)
- 1999 The Ladies' Man (ISBN 0-375-70731-X)
- 2001 The Dearly Departed (ISBN 0-375-72458-3)
- 2003 The Pursuit of Alice Thrift (ISBN 0-375-72459-1)
- 2006 My Latest Grievance (ISBN 0-618-64465-2)
- 2009 The Family Man (ISBN 0-618-64466-0)
- 2013 The View From Penthouse B (ISBN 0-547-57621-8)
- 2017 On Turpentine Lane (ISBN 0-544-80824-X)
- 2019 Good Riddance (ISBN 0-544-80825-8)
- 2020 Rachel to the Rescue (ISBN 9781785632556)
- 2023 Ms. Demeanor (ISBN 9780358677888)
- 2025 Every Tom, Dick and Harry (ISBN 978-0063433380)

=== Story collections ===
- 1988 Into Love and Out Again (ISBN 0-671-65676-7)
