= The Final Frontier (Mad About You) =

- Mad About You episodes
- Episode nos.: Season 7 Episodes 21/22
- Directed by: Helen Hunt
- Story by: Helen Hunt; Paul Reiser; Victor Levin
- Teleplay by: Paul Reiser; Victor Levin
- Production code: 721–722
- Original air date: May 24, 1999

Guest appearances
- Janeane Garofalo (Mabel); Todd Shinto (Beavis); Lillian Hurst (Phyllis)

Episode chronology
← Previous "The Dirty Little Secret"	Next → "The Kid Leaves"

"The Final Frontier" is the name of the final episode of the American television series Mad About You prior to its 2019 revival. This special double episode serves as the 21st and 22nd episode of the seventh season. It first aired on NBC on May 24, 1999, to an audience of approximately 19.8 million households, in a 45-minute version.

== Plot ==
The finale is based as a flash forward about 22 years into the future. For the first time since she was born in the last episode of season five entitled "The Birth", the Buchmans' only daughter, Mabel, is seen beyond infancy. She becomes a film maker, like her father, and is making an autobiography about herself and her family. As it turns out, the Buchmans were not officially married because the minister who married them was not ordained. Eventually they get officially "re-married" so as to have the same anniversary date.

Another course of events relates to Mabel explaining, through comedic skits, that she turned out to be who she was because she had neurotic parents. During the course of the biopic, Mabel shows how Paul and Jamie separate. However, in the end, during a showing of Mabel's film Stabbing Bob, the rest of the family, including Debbie, Joan and Ira, conspire to have the two of them sit together. They then discover a spark between the two and get back together. At the end, Mabel gives a description of what happened to each character (including the regular supporting casts who appear for the episode) and ends with Paul and Jamie living "happily ever after".

When the show returned in 2019 for season 8, most of the plot of this episode was retconned.

== Production ==
The title of the episode is taken from the last words of the last lyric of the theme song of the show, which is "As we jump into the final frontier!".

Prior to the first airing, Helen Hunt said that the final episode would be "unique and memorable".

This episode ran for 45 minutes at its original broadcast. In the later reruns, the episode was split into two parts.

== Reception ==
The finale drew in 19.8 million viewers at original airing, though the New York Daily News reported it drew in 28 million viewers. The first figure is the household rating (i.e. percentage of households watching), the second figure is total number of viewers.
