= Bill Grundfest =

American TV writer and producer

- Occupations: Television writer and producer
- Known for: Founder of the Comedy Cellar, Golden Globe Award winner

Bill Grundfest is a US television writer and producer. He has won a Golden Globe Award, and has been nominated for an Emmy Award three times.

== Writer and Producer ==
His work as a writer and producer includes:

- Mad About You - for which he served as a story editor, co-producer, and Supervising Producer.
- Award show telecasts, including the Academy Awards, the Emmy Awards, Grammy, People's Choice Awards.
- Sony International recently sent him to Beijing, China numerous times to supervise the adaptation and production of the first U.S. sitcom ("Mad About You") adapted for China.
- That's Life, an hour-long drama series for Paramount Studios, and which aired on CBS TV.
- "Pryor Offenses," a dramatic-comedy special for Showtime TV. Based on characters and material by Richard Pryor, Grundfest is credited as Executive Producer, and shares writing credit with Richard Pryor.
- "The Richard Pryor Comedy Special" for Comedy Central. He is credited as director of this special.
- Campus Ladies, a comedy series following two forty-ish women returning to college where they wreak havoc. He is credited as Executive Producer. It aired on the OXYGEN cable network.
- Exes & Ohs, a dramedy series aired in the US on LOGO and in Canada on Showcase. Its first season was nominated for a GLAAD Award. Grundfest is the Executive Producer.
- We The Jury, a nationally syndicated daily court-reality series wherein the jury was allowed to ask questions in small claims cases, and wherein "secret" jury deliberations made up half of each episode. Grundfest was creator and Executive Producer.
- Missing, a nationally syndicated weekly reality–news series which told the stories of actual missing persons, and asked the viewers for help and information in locating them. It was a co-production of Sand In My Pants, Inc. and Telco Productions and was syndicated by Tribune.

== Comedy ==
Prior to going to Hollywood, Grundfest lived in New York, where he founded The Comedy Cellar, a 150-seat comedy club in Greenwich Village. It opened in 1982 and is still in operation. And prior to that, he was in 1970 a CIT (Counselor-in-Training) at a Jewish camp called Camp Aishel, where he was mercilessly teased by his campers.

Grundfest, a former stand-up comedian himself, showcased then-unknown comedians such as Jon Stewart, Bill Maher, Rita Rudner, Ray Romano, and Dave Atell. Jon Stewart credits Grundfest with discovering him and guiding his early career. Established stars such as Robin Williams and Jerry Seinfeld would "drop in" unannounced to perform.

He also performed on radio, WNBC-66AM, where he hosted his own series ("The Wild Bill Grundfest Show") Saturday and Sunday afternoons (2-7 PM), and was the permanent substitute host for Don Imus and Soupy Sales.

== Corporate Speaking ==
Grundfest has made recent appearances at corporate conferences including multiple appearances at Eric Reis' "Lean Start Up" Conference in San Francisco, and "Funny Bizz" conferences in New York City and San Francisco. His topic is "Whoever Tells The Best Story - Wins", in which attendees create content during his address.

Bill Grundfest created the "Write Like A Pro" writers workshop, a "learn-by-doing, No Theory Allowed" workshop which teaches non-writers and writers to write like professional TV and film writers

== Business Innovation ==
Google recently purchased the Silicon Valley start up for which he was credited as creative director. ("Timeful", a smart calendar app)
