= Enloqueciendo contigo =

- Genre: Sitcom
- Based on: Mad About You by Paul Reiser & Danny Jacobson
- Written by: Joserra Zúñiga; Salvador Suárez Obregón; Paula Rendón
- Directed by: Magaby García; Salvador Suárez Obregón
- Starring: Regina Blandón; Memo Villegas; Ricardo Polanco; Alexis de Anda; Tato Alexander; Daniel García
- Theme music composer: Pascual Reyes
- Opening theme: "Locos de amor"
- Composer: Pascual Reyes
- Country of origin: Mexico
- Original language: Spanish
- No. of seasons: 2
- No. of episodes: 40

Production
- Executive producers: Carlos Quintanilla Sakar; Alejandro García
- Producer: Alfredo Marrón Santander
- Cinematography: Diego Gajardo Schneider
- Editor: Jorge A. Forero
- Production company: Sony Pictures Television

Original release
- Network: Sony Channel
- Release: 19 January 2025 – present

Enloqueciendo contigo is a Mexican sitcom television series based on 1992 American television series Mad About You. The series stars Regina Blandón and Memo Villegas. It premiered on Sony Channel on 19 January 2025. The second season premiered on 25 January 2026.

== Cast ==
- Regina Blandón as Jimena
- Memo Villegas as Pablo
- Ricardo Polanco as Héctor
- Alexis de Anda as Luisa
- Tato Alexander as Fernanda
- Daniel García as Miguel

== Production ==
On 24 May 2024, Regina Blandón and Memo Villegas were announced to star in the Mexican adaptation of American sitcom Mad About You. Filming began in July 2024.

== Episodes ==
Series	Episodes	Originally released	
Series	Episodes	First released	Last released
1	20	19 January 2025	21 September 2025
2	20	25 January 2026	7 June 2026

=== Season 1 (2025) ===
No. overall	No. in season	Title	Original release date
1	1	"Improvisaciones románticas"	19 January 2025
2	2	"Vecinos de infierno"	26 January 2025
3	3	"El sofá"	2 February 2025
4	4	"Feliz Día de las Madres"	9 February 2025
5	5	"Conocí a alguien"	16 February 2025
6	6	"Domingo sin salir"	23 February 2025
7	7	"La chica encubierta"	2 March 2025
8	8	"Pablo está muerto"	9 March 2025
9	9	"Feliz Día de San Valentín"	16 March 2025
10	10	"Hasta que los secretos nos separen"	23 March 2025
11	11	"Este amor es azul"	20 July 2025
12	12	"Mis amores pasados"	27 July 2025
13	13	"Fotos y recuerdos"	3 August 2025
14	14	"Todos en familia"	10 August 2025
15	15	"El pintor"	17 August 2025
16	16	"Estoy tan feliz por ti"	24 August 2025
17	17	"Visita Guadalajara"	31 August 2025
18	18	"Una oferta que no podrás rechazar"	7 September 2025
19	19	"¡Corre!"	14 September 2025
20	20	"Feliz aniversario"	21 September 2025

=== Season 2 (2026) ===
No. overall	No. in season	Title	Original release date
21	1	"Sin paracaídas"	25 January 2026
22	2	"Juegos de perritos"	1 February 2026
23	3	"Tu mamá nos va a oír"	8 February 2026
24	4	"Bing Bang Boom"	15 February 2026
25	5	"Casada con el trabajo"	22 February 2026
26	6	"Emprendedora"	1 March 2026
27	7	"Este niño no es mío"	8 March 2026
28	8	"Selección natural"	15 March 2026
29	9	"Sorpresa"	22 March 2026
30	10	"Par de corazones"	29 March 2026
31	11	"Corte y queda"	5 April 2026
32	12	"Caina y Abela"	12 April 2026
33	13	"La próxima semana a la misma hora"	19 April 2026
34	14	"Que pase el desgraciado"	26 April 2026
35	15	"Sex Tape"	3 May 2026
36	16	"Cartas de amor"	10 May 2026
37	17	"Los últimos camarones"	17 May 2026
38	18	"Los caminos de la vida"	24 May 2026
39	19	"Karma"	31 May 2026
40	20	"El niño de compromiso"	7 June 2026

== Release ==
The series premiered on Sony Channel on 19 January 2025. In April 2025, Disney+ announced it had acquired the rights to stream the series in Latin American, with the entire first season streaming on 20 July 2025. The second season premiered on 25 January 2026, with all twenty second-season episodes releasing on Disney+ that same day.
