= Ride (2014 film) =

- Theatrical release poster
- Directed by: Helen Hunt
- Written by: Helen Hunt
- Produced by: Greg Little; Helen Hunt; Lizzie Friedman; Matthew Carnahan; Moon Blauner
- Starring: Helen Hunt; Luke Wilson; Brenton Thwaites; David Zayas
- Cinematography: Jas Shelton
- Edited by: William Yeh
- Music by: Julian Wass
- Production company: Sandbar Pictures
- Distributed by: Screen Media Films
- Release dates: November 8, 2014 (AFM); May 1, 2015 (United States)
- Running time: 93 minutes
- Country: United States
- Language: English
- Box office: $6,489

Ride is a 2014 American drama film written and directed by Helen Hunt. The film stars Hunt, Luke Wilson, Brenton Thwaites and Leonor Varela. A mother travels cross-country to California to be with her son after he decides to drop out of school and become a surfer.

The film had a limited release in theaters and was released on video on demand beginning on May 1, 2015 by Screen Media Films.

== Plot ==
An editor for a publisher in NYC, single mother Jackie Durning has been on top of her son Angelo his whole life. From a very young age, she has been grooming him to become a writer. He gets into NYU to major in writing, but he lacks self-confidence as she's always been his biggest critic and editor.

Angelo travels cross-country to California to spend some time with his father Peter's family in the summer before starting classes. Although Jackie had asked him to call when he landed, it takes her five days to reach him. When she stops by Angelo's NYU dorm room to drop off some things, she's told he's dropped out.

Jackie immediately goes home to pack a bag and flies to California. Not having told anyone, she has her driver Ramon take her to outside of Peter's. They stay watching all night until dawn, when Angelo comes out with a surfboard. They follow him to a beach, where they see he's become a surfer.

As Jackie hasn't called for a while, Angelo calls her but she lets it go to voicemail. He mentions an e-mail he'd sent her, explaining he wants to experience life far from NYC. As Jackie insists Ramon follow so closely, they accidentally touch bumpers. Discovering his mother is following him, Angelo confronts her and tells her the NYC life doesn't interest him, but Santa Monica does.

Jackie insists she can figure out how to surf, regardless of Ramon's scepticism. Ian, a nearby surfer, comes when Ramon insists she's having difficulty. Jackie hires Ian to teach her, eventually realizing she needs instruction.

After their second day of lessons, Jackie and Ian sleep together. The next day at the beach, when they come across Angelo and his surfing friends, she, Ian and Ramon follow them to an outside cafe. Mother and son address each other by their first names, and the younger group soon leaves. As Angelo accidentally drops a bag of weed, Jackie decides to try it again. Becoming very giggly, she confesses that she got fired.

That evening, Jackie shows up at Peter's. She meets his pregnant second wife and their young daughter. Going up to Angelo's room, she interrupts him with a female friend. Angelo confronts Jackie, telling her she's smothered him ever since his brother's accidental death and he wants no more of it.

The next day, Jackie and Ian agree to see each other, but she flies back to NYC first. She gets her second son's ashes to disperse in the ocean. A few days later, on Angelo's birthday, Jackie gets him to meet her at the beach so he can see her surf.

Jackie announces that she's moving to LA and will no longer smother him. In turn Angelo announces he's gotten his spot back at NYU, after sending off his surfing friends who are heading to college and contemplating the older writer he'd met. Mother and son surf together before they each go on their own way.

== Cast ==
- Helen Hunt as Jackie
- Luke Wilson as Ian
- Brenton Thwaites as Angelo
- Leonor Varela as Danielle
- David Zayas as Ramon
- Richard Kind as Boss
- Mike White as Roger
- Jay Huguley as Co-Worker
- Callum Keith Rennie as Tim
- Danielle Lauder as Karen

== Production ==
On July 30, 2013, Deadline reported that Helen Hunt would star, direct and produce her script of a surf film Ride. She produced the film with Greg Little and Lizzie Friedman. Upon closing of the distribution rights with Screen Media Films, it was announced that the film would be dedicated to her father and the film's surf-photographer Sonny Miller after his death in 2014. In 2015, Hunt memorialised her friend and their experiences filming the surfing scenes in, "Sonny Miller's Lesson for Us All: 'Nature Dictates'", for The Huffington Post.

=== Filming ===
The shooting of the film Ride began on August 5, 2013, at Venice Beach in Los Angeles.

== Release ==
In September 2014, it was announced Screen Media Films had acquired distribution rights for the film with a planned 2015 release. The film had its world premiere at the AFM on November 8, 2014. The film also premiered at the San Francisco International Film Festival on April 25, 2015. The film was released in the United States in a limited release and through video on demand on May 1, 2015.

== Reception ==
Ride received mixed reviews from critics. As of June 2020, the film holds a 50% approval rating on Rotten Tomatoes, based on 32 reviews with an average score of 5.97/10. The site's critical consensus reads, "Ride reaffirms Helen Hunt's immense acting talent -- but suggests that she still needs time to develop as a director." On Metacritic, the film has a score of 48 out of 100, based on 16 critics, indicating "mixed or average reviews".
