= Quarterback Princess =

1983 American TV sports drama film by Noel Black

- Genre: Drama; Sport
- Written by: Rod Browning
- Directed by: Noel Black
- Starring: Helen Hunt; Don Murray; Barbara Babcock; Dana Elcar
- Music by: James Di Pasquale
- Country of origin: United States
- Original language: English

Production
- Producers: Gary Goodman; Barry Rosen
- Production location: McMinnville, Oregon
- Cinematography: Isidore Mankofsky
- Editor: Tom Stevens
- Running time: 96 minutes
- Production company: CBS Entertainment Production

Original release
- Network: CBS
- Release: December 3, 1983

Quarterback Princess is a 1983 American made-for-television fact-based sports drama film by 20th Century Fox that chronicles the courage and determination of a teenage girl who struggles against sexism and fights to play on her high school football team. It was filmed primarily in McMinnville, Oregon. Because of legal issues, various signs were modified to say "Minnville."

== Plot summary ==
Tami Maida wants to play quarterback for the high school football team. However, because she is a girl, everyone from the coach to her next door neighbor is against her. Tami goes out to prove that not only can she play football but she can win the conference championship.

Not only does Tami succeed, she also becomes the homecoming princess.

== Cast ==
- Helen Hunt as Tami Maida
- Don Murray as Ralph Maida
- Barbara Babcock as Judy Maida
- Dana Elcar as Mr. Caine
- John Stockwell as Scott Massey
- Daphne Zuniga as Kim Maida
- Mary-Robin Redd as Saleswoman
- Joshua Cadman as Brian
- Severn Darden as Mr. Hobart
- Carmen Argenziano as Ed Ainsworth
- Nancy Parsons as Mrs. Klosterman
- Tim Robbins as Marvin
- Jonna Lee as Tiffany

== See also ==
- List of American football films
