= Helen Hunt =

American actress (born 1963)

- Hunt at GalaxyCon Des Moines in 2026
- Born: Helen Elizabeth Hunt; June 15, 1963 (age 63); Culver City, California, U.S.
- Occupation: Actress
- Years active: 1973–present
- Works: Full list
- Spouse: Hank Azaria (m. 1999; div. 2000)
- Partner(s): Matthew Carnahan (2001–2017); Jeffrey Nordling (1988; since 2022)
- Children: 1
- Father: Gordon Hunt
- Relatives: Peter H. Hunt (uncle)
- Awards: Full list

Helen Elizabeth Hunt (born June 15, 1963) is an American actress. Her accolades include an Academy Award, four Primetime Emmy Awards, and four Golden Globe Awards.

Hunt rose to fame portraying newlywed Jamie Buchman in the sitcom Mad About You (1992–1999), which earned her three Golden Globe Awards for Best Actress and four Primetime Emmy Awards for Lead Actress. Hunt won the Academy Award for Best Actress for starring as a single mother in the romantic comedy film As Good as It Gets (1997), and she established a film career by starring in Twister (1996), Cast Away (2000), What Women Want (2000), and Pay It Forward (2000).

Hunt made her directorial film debut with Then She Found Me (2007). For her portrayal of Cheryl Cohen-Greene in The Sessions (2012), she gained a nomination for the Academy Award for Best Supporting Actress. Her other notable films include Bobby (2006), Soul Surfer (2011), and The Miracle Season (2018), and she has directed the film Ride (2014), and episodes of television series, including House of Lies in 2016, This Is Us in 2016, Feud: Bette and Joan in 2017, American Housewife in 2018, and the premiere episode of the Mad About You revival in 2019.

== Early life ==
Hunt was born in Culver City, California. Her mother, Jane Elizabeth (née Novis), worked as a photographer, and her father, Gordon Hunt, was a film, voice, and stage director and acting coach. Her uncle, Peter H. Hunt, was also a director. Her maternal grandmother, Dorothy (née Anderson) Fries, was a voice coach. Hunt's paternal grandmother was from a German-Jewish family, while Hunt's other grandparents were of English descent (her maternal grandfather was born in England), with a Methodist religious background.

When she was three, Hunt's family moved to New York City, where her father directed theatre and Hunt attended plays as a child several times a week. Hunt graduated from Providence High School in Burbank, California. She also studied ballet, and briefly attended the University of California, Los Angeles.

== Career ==
=== 1976–1989: Child actress and early work ===
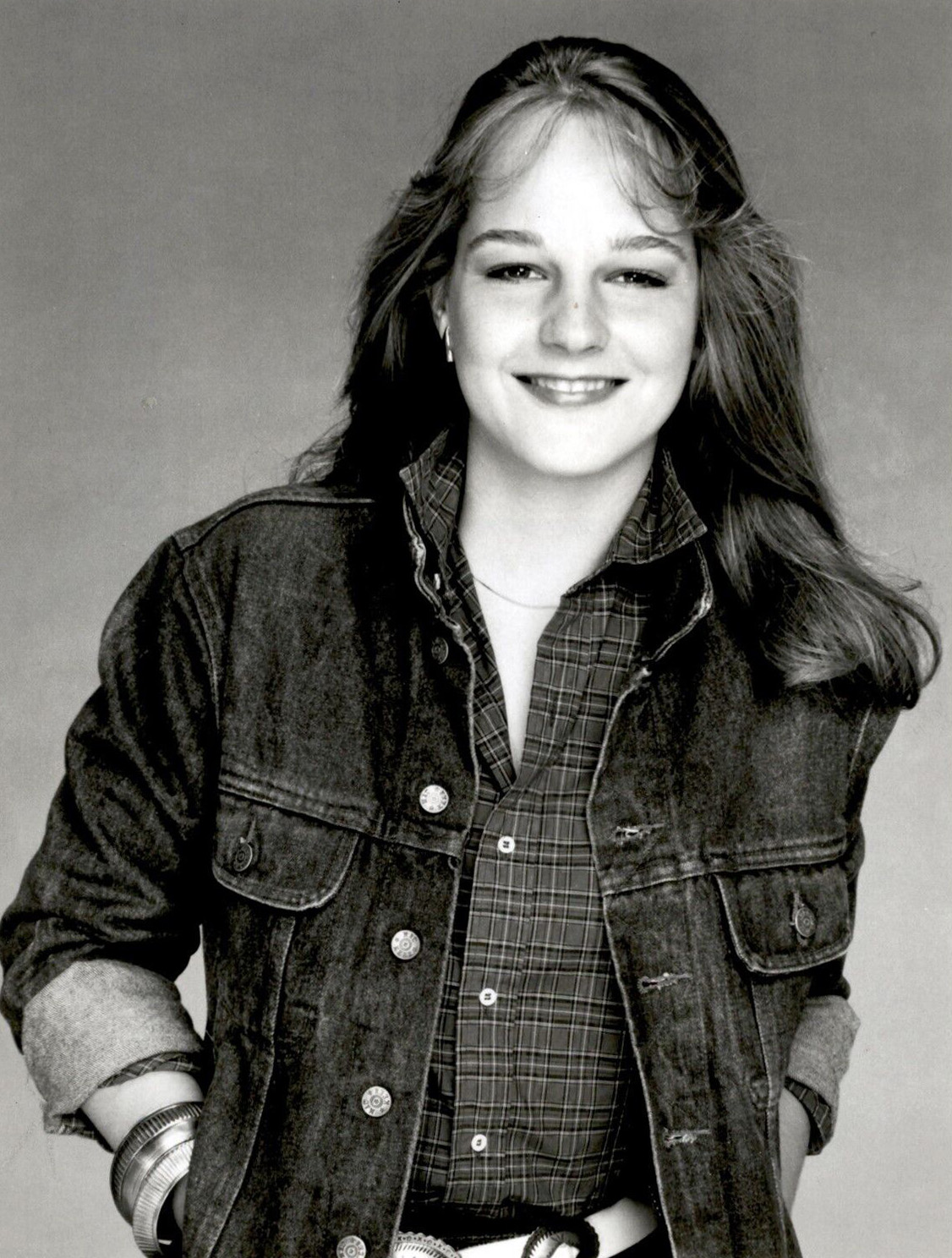
Hunt as Lisa in It Takes Two, 1982

Hunt began working as a child actress in the 1970s. Her early roles included an appearance on season 2, episode 3 of TV series Family (first aired Oct 26, 1976), playing Robin Trask, a classmate of Kristy McNichol's. She also had an appearance as Murray Slaughter's daughter on The Mary Tyler Moore Show in the 1977 episode “Murray Ghosts for Ted”, as the daughter of George Segal's main character in Rollercoaster (1977), alongside Lindsay Wagner in an episode of The Bionic Woman, an appearance in an episode of Ark II called "Omega", and a regular role in the television series The Swiss Family Robinson. She appeared as a marijuana-smoking classmate on an episode of The Facts of Life. In 1982, Hunt played a young woman who, while on PCP, jumps out of a second-story window, in a made-for-television film called Desperate Lives (a scene which she mocked during a Saturday Night Live monologue in 1994), and she was cast on the ABC sitcom It Takes Two, which lasted only one season. In 1983, she starred in Bill: On His Own, with Mickey Rooney and played Tami Maida in the fact-based production Quarterback Princess; both were made-for-television films. She also had a recurring role on St. Elsewhere as Clancy Williams, the girlfriend of Jack "Boomer" Morrison (David Morse), and made a notable guest appearance as a cancer-stricken mother-to-be in a two-part episode of Highway to Heaven.

By the mid and late 1980s, Hunt had begun appearing in studio films aimed at a teenage audience. Her first major film role was that of a punk rock girl in the sci-fi film Trancers (1984). She played the friend of an army brat in the comedy Girls Just Want to Have Fun (1985), with Sarah Jessica Parker and Shannen Doherty, and appeared as the daughter of a woman on the verge of divorce in Francis Ford Coppola's Peggy Sue Got Married (1986), alongside Kathleen Turner. In 1987, Hunt starred with Matthew Broderick in Project X, as a graduate student assigned to care for chimpanzees used in a secret Air Force project. In 1988, she appeared in Stealing Home, as Hope Wyatt, the sister of Billy Wyatt, played by Mark Harmon and a cast featuring Jodie Foster and Harold Ramis. Next of Kin (1989) featured her as the pregnant wife of a respectable lawman, opposite Patrick Swayze and Liam Neeson.

=== 1990–1999: Mad About You and film roles ===
In 1990, Hunt appeared with Tracey Ullman and Morgan Freeman in a Wild West version of The Taming of the Shrew at the Delacorte Theater in Central Park. In 1991, Hunt starred in Trancers II, the direct-to-video sequel to Trancers (1984), and played the lead female role in the drama My Life and Times, which only aired for 6 episodes. In 1992, she appeared in the drama The Waterdance as a married woman having an affair with a writer; in the romantic comedy Only You, as a travel agent and the love interest of a doll's house designer; in the mockumentary Bob Roberts, as Rose Pondell, a field reporter at WLNO; and in Mr. Saturday Night, as a young agent named Annie Well. Also in 1992, Hunt returned for her third and final outing as Lena in Trancers III, which was among her five film releases that year.

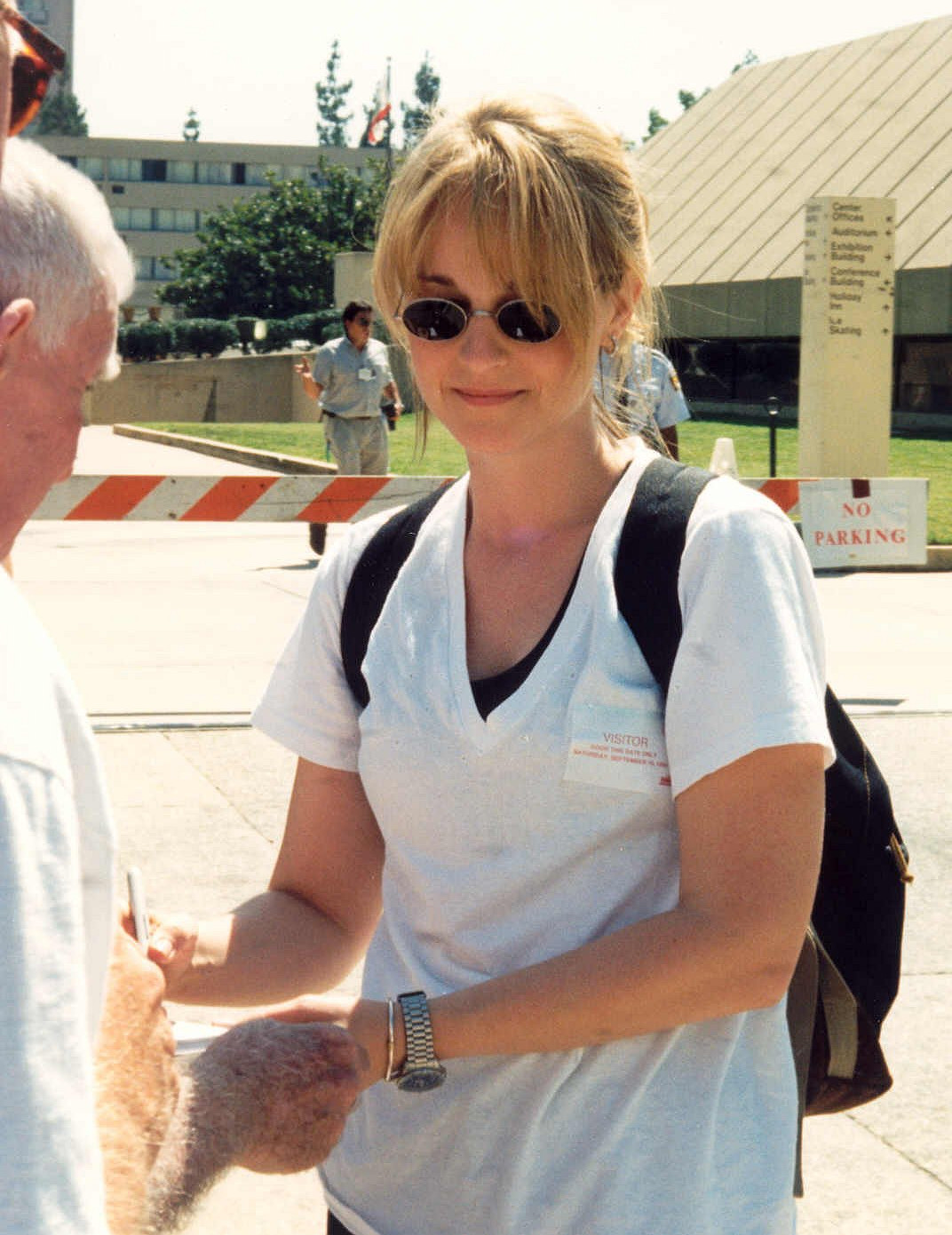
Hunt signs autographs for fans outside the 1994 Emmy Awards rehearsal.

Hunt came to prominence in North America with the sitcom Mad About You (1992–99), in which she starred opposite Paul Reiser as a public relations specialist and one half of a couple in NYC. She went on to win Emmy Awards for her performances in 1996, 1997, 1998, and 1999. For the show's final season, Reiser and Hunt received $1 million ($1.9 million today) per episode. She directed several episodes of Mad About You, including the series finale.

In 1995, Hunt played the wife of an ex-con living in Queens, alongside Nicolas Cage, in Kiss of Death, a very loosely based remake of the 1947 film noir classic of the same name. In the disaster action film Twister (1996), Hunt starred with Bill Paxton as storm chasers researching tornadoes. Both actors were temporarily blinded by bright electronic lamps halfway through filming, and needed hepatitis shots after shooting in a particularly unsanitary ditch. Twister was the second-highest-grossing film of 1996, behind Independence Day. The film sold an estimated 54,688,100 tickets in the US. It made US$494.5 million around the globe.

Hunt went on to win the Academy Award for Best Actress in the romantic comedy As Good as It Gets (1997), in which she took on the role of a waitress and single mother who finds herself falling in love with a misanthropic, obsessive-compulsive romance novelist, played by Jack Nicholson. Hunt and Nicholson got along well during the filming, and they connected immediately: "It wasn't even what we said", Hunt added. "It was just some frequency we both could tune into that was very, very compatible." Author and screenwriter Andrew Horton described their on-screen relationship as being like "fire and ice, oil and water—seemingly complete opposites". Nonetheless, Hunt was Nicholson's perfect counterpart, and delivered "a simply stunning performance", wrote critic Louise Keller. The film was a tremendous box office success, grossing US$314 million worldwide. In 1998, she played the love interest of Moe Szyslak on The Simpsons episode "Dumbbell Indemnity", and played Viola in Shakespeare's Twelfth Night, at Lincoln Center in New York.

=== 2000–2012: Career fluctuations ===
Two of Hunt's four film releases in 2000—the comedy Dr. T & the Women and the drama Pay It Forward—were both released in October. While the first featured her as one of the women that encompasses the everyday life of a wealthy gynecologist, opposite Richard Gere, the second showcased her as the love interest of a physically and emotionally scarred grade school teacher, played by Kevin Spacey. Critic Roger Ebert highlighted her performance in Pay It Forward, despite finding the film itself to be "too emotionally manipulative". Her other two 2000 films—the Nancy Meyers' directed romantic comedy What Women Want, and the Robert Zemeckis' directed survival drama Cast Away—were released in December, to outstanding box office receipts. In What Women Want, Hunt starred with Mel Gibson as the co-worker and love interest of a Chicago executive, and in Cast Away, she portrayed the long-term girlfriend of a FedEx employee marooned on an uninhabited island, played by Tom Hanks.

Hunt starred in Woody Allen's The Curse of the Jade Scorpion (2001), as an efficiency expert hypnotized by a crooked hypnotist into stealing jewels. Despite the film's limited success, Roger Ebert asserted: "Hunt in particular has fun with a wisecracking dame role that owes something, perhaps, to Rosalind Russell in His Girl Friday." In 2003, Hunt returned to Broadway in Yasmina Reza's Life x 3, and in 2004, she starred in the drama A Good Woman, as a femme fatale in 1930s NYC. AV Club, in its review for the latter, remarked: "Helen Hunt looks embarrassingly out of place trying to play an infamous seductress". She played a socialite, as part of an ensemble cast, in Emilio Estevez's drama Bobby (2006), about the hours leading up to the Robert F. Kennedy assassination. As a member of the cast, she was nominated for the Screen Actors Guild Award and the Hollywood Film Festival Award for Best Ensemble Cast, winning for the latter.

Hunt made her feature film directorial debut in Then She Found Me (2007), in which she also starred as a 39-year-old Brooklyn elementary school teacher, who after many years is contacted by the flamboyant host of a local talk show, played by Bette Midler, who introduces herself as her biological mother. After first reading Elinor Lipman's novel, Hunt tried to interest numerous studios in the material, and her unsuccessful efforts led her to begin writing the screenplay and raising funds to produce it herself. Upon its release, Ruthe Stein of the San Francisco Chronicle observed, "You would think that frontloading Then She Found Me with so much plot would make it play like a soap opera. But Hunt saves the movie from this fate in two ways. First she turns in a touchingly real performance, the best of her big-screen career. Forget that As Good as It Gets won her an Oscar. She's eons better and more realistic in this one [...] By directing Then She Found Me, Helen becomes its savior as well [...] Hunt knows when to rein in the Divine Miss M instead of allowing her to go into full Kabuki mode. [She] also coaxes pitch-perfect performances from Broderick and Firth."

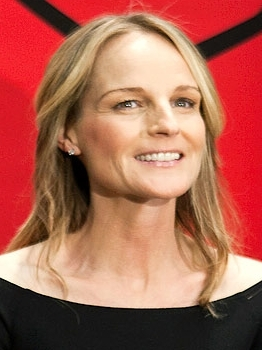
Hunt in 2011

Hunt starred in the dramedy Every Day (2010), as one half of a married couple pulled apart by increasing responsibilities. According to Los Angeles Times, the film "comes as a reminder of [Hunt's] talent for understatement, and a wish to see more of her". In the biographical drama Soul Surfer (2011), she played the mother of the Hawaiian-born champion surfer Bethany Hamilton, on whose life the film was based. Her first wide release since 2001's The Curse of the Jade Scorpion, Soul Surfer made US$47.1 million internationally.

Hunt starred as sex surrogate Cheryl Cohen-Greene in The Sessions (2012), alongside John Hawkes and William H. Macy. The role required Hunt to perform multiple scenes of full-frontal nudity, on which she further said: "Being naked was challenging, but even more than that was the vulnerability. I felt vulnerable because I was naked. I felt vulnerable because we were having such a vulnerable moment in this character's life. This was a real journey that someone had gone on, and I wanted to do right by that." Her performance was acclaimed by critics and earned her several award nominations, including an Oscar nomination for Best Supporting Actress. Todd McCarthy of The Hollywood Reporter wrote: "Hunt's performance may be physically bold but is equally marked by its maturity and composure."

=== 2013–present: Focus on directing ===
Hunt played research geneticist Mary-Claire King in the independent drama Decoding Annie Parker (2013), which was released to a mixed critical response. She wrote and directed the drama Ride (2014), in which she also starred as a mother who travels cross-country to California to be with her son after he decides to drop out of school and become a surfer. Rotten Tomatoes' critical consensus read: "Ride reaffirms Helen Hunt's immense acting talent—but suggests that she still needs time to develop as a director."

In The Miracle Season (2018), based on the true story of the Iowa City West High School volleyball team, Hunt played Kathy Bresnahan, a volleyball coach. In 2019, Hunt appeared in the BBC series World on Fire as journalist Nancy Campbell, a character inspired by real-life war correspondent Clare Hollingworth, and reprised the role of Jamie Buchman in the Mad About You revival, which premiered in the form of a limited series, by Spectrum Originals. In December 2018, Hunt was a guest narrator at Disney's Candlelight Processional at Walt Disney World. In 2020, Hunt appeared in the crime drama film The Night Clerk, alongside Tye Sheridan. Hunt appeared in a leading role in the 2021-2023 Starz series Blindspotting, created by Daveed Diggs and Rafael Casal and based on their 2018 film of the same name. In September 2022, she starred in the European premiere of Eureka Day at The Old Vic theatre in London.

In 2024, she was featured in the HBO comedy drama Hacks, guest starring as a network executive in both Season 3 and 4.

== Personal life ==
Hunt dated actor Jeffrey Nordling in 1988. In 1994, Hunt started dating actor Hank Azaria. They married in 1999, and divorced 17 months later. In 2001, Hunt began a relationship with producer Matthew Carnahan. They had a daughter. The couple split in August 2017. She rekindled her relationship with Nordling in 2022.

Hunt was one of the demonstrators at the 2017 Women's March held on January 21 in Los Angeles, California.
