= Mad About You =

American television sitcom (1992–1999, 2019)

- Genre: Sitcom
- Created by: Paul Reiser; Danny Jacobson
- Developed by: Peter Tolan (2019 revival)
- Starring: Paul Reiser; Helen Hunt; Anne Ramsay; Tommy Hinkley; Leila Kenzle; John Pankow; Richard Kind; Cynthia Harris; Louis Zorich; Abby Quinn
- Theme music composer: Paul Reiser; Don Was
- Opening theme: "Final Frontier" by Andrew Gold
- Composer: David Kitay
- Country of origin: United States
- Original language: English
- No. of seasons: 8
- No. of episodes: 176 (list of episodes)

Production
- Executive producers: Danny Jacobson; Paul Reiser; Victor Levin; Larry Charles; Jeffrey Lane; Helen Hunt; Peter Tolan (2019); Brian Volk-Weiss (2019); Matt Ochacher (2019); Michael Pelmont (2019)
- Camera setup: Multi-camera
- Running time: 21–22 minutes; 23–26 minutes (revival)
- Production companies: In Front Productions (1992–1999); The Cloudland Company (2019); Nuance Productions; Comedy Dynamics (2019); TriStar Television (1992–1999); Sony Pictures Television (2019); Spectrum Originals (2019)

Original release
- Network: NBC
- Release: September 23, 1992 – May 24, 1999
- Network: Spectrum
- Release: November 20 – December 18, 2019

Related
- Friends; Mad About You (Chinese series); Loco por vos (Argentine remake); Enloqueciendo contigo (Mexican remake)

Mad About You is an American television sitcom starring Paul Reiser and Helen Hunt as a married couple in New York City as they navigate life together. In later seasons, the couple has a daughter.

It initially aired on NBC from September 23, 1992, to May 24, 1999, winning numerous awards including four Golden Globe Awards and twelve Primetime Emmy Awards. In its final season, the show was dropped from its primetime slot, leading to a sharp decrease in viewership, and subsequently cancelled.

On March 6, 2019, a limited season 8 revival was picked up by Spectrum Originals for 12 episodes. Reiser and Hunt reprised their roles. The revival showed the couple as new empty nesters whose daughter was starting college at NYU. The events of the original series' finale, which showed the events of the next twenty years of the couple's lives, were retconned for the revival. Several foreign-language remakes have been produced, including for China, for Argentina, and for Mexico.

== Plot ==
The series focuses mainly on newlyweds Paul Buchman, a documentary filmmaker, and Jamie Stemple Buchman, a public relations specialist, as they deal with everything from humorous daily minutiae to major struggles. Near the end of the show's run, they have a baby daughter, whom they name Mabel. They live in Greenwich Village in Lower Manhattan. The 2019 limited series focuses on Paul and Jamie as empty nesters as Mabel starts college at New York University, five blocks away.

== Production and scheduling ==
For its original run, Mad About You aired new episodes on six of the seven nights of the week. The show's first season initially aired on Wednesday nights on NBC after the hit sitcom Seinfeld until mid-season, when it was moved to Saturdays after Empty Nest. When the first season ended, the show was moved to Thursdays at 8 p.m. to kick off NBC's inaugural season of the most-known comedy block Must See TV, spending on that timeslot for its next two seasons, causing a increase in ratings, ending inside the top-20 for its third season.

When Friends took over the slot to lead NBC's Thursday lineup, Mad About You was moved to another night of Must See TV on Sundays for its fourth season, where ratings dipped considerably. It bounced back when the show was moved again to another night of Must See TV on Tuesdays, leading once again the block at 8:00 p.m.

Helen Hunt and Paul Reiser were paid $1 million per episode for the last season (with their contracts calling for them to be paid equally). However, ratings fell sharply that year as the series was shuffled away from its Tuesday slot to prop up a fledgling Monday night line-up of comedies on NBC.

The show's theme song, "Final Frontier", was composed by Reiser and Don Was. It was originally performed by Andrew Gold, with a later version covered by Anita Baker, and finally Lyle Lovett and Kecia Lewis, who both had minor acting roles in the series.

Exterior views of buildings were filmed in Manhattan. Paul and Jamie's New York City Apartment was located at 5th Avenue and 12th Street. The Old Town Bar and Restaurant on 45 E. 18th Street was used for the fictional Riff's Restaurant in the series.

=== Revival ===
In April 2018, it was announced that Sony Pictures Television would revive the show with the two lead actors reprising their roles, though Reiser expressed doubt about it in July 2018. In September 2018, Reiser stated that the revival was still on the table, but that "the studio needs to figure out if they know how to do it."

On March 6, 2019, the series was revived for an eighth season by Spectrum Originals, described as a 12-episode limited series, with Reiser and Hunt confirmed to reprise their roles. On September 5, 2019, it was announced that the first six episodes of the revival would premiere on November 20, 2019, and another six episodes would be released on December 18, 2019. The series was available in a traditional manner in Canada, with its episodes having aired on the CTV Comedy Channel.

Many of the main and recurring cast members reprised their roles for the revival, which ignored the events of the season 7 finale (a flash-forward story that told how the Buchmans would fare over the next 20+ years). The most notable former main cast member not to reprise her role was Leila Kenzle, who played Jamie's best friend, Fran Devanow. Kenzle retired from acting in 2003 and became a psychotherapist. Fran's husband, Mark, does return in the revival, but the character is now remarried.

== Cast and characters ==
=== Original run (1992–1999) ===
==== Main ====
- Paul Reiser as Paul Buchman, a filmmaker. After attending the New York University Film School, he struggled for recognition before finally succeeding in filmmaking in New York City. He and his family reside near Union Square, on lower Fifth Avenue.
- Helen Hunt as Jamie Buchman (née Stemple), the younger daughter of Gus and Theresa Stemple. She works in public relations.
- Maui as Murray, the Buchmans' dog. Twice voted the most popular dog by the readers of TV Guide. Maui was originally found in a Castaic, California, animal shelter by noted Hollywood animal trainer Boone Narr. Maui weighed 58 pounds and was primarily trained by Betty Linn. His first assignments came in TV commercials and as the backup for the top dog in the feature film Bingo.
- Anne Ramsay as Lisa Stemple (seasons 1–5; recurring season 7), Jamie's older sister. Though billed in the opening credits of every episode of seasons 1 through 5, the character appeared less frequently over time, and was in only 22 of the 48 episodes produced in seasons 4 and 5. Anne Ramsay left the show entirely in season 6, but returned for recurring appearances in season 7.
- Leila Kenzle as Fran Devanow (seasons 1–6; guest season 7), Jamie's best friend.
- Richard Kind as Dr. Mark Devanow (season 1; recurring seasons 2–5 & 7), Fran's melodramatic ex-husband, with whom she is on good terms.
- John Pankow as Ira Buchman (recurring season 1; seasons 2–7), Paul's cousin. He first appears in the episode "The Wedding Affair."
- Cynthia Harris as Sylvia Buchman (guest seasons 1–2; recurring seasons 3–5; seasons 6–7), Paul's Mother.
- Louis Zorich as Burt Buchman (guest seasons 1–2; recurring seasons 3–5; seasons 6–7), Paul's father. Burt runs a sporting goods store – until he passes it on to Ira upon retirement. His signature line in the show occurs whenever he visits Paul and Jamie's apartment, exclaiming at the door, "It's me, Burt! Burt Buchman—your father!"
- Alyssa and Justin Baric (twins) as Mabel Buchman, Paul and Jamie's daughter. She was finally named when Jamie's overbearing mother proclaimed that "Mothers Always Bring Extra Love", an homage to The Dick Van Dyke Show where Rob and Laura explain Ritchie's middle name. Alyssa and Justin Baric played Mabel from the beginning of season six when Mabel was brought home from the hospital ("Coming Home"). They continued to play the role of Mabel for numerous episodes. Carter and Madison Gale play the role at a later time. In the season six episode "Letters to Mabel," an 18-year-old Mabel is played by Meredith Bishop. In the series finale, a teen Mabel is played by Cara DeLizia, and an adult Mabel is played by Janeane Garofalo.

==== Recurring roles and guest stars ====
- Jerry Lewis as Freddie Statler, an eccentric billionaire who hires Paul (1 episode)
- Bradley White as Burtkus, Jaime's superior at her job at City Hall (2 episodes)
- Jerry Adler as Mr. Wicker, the apartment building superintendent (10 episodes)
- Hank Azaria as Nat Ostertag, Jamie and Paul's dog walker (15 episodes)
- Robin Bartlett (29 episodes) and Talia Balsam (1 episode) as Debbie Buchman, Paul's sister.
- Patrick Bristow as Troy, Jamie's scheming office underling (5 episodes)
- Mel Brooks as Uncle Phil, Paul's uncle (4 episodes)
- Carol Burnett (10 episodes) and Penny Fuller (4 episodes) and Nancy Dussault (1 episode) as Theresa Stemple, Jamie's mother.
- Mo Gaffney as Dr. Sheila Kleinman, Jamie and Paul's therapist (13 episodes)
- Jeff Garlin as Marvin, Ira's employee and semi-pro wrestler (13 episodes)
- Judy Geeson as Maggie Conway, British neighbor across the hall (32 episodes)
- Tommy Hinkley as Jay Selby, Paul's college friend (13 episodes, season 1 only). The disappearance of Selby is never explained, a fact referred to in season 5, episode 21 ("Guardianhood")
- Lisa Kudrow as Ursula Buffay, absent-minded waitress at Riff's (24 episodes). The character also appeared in the sitcom Friends (1994–2004), in which Phoebe, a co-lead character played by Kudrow, was written as Ursula's twin sister.
- Cyndi Lauper as Marianne Lugasso, Ira's on and off girlfriend/ex-wife (5 episodes)
- Lyle Lovett (2 episodes)
- Gates McFadden as Allison Rourke, Paul Buchman's boss (4 episodes)
- Larry Miller as Lou Bonaparte (5 episodes)
- Carroll O'Connor (4 episodes) and John Karlen (3 episodes) and Paul Dooley (1 episode) as Gus Stemple, Jamie's father
- George O. Petrie as Sid, Paul's film editor colleague (10 episodes)
- Suzie Plakson as Dr. Joan Golfinos, Debbie Buchman's life partner (and Jamie's Ob/Gyn for a while) (18 episodes)
- Alan Ruck (4 episodes) and Harry Groener (4 episodes) as Lance Brockwell
- Eric Stoltz as Alan Tofsky, Jamie's ex-boyfriend (6 episodes)
- Paxton Whitehead as Maggie's first and third husband Hal (9 episodes)
- Jim Piddock as Maggie's second husband Hal (7 episodes)
- Steven Wright as Warren Mermelman (5 episodes)
- Meg Wyllie as aunt Lolly Stemple (4 episodes)
- Scott Atkinson as Doug the Handyman (season 5, episode 12: "The Handyman")

==== Other notable guest stars ====
- Andre Agassi (season 2, episode 15)
- Ed Asner (2 episodes)
- John Astin (season 2, episode 23)
- Kevin Bacon (season 5, episode 7)
- Lewis Black (season 6, episode 7)
- Christie Brinkley (season 2, episode 15)
- Garth Brooks (season 2, episode 23)
- Michael Buffer (season 7, episode 17)
- Steve Buscemi (season 1, episode 7)
- Sid Caesar (season 5, episode 15)
- James Cameron (season 6, episode 23)
- Dan Castellaneta (season 7, episode 10)
- William Christopher (season 7, episode 2)
- Tim Conway (season 7, episodes 21–22)
- Ellen DeGeneres (season 6, episode 23)
- Paul Dooley (season 1, episode 5)
- Nancy Dussault (season 1, episode 5)
- Patrick Ewing (season 3, episode 20)
- Jamie Farr (season 7, episode 16)
- Barbara Feldon (season 1, episode 20)
- Janeane Garofalo (season 7, episodes 21–22)
- Brad Garrett (season 4, episode 18)
- Marita Geraghty (season 3, episode 10)
- Steven Gilborn (Season 5 episode 13)
- Rudolph "Rudy" Giuliani (season 3, episode 10)
- Al Gore (season 6, episode 10)
- Kerri Green (season 1, episode 4)
- Seth Green (season 5, episode 21)
- Billy Joel (season 7, episode 15)
- Bruno Kirby (season 5, episode 9)
- Robert Klein (season 7, episode 9)
- Nathan Lane (season 6, episode 11)
- Phil Leeds (season 1, episode 6)
- Eugene Levy (season 6, episode 22)
- Jerry Lewis (season 1, episode 17)
- Mark McGwire (season 7, episode 13)
- Michael Moore (season 5, episode 23)
- Yoko Ono (season 4, episode 6)
- Regis Philbin (season 1, episode 18)
- Sydney Pollack (season 6, episode 13)
- Beata Poźniak (season 1, episode 12)
- Carl Reiner as Alan Brady (season 3, episode 16)
- Michael Richards as Cosmo Kramer (season 1, episode 8)
- Alex Rocco (season, 5, episode 7)
- Al Roker (season 3, episode 6)
- Jerry Seinfeld (season 7, episode 1)
- Brent Spiner (season 3, episode 15)
- Carol Ann Susi (season 1, episode 9)
- Wayne Tippit (season 1, episode 11)
- Patrick Warburton (season 1, episode 16)
- Bruce Willis (season 5, episode 24)
- Randy Savage (season 7, episode 17)
- Ryan Stiles (2 episodes)

=== Revival (2019) ===
==== Main ====
- Paul Reiser as Paul Buchman
- Helen Hunt as Jamie Buchman (née Stemple)
- Anne Ramsay as Lisa Stemple, Jamie's older sister
- John Pankow as Ira Buchman, Paul's cousin
- Abby Quinn as Mabel Buchman, Paul and Jamie's daughter
- Richard Kind as Dr. Mark Devanow
- Kecia Lewis as Tonya, Mark's new wife
- Antoinette LaVecchia as Lucia Francavella, Ira's girlfriend then fiancée

==== Returning ====
- Cynthia Harris as Sylvia Buchman, Paul's mother
- Jeff Garlin as Marvin
- Jerry Adler as Mr. Wicker
- Carol Burnett as Theresa Stemple, Jamie's mother
- Mo Gaffney as Dr. Sheila Kleinman, psychiatrist

==== Recurring ====
- Asif Ali as Rishi
- Sofia Hasmik as Ashta
- Makena Lei Gordon as Shannon
- Kimia Behpoornia as Yasmeen

==== Other ====
- Cloris Leachman as Mrs. Mandelbaum, one of Jamie's therapy patients
- Jason Alexander as himself
- Blake Cooper Griffin as Aaron
- Omar Adam as Craig
- Jennifer Westfeldt as Donna Lawson
- Jean Smart as Chelsea Stevens-Kobolakis
- Isaac Cheung as Waiter
- Joe Gillette as Vincent Maslin
- Christina Marie Karis as Mara Buckland
- Dylan Mattina as a New York City pedestrian
- Layla Mohammadi as Meg Martin
- Thomas Daniel Smith as Mark Buckland
- David Harbour as himself

== Episodes ==
Season	Episodes	Originally released		
Season	Episodes	First released	Last released	Network
1	22	September 23, 1992	May 22, 1993	NBC
2	25	September 16, 1993	May 19, 1994	NBC
3	24	September 22, 1994	May 18, 1995	NBC
4	24	September 24, 1995	May 19, 1996	NBC
5	24	September 17, 1996	May 20, 1997	NBC
6	23	September 23, 1997	May 19, 1998	NBC
7	22	September 22, 1998	May 24, 1999	NBC
8	12	November 20, 2019	December 18, 2019	Spectrum

=== Crossovers ===
Mad About You has had numerous connections to other NBC sitcoms set in New York City, as well as various other programs.

Friends (owned by Warner Bros. Television): Lisa Kudrow played the recurring role of Ursula, a flaky waitress at Riff's Bar, a local restaurant that Paul and Jamie frequented. Kudrow went on to star in the NBC sitcom Friends, playing the also somewhat flaky character of Phoebe Buffay, and for a time both series shared the same Thursday night line-up. While not originally intended, the characters of Ursula and Phoebe were later found to be identical twin sisters. In a Friends episode ("The One With The Two Parts", 1st Season), as part of a night of NBC sitcom crossovers, Jamie and Fran walk into Central Perk and mistake Phoebe for Ursula. Hunt and Kenzle were not identified on screen as Jamie and Fran. In the season three episode "Pandora's Box", Jamie causes a citywide power blackout in New York City, and the effects of the blackout are seen in the Friends episode, "The One with the Blackout", and there was also a blackout in the episode "Birthday in the Big House" of the NBC sitcom Madman of the People. All three episodes originally aired during the evening of November 3, 1994, alongside a Seinfeld episode which did not incorporate the blackout premise.

Seinfeld: In one episode ("The Apartment", 1st Season), Paul, pressured by Jamie, decides to sign over the lease of his old "bachelor pad" to the current tenant who is subleasing. When the tenant is revealed to be Cosmo Kramer (Michael Richards) of Seinfeld, Paul asks Kramer "What ever happened to that Jerry guy who used to live there?" Seinfeld, however, twice contradicted this connection, once even featuring a running joke about George's distaste for his fiancée Susan's fondness for watching Mad About You. In the Mad About You season seven episode "Season Opener", Paul, under the effects of Viagra, ran into Jerry Seinfeld in the street, who tells Paul to go away. At this point in Seinfeld's chronology, Jerry Seinfeld was supposed to be in prison.

The Dick Van Dyke Show: Carl Reiner reprised the role of Alan Brady from the 1960s sitcom. The episode made several references to the older show, such as Jamie at one point crying and whining "Oh, Paul!" – a take on Mary Tyler Moore's character Laura Petrie's frequent refrain "Oh, Rob!" – Ten episodes earlier, Paul almost trips over a box and says, "Get me, I'm Dick Van Dyke."

Style & Substance: In the 2019 revival ("Real Estate for Beginners", 8th Season), Jean Smart appeared as Chelsea Stevens-Kobolakis, a controlling, abrasive, short-tempered character that she had previously portrayed in showrunner Peter Tolan's 1998 series. Paul and Jamie attend a weekend team-building workshop that Chelsea hosts, mistakenly thinking that it's the marriage counseling seminar which is being held in a nearby room.

== Nielsen ratings ==
- 1992–93: #54 (10.18 rating)
- 1993–94: #31 (12.69 rating)
- 1994–95: #11 (15.2 rating)
- 1995–96: #37 (10.8 rating)
- 1996–97: #24 (11.0 rating)
- 1997–98: #32 (13.4 million viewers)
- 1998–99: #85 (9.1 million viewers)

== Awards ==
Mad About You won a Golden Globe Award, a Peabody Award, a Genesis Award, received five Emmy Award nominations for Outstanding Comedy Series, and was chosen Best Quality Comedy by the Viewers for Quality Television. Helen Hunt won the Primetime Emmy Award for Outstanding Lead Actress – Comedy Series four years in a row (1996–99).

== Media ==
=== Soundtrack ===
In 1997, Atlantic Records released a Mad About You soundtrack. The soundtrack from and inspired by the sitcom, is composed of fun and sentimental songs and clips from the show. The tracks are organized chronologically marking the milestones of the couple's relationship. The album is bookended by the two versions of Paul Reiser's song "Final Frontier"—the first track is the classic version used in the show's opening, and the last track is Anita Baker's jazzy, full-length rendition, with Reiser on keyboard. The 21 tracks are as follows:

1. "Final Frontier (TV Theme)" – Andrew Gold/The Sonora's Tucson Band
2. "Who I Am" – Faith Hill
3. "No Pressure" – Paul Reiser & Helen Hunt
4. "I've Been Lonely Too Long" – The Young Rascals
5. "At Last" – Etta James
6. "That's Marriage?" – Paul Reiser & Helen Hunt
7. "Ice Cream" – Sarah McLachlan
8. "I Love the Way You Love Me" – Eric Martin
9. "Nobody Knows Me" – Lyle Lovett
10. "Sneaky Feelings" – Elvis Costello
11. "A Talk in the Park" – Paul Reiser & Helen Hunt
12. "Love and Forgiveness" – Julia Fordham
13. "A Magic Moment" – Paul Reiser & Helen Hunt
14. "The Things We've Handed Down" – Marc Cohn
15. "Lullaby for You" – BeBe Winans
16. "She Crawls Away" – Hootie & the Blowfish
17. "My First Child" – Nil Lara
18. "Beautiful Boy (Darling Boy)" – John Lennon
19. "Baby Girl" – The Tony Rich Project
20. "Unconditional Love" – Paul Reiser & Helen Hunt
21. "Mad About You – The Final Frontier" – Anita Baker

=== Home media ===
Sony Pictures Home Entertainment has released the first three seasons of Mad About You on DVD in Region 1 and 4. The first two seasons were also made available in Region 2. No subsequent seasons were released by Sony Pictures Home Entertainment.

In February 2010, Shout! Factory acquired the distribution rights to the remaining seasons of Mad About You on DVD. They subsequently released seasons 4 and 5 on DVD.

On August 27, 2013, it was announced that Mill Creek Entertainment had acquired the rights to various television series from the Sony Pictures library including Mad About You. They subsequently re-released the first and second seasons on DVD on August 5, 2014.

Mill Creek released the complete series on a 14-DVD set on May 3, 2016.

As of August 1, 2019, the entire series has been available to Spectrum subscribers as part of the run-up to the premiere of the revival series.

On December 8, 2020, the revival season, alongside the original series, was added to Amazon Prime Video.

In July, 2025, both the original series and the twelve 2019 Season 8 episodes from Spectrum, were added to Hulu.

==== Season releases ====
DVD name	Ep. #	Release date
The Complete 1st Season	22	October 22, 2002
The Complete 2nd Season	25	April 22, 2003
The Complete 3rd Season	24	February 6, 2007
The Complete 4th Season	24	June 29, 2010
The Complete 5th Season	24	June 29, 2010
The Complete 6th Season	24	N/A
The Complete 7th Season	24	N/A
The Complete Series	164	May 3, 2016

==== Best-of releases ====
DVD name	Release date	Ep. #	Additional information
Mad About You Collection	February 8, 2005	22	Blooper Reel: The Seven Warning Signs of Madness; Audio commentaries: Paul Reiser & Helen Hunt on "The Final Frontier" and "The Pilot"; Featurette: Paul Reiser & Helen Hunt Are Mad About the Theme; Featurette: Paul Reiser & Helen Hunt Are Mad About the Guest Stars; Paul and Helen introduce and discuss each episode

== Adaptations ==
A Chilean adaptation under the title Loco por ti (translated as Crazy About You) aired on TVN during 2004.

An Argentine adaptation under the title Loco por vos (translated as Crazy About You) stylized as Loco x vos aired on Telefe from September 5 until December 29, 2016. The second season was originally going to air in 2017 but was scrapped later on.

A British adaptation under the title Loved by You aired for two seasons on ITV from 11 March 1997 until 27 August 1998.

A Chinese adaptation aired on Dragon TV on January 4, 2016.

A Mexican adaptation under the title Enloqueciendo contigo premiered on Sony Channel on January 19, 2025.
