= Valley of the Boom =

American docudrama television miniseries

- Genre: Docudrama miniseries
- Created by: Matthew Carnahan
- Starring: Bradley Whitford; Lamorne Morris; Oliver Cooper; John Karna; Dakota Shapiro; John Murphy; Steve Zahn
- Composer: Kyle Dixon; Michael Stein
- Country of origin: United States
- Original language: English
- No. of episodes: 6

Production
- Executive producers: David Walpert; Brant Pinvidic; Jason Goldberg; Arianna Huffington; Matthew Carnahan
- Producers: Denise Pleune; Falguni Lakhani-Adams; Arielle Boisvert; Shawn Williamson; Joel Ehninger
- Production locations: Vancouver, Canada
- Cinematography: François Dagenais
- Editors: Suzy Elmiger; Jon Corn; Jeff Groth; Jeff Mee; Mikki Levi
- Camera setup: Single-camera
- Running time: 43–48 minutes
- Production companies: Matthew Carnahan Circus Products; STX Television

Original release
- Network: National Geographic
- Release: January 13 – January 27, 2019

Valley of the Boom (stylized as Valley_of_the_BOOM) is an American docudrama television miniseries created by Matthew Carnahan that premiered on January 13, 2019, on National Geographic. The series centers on the 1990s tech boom and bust in Silicon Valley and it stars Bradley Whitford, Steve Zahn, Lamorne Morris, John Karna, Dakota Shapiro, Oliver Cooper, and John Murphy.

== Premise ==
Valley of the Boom takes a close look at "the culture of speculation, innovation and debauchery that led to the rapid inflation and burst of the 1990s tech bubble. As with its hybrid series Mars, Nat Geo [uses] select doc elements to support the scripted drama to tell the true inside story of the dramatic early days of Silicon Valley."

The series features interviews with many of the people depicted in the dramatized portions of the production in addition to other Internet personalities such as Mark Cuban and Arianna Huffington. Notably absent from these interviews are Netscape co-founder and former vice president of technology Marc Andreessen, who declined to be interviewed, and Jamie Zawinski.

Although the program is primarily focused on the quick rise and fall of three influential technology companies, namely Netscape, theGlobe.com, and Pixelon, the program also highlights smaller companies of that era, such as sfGirl.com.

== Cast and characters ==
=== Main ===
- Bradley Whitford as James L. Barksdale
- Lamorne Morris as Darrin Morris
- Oliver Cooper as Todd Krizelman
- John Karna as Marc Andreessen
- Dakota Shapiro as Stephan Paternot
- John Murphy as Jim Clark
- Steve Zahn as Michael Fenne

=== Recurring ===
- Raf Rogers as Sean Alvaro
- Chiara Zanni as Sheila
- Fred Henderson as Mike Egan
- Camille Hollett-French as Tara Hernandez
- Mike Kovac as Balding Ponytail Coder
- Nick Hunnings as Ed Cespedes
- Tom Stevens as Phillip
- Siobhan Williams as Jenn
- Vincent Dangerfield as Lee Wiskowski
- Jacob Richter as Dan Goodin
- Hilary Jardine as Patty Beron
- Paul Herbert as Paul Ward
- Carey Feehan as Robert Dunning
- Donna Benedicto as Kate

=== Guest ===
- Keegan Connor Tracy as Rosanne Siino ("Part 1: print ("hello, world")")
- Luvia Petersen as Mary Meeker ("Part 1: print ("hello, world")")
- Michael Patrick Denis as Thomas Reardon ("Part 2: pseudocode")
- Jesse James as Barry Moore ("Part 4: priority inversion")
- Siobhan Williams as Jenn ("Part 4: priority inversion")
- Doug Abrahams as Ace Greenberg ("Part 4: priority inversion")
- David Stuart as Pit Boss ("Part 4: priority inversion")
- Connor Tracy as Rosanne Siino ("Part 5: segfault")
- Rachel Hayward as Joyce ("Part 5: segfault")
- Tom Stevens as Phillip ("Part 6: fatal error")

== Episodes ==
No.	Title	Directed by	Written by	Original release date	U.S. viewers (millions)
1	"Part 1: print ("hello, world")"	Matthew Carnahan	Matthew Carnahan	January 13, 2019 (Note: The first two episodes were made available on December 21, 2018 on the National Geographic website.)	0.415
Jim Barksdale and team take Netscape on a road show in search of potential investors; Stephan Paternot and Todd Krizelman struggle to secure financing for their virtual community platform, TheGlobe.com; Michael Fenne changes his physical appearance.
2	"Part 2: pseudocode"	Matthew Carnahan	Matthew Carnahan	January 13, 2019	0.312
Jim Barksdale leads Netscape through a successful IPO, making it the dominant browser; Microsoft retaliates, sparking the browser wars; Michael Fenne excitedly starts a new company that promises to deliver revolutionary streaming technology.
3	"Part 3: agile method"	Gary Goldman	David Walpert	January 20, 2019	0.196
With the browser wars in full swing, Microsoft attacks Netscape; TheGlobe.com team hesitates to bring on a potential investor, unconvinced he'll be a good fit; using stolen technology, Michael Fenne launches a new company called Pixelon.
4	"Part 4: priority inversion"	Tamra Davis	Tracy Barone	January 20, 2019	0.151
Microsoft bundles Internet Explorer with every new Windows PC; Stephan Paternot and Todd Krizelman run on fumes; as Pixelon prepares for a live event, Michael Fenne's management style grows more erratic, grabbing the attention of an employee.
5	"Part 5: segfault"	Matthew Carnahan	David Walpert	January 27, 2019	N/A
Jim Barksdale takes drastic measures to re-establish Netscape as an innovator; TheGlobe.com struggles to maintain focus on virtual communities; Pixelon launches a massive concert in Las Vegas as it introduces its revolutionary streaming technology.
6	"Part 6: fatal error"	Matthew Carnahan	Story by : Cristina Boada & Matthew Carnahan; Teleplay by : Matthew Carnahan	January 27, 2019	N/A
Jim Barksdale keeps up with the Microsoft antitrust case; Stephan Paternot and Todd Krizelman try to save TheGlobe.com as they discover some potentially damaging news; Pixelon's investors and board members confront Michael Fenne.

== Production ==
=== Development ===
On November 15, 2017, it was announced that National Geographic had given the production a series order consisting of six episodes. Executive producers included Matthew Carnahan, Arianna Huffington, Jason Goldberg, Brant Pinvidic, and David Walpert. Carnahan acted as showrunner for the series and directed as well. David Newsom was co-executive producer and led the non-scripted unit of the production. Joel Ehninger acted in the role of producer. Production companies involved with the series included STXtelevision and Matthew Carnahan Circus Products. On September 24, 2018, it was announced that the series would premiere on January 13, 2019.

=== Casting ===
On March 16, 2018, it was announced that Bradley Whitford, Steve Zahn, Lamorne Morris, John Karna, Dakota Shapiro, and Oliver Cooper had joined the series' main cast.

=== Filming ===
Principal photography for the series began on March 26, 2018 in Vancouver, Canada and was expected to conclude by May 28, 2018.

== Release ==
=== Marketing ===
On July 24, 2018, the first trailer for the series was released.

=== Premiere ===
On September 21, 2018, the series held its world premiere during the second annual Tribeca TV Festival in New York City. Following a screening, a conversation took place featuring members of the cast and crew including creator Matthew Carnahan, actors Bradley Whitford, Steve Zahn, Lamorne Morris, and real-life subject Stephan Paternot, founder of theGlobe.com.

=== Distribution ===
The series premiered globally on National Geographic in 171 countries and 45 languages. STXtelevision distributes the series in China.

== Reception ==
The series has been met with a mixed response from critics upon its premiere. On the review aggregation website Rotten Tomatoes, the series holds a 72% approval rating with an average rating of 5.90 out of 10 based on 18 reviews. The website's critical consensus reads, "A visual collage of dot com history, Valley of Boom [sic] proves to be just as sprawling and ramshackle as the docuseries' subject." Metacritic, which uses a weighted average, assigned the series a score of 58 out of 100 based on 11 critics, indicating "mixed or average reviews".
