= Dot-com party =

Social event hosted by an Internet-related business

A dot-com party (often known as an Internet party or more generally, a launch party) is a social and business networking party hosted by an Internet-related business, typically for promotional purposes or to celebrate a corporate event such as a product launch, venture funding round, or corporate acquisition.

== History ==
Dot-com parties became a notorious part of the culture of the American "dot-com" business era of 1997 to 2001, particularly in the San Francisco Bay Area.

Dot-com parties, compared to "scenes from The Great Gatsby", were markedly different from conventional corporate entertainment, which tends to be more private, and often fancier if less ostentatious. Common features of dot-com parties included live bands, decorations, product demonstrations, gatecrashers, exotic or fancy venues, excessive alcohol consumption, and "schwag bag" giveaways. Some popular alternative musicians such as Elvis Costello, Beck, the B-52s, and Moby, were particularly active on the Internet circuit. Some Internet entrepreneurs such as Craig Newmark and Patty Beron (sfgirl.com) were well known for hosting and attending the events. Other noted Internet partiers included Oliver Muoto and the founders of a public relations firm, Marino & Associates. Guest appearances by Internet-meme celebrities such as Mahir were also popular.

During the height of the era 15 to 20 such events took place per week in San Francisco alone. The hosts were typically Internet start-up companies, although some events were held by service providers, magazine publishers, venture-capital firms, and industry organizations. Trade shows such as SIGGRAPH, Macworld, and COMDEX would have several parties per night, some open but mostly by invitation. Various gossip blogs, newspaper columns, and websites such as DrinkExchange, WorkIt, sfgirl.com, Fucked Company, and the A-List, regularly chronicled the exploits of the companies and their dot-com party guests.

Time magazine called The Industry Standard's rooftop parties a "San Francisco Institution". The "ultimate" dot-com party was arguably the iBASH'99 launch party held at the MGM Grand Las Vegas at a cost of more than $10 million, featuring The Who and the Dixie Chicks. Its host, Pixelon, was a sham company that went bankrupt within less than a year.

By late 2000 funding for parties had begun to dry up as corporate events became more frugal and private, less ostentatious, and more closely directed to achieving specific business goals. During the final days of the dot-com bubble, company-hosted parties gave way to trade-show and industry mixers that typically cost $40,000 to $60,000 to host. The subsequent crash of the venture finance-backed Internet industry in 2001 saw a lull in public celebrations, although there were some nostalgic events in honor of the massive layoffs and demise of many companies such as sfgirl's "pink slip parties" and similar events in New York City, which also became a focus of corporate recruiters. The San Francisco Chronicle noted the rise and fall of dot-com parties when comparing the lavish 2000 Webby Awards to the 2004 awards, which had no live show or organized celebration at all.

== Resurgence ==
In the late 2000s, social network services such as Yelp.com and Foursquare held frequent parties for their members as a way to reward loyalty and participation among their members, sign up new members, and channel promotional goods and services from their paid sponsors. With a return of venture capital investment following the great recession, startups such as Airbnb began to host Internet office parties once again, to celebrate office moves and product launches.

== Legacy ==
One innovation of early dot-com parties, email invite lists and online RSVP lists, continued and has become a key feature of online event marketing, "events" features of online social networking services such as Facebook, and event promotion services. Websites that list upcoming parties and events, sometimes in exchange for paid sponsorships, are now common in most cities and most industries worldwide.

Some websites such as Craigslist, and Ryze (an early predecessor of Friendster) that were started in order to organize or publicize dot-com parties, became major companies in their own right.

== Commentary ==
Although companies often justified party throwing as a tool for branding, sales, marketing buzz, publicity, and recruitment, they rarely tracked the success or financial return from the money spent. In reality, at a typical party most guests were uninvited and typically had no idea who the host was or what business they were in. Many commentators criticized the events as wasteful displays of wealth, poor planning of inexperienced managers, or excuses for binge drinking.

Business historian Nancy Koehn noted that "Never before, not during the textile, transportation or steel booms, have companies spent so much money on people who don't work for them". Salon.com, commenting on the excess, compared dot-com parties to more traditional corporate entertainment: "Wall Street never thought to invite half of Manhattan".
