= List of House of Lies episodes =

House of Lies is an American dark comedy created by Matthew Carnahan, which premiered on Showtime on January 8, 2012. The series is based on the book, House of Lies: How Management Consultants Steal Your Watch and Then Tell You the Time, written by Martin Kihn, a former consultant at Booz Allen Hamilton.

Episodes are sometimes available for on-demand streaming via the Showtime Anytime service several days before their scheduled TV air date. On May 17, 2016, Showtime canceled the series after five seasons. During the course of the series, 58 episodes of House of Lies aired, between January 8, 2012, and June 12, 2016.

== Series overview ==
| Season | Episodes | Originally released | |
| Season | Episodes | First released | Last released |
|---|---|---|---|
| 1 | 12 | January 8, 2012 | April 1, 2012 |
| 2 | 12 | January 13, 2013 | April 7, 2013 |
| 3 | 12 | January 12, 2014 | April 6, 2014 |
| 4 | 12 | January 11, 2015 | March 29, 2015 |
| 5 | 10 | April 10, 2016 | June 12, 2016 |

== Episodes ==
=== Season 1 (2012) ===
| No. overall | No. in season | Title | Directed by | Written by | Original release date | US viewers (millions) |
|---|---|---|---|---|---|---|
| 1 | 1 | "Gods of Dangerous Financial Instruments" | Stephen Hopkins | Matthew Carnahan | January 8, 2012 | 1.03 |
Marty and the Pod travel to New York City to consult for MetroCapital, a mega-bank that is looking for a plan to unscrupulously justify taking their year-end bonuses as the financial world around them burns. Unfortunately, Marty makes an enemy out of MetroCapital's number two guy Greg Norbert in the process because April, the stripper/call girl he attempts to pass off as his wife, has sex with Greg's sexually repressed wife. Their biggest business rivals -- run by his ex wife with whom he continues to have sex with sometimes -- are also offered the job. They manage to get hired by inventing a debt cancellation campaign which will have a big publicity impact but cost very little. Back at home, Marty gets some unwanted advice on how to raise his son Roscoe from Jeremiah Kaan, Marty's live-in father, when Roscoe decides to audition for the female lead in a school play. Tension ensues when the role for the leading female in the play is contested between Roscoe and another girl (Britney). The parents of both children have been informed to attend a meeting in which it will be decided who gets the coveted position. Ultimately, Marty's son is given another role in the school play instead of that of the lead female role (Sandy). Upon being told this, Roscoe complains it is not fair, and Marty responds, "Life is full of unfair moments, bud". Afterwards, the family go to the school for the play. As the show is going on, Marty is missing: he was having sex with Britney's mom in a car. After the session, they go back inside and act like nothing happened.
| 2 | 2 | "Amsterdam" | Stephen Hopkins | Matthew Carnahan | January 15, 2012 | 0.891 |
Marty and the Pod are sent to Phoenix to clean up a mess at a very powerful sports franchise, caused by the owners' impending divorce. Their marriage crisis can't be fixed, but they solve the team's problems by having the owners act reconciled. Once there, Jeannie takes a dinner meeting with Derek, an old flame; but she is deflated when she finds out that his real intentions regarding her are to offer her a new job because he's a headhunter.
| 3 | 3 | "Microphallus" | Seith Mann | Matthew Carnahan | January 22, 2012 | 0.725 |
Marty arrives at the offices to find Greg Norbert there to announce the possible acquisition of Galweather by MetroCapital. The Pod then flies to Indiana to consult for a beverage company, where Marty applies his management skills to turn a loss into a win. The company wants to run some improvement program which may very well turn out horribly. In the end, they get fired not advising to run the program, but get hired by another company since Marty forecasts that the company will go broke very soon. Meanwhile, Clyde questions whether Doug actually hooked up with a transvestite (which he did), and Roscoe struggles with the confusing feelings of liking both a boy and a girl. Marty and his father suffer in silence because it's the anniversary of the suicide of Marty's mother.
| 4 | 4 | "Mini-Mogul" | Stephen Hopkins | Story by : Kate Garwood & Karin Gist; Teleplay by : Karin Gist | January 29, 2012 | 1.02 |
With Jeremiah out of town, Marty is forced to bring his son Roscoe to his next job in San Francisco. Hoping to get some quality time with his dad, Roscoe ends up spending it all with the Pod instead, as Marty is forced to babysit Alex Katsnelson, the 20-year-old CEO of a security software company. Roscoe tells Doug he's being bullied at school, to which Doug (who himself had been bullied) answers that it's pure envy from the others. Marty and the Pod play up divisions between Alex and the board in order to manipulate Alex into hiring them. Meanwhile, Jeannie reacts to her recent engagement by having a tryst with Kurt, a tortured musician whom she meets in a coffee house. When she comes home, she tells her fiancé Wes that they really should do the engagement party that she had previously not wanted to do, but that they should do it without people from work. Jeannie has not told her co-workers about her engagement, a fact which Wes does not know.
| 5 | 5 | "Utah" | Adam Bernstein | David Walpert | February 5, 2012 | 0.829 |
On a consulting gig in Utah, Jeannie is put in charge of the Pod's pitch when it becomes clear that the racist CEO of a no-frills motel chain won't take Marty seriously. She almost ruins it, but is able to save it at the last minute. Clyde tries to make inroads with a virginal Mormon woman who would let him have anal sex with him; but he's then too afraid and runs away. Back in Los Angeles, Monica decides to spend some quality time with Roscoe after her married boyfriend rejects her; but their parent-son bonding takes a dark turn entering his house, leading Roscoe to better understand his mother and better appreciate his father.
| 6 | 6 | "Our Descent Into Los Angeles" | Stephen Hopkins | Story by : Matthew Carnahan & Devon Shepard; Teleplay by : Matthew Carnahan & Devon Shepard | February 12, 2012 | 0.986 |
Marty goes to war with his son's school after Roscoe is accused of sexual harassment for trying to kiss a boy. In the end, it turns out that it was the other way around. But Marty's hit in his weak spot when the others talk about his mother's suicide. On the home front, Marty's personal life is further complicated by the reappearance of April, the stripper whom he had met in New York and who had led to Greg getting divorced. April has been accepted at a law school; but she faces a great deal of trouble because a female sex partner of hers, who was also a cop, died when she drank a full bottle of water with GHB. Elsewhere, Jeannie starts to get cold feet at the prospect of her upcoming wedding when she and her fiancé visit a wedding cake bakery.
| 7 | 7 | "Bareback Town" | Miguel Arteta | Barbara Nance | February 19, 2012 | 0.846 |
When the Pod goes to Washington D.C. to consult for a pharmaceutical company, Marty faces a challenge from April to stay monogamous on the road, which puts Jeannie in the position of having to "take one for the team" and fully satisfy a female client who originally wanted to have sex with Marty. The team has to decide whether they have a conscience or not. The female client, who knows about her company's drug's side effects, declares war on Marty after having been fired because of him. Back in Los Angeles, Jeremiah reveals he has Parkinson's to April, and asks for her discretion until he can tell Marty himself. Finally, a jealous Monica (jealous because Marty turned her down in DC) drops a huge bombshell on Marty: she wants to fight for custody of Roscoe.
| 8 | 8 | "Veritas" | Stephen Hopkins | Wesley S. Nickerson III | March 4, 2012 | 0.823 |
Marty and the Pod take part in the annual Galweather-Stearn recruiting event, where the best and brightest from Harvard Business School are wined and dined. Once there, Marty teaches James, the lone black recruit in this predominantly white business, the most important thing he knows -- never to trust anyone. Meanwhile, Doug sets out to prove to Clyde that he can coach any one of the possible recruits onto 'the list', in the end winning, but being severely embarrassed. Jeannie grills a sexy, flirty recruit to see if she's all style and no substance -- a stance that becomes very hypocritical when we learn a secret Jeannie has been hiding -- she sleeps with Marco Pelios, the business legend named "The Rainmaker". Marco and Marty talk about the upcoming takeover by MetroCapital, which now is certain. They want to team up to bring Harrison "Skip" Galweather down.
| 9 | 9 | "Ouroboros" | Stephen Hopkins | Matthew Carnahan | March 11, 2012 | 0.698 |
Marty and the Pod are put through the wringer by their arch-rival firm Kinsley-Johnson as part of the due diligence performed by MetroCapital for the pending merger. Jeannie had done her best to keep her engagement to Wes from the Pod, but fails to keep it a secret from Marty when Wes comes to Galweather's building to visit Jeannie, and the two of them run into Marty on the street. The team goes clubbing with Greg Norbert, hoping that he'll reconcile with them. April and Roscoe bond, and they present a dance show for Marty. Marty learns about his father's Parkinson's condition when he finds a pill on the floor, and they discuss it. The custody battle between Marty and Monica begins.
| 10 | 10 | "Prologue and Aftermath" | Beth McCarthy Miller | Karen Gist | March 18, 2012 | 0.616 |
Jeannie embarks on a gig to establish her own legend in the consulting world when she leads the Pod to her hometown on a mission to resurrect an ailing megachurch. After having seen that the pastor cheats on his wife with his secretary, the pastor's wife thinks that he could also do so with Jeannie and wants to cancel the arrangement with the Pod. But Jeannie is able to save the deal. Jeannie and her mother have an argument over her father; and Jeannie's father-issues also become clear when she's almost crying while having sex with Marco. Marty enters into custody mediation with Monica; but her powers of manipulation are in full force, as she threatens and ultimately ends Marty's relationship with April after having seduced him.
| 11 | 11 | "Business" | Stephen Hopkins | David Walpert | March 25, 2012 | 0.715 |
Marty and Marco "The Rainmaker" Pelios work together to put the kibosh on their firm's acquisition by MetroCapital. Via Greg, the Pod team gets hold of damaging information which Marty uses against Skip. On his own, the Rainmaker uses this information to get rid of Skip and become the boss, and then votes in favor of the merger. This back-stabbing leaves Marty and the Rainmaker mortal enemies instead of allies. Skip swears revenge against Marty. Jeannie learns that the Rainmaker not only sexually uses her but also other employees. In the aftermath of Marty's breakup with April, he must deal with the silent treatment from an angry Roscoe. Marty picks up a bartender who "surprisingly" turns out to be the Rainmaker's daughter. In the middle of nowhere, his car breaks down.
| 12 | 12 | "The Mayan Apocalypse" | Matthew Carnahan | Matthew Carnahan | April 1, 2012 | 0.775 |
With the help of Greg Norbert, Marty and the Pod fight to pull off an eleventh-hour reprieve and stop the MetroCapital acquisition from happening. In the end, they manage to do so by Jeannie leading a class-action lawsuit of many of the firm's female employees against the Rainmaker, who had sexual relationships with them all promising them to become partners. Jeannie decides to tell Wes that she's not ready to marry him; he responds by deeply insulting her and cancelling their engagement. Meanwhile, Marty's son Roscoe makes a life-altering choice of his own: he decides to move to in with his mother Monica after Marty fails to keep his promise to help him with a school presentation. Marty and Jeannie get extremely drunk, just staring at each other.

=== Season 2 (2013) ===
| No. overall | No. in season | Title | Directed by | Written by | Original release date | US viewers (millions) |
|---|---|---|---|---|---|---|
| 13 | 1 | "Stochasticity" | Stephen Hopkins | Matthew Carnahan | January 13, 2013 | 1.19 |
Marty and the Pod struggle to determine who their new client is, due to a breakdown of communication at the firm and the client's guarded and secretive behaviour. In the end, they find out that their client owns a casino in Las Vegas. Meanwhile, Jeannie returns from paid vacation and is promoted by the new Interim CEO of Galweather Stearn, while hazy memories of her and Marty's night together continue to flood back. She has a blackout concerning that night, as well as Marty. In the end, she remembers telling him that she loves him, but she doesn't tell him again sober, and he can't remember.
| 14 | 2 | "When Dinosaurs Ruled the Planet" | Stephen Hopkins | David Walpert | January 20, 2013 | 0.893 |
Marty, Doug and Clyde begin consulting work on the Emerald casino in Las Vegas, where they meet Tamara, a classmate of Marty's who recently joined Galweather Stearn. Jeannie has a confrontation with Julianne, and her bad mood continues when Tamara ruins the client consultation in Las Vegas by proposing a new implementation that is not yet legalized and not supporting Marty's original plans. Marty initiates a possible deal with another casino owner. While they party, Jeannie and Marty both remember that they told each other "I love you", and that it wasn't just Jeannie telling him.
| 15 | 3 | "Man–Date" | Stephen Hopkins | Matthew Carnahan | January 27, 2013 | 1.14 |
After Tamara's comments lead to the end of the Pinkus casino deal, Clyde and Marty try to salvage things by wooing the business of the self-made millionaire casino/internet mogul Carlson who notoriously hates consultants. Therefore, they spend an evening with two start-up club owners leading to Carlson approving of the deal. Jeannie springs into action and tries to assess how big of a threat Tamara is to her in the Company by suggesting the two enjoy a spa day together. Meanwhile, Monica makes a sexual connection with her personal chef Tessa after having advised Roscoe on eyeliner.
| 16 | 4 | "Damonschildren.org" | Stephen Hopkins | Matthew Carnahan | February 10, 2013 | 0.915 |
When Hollywood superstar Matt Damon drops by Galweather-Stearn and tasks them to find him a charity to enhance his image, Marty discovers he may have to go further than he wants to because Matt is an enormous jerk, still everyone adores him, not believing Marty. In the end, Matt takes the deal but it is not clear exactly how low Marty had to go to secure it. Meanwhile, Jeannie spends rare down time with Roscoe playing baseball, while Tessa presses Monica about their relationship status.
| 17 | 5 | "Sincerity is an Easy Disguise in This Business" | Anton Cropper | Karen Gist | February 17, 2013 | 0.795 |
Marty gets an unwelcome visitor - his militant younger brother whose reasons for resurfacing after 3 years seem dubious. It turns out that he returned because their father wants to try a risky Parkinson treatment - which Marty didn't know about. Doug "The Gug" and Jeannie go on assignment with an online dating firm and go on blind dates as provided by the dating firm's website in California. Doug has a brilliant date called Sarah which makes Doug miss his ex Sarah even more, while Jeannie was rude and critical to her date causing him to leave in disgust. Meanwhile, Marty finds a kindred spirit in a political consultant while on a visit with a banking CEO in Chicago with Clyde, where he has an affair with the CEO's political adviser (Lisa Edelstein). She tells him that Julianne wanted her to turn him down.
| 18 | 6 | "Family Values" | Stephen Hopkins | Wesley S. Nickerson III | February 24, 2013 | 0.773 |
Marty questions his commitment to Galweather-Stearn when an executive retreat conflicts with his plans to spend desperately needed time with Roscoe. He watches Roscoe's dance in school which is sexually very provocative instead of going to a seminar with his co-workers. Also, he has a confrontation with his Boss. Doug gains a new perspective on his fellow Podders after introducing them to his girlfriend Sarah which he met on the internet. Marty is tempted to explore things with Tamara after she makes a startling admission about problems in her marriage with her husband Kevin. They all party hard during a company weekend. Marty tells Tamara that he'll leave Galweather-Stearn in sometime, but doesn't yet know when.
| 19 | 7 | "The Runner Stumbles" | Stephen Hopkins | Matthew Carnahan | March 3, 2013 | 0.947 |
Jeannie is on a short leash with Galweather-Stearn's Interim CEO; one screw-up, and she's gone. Enter an old boyfriend who posts a sex tape of her on the internet. In the end, he takes it off the internet. Meanwhile, Marty faces a moral dilemma when he discovers evidence of a banking client's role in a bad for PR lending scheme, using it as leverage to finance his own future consulting firm Kaan and Associates. He gets very nervous during a press conference and goes jogging when he is controlled by two policemen. He loses his cool and gets beaten up and arrested.
| 20 | 8 | "Wonders of the World" | David Von Ancken | David Walpert | March 10, 2013 | 0.856 |
Jeannie meets an unlikely suitor in the CEO of an adult toy company while consulting with them. They flirt and get it on. While on that engagement, Doug has an idea for a wild gift for Sarah. Malcolm's conniving behavior begins to further drive a wedge between Marty and Jeremiah. Marty first stayed at home dealing with the aftermath of his beating by the police, but doesn't want to make a public fuss about it. He and the team are ordered to Carlson enterprises because their CEO claims to have found anomalies, which turn out to be nothing. Marty “visits” Tamara in her room. Roscoe tells Marty he wants to move back in with him.
| 21 | 9 | "Liability" | Stephen Hopkins | Karen Gist | March 17, 2013 | 0.805 |
Doug and Clyde have to give depositions in a wrongful death lawsuit against a telecommunications company. While Doug is very nervous, Clyde has some fears about it and thinks about his conscience. The two have to sleep in the same bed because the hotel messed up. Mogul Michael Carlson inexplicably slows Marty's attempts to close a deal with his waste of time. Monica starts to unravel after Roscoe decides to move back in with Marty. After he found evidence of her using drugs again, as revenge she sleeps with his brother Malcolm. Later, she fires Tessa. Jeannie has to work with Tamara whom the group now knows is sleeping with Marty. He tells her husband Kevin about it.
| 22 | 10 | "Exit Strategy" | Adam Bernstein | Wesley S. Nickerson III & Theo Travers | March 24, 2013 | 0.771 |
Marty covertly makes plans for his post-Galweather future. Meanwhile, Jeannie ponders hers when given a great career opportunity of leading her own pod. We also learn that her relationship to Nate “the dildo king” works well. Doug must slay his fear of navigating social settings when a chance to make himself a bigger role in the company falls into his lap. Luckily, his girlfriend Sarah is able to motivate and cheer him on. At home, tensions come to a head between Marty and his brother Malcolm over money. In the end, Malcolm leaves. Also, Monica tries to manipulate Tamara and Marty.
| 23 | 11 | "Hostile Takeover" | Stephen Hopkins | Wesley S. Nickerson III & Theo Travers | March 31, 2013 | 0.787 |
After learning privileged information about Tamara (she'll take another job), Marty is pushed to the brink by an erratic, temperamental Carlson while trying to close the deal. He leaves him in the desert and contacts Pinkus, the owner of the Emerald casino, and persuades him to close the deal in order to defend himself against Carlson and Tamara. Clyde sees his chance to increase his standing in the company by trying to end the Dushkin twins brand beyond Las Vegas War Nightclub. Jeannie breaks up with Nate.
| 24 | 12 | "Til Death Do Us Part" | Stephen Hopkins | Matthew Carnahan & David Walpert | April 7, 2013 | 0.862 |
Doug's marriage to Sarah is coming up, but it turns out that Doug didn't really propose to her but that it was a misunderstanding in the restaurant, and later even that Sarah contrived it herself, still Doug marries her. She eyes a Vegas shotgun wedding just as the Pod close their final major deal as part of Galweather Stearn. Doug is the only one really pondering about the job change to Kaan's new company, in the end telling him not to change. However, Marty's backhanded machinations lead to increased tension and unintended, devastating consequences for everyone. Especially with Clyde betraying Marty by telling Monica and Juliane everything because he thinks he did so much for the Carlson deal. Also, Juliane tampered with Marty's data. Jeannie decides to tell Marty that she loves him, but it's too much for him that moment, so she runs away. After a rough fight involving Marty, Clyde and Carlson, the Pinkus deal is closed.

=== Season 3 (2014) ===
| No. overall | No. in season | Title | Directed by | Written by | Original release date | US viewers (millions) |
|---|---|---|---|---|---|---|
| 25 | 1 | "Wreckage" | Stephen Hopkins | Matthew Carnahan | January 12, 2014 | 0.842 |
Marty begins his own business 'Kaan & Associates' and pursues a grocery store client in China, also disturbing another grocery store client who belonged to Monica's company before by shifting him to Jeannie. Meanwhile, Clyde continues work for Monica and begins regretting his decision suffering from her actions. Doug reminisces the old Pod back at Galweather, where Jeannie is now running her own Pod which Doug's in. Roscoe is trying to get into the basketball team.
| 26 | 2 | "Power" | Stephen Hopkins | Matthew Carnahan | January 19, 2014 | 0.796 |
Marty sleeps with a motivational trainer and still has nightmares. Later, he finally meets Roscoe's crush, Lex, who's on the basketball team with him. At Galweather, Jeannie tries to get an account with the Department of Defense. She also meets with Jeremiah, Marty and Roscoe. Sarah scares Doug when she reveals she wants a baby and she already stopped taking birth control. Monica crosses the line with a co-worker that ends violently by the co-worker sticking a knife in her leg. Clyde wants Monica to fire him but she wouldn't. In the end, Jeannie asks Marty whether he was glad to start working on his own. He starts by answering that “it would be worth if…”, but then doesn't tell her that he misses her.
| 27 | 3 | "Boom" | Stephen Hopkins | David Walpert | January 26, 2014 | 0.741 |
Marty is unhappy when he discovers that Jeannie backstabbed him on their plan that each of them keeps a food company busy. But she debates with him over her working for him. Over at Galweather Stearn, Julianne is replaced by the Rainmaker who promises to make Jeannie's career a miserable one. It seems like the guy Jeannie took the DoD-account from organized this. Jeannie then organizes a co-worker to inform the press over irregularities at Galweather in the account of the Department of Defense. Clyde starts to work at Monica's home.
| 28 | 4 | "Associates" | Don Cheadle | David Walpert | February 2, 2014 | 0.646 |
With Galweather in flames from a leak of information, Jeannie and Doug finally join Kaan & Associates where the new pod pursues a successful HipHop clothing company called 'DollaHyde' whose owners don't agree on the future of their company. Clyde didn't go to work for three days and loses control over himself. Jeannie and Marty argue over being equal associates. In the middle of the night, Clyde, having been arrested by the police, calls Marty to pick him up. Roscoe and Lex kiss.
| 29 | 5 | "Soldiers" | Stephen Hopkins | Jessika Borsiczky | February 9, 2014 | 0.852 |
Marty and Dre tighten their friendship and continue to go through with their plan of removing Lukas from Dollahyde. Clyde attempts to make up with Marty, who is still mad from their falling out. He contacts an old flame named Marissa trying to bring in her huge internet company. Surprisingly, she flirts with him. Marty's father Jeremiah sleeps with a young woman named Chantelle who's becoming a therapist. Doug fakes orgasms because he hasn't decided yet whether he wants a baby or not, but in the end gets over it after Clyde talks to him. Monica gets back to work and finds herself getting fired.
| 30 | 6 | "Middlegame" | Stephen Hopkins | Wesley S. Nickerson III | February 16, 2014 | 0.819 |
At the Dollahyde shoe premiere party, Marty considers switching sides and removing Dre from Dollahyde instead of Lukas. He therefore sends Jeannie to Lukas to romantically find out how he's thinking. But he already put the pieces together and knows the plan. Meanwhile, Doug is guilt-ridden when Lukas' dog gets into a box of chocolates he brought as a gift, and Clyde still wants a place on Marty's good side. In the end, Lukas starts a fight with Dre.
| 31 | 7 | "Pushback" | Uta Briesewitz | Taii K. Austin | February 23, 2014 | 0.798 |
Marty, Jeannie, Doug, and Clyde try to convince Lukas to leave the company for a large sum of money that Dre doesn't have. It doesn't work, but later on Jeannie manages to convince him. Meanwhile, Marty is pushed to the limit with Roscoe's relationship with Lex. He thinks it's a bad relationship for his son, which is confirmed when Roscoe and Lex get drunk together.
| 32 | 8 | "Brinkmanship" | Daisy von Scherler Mayer | Theo Travers | March 9, 2014 | 0.640* |
The new pod tries to win over McClintock Media, which was presented by Clyde. Marty calls up Monica while Roscoe and Jeremiah are away while pushed by Jeannie to forgive Clyde. Doug invites Caitlin to an art gallery that the original pod is going to and Jeannie tells him it is basically a date but then things take a drastic turn when Sarah invites herself along: Sarah gives him the choice whether to fully be with her or to end it. Clyde and Marty reconcile.
| 33 | 9 | "Zhang" | Stephen Hopkins | Matthew Carnahan | March 16, 2014 | 0.734 |
Lukas takes Marty, Jeannie, Doug, and Clyde through a tour of his hometown while the rest of the pod stays and helps Monica out. Lukas unveils that Dre's way to organize money is not some big Chinese investor called Zhang, but a Ghetto money lender. Monica is interested in WON (“Wholesome Organic Nutrition”), some new kind of nutrition. Roscoe and Lex fight over whether to go to a krumping event or not, and when they end up going, Lex singles out and humiliates Roscoe in front of a group of older dancers.
| 34 | 10 | "Comeuppance" | Stephen Hopkins | Wesley S. Nickerson III | March 23, 2014 | 0.519* |
Jeannie goes to an old friend in order to secure a huge government contract for the firm. She is advised to re-evaluate some the firm's clients, namely to get rid of DollaHyde if she wants the contract because Lukas still is big in drugs. Marty continues business with Dollahyde, but it is taken too far ending with unexpected results when they're attacked and shot in their car. Dre survives, but Lukas dies. Doug makes a move on Caitlin after discovering trouble in her own personal life, but blows it. Clyde tries to manipulate Monica's golden ticket client in order to one up her in their ongoing feud. Clyde does drugs with Marissa McClintock.
| 35 | 11 | "Together" | Stephen Hopkins | David Walpert | March 30, 2014 | 0.757 |
Jeannie and Marty suspect that Dre was behind the attack/murder, but Jeannie gets emotional after the tragedy. Marty confronts Dre as well as his wife. Dre's wife threatens him. Doug tries to win Sarah back and succeeds, then finds out she had an abortion but that she isn't sure whether or not it was his. Clyde learns that Marissa has sold McClintock media without telling him and breaks up with her. Monica gets caught submitting fake health records for WON, then insults Jeannie about it. Jeannie and Marty get drunk together and talk about what happened in Vegas. After they have sex, Marty tells her that he loves her.
| 36 | 12 | "Joshua" | Matthew Carnahan | Matthew Carnahan | April 6, 2014 | 0.731 |
The FBI begins to search Kaan & Associates based on a warrant from Jeannie's friend; Jeannie and Marty want a relationship together, but her indiscretions may compromise everything. Roscoe and Lex break up. Jeannie admits that she tipped the FBI when they don't find a thing on DollaHyde but the Food deals. Jeannie is cleared, but Marty is taken in for questioning. In order for the company not to close, Marty has to resign and get out. He does so, drives away, and walks into the desert. Jeannie does not have the courage to tell him that she wants him.

- Denotes that individual episode ratings were unavailable, so the Showtime network primetime average is listed instead.

=== Season 4 (2015) ===
| No. overall | No. in season | Title | Directed by | Written by | Original release date | US viewers (millions) |
|---|---|---|---|---|---|---|
| 37 | 1 | "At the End of the Day, Reality Wins" | Matthew Carnahan | Matthew Carnahan | January 11, 2015 | 0.723 |
After being released from a short stint in prison, Marty returns to the struggling Kaan & Associates. Jeannie tells Marty she is pregnant and involved with an old flame, Edwin. Marty tells Jeannie he wants her to leave once the company gains financial footing since he doesn't believe they can work together given their past. The team attends a funeral to attempt to sign a new client. Marty is having sex with Denna, a highly successful white knight investor.
| 38 | 2 | "I'm a Motherfucking Scorpion, That's Why" | Daisy von Scherler Mayer | David Walpert | January 18, 2015 | 0.566 |
The team continues to struggle to stay afloat. Flashbacks show Marty in prison and the team on the outside working to set up their big new fish - a young electric car CEO, Ellis, who was in prison with Marty. Jeannie tells Marty the baby is his.
| 39 | 3 | "Entropy is Contagious" | Daisy von Scherler Mayer | Matthew Carnahan | January 25, 2015 | 0.645 |
Marty and the team head to Seattle where Marty and Jeannie have different views on their clients business; Doug believes that Sarah is emotionally unstable.
| 40 | 4 | "We Can Always Just Overwhelm the Vagus Nerve with Another Sensation" | Victor Nelli, Jr. | David Walpert | February 1, 2015 | 0.441 |
Marty is able to get Ellis to agree to a partnership between him and an old foe, Maya, who is a social idealist and brilliant engineer. All he has to do is keep him on track before the big announcement; Jeannie starts looking for another job.
| 41 | 5 | "The Urge to Save Humanity is Almost Always a Front for the Urge to Rule" | Don Cheadle | Wesley S. Nickerson III | February 8, 2015 | 0.556 |
At a charity banquet, Marty tries to get Maya out of her partnership with Ellis. With the help of Denna, Marty uses Maya's own generosity against her.
| 42 | 6 | "Trust Me, I'm Getting Plenty of Erections" | John Dahl | Jessica Borsiczky | February 15, 2015 | 0.484 |
Marty and the pod work tirelessly to raise the stock value to a certain point as they stand to earn an extra 9.2 million dollars; Kelsey offers Jeannie a job; Roscoe continues his rebellious lifestyle.
| 43 | 7 | "The Next Olive Branch Goes Straight Up Your Ass" | Michael Uppendahl | Taii K. Austin | March 1, 2015 | 0.622 |
The extra millions Marty was promised are put in jeopardy as he realizes Monica has Ellis' ear; Jeannie is fed up with Marty and demands to remain at Kaan & Associates.
| 44 | 8 | "He Didn't Mean That, Natalie Portman" | Michael Winterbottom | Taii K. Austin | March 8, 2015 | 0.647 |
To get revenge on Ellis, Marty and Jeannie enlist Denna; Clyde is bothered by his father.
| 45 | 9 | "We're Going to Build a Mothership and Rule the Universe" | Michael Uppendahl | Theo Travers | March 15, 2015 | 0.723 |
Denna's $22 million equity injection gives her 60% of Kaan and Associates; Marty meets Denna's turn-around artist; Jeannie gets cold feet before meeting Marty's family.
| 46 | 10 | "Praise Money! Hallowed be Thy Name" | Michael Lehmann | Wesley S. Nickerson III | March 22, 2015 | 0.589 |
Marty uses the equity injection to acquire multiple competitors; Marty ignores Denna's request to not help a regional burger franchise that competes with a larger business deal of hers; revelation of Roscoe's handbag business being counterfeits causes trouble with his school friends; Clyde convinces Kelsey that they should be exclusive, dropping Doug from their oddly open three person relationship.
| 47 | 11 | "Everything's So Fucking Obvious, I'm Starting to Wonder Why We're Even Having This Conversation" | Daisy von Scherler Mayer | David Walpert | March 29, 2015 | 0.503 |
Denna undercuts Marty for ignoring her turn-around artist and for pursuing clients counter to her larger business; Roscoe is treated like a pariah at his school; Jeannie is offered the CFO position of a massive pharmaceutical company (another Denna deal to hurt Marty); when Clyde's father admits he faked cancer, he promptly dies of a heart attack while Clyde is admonishing him for being a terrible deceitful father.
| 48 | 12 | "You're Safely Sucking at the Triple-Venti Tits of the New Kaan & Associates" | Matthew Carnahan | Matthew Carnahan | March 29, 2015 | 0.503 |
Marty gets even with Denna by releasing her embarrassing family secrets; Denna withdraws her financing before Marty has locked down his recent acquisitions, but he eventually convinces them all to stay with him for a year to see they will get rich together; Marty rushes to Jeannie for the birth of their daughter; Jeannie takes the amazing pharma job.

=== Season 5 (2016) ===
| No. overall | No. in season | Title | Directed by | Written by | Original release date | US viewers (millions) |
|---|---|---|---|---|---|---|
| 49 | 1 | "Creative Destruction Phenomenon" | Matthew Carnahan | Matthew Carnahan | April 1, 2016 (online); April 10, 2016 (Showtime) | 0.399 |
Marty, Doug, and Clyde consult for Jeannie, in her new role as CFO of a pharmaceutical company called Davis/Dexter, while trying to be a good parent along with Marty to their new baby girl; Doug and Clyde fight for Jeannie's office. Skip tells Marty he is representing Kohl brothers and wants to buy K&A (and pay him to leave the business).
| 50 | 2 | "Game Theory" | Don Cheadle | David Walpert | April 17, 2016 | 0.418 |
In the hopes he can pick up a new client, Marty begrudgingly attends Doug's weekly Dungeons and Dragons game; Jeannie is slammed with sexual harassment allegations, which may affect her role as CFO.
| 51 | 3 | "Holacracy" | Daisy von Scherler Mayer | Matthew Carnahan | April 24, 2016 | 0.308 |
Jeannie rejoins the pod; Marty's new client pitches a new style of management; Clyde begins having relationship issues. Note: This episode contains animation by Anthony Francisco Schepperd.
| 52 | 4 | "End State Vision" | Daisy von Scherler Mayer | David Walpert | May 1, 2016 | 0.357 |
Marty and the pod do business with a potential murderer, whom Jeannie later goes on a date with; Doug tries to fulfill one of his life-long goals.
| 53 | 5 | "Above Board Metrics" | Gary B. Goldman | Wesley S. Nickerson III | May 8, 2016 | 0.258 |
The pod hits the high seas as they try to convince a cruise magnate to work with the Dushkin twins to create a party cruise-line.
| 54 | 6 | "Johari Window" | Don Cheadle | Theo Travers | May 15, 2016 | 0.383 |
Marty is angered at a client's secret as the firm takes on a hair company; Clyde is worried Jeannie will come between him and a new client, mayoral candidate Seth Buckley.
| 55 | 7 | "One-Eighty" | Jessica Borsiczky | Jessica Borsiczky | May 22, 2016 | 0.256 |
Marty tries to convince a client in the marijuana business to expand their company; Doug gives his Ted talk.
| 56 | 8 | "Tragedy of the Commons" | Craig Zisk | Sarah Walker | May 29, 2016 | 0.243 |
K&A are persuading a boy band D'ream Out Loud to re-sign a contract with CMG label. There are two break-ups in this episode: Jeannie with Seth (because he used her as an advantage in mayoral campaign without her consent) and Tess with Doug (because he hasn't called her for several days after a TED talk).
| 57 | 9 | "Violent Agreement" | Helen Hunt | David Walpert & Wesley S. Nickerson III | June 5, 2016 | 0.304 |
K&A are attempting to make an appointment with Kohl brothers to discuss their business plans in Cuba. In the meantime, Skip reveals to Marty that Kohl brothers have all essential information from Monica (because she hacked K&A e-mails using a spyware accidentally downloaded by Doug). Then Kohl brothers tell Marty and Skip that they will acquire the firm which gain their grandfather's holdings (repatriated after revolution) back.
| 58 | 10 | "No Es Facil" | Matthew Carnahan | Matthew Carnahan | June 12, 2016 | 0.307 |
Earlier, Marty was competing with Monica to sign a contract for Kohl brothers to build luxury hotel resort in Cuba, resulting in tie. Later Marty reveals he actually loves Cuban slow pace, mocks Skip (because he admits his loss and wants to cooperate with Marty again) and proposes to Jeannie (who eventually marries him).
