= Siino =

Siino is an Italian surname. Notable people with the surname include:

- Rosanne Siino (born 1962), Italian-American businesswoman and former Vice President of Communications for Netscape
- Salvatore Siino (1904–1963), Italian prelate of the Catholic Church
