= Beron =

Beron may refer to:

== People ==
- Grégory Beron (born 1989), French ice hockey defenceman
- Patty Beron, social media pioneer known for Sfgirl.com
- Petar Beron (died 1871), Bulgarian academic
- Petar Beron (politician) (born 1940), Bulgarian academic and politician

== Places ==
- Berón de Astrada Department, Argentina
- Beron Point, Antarctica
- Saint-Béron, France
