= Keegan Connor Tracy =

Canadian actress and author (born 1971)

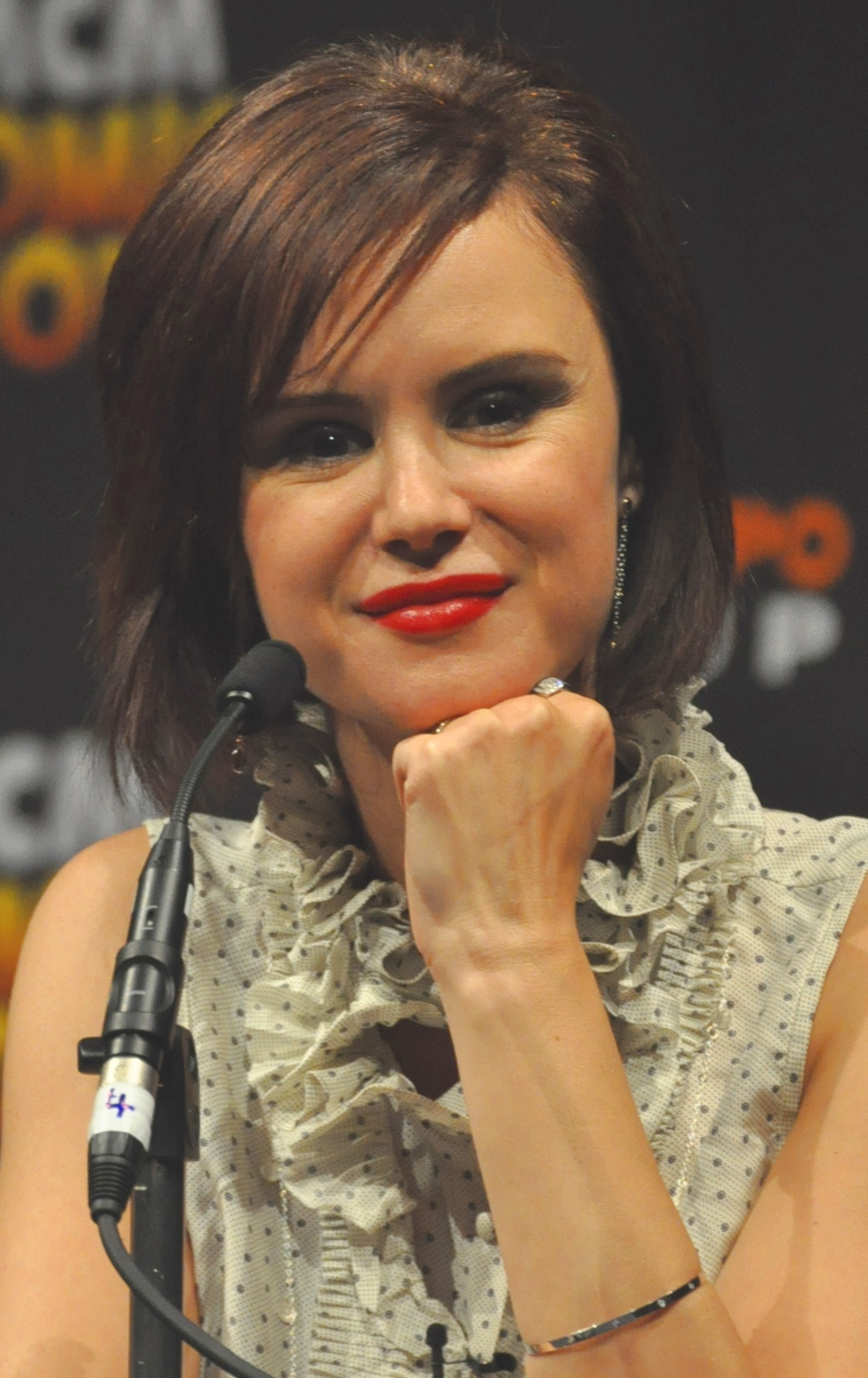
- Tracy in 2013
- Born: December 3, 1971 (age 54); Windsor, Ontario, Canada
- Education: Wilfrid Laurier University
- Occupations: Actress; author; director
- Years active: 1997–present
- Spouse: Ez Mitchell
- Children: 2

Keegan Connor Tracy (born December 3, 1971) is a Canadian actress, author and director. She earned recognition for her roles in the comedy-drama series Beggars and Choosers (1999–2000) and the supernatural horror films Final Destination 2 (2003) and White Noise (2005).

In the 2010s, Tracy appeared in the fantasy drama series Once Upon a Time (2011–2018), the drama horror series Bates Motel (2013–2016), the Descendants television franchise (2015–2019), and the Syfy fantasy series The Magicians (2016–2020). She also starred in the drama film Words and Pictures (2013), the zombie films Dead Rising: Watchtower (2015) and Dead Rising: Endgame (2016), and the horror film Z (2019).

== Early life and education ==
Keegan Connor Tracy was born in Windsor, Ontario, Canada. She graduated from St. Patrick's Catholic High School in Sarnia, Ontario. Tracy went on to obtain a degree in Social Psychology from Wilfrid Laurier University in Waterloo, Ontario, Canada. While she was at the university, she spent a year working in Europe.

== Career ==
Tracy made her acting debut in 1997, in the television series Viper. She made her feature film debut as a minor role in the 1999 crime thriller film Double Jeopardy. She subsequently appeared in films such as Duets (2000) and 40 Days and 40 Nights (2002). After guest roles in numerous television series, such as The New Addams Family, Tracy had a series regular role as Audrey Malone in the Showtime comedy-drama series Beggars and Choosers, which aired from 1999 to 2000.

Tracy later appeared in the drama series Da Vinci's Inquest (2002–2005), for which she received nominations for a Leo Award as well as a Gemini Award at the 17th Gemini Awards. She starred as Diane Hughes in the science fiction series Jake 2.0 (2003–2004). For her performance, she received a nomination for the Leo Award for Best Lead Performance by a Female in Dramatic Series. Tracy also appeared as a guest on the television series The 4400, Stargate SG-1, Supernatural, Psych, and Battlestar Galactica.

Tracy received further recognition for appearing as Kat Jennings in the supernatural horror film Final Destination 2 (2003). She continued to appear in supporting roles as Mirabelle Keegan in the supernatural horror film White Noise (2005) and Ellen in the drama film Words and Pictures (2013).

Tracy found greater success for her recurring roles on various television series. From 2011 to 2018, she appeared as the Blue Fairy, also known as Mother Superior, in the ABC fantasy drama series Once Upon a Time. From 2013 to 2016, she recurred as Miss Blaire Watson, the teacher to a young Norman Bates (Freddie Highmore), in the A&E drama horror series Bates Motel. From 2016 to 2020, she had a recurring role as Professor Eleanor Lipson in the Syfy fantasy drama series The Magicians. For her performance in the latter, she received a nomination for the ACTRA Award.

Tracy starred as Jordan Blair in the action zombie film Dead Rising: Watchtower (2015) and its sequel, Dead Rising: Endgame (2016). She also portrayed an adult version of Queen Belle in the Disney Channel Original Movie fantasy film Descendants (2015). She reprised her role in the sequels, Descendants 2 (2017) and Descendants 3 (2019).

In 2016, Tracy published her first children's book, titled Mommy's 26 Careers. In September 2018, she released another children's book, titled This is a Job for Mommy!: An A-Z Adventure. In 2020, she starred in the horror film, Z, about a family who is terrorized by their son Kevin Parsons (Sean Rogerson)’s imaginary friend Z (Luke Moore). The film "was such a huge emotional journey for me and I had to sort of sequester myself a lot to stay in that woman’s mental and emotional space," she said. In 2023, she participated as one of the panelists in Canada Reads, championing Michael Christie's novel Greenwood.

== Filmography ==
=== Film ===
Year	Title	Role	Notes
1999	Double Jeopardy	Boutique Saleswoman	
2000	Duets	Sheila	
2001	Kill Me Later	Heather	
2001	Out of Line	Claire Carrol	
2002	Blackwoods	Dawn / Molly	
2002	40 Days and 40 Nights	Mandy	
2003	Final Destination 2	Kat Jennings	
2003	A Problem with Fear	Vicky	
2005	White Noise	Mirabelle Keegan	
2005	Chaos	Marnie Rollins	
2006	The Net 2.0	Z.Z. Jackson	
2007	Oma's Quilt	Mom (voice)	Short film
2007	Numb	Mt. Sinai Nurse	
2007	Betsy Bubblegum's Journey Through Yummi-Land	Mindy Mint Chocolate Chip (voice)	
2008	Bratz Girls Really Rock	Liona (voice)	
2009	My Little Pony: Twinkle Wish Adventure	Whimsey (voice)	
2010	Smokin' Aces 2: Assassins' Ball	Vicky Salerno	
2012	The Company You Keep	Jim Grant's Secretary	
2013	Words and Pictures	Ellen	
2013	Embrace of the Vampire	Daciana	
2015	Dead Rising: Watchtower	Jordan Blair	
2016	Dead Rising: Endgame	Jordan Blair	
2019	Z	Elizabeth Parsons	
2025	Night of the Reaper	Elizabeth Talbot	
2025	Bodycam	The Mother	

=== Television ===
Year	Title	Role	Notes
1997–1999	Viper	Darlene Ross / Charmayne Grimes	2 episodes
1998	Breaker High	Yvette	Episode: "Lord of the Butterflies"
1998	Three	Eve	Episode: "The Games"
1998	First Wave	Nicole	Episode: "Hypnotic"
1998	The Net	Nadine	Episode: "Jump Vector"
1998	The New Addams Family	Consuela	Episode: "Morticia's Dilemma"
1998	Millennium	Lhasa	Episode: "Omerta"
1998–2001	Cold Squad	Waitress / Brooke Givens	2 episodes
1999	Night Man	Angel in Black	2 episodes
1999	Seven Days	Claire	Episode: "Parker.com"
1999–2000	Beggars and Choosers	Audrey Malone	Main role; 17 episodes
2000	Hollywood Off-Ramp	Unknown	Episode: "Screenplay By"
2001	Strange Frequency	Kim	Episode: "My Generation"
2002	Dark Angel	Rain	Episode: "Love in Vein"
2002–2005	Da Vinci's Inquest	Jackie	2 episodes
2003	Mob Princess	Patti	Television film
2003–2004	Jake 2.0	Diane Hughes	Main role; 16 episodes
2004	The Days	Francesca	Episode: "Day 1,370: Part 2"
2005	The Collector	Julia Mars	Episode: "The Tour Guide"
2005	The 4400	Alison Driscoll	2 episodes
2005	Killer Instinct	Rosie	Episode: "O Brother, Where Art Thou"
2006	Stargate SG-1	Dr. Redden	Episode: "Uninvited"
2006	Three Moons Over Milford	Hannah	Episode: "Confessions of a Dangerous Moon"
2006	Dark Storm	Sam	Television film
2006	Her Fatal Flaw	Brooke	Television film
2006	A Daughter's Conviction	Erin	Television film
2006–2019	Supernatural	Karen Giles / Sera Siege / Witch	3 episodes
2007	Psych	Priscilla Osterman	Episode: "Cloudy... with a Chance of Murder"
2007–2009	Battlestar Galactica	Jeanne	9 episodes
2009	The Building	Lilly	Television film
2010	Life Unexpected	Jenny	Episode: "Home Inspected"
2010	Eureka	Dr. Viccelli	Episode: "Stoned"
2011	V	Eileen Rounick	Episode: "Serpent's Tooth"
2011–2018	Once Upon a Time	Blue Fairy / Mother Superior	36 episodes
2011–2019	Superbook	Eve / Esther (voice)	4 episodes
2013	Jinxed	Mrs. Murphy	Television film
2013–2016	Bates Motel	Miss Blaire Watson	9 episodes
2014–2015	Heartland	Aunt Crystal	2 episodes
2015	Backstrom	Cristin Kelly	Episode: "Give 'Til It Hurts"
2015	Exchange Student Zero	Lucinda (voice)	4 episodes
2015	My Life as a Dead Girl	Kim	Television film
2015	Descendants	Queen Belle	Television film
2016	Motive	Heather	Episode: "Remains to Be Seen"
2016–2017	Ready Jet Go!	Dr. Rafferty (voice)	4 episodes
2016–2020	The Magicians	Professor Lipson	19 episodes
2017	Garage Sale Mystery: The Art of Murder	Tina	Television film
2017	Descendants 2	Queen Belle	Television film
2018	Super Dinosaur	Agent Winder / Teen Girl (voice)	Episode: "The Great Race"
2019	A Series of Unfortunate Events	Brucie	2 episodes
2019	Valley of the Boom	Rosanne Siino	2 episodes
2019	Morning Show Mysteries: Death by Design	Jasmine / Marian	Television film
2019	Descendants 3	Queen Belle	Television film
2020	The Twilight Zone	Gloria	Episode: "A Small Town"
2021	Harry & Meghan: Escaping the Palace	Lady Victoria	Television film
2022	Blockbuster	Rene	4 episodes
2023	Creepshow	Marcia	Episode: "To Grandmother's House We Go"
2025	Providence Falls	Samael	3 episodes
2026	Coven Academy	Tamora	6 episodes

== Awards and nominations ==
Year	Award	Category	Nominated work	Result	Ref.
2002	Leo Awards	Best Supporting Performance by a Female in Dramatic Series	Da Vinci's Inquest	Won	
2002	Gemini Awards	Best Performance by an Actress in a Guest Role in a Dramatic Series	Da Vinci's Inquest	Nominated	
2004	Leo Awards	Best Lead Performance by a Female in Dramatic Series	Jake 2.0	Nominated	
2012	Leo Awards	Best Guest Performance by a Female in a Dramatic Series	Once Upon a Time	Nominated	
2018	ACTRA Awards	Best Actress	The Magicians	Nominated	
