= Fenne =

Fenne is the name of:

== Surname ==
- Gisle Fenne (born 1963), Norwegian biathlete
- Hilde Fenne (born 1993), Norwegian biathlete
- Michael Fenne, alias of David Kim Stanley

== Given name ==
- Fenne Lily, Dorset-born, Bristol-based folk singer-songwriter
- Fenne Verrecas, Miss Earth delegate from Brazil
