= Asshole: How I Got Rich and Happy by Not Giving a Shit About You =

2008 book by Martin Kihn

- Author: Martin Kihn
- Language: English
- Publisher: Penguin
- Publication date: March 2008 (UK)
- Pages: 256
- ISBN: 0-14-103105-0

Asshole: How I Got Rich and Happy by Not Giving a Shit About You is a 2008 spoof self-help book and memoir by American author Martin Kihn. The book's title in the U.S. was modified to A$$hole: How I Got Rich & Happy by Not Giving a Damn About Anyone & How You Can, Too.

== Content ==
In corporate America, if you are ambitious, or if you just want to go for the big money, it more than helps to be an asshole.

— Marty Kihn

The first line of Marty Kihn's book, is "I was the nicest guy in the world and it was killing me." Kihn, who works for a marketing company, is told by his boss that unless he started "playing hardball", they were going to demote him and upgrade a colleague Kihn calls "The Nemesis" to a window office. So to save his career, Kihn decides to turn himself into an asshole, and in telling his story, he describes exactly how the reader can follow his lead.

To become an asshole, Kihn builds a team, consisting of an acting coach, life coach and both personal and dog trainer – to help "master the art of assholism." Kihn then creates a ten-step "assholism" program which involves "ignoring other peoples' feelings, never saying sorry, dressing in black silk and only eating red meat." Other tasks saw Kihn signing up to the National Rifle Association, learning kickboxing, screaming at colleagues and eating garlic bagels on public transport. Additionally, Kihn takes inspiration from famous figures whom he considers "assholes" such as: Donald Trump, Rudy Giuliani, Martha Stewart, David Letterman, Ayn Rand, Nicole Kidman, Niccolò Machiavelli, Scarface and Paris Hilton. He also takes inspiration from Ayn Rand's The Fountainhead and The Virtue of Selfishness.

In speaking on his motivations for compiling the work, Kihn stated:

I'd spent a lifetime seeing therapists and psychiatrists, and following things like The Warrior Diet. I guess I wanted to parody those types of books and move away from the whiny, self-centred, introspective stuff towards real action.

In the end, he is successful. By "finding the balls to act like an asshole, he crushes The Nemesis", gets a promotion, then nets a large sum of cash, and a second home into the bargain, by selling the book to Hollywood for a six-figure sum. Warner Brothers also paid $500,000 for the film rights to his memoirs before he'd even written them.

=== Martin Kihn’s Ten Steps to Becoming An Asshole ===
- 1. Fake it ‘til you make it – Act confident, pushy and assertive, even if you’re not. Kihn hired an acting coach to help him lose his default "nice guy" mannerisms. He learned to replace his smile with a thrust-out chin, a glare or a yawn.
- 2. Find asshole role models – Pay close attention to assholes at work, on TV or in the street and copy their behaviour. Kihn studied Tony "Scarface" Montana’s body language and also drew inspiration from Donald Trump, a man in his building with a tattoo on his face and "people who attend NRA conventions".
- 3. Hire a life coach – Fill your head with aggressive, asshole thoughts through "negative meditation". Use visualisation techniques to imagine the new callous, powerful, asshole you.
- 4. Become the alpha dog – Learn dominant, intimidating behaviour by observing dogs and episodes of TV’s The Dog Whisperer.
- 5. Be a fighter, not a lover – Use pain, caffeine, energy drinks and a red meat only diet to hone your body into "a walking sphincter". Take boxing lessons.
- 6. Show no interest in others – Be the centre of your own universe. Interrupt others when they speak. Always speak loudly – if it’s a phone call, put them on speakerphone.
- 7. Criticise in public, praise in private – Undermine others, particularly if it takes the heat off you. Use subtle mind games to manipulate others and keep them on-side. Total confusion will make victimization easier.
- 8. Keep your eyes on the prize – Remain focused to the point where nothing else matters. Don’t waste time with people if they can’t help you on your way.
- 9. Never, ever admit a mistake – Lie if necessary, but always maintain an air of infallibility.
- 10. Leap before you look – Instead of whining and being introspective, take action. You can’t think your way into the right action; you have to act your way into the right thinking.

== Reviews ==
In reviewing the work, Booklist remarked that "Kihn's got a great ear for dialogue – and a comedic sense worthy of Second City", while Publishers Weekly stated that "like an above-average Adam Sandler movie, this mix of racy humor and overt sentiment will probably get both a bigger audience, and less credit, than it deserves."

Robert Sutton, author of New York Times bestseller The No Asshole Rule gave the book a positive review, declaring "A$$hole is one of the funniest books I've ever read, and "remarkably useful in a sick sort of way." Additionally, Rory Freeman, co-author of The New York Times bestseller Skinny Bitch, described the text as "remarkably profane, laugh-out-loud funny, and surprisingly sentimental", while John Alexander, author of How To Become an Alpha Male, opined that "through humor and vivid storytelling, Martin Kihn takes you through that journey until he discovers an astonishing lesson."
