= House of Lies =

American television series

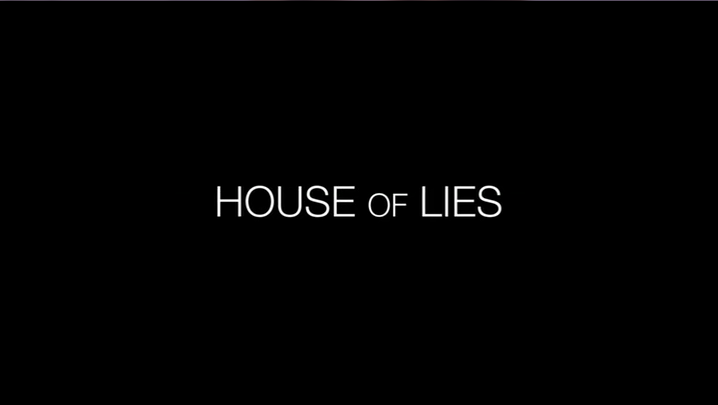
- Genre: Comedy drama
- Created by: Matthew Carnahan
- Based on: House of Lies by Martin Kihn
- Starring: Don Cheadle; Kristen Bell; Ben Schwartz; Josh Lawson; Dawn Olivieri; Donis Leonard Jr.; Glynn Turman
- Country of origin: United States
- Original language: English
- No. of seasons: 5
- No. of episodes: 58 (list of episodes)

Production
- Executive producers: Matthew Carnahan; Jessika Borsiczky; Stephen Hopkins; Don Cheadle
- Running time: 30 minutes
- Production companies: Crescendo Productions; Totally Commercial Films (seasons 1–3); Refugee Productions; Matthew Carnahan Circus Products; Showtime Networks

Original release
- Network: Showtime
- Release: January 8, 2012 – June 12, 2016

House of Lies is an American comedy drama television series created by Matthew Carnahan. The show, which premiered on Showtime on January 8, 2012, is based on the 2005 book of the same name by Martin Kihn. It follows a group of management consultants who stop at nothing to get business deals done. On May 17, 2016, Showtime cancelled the series after five seasons, with the series finale airing June 12, 2016.

== Premise ==
The show focuses on both the personal and business lives of Marty Kaan, a manipulative, charming and opportunistic management consultant.

Originally, Marty was a highly successful partner at consultancy firm Galweather Stearn, where he headed up a pod consisting of engagement manager Jeannie van der Hooven, and associates Clyde Oberholt and Doug Guggenheim. He later leaves this position to head up his own firm, Kaan & Associates.

In addition to the questionable business practices of Marty and his team, the series also focuses on Marty's personal life. He deals with his disagreeable management consultant ex-wife Monica, his retired-psychiatrist father Jeremiah and his confidently flamboyant son Roscoe. The main character, Marty, often breaks the fourth wall; he talks to the viewers in a freeze-frame bit in which he alone moves and the others in the background 'freeze' but continue where they left off. Alternatively, he talks to the audience while everyone moves but the others seem oblivious to the fact that he is on a monologue.

== Plot ==
Season	Episodes	Originally released	
Season	Episodes	First released	Last released
1	12	January 8, 2012	April 1, 2012
2	12	January 13, 2013	April 7, 2013
3	12	January 12, 2014	April 6, 2014
4	12	January 11, 2015	March 29, 2015
5	10	April 10, 2016	June 12, 2016

The series follows Marty Kaan (Don Cheadle), a manipulative, charming and opportunistic management consultant, and a partner at consulting firm Galweather-Stern in Los Angeles. He leads a team of associates consisting of Jeannie van der Hooven (Kristen Bell), Clyde Oberholt (Ben Schwartz), and Doug Guggenheim (Josh Lawson). Marty's ex-wife Monica (Dawn Olivieri) is also a management consultant working for a rival firm. Marty and his pod travel to New York to win the business of Metrocapital, an enormous banking institution. Marty is ultimately able to win over the company's prickly CEO but humiliates the CFO Greg Norbert (Greg Germann) in the process. In retaliation, Norbert suggests that Metrocapital acquire Galweather-Stern to become an in-house consulting group, guaranteeing mass layoffs for most of the company. senior partner Skip Galweather (Richard Schiff) has it out for Marty and is keen on seeing the merger happen while Galweather-Stern's CEO "The Rainmaker" (Griffin Dunne) has Marty's back and wants to see the merger gone—however, it's ultimately revealed that the Rainmaker is using Marty to get rid of Skip. With the acquisition nearly guaranteed, Marty attempts to leverage credible accusations of sexual harassment against the Rainmaker. During the firm's gala in celebration of the merger, Jeannie reveals she was one of many of the Rainmaker's victims. Metrocapital calls off the merger and the Rainmaker is put on leave. As the firm celebrates, Marty and Jeannie share a drink and subsequently black out.

Weeks later, Jeannie returns to work but she and Marty can't remember what happened the night of the gala. She has hazy memories of sleeping with Marty and telling him she loves him. The Rainmaker has been replaced with Julianne Hofschrager (Bess Armstrong), who gives Jeannie a meaningless promotion in a vain attempt to promote Galweather-Stern's new "era of women". Meanwhile, Marty and the pod travel to Las Vegas to sign a casino magnate named Pincus (Kevin Dobson). However, after that deal falls through, they manage to win the business of the childish owner of a rival casino, Michael Carlson (Mather Zickel). Marty feels increasingly despondent at Galweather-Stern and dreams of opening his own consulting firm; he begins planning the exit of him and his pod. Fed up with Michael Carlson's juvenile behavior, Marty takes the casino deal back to Pincus and intends on taking him to his new consultancy firm Kaan & Associates. This alienates Clyde, who instead chooses to work with Marty's ex-wife Monica at Kinsley & Associates. Doug decides it's in his best interests to stay at Galweather. Meanwhile, after wrestling with her emotions, Jeannie tells Marty she loves him. His reaction is hostile and she retracts her intention to join him at his new firm—leaving Marty alone at his new shop.

Marty is able to get Kaan & Associates jumpstarted but with none of his original pod. Clyde attempts to adjust to Monica's hectic work environment but ultimately leaves and rejoins Marty. At Galweather-Stern, Jeannie is placed in charge of her own pod, which includes Doug. The Rainmaker is brought back and intends on making Jeannie's life hell; Jeannie responds by leaking information about their business practices and resigning, destroying Galweather-Stern. Marty welcomes back Jeannie and Doug; he also makes Jeannie a 50% shareholder in Kaan & Associates. Their newest client is Dollahyde, a Los Angeles-based urban fashion brand headed by Dre Collins (Mekhi Phifer) and Lukas Frye (T.I.) with roots in drug dealing. The pod attempts to work both co-founders but their volatile relationship proves to be too much. Meanwhile, through an old friend Samantha (Rhea Seehorn), Jeannie is able to score a possible business deal with the Department of Justice—on the condition that K&A cuts ties with Dollahyde. Although Marty insists on pushing forward with Dollahyde, Jeannie gives Samantha access to K&A's files on Dollahyde in exchange for the DOJ deal. Lukas is murdered in what appears to be a gang hit, although Marty is certain that Dre was the orchestrator. With emotions running high, Marty and Jeannie sleep together and he tells her he loves her. Their bliss is cut short when K&A is raided by the FBI. Marty is arrested for unethical business practices that were uncovered and takes a plea deal that would give him six months in prison. Jeannie, horrified at what her actions have brought, is temporarily placed in charge of K&A.

Jeannie reveals that she is pregnant and the baby is Marty's. Meanwhile in prison, Marty meets the unstable CEO of Gage Motors Ellis Hightower (Demetri Martin) and is able to win his business for K&A. After being released, Marty returns to the firm, which has been in a dire financial situation since his prison sentence. He tells Jeannie that she should resign once the company is on solid footing again. Their relationship remains hostile after the events that put him in prison. Marty also begins hooking up with billionaire investor Denna Altshuler (Mary McCormack) in the hopes that she'll invest in K&A. Meanwhile, by reuniting Ellis with his former engineer (Alicia Witt), Gage Motors' stock soars. However, when Ellis refuses to pay Kaan & Associates for their work, Marty leverages evidence of Ellis' erratic behavior to win favor with Denna. Gage Motors collapses with Denna's help and she becomes a majority shareholder in K&A. The firm begins growing substantially with Denna's help, acquiring smaller management firms in its path. After Marty goes behind Denna's back to acquire a competing business, Denna attempts to push Marty out of the firm and orchestrates a job offer to Jeannie from a pharmaceutical company called Davis/Dexter. Marty gets Denna to withdraw her support from the company and manages to convince all the companies she helped acquire to stay the course in her absence. As Jeannie goes into labor, Marty is thrilled to tell her that they saved the company and she's going to be co-president—until Jeannie tells him that she took the job offer from Davis/Dexter.

Marty and Jeannie maintain a positive relationship as co-parents for their baby girl Pheobe. After making an unsuccessful ploy at ousting its CEO, Jeannie leaves Davis/Dexter and returns to K&A. After a night of binge-drinking, Marty also makes Doug and Clyde partners. Skip Galweather returns, representing the uber-wealthy fascist Kohl brothers, and expresses interest in purchasing 100% of Kaan & Associates. Marty and Jeannie consider a life outside of work, being there for their child. They attempt to acquire several businesses to build their portfolio for a greater payday. Jeannie begins having misgivings about the buyout. Marty proposes the Kohls expand their businesses into Cuba. The pod travels to Cuba but the embassy shuts down their plans for expansion. While exploring Havana, Marty falls in love with the slow pace of Cuban life. After telling Jeannie that they aren't going to sell their business, he asks her to marry him. Marty and Jeannie get married and leave Cuba, telling off Skip and the Kohl brothers.

== Cast and characters ==
=== Main cast ===
- Don Cheadle as Marty Kaan, the immoral and deceitful proprietor of consultancy firm Kaan & Associates. Before he started his own firm, he led a pod for Galweather-Stearn. Marty is willing to do anything to close the deal and, as such, alienates the vast majority of people he comes into contact with, a fact that he cares very little about. Due to questionable business practices, Marty spends several months in prison before the start of season 4, and this adds even more strain to his already-tense relationship with Roscoe and Jeremiah.
  - Cheadle also served as executive producer through his Crescendo Productions banner.
- Kristen Bell as Jeannie van der Hooven, a partner at Kaan & Associates with whom Marty has a complex relationship. She was part of Marty's pod before he left Galweather. She later led her own pod in Galweather before ditching them for Kaan & Associates, where she becomes a partner. Jeannie was inadvertently responsible for the FBI bust on Kaan & Associates. Consequently, Marty blames her for his stint in jail. In season 4, Jeannie is pregnant with Marty's child, but he is reluctant to be involved as he has not forgiven her.
- Ben Schwartz as Clyde Oberholt, a member of Marty's consultant pod who specialises in marketing and spin. He was part of Marty's pod before he left Galweather. He briefly became part of Monica's pod in Kinsley & Associates when he and Marty had a falling-out. He eventually worked his way into Kaan & Associates. He has a jealous, arrogant and often cruel personality, and very rarely shows any real emotions. Clyde struggles with drug addiction throughout the later seasons.
- Josh Lawson as Doug Guggenheim, a member of Marty's consultant pod who specialises in numerical analysis. He was part of Marty's pod before he left Galweather. After Marty left, he briefly became a part of Jeannie's pod before they both left for Kaan & Associates. It is also known that he graduated from Harvard, he is seen constantly reminding this fact to everyone. He marries Sarah (Jenny Slate) (Season 2) but after he sends her a drunken text message, she cleans out his bank accounts and leaves (Season 4).
- Dawn Olivieri as Monica Talbot (starring seasons 1–3, recurring seasons 4 & 5), an ex-partner at rival firm Kinsley & Associates, and Marty's ex-wife. She and Marty often taunt and abuse each other when they meet, and often engage in angry sex.
- Donis Leonard Jr. as Roscoe Kaan, the flamboyant 15-year-old son of Monica and Marty. He wears eyeliner and experimental clothing and often has an attitude problem towards his father. In season 4, it is shown that Roscoe has fallen in with the school burn-outs and has begun smoking marijuana.
- Glynn Turman as Jeremiah Kaan, Marty's ex-psychiatrist father and Roscoe's main caregiver. Jeremiah detests Monica, and is frequently forced to act as a mediator between her and Marty for Roscoe's sake. He is dating Chantelle, a much younger psychology student. The relationship has been happily accepted by the rest of the family.

=== Recurring cast ===
==== Season 1 ====
- John Aylward as K. Warren McDale, CEO/president of Metro-Capital.
- Griffin Dunne as Marco "The Rainmaker" Pelios, president, CEO, and senior partner at Galweather-Stearn.
- Megalyn Echikunwoke as April, Marty's law student girlfriend.
- Mo Gaffney as Principal Gita, principal of the school Roscoe attends.
- Greg Germann as Greg Norbert, CFO of Metro-Capital.
- Anna Camp as Rachel Norbert, wife, and then ex-wife of Greg Norbert.
- Richard Schiff as Harrison "Skip" Galweather, senior partner and co-founder of Galweather-Stearn.

==== Season 2 ====
- Bess Armstrong as Julianne Hofschrager, interim CEO of Galweather-Stearn.
- Adam Brody as Nate, CEO/president of an adult sex toy company.
- Kevin Dobson as Mr. Pincus, owner of the Emerald casino in Las Vegas.
- Lisa Edelstein as Brynn, assistant/political advisor for Carl Criswell.
- Taylor Gerard Hart as Alex Dushkin, co-owner of Las Vegas Nightclub War.
- Evan Hart as Kyle Dushkin, co-owner of Las Vegas Nightclub War.
- Ronete Levenson as Tessa, Monica's vegan chef ex-girlfriend.
- Nia Long as Tamara, Galweather & Stearn's newest employee and Marty's classmate from business school.
- Eden Malyn as Zanna, the pod's personal assistant.
- Michael McDonald as Carl Criswell, CEO/president of US National Bank.
- Elimu Nelson as Kevin, Tamara's husband.
- Jenny Slate as Sarah Guggenheim, Doug's girlfriend and, later, wife.
- Larenz Tate as Malcolm Kaan, Marty's brother.
- Mather Zickel as Michael Carlson, owner of the Vibrato casino in Las Vegas.

==== Season 3 ====
- Genevieve Angelson as Caitlyn Hobart, part of Marty's new pod.
- Eugene Cordero as Everett, part of Monica's pod.
- Brigid Coulter as the wife of Andrew "'Dre" Collins.
- Eliza Coupe as Marisa McClintock, the youngest of the McClintock family. She was founder of MediaWolfOnline newspaper and later became the chairwoman of entire McClintock Media Group after some help from Clyde.
- Ryan Gaul as Will, part of Marty's new pod.
- Rob Gleeson as Jeffrey, part of Marty's new pod.
- Lauren Lapkus as Benita Spire, part of Jeanie's new pod. She leaked info to the press that led to the demise of Galweather under The Rainmaker.
- Alice Hunter as Chantelle, a young PhD candidate who is dating Jeremiah.
- John Carroll Lynch as Gil Selby, one of Galweather-Stearn's senior partners.
- Mekhi Phifer as Andrew "Dre" Collins, cofounder of DollaHyde, a hip-hop fashion label. He was a former drug dealer.
- T.I. as Lukas Frye, cofounder of DollaHyde, a hip-hop fashion label. He was also a former drug dealer.
- Brad Schmidt as J.C., part of Jeanie's new pod.
- Daniel Stern as Robert Tretorn, CEO, president, and founder of Free Range Foods.
- Bex Taylor-Klaus as Lex, Roscoe's partner who turns out to be a bad influence on him.
- Milana Vayntrub as Christy, part of Monica's pod. She was arrested and fired for stabbing Monica in "Power"
- Rhea Seehorn as Samantha, Jeannie's friend at the Department of Justice

==== Season 4 ====
- Mary McCormack as Denna Altshuler, a tough, highly successful white knight investor and owner of Global Investments, who is also Marty's "fuck-buddy"
- Demetri Martin as Ellis Gage Hightower, a shark-in-the-waters businessman and godhead of electrics cars whom Marty befriends in prison, who also owns Gage Motors
- Valorie Curry as Kelsey, a confident computer programmer who both Clyde and Doug chase romantically
- Alicia Witt as Maya Lindholm, a brilliant engineer and former partner of Ellis Gage
- Fred Melamed as Harvey Oberholt, the father of Clyde, who has a difficult relationship with his son and is dying of cancer

==== Season 5 ====
- Brianna Baker as Tess Symington, Green Point owner, Dungeons & Dragons player and briefly Doug's girlfriend
- Steven Weber as Ron Zobel
- Wanda Sykes as Rita, Jeremiah's partner
- Glenn Howerton as Seth Buckley, a mayoral candidate, who has gotten romantically involved with Jeannie
- Donald Faison as Donald, friend and golfing partner of Marty
- Michael Cudlitz and Stacey Hinnen as Kohl brothers, businessmen who have business plans in Cuba and want to acquire K&A
- Nicky Whelan as Claire

== Production ==
The series is executive produced by Matthew Carnahan, Jessika Borsiczky, and Stephen Hopkins, with the pilot written by Carnahan and directed by Hopkins.

=== Development ===
On December 13, 2010, House of Lies was given a pilot order. On April 7, 2011, the series was given a 12 episode pick-up by Showtime. The series is based on Martin Kihn's book, House of Lies: How Management Consultants Steal Your Watch and Then Tell You the Time. David Nevins, president of entertainment at Showtime, announced during the 2011 Television Critics Association press tour that the show was set to premiere on January 8, 2012.

=== Casting ===
Casting announcements began in December 2010, with Don Cheadle as the first actor to be cast, as Marty Kaan, "a highly successful, cut-throat consultant who is never above using any means (or anyone) necessary to get his clients the information they want". The next actor to be cast was Dawn Olivieri who plays Monica, "Marty's crazy, pill-popping ex-wife and biggest professional competition as her consulting firm is No. 1 compared to Marty's No. 2." Ben Schwartz and Josh Lawson were cast next, Schwartz playing Clyde Oberholt, a member of Marty's team and his closest friend, and Lawson as Doug Guggenheim, Marty's Harvard-educated associate. Last cast were Kristen Bell, who plays Jeannie van der Hooven, "a razor-sharp, Ivy-League graduate who works at Marty’s firm", Donis Leonard Jr. as Roscoe Kaan, Marty's son, and Glynn Turman as Jeremiah Kaan, Marty's psychoanalyst father. Later, Richard Schiff was cast as Marty's boss.

=== House of Lies Live ===
On December 29, 2013, Showtime presented House of Lies Live which featured members of the main cast and guest actors on the show performing at the People's Improv Theater in the first broadcast of long form improv.

== Reception ==
Promotional poster for the first season of House of Lies.

Throughout its run, House of Lies received mixed reviews from critics.

Entertainment Weekly's Ken Tucker, reviewing the pilot episode, thought the show's premise "sounds terrific in concept", that "Cheadle and Bell are each in their own way exceedingly charming performers with a devilish aspect to their images", and that it has debuted at a good time: "at this time in history, who doesn't want to see undeservingly wealthy people get fleeced, or at least brought low by their avarice?" But ultimately Tucker found House of Lies wanting, writing that it is actually not "all that interesting", and that its "crucial weakness is its dead language". For Tucker, "there's no novelty or freshness in House of Lies' patter or its penis-placement" (the latter comment being a reference to House of Lies' "butt-load of the sort of sexual activity one can get away with on pay-cable"). He later included it on his Top 5 Worst TV Shows of 2012, taking the fourth spot.

In stark contrast, Matt Rouch, writing for TV Guide, thought that "as a pitiless, biting satire of the debauched state of American big business, it's no lie to call this one of the smartest, funniest shows of the new year", praising its being "[d]eeply cynical, garish in its raunchiness and always rudely, lewdly hilarious". It "swims in a shark tank of such appalling survival-of-the-nastiest bad behavior it could launch its own channel: Human Animal Planet". Where Tucker finds House of Lies' lines and dialogue poor, Rouch praises Don Cheadle's character's lines: Cheadle's character "often steps out of a freeze-frame to deliver scathing stylized asides to the audience, talking straight to the camera to teach us his lingo and soulless trade secrets". (By contrast, Tucker found these freeze-frame asides a "visual gimmick" and complained of derivative lines: "Creator Matthew Carnahan [...] loads his new show with lines that sound borrowed from Glengarry Glen Ross ("Closing is what I do!")."

Sarah Huges of The Independent called House of Lies "A Comedy for the One Per Cent," saying it's a "half-hour comedy about wealthy slicksters screening right in the middle of one of the biggest economic depressions America has experienced." Although calling the cast and production outstanding and funny in an artistic and technical way, the UK reception - by the standards of the Independent - seemed less positive than the rest. "House of Lies is asking us not simply to laugh at this bunch of chancers, but to admire them for the way in which they rip people off," she writes, calling for a check-up on corporate America.

== Awards and nominations ==
Awards and nominations for House of Lies
Year	Association	Category	Nominee(s)	Result
2012	Primetime Emmy Award	Outstanding Lead Actor in a Comedy Series	Don Cheadle	Nominated
2012	Golden Globe Award	Best Actor TV Series – Comedy or Musical	Don Cheadle	Won
2013	NAACP Image Award	Outstanding Actor in a Comedy Series	Don Cheadle	Won
2013	Critics' Choice Television Award	Best Actor in a Comedy Series	Don Cheadle	Nominated
2013	Primetime Emmy Award	Outstanding Lead Actor in a Comedy Series	Don Cheadle	Nominated
2013	Golden Globe Award	Golden Globe Award for Best Actor – Television Series Musical or Comedy	Don Cheadle	Nominated
2014	Golden Globe Award	Golden Globe Award for Best Actor – Television Series Musical or Comedy	Don Cheadle	Nominated
2014	Primetime Emmy Award	Outstanding Lead Actor in a Comedy Series	Don Cheadle	Nominated
2014	Primetime Emmy Award	Outstanding Art Direction for a Contemporary Program (Half-Hour or Less)	Episodes: "Wreckage", "Middlegame", "Zhang"	Won
2015	NAACP Image Award	Outstanding Comedy Series		Nominated
2015	Golden Globe Award	Golden Globe Award for Best Actor – Television Series Musical or Comedy	Don Cheadle	Nominated
2015	Primetime Emmy Award	Outstanding Lead Actor in a Comedy Series	Don Cheadle	Nominated
