= Trinity (American TV series) =

- Genre: Family drama
- Created by: Matthew Carnahan
- Starring: Louis Ferreira; Jill Clayburgh; John Spencer; Tate Donovan; Sam Trammell
- Composer: Martin Davich
- Country of origin: United States
- Original language: English
- No. of seasons: 1
- No. of episodes: 9 (5 unaired) (list of episodes)

Production
- Executive producer: John Wells
- Producers: Natalie Chaidez; Kristin Harms
- Running time: 60 minutes
- Production companies: John Wells Productions; Warner Bros. Television

Original release
- Network: NBC
- Release: October 16 – November 6, 1998

Trinity is an American family drama television series created by Matthew Carnahan that aired on the broadcast network NBC from October 16, 1998, to November 6, 1998. Only four of the first season's nine episodes were aired before the series was cancelled by NBC in March 1999. Among the main cast was Louis Ferreira, Jill Clayburgh, Tate Donovan, and Sam Trammell.

Two of the show's stars, Kim Raver and Bobby Cannavale, would also be cast in another NBC drama, Third Watch.

== Plot ==
Set in Hell's Kitchen, Manhattan, a detective from a working-class Irish Catholic family looks after his family members.

== Cast ==
=== Main ===
- Louis Ferreira as Bobby McCallister
- Jill Clayburgh as Eileen McCallister
- John Spencer as Simon McCallister
- Tate Donovan as Kevin McCallister
- Sam Trammell as Liam McCallister
- Kim Raver as Clarissa McCallister
- Bonnie Root as Amanda McCallister
- Charlotte Ross as Fiona McCallister

=== Recurring ===
- Alicia Coppola as Det. Patricia Damiana
- Bobby Cannavale as Joe
- Dennis Boutsikaris as Josh

== Episodes ==
No.	Title	Directed by	Written by	Original release date	Prod. code
1	"Pilot"	Michael Caton-Jones	Matthew Carnahan	October 16, 1998	475136
Bobby links a murder victim to the boss of Liam.
2	"In a Yellow Wood"	Rod Holcomb	John Wells	October 23, 1998	467301
Bobby risks the wrath of his lieutenant when he starts working on a case that wasn't assigned to him. Amanda finds out that she is pregnant. Fiona reunites with an old friend when she attends a wedding. A bag full of money is given to Liam.
3	"No Secrets"	Christopher Misiano	Lisa Melamed	October 30, 1998	467302
Bobby gets involved in an undercover operation involving the FBI. Amanda contemplates having an abortion. Liam buys a boat with the money.
4	"In Loco Parentis"	R. W. Goodwin	Matthew Carnahan	November 6, 1998	467303
Bobby and his partner gets a report about a missing child. Kevin has to adjust to a new priest.
5	"Hang Man Down"	Darnell Martin	Natalie Chaidez	UNAIRED	467304
Liam meets a friend from childhood. Bobby wants to raise Amanda's unborn baby.
6	"...To Forgive, Divine"	Christopher Misiano	Edward Allen Bernero	UNAIRED	467305
The McCallister family prepares for Thanksgiving dinner. Kevin visits a parishioner. Eileen's mother visits from Florida.
7	"Having Trouble with the Language"	Anthony Drazan	John Ridley	UNAIRED	467306
Joe wants Fiona to just enjoy life. Liam has problems with women. Clarissa finds out information about her birth mother.
8	"Breaking In, Breaking Out, Breaking Up, Breaking Down"	Alan Taylor	Terri Kopp	UNAIRED	467307
Kevin helps a troubled youth. Bobby finds a link between murders while checking old cases. Fiona has to choose between lovers. Amanda and an Irish nanny become friends.
9	"The Patron Saint of Impossible Causes"	R. W. Goodwin	Matthew Carnahan	UNAIRED	467308
Liam meets a young woman who is staying at her parents' apartment. Simon and Bobby have a disagreement about a murder case from years ago. Eileen returns to college to finish her education.

== Awards and nominations ==
Year	Award	Recipient(s)	Result
1999	Primetime Emmy Award for Outstanding Main Title Theme Music	Martin Davich	Won
1999	Artios Awards for Best Casting for TV, Dramatic Pilot	John Frank Levey, Mark Saks, Barbara Miller	Nominated
