= 2004 Webby Awards =

US internet awards ceremony

The 8th Annual Webby Awards was held on May 12, 2004. Due to cutbacks in the Webby event budget resulting from the 2002 Internet bubble, the decision was made to hold this year's ceremony entirely online (a step further than the 2003 Webbys which had already been partially online). Judging was provided by the 480-person International Academy of Digital Arts and Sciences.

== Nominees and winners ==
(from http://www.webbyawards.com/winners/2004)

Category	Winner	People's Voice winner	Other nominees
Community	Wikipedia	LiveJournal	fictionalley.com
Community	Wikipedia	LiveJournal	Friendster
Community	Wikipedia	LiveJournal	SuicideGirls
Games	Yohoho! Puzzle Pirates (Archived 18 May 2004 via Wayback)	BrettspielWelt (Board Game World) (Archived 20 May 2004 via Wayback)	Samorost (Archived 25 May 2004 via Wayback)
Games	Yohoho! Puzzle Pirates (Archived 18 May 2004 via Wayback)	BrettspielWelt (Board Game World) (Archived 20 May 2004 via Wayback)	Star Wars Galaxies (Archived 3 June 2004 via Wayback)
Games	Yohoho! Puzzle Pirates (Archived 18 May 2004 via Wayback)	BrettspielWelt (Board Game World) (Archived 20 May 2004 via Wayback)	There (Archived 18 May 2004 via Wayback)
NetArt	Access	Gravity	communimage
NetArt	Access	Gravity	Uncle Roy All Around You
NetArt	Access	Gravity	velvet-strike
Weird	Carstuckgirls.com		A Portrait of You and Stevie Nicks
Weird	Carstuckgirls.com		Cliff Pickover's Reality Carnival
Weird	Carstuckgirls.com		Fortean Times
Weird	Carstuckgirls.com		weirdomusic.com
This table is not complete, please help to complete it from material on this page.
