= The Vegas Job =

- Starring: The Who; Roger Daltrey; John Entwistle; Pete Townshend; John Bundrick; Zak Starkey
- Music by: The Who
- Production companies: (United States) Passport Entertainment (United Kingdom) Video Film Express
- Distributed by: (United States) Passport Entertainment (United Kingdom) Video Film Express
- Release date: 7 November 2006
- Running time: 115 min.
- Language: English

The Vegas Job is a concert film of the Who's performance on October 29, 1999, at the MGM Grand Garden Arena in Las Vegas, Nevada, at the infamous Pixelon launch event. Pixelon claimed that the performance was streamed live over the Internet to over 1 million viewers and to the video screen on One Times Square; it was reported that thousands of viewers were unable to watch the live stream due to technology failures. The DVD was certified Gold in Canada after selling 5,000 units.

== Songs performed ==
1. "I Can't Explain"
2. "Substitute"
3. "Anyway, Anyhow, Anywhere"
4. "Pinball Wizard"
5. "See Me, Feel Me"
6. "Baba O'Riley"
7. "My Wife"
8. "5:15"
9. "Behind Blue Eyes"
10. "Who Are You"
11. "Magic Bus"
12. "Won't Get Fooled Again"
13. "The Kids Are Alright"
14. "My Generation"

== Special features ==
The DVD included interviews with Roger Daltrey and John Entwistle, the story behind the Pixelon fiasco, and interviews with the audience prior to start of the concert.
