= 2000 Webby Awards =

US internet awards ceremony

Held in San Francisco's Masonic Center for a crowd of 3,000 invited guests, the 2000 Webby Awards were widely considered the peak of the Webby Awards and a watershed of dot-com party culture. The event took place May 11, 2000, shortly before many of the event's perennial nominees and participants suffered business failures in the dot com crash.

The attendant ceremony and surrounding events were described in the press as "Hollywood-style" and a "bacchanal.". Others complained that the event was too serious and less fun than in its earlier, freewheeling days, and was too much of a "corporate mixer." Alan Cumming was the master of ceremonies. The theme was The Time Machine, from the H. G. Wells novel. Pre-awards entertainment included guest "fluffers" with feather dusters, fake paparazzi who would excitedly take pictures of arriving guests, and dance troupes from Project Bandaloop scaling and rappelling down the face of the theater building to Capacitor delivering awards. Some nominees dressed up as astronauts carrying their corporate banners as flags, and in headdresses and silver metallic wigs. Google's representatives arrived in costume as they had the year before, rolling onstage in inline skates to accept their award. Guerrilla marketers from companies that did not get into the event stood on the sidewalk outside to attract attention.

The 27 award winners received a prize of $30,000 each, a first for the event. As in years past, award speeches were limited to five words. Presenters included Sandra Bernhard, John Perry Barlow, Mahir, and Tina Brown. Among the new additions to the judging panel were Robin Williams, David Bowie, and Deepak Chopra.

The afterparty took place in nearby Grace Cathedral and in Huntington Park across the street, which had been covered with tents and served food and alcohol donated by restaurants throughout the city. Held on top of Nob Hill, one of the town's largest enclaves of old money, the event took a year to plan and several months of permits. Despite extensive community outreach, and a promise by organizers to pay for restoration of the Fontana delle Tartarughe, a dilapidated fountain in the park as a goodwill gesture, some local residents were vocal in their resentment of the brashness of the Internet industry, and canvassed the neighborhood with protest leaflets.

Future award events were more somber. By the next year's event, one fifth of the 2000 nominees were out of business, and more than half of the winners had been sold, suffered layoffs, or failed. By 2002, there was not enough money available to pay for a live event.

== Nominees and winners ==
(from)

Category	Winner	People's Voice winner	Other nominees
Activism	Adbusters (http://www.adbusters.com)	The Hunger Site (Archived 11 May 2000 via Wayback)	American Civil Liberties Union (Archived 11 May 2000 via Wayback)
Activism	Adbusters (http://www.adbusters.com)	The Hunger Site (Archived 11 May 2000 via Wayback)	Protest Net (Archived 10 May 2000 via Wayback)
Activism	Adbusters (http://www.adbusters.com)	The Hunger Site (Archived 11 May 2000 via Wayback)	The Action Network (Archived 10 May 2000 via Wayback)
Art	Web Stalker (http://www.backspace.org/iod/iod4Winupdates.html)	SFMOMA Presents Bill Viola (Archived 21 June 2000 via Wayback)	EasyLife.Org (Archived 10 May 2000 via Wayback)
Art	Web Stalker (http://www.backspace.org/iod/iod4Winupdates.html)	SFMOMA Presents Bill Viola (Archived 21 June 2000 via Wayback)	netomat (Archived 10 May 2000 via Wayback)
Art	Web Stalker (http://www.backspace.org/iod/iod4Winupdates.html)	SFMOMA Presents Bill Viola (Archived 21 June 2000 via Wayback)	PHON:E:ME (Archived 10 May 2000 via Wayback)
Broadband	VIDEO FARM (Archived 11 May 2000 via Wayback)	Atom Films (Archived 11 May 2000 via Wayback)	Congo Trek (Archived 11 May 2000 via Wayback)
Broadband	VIDEO FARM (Archived 11 May 2000 via Wayback)	Atom Films (Archived 11 May 2000 via Wayback)	IFILM (Archived 19 May 2000 via Wayback)
Broadband	VIDEO FARM (Archived 11 May 2000 via Wayback)	Atom Films (Archived 11 May 2000 via Wayback)	WireBreak (Archived 11 May 2000 via Wayback)
Commerce	BabyCenter (Archived 11 May 2000 via Wayback)	Amazon (Archived 11 May 2000 via Wayback)	eToys (Archived 11 May 2000 via Wayback)
Commerce	BabyCenter (Archived 11 May 2000 via Wayback)	Amazon (Archived 11 May 2000 via Wayback)	Gear.com (Archived 11 May 2000 via Wayback)
Commerce	BabyCenter (Archived 11 May 2000 via Wayback)	Amazon (Archived 11 May 2000 via Wayback)	MobShop (Archived 11 May 2000 via Wayback)
Comedy	The Onion (http://www.theonion.com)		
Community	Cafe Utne (Archived 11 May 2000 via Wayback)	Slashdot (Archived 11 May 2000 via Wayback)	ConsumerREVIEW.com's MtbREVIEW (Archived 11 May 2000 via Wayback)
Community	Cafe Utne (Archived 11 May 2000 via Wayback)	Slashdot (Archived 11 May 2000 via Wayback)	Craigslist (Archived 11 May 2000 via Wayback)
Community	Cafe Utne (Archived 11 May 2000 via Wayback)	Slashdot (Archived 11 May 2000 via Wayback)	ICQ (Archived 11 May 2000 via Wayback)
Education	Merriam-Webster Word Central (Archived 10 May 2000 via Wayback)		A Science Odyssey (Archived 11 May 2000 via Wayback)
Education	Merriam-Webster Word Central (Archived 10 May 2000 via Wayback)		Culture Shock (Archived 10 May 2000 via Wayback)
Education	Merriam-Webster Word Central (Archived 10 May 2000 via Wayback)		DNA from the Beginning (Archived 11 May 2000 via Wayback)
Education	Merriam-Webster Word Central (Archived 10 May 2000 via Wayback)		Getty ArtsEdNet (Archived 11 May 2000 via Wayback)
Fashion, Style & Beauty	Paul Smith (Archived 11 May 2000 via Wayback)	toddoldham.com (Archived 11 May 2000 via Wayback)	FashionUK, Hint Fashion Magazine, Solemates: The Century in Shoes
Financial Services & Banking	Gomez.com (http://www.gomez.com)		
Games	GameSpy Industries (Archived 11 May 2000 via Wayback)	Shockwave.com (Archived 11 May 2000 via Wayback)	Gamasutra (Archived 11 May 2000 via Wayback)
Games	GameSpy Industries (Archived 11 May 2000 via Wayback)	Shockwave.com (Archived 11 May 2000 via Wayback)	Happy Puppy (Archived 11 May 2000 via Wayback)
Games	GameSpy Industries (Archived 11 May 2000 via Wayback)	Shockwave.com (Archived 11 May 2000 via Wayback)	The Station (Archived 11 May 2000 via Wayback)
Health & Wellness	Thrive Online (http://www.thriveonline.com)		
Living	Epicurious (http://www.epicurious.com)		
Movie & Film	Atom Films (Archived 15 August 2000 via Wayback)	Internet Movie Database (Archived 18 October 2000 via Wayback)	Drew's Scripts-O-Rama (Archived 15 August 2000 via Wayback)
Movie & Film	Atom Films (Archived 15 August 2000 via Wayback)	Internet Movie Database (Archived 18 October 2000 via Wayback)	IFILM (Archived 15 August 2000 via Wayback)
Movie & Film	Atom Films (Archived 15 August 2000 via Wayback)	Internet Movie Database (Archived 18 October 2000 via Wayback)	ProteinTV
Music	Napster (http://www.napster.com)		
News	Jim Romenesko's Media News (http://www.poynter.org/medianews)		
Personal Blog/Website	Cocky Bastard (http://www.cockybastard.com)		
Politics	Politics.com (http://www.politics.com)		
Print & Zines	Nerve (http://www.nerve.com)		
Radio	Lost and Found Sound (http://www.lostandfoundsound.com)		
Science	The Cave of Lascaux (http://www.culture.fr/culture/arcnat/lascaux/en)		
Services & Utilities	Evite (http://www.evite.com)		
Sports	ESPN (http://www.espn.com)		
Technical Achievement	Google (http://www.google.com)		
Television, Film & Streaming	MSNBC (http://www.msnbc.com)		
Travel & Lifestyle	Outside Online (http://www.outsideonline.com)		
Weird	Stile Project (http://www.stileproject.com)		
Youth	Scholastic.com (http://www.scholastic.com)		
