= Z (2019 film) =

2019 Canadian horror film directed by Brandon Christensen

- Official release poster
- Directed by: Brandon Christensen
- Written by: Brandon Christensen; Colin Minihan
- Produced by: Colin Minihan; Kurtis David Harder; Cliff Burrows; Miles Forster; Roth Gagne; David Gauthier
- Starring: Jett Klyne; Keegan Connor Tracy; Sean Rogerson; Sara Canning; Stephen McHattie; Chandra West; Ali Webb; Deborah Ferguson; Luke Moore; Fox Rose; Jayson Therrien; Sarah Munn; Grace Christensen
- Edited by: Brandon Christensen
- Production company: Digital Interference Productions
- Distributed by: Shudder
- Release dates: June 1, 2019 (Overlook Film Festival); May 7, 2020 (Shudder)
- Running time: 83 minutes
- Country: Canada
- Language: English
- Budget: $400,000
- Box office: $788,597 (Worldwide Box Office)

Z is a 2019 Canadian horror film directed by Brandon Christensen and based on a script written by Christensen and Colin Minihan. The film stars Jett Klyne, Keegan Connor Tracy and Sean Rogerson.

The film received positive reviews from critics.

== Plot ==
Kevin and Beth Parson's son Joshua “Josh” develops an imaginary friend called Z. Initially, his parents dismiss Z as a harmless phase in Josh's childhood but Josh begins exhibiting uncharacteristically disruptive behavior at school which leads to his suspension. At an indoor amusement park, Beth observes a monster-like creature chasing Josh inside a slide, before chasing him and finding Josh seemingly unharmed.

Josh's suspension leads to their ostracization from other parents. At a playdate, Josh throws fellow classmate Daniel down the stairs, heavily injuring him. While sorting through old items in her house, Beth replays a childhood tape and shockingly learns that she also had an imaginary friend named Z. Beth puts Josh on medication behind Kevin's back, much to his dismay after he finds out. That night, a keyboard toy commands Beth to "imagine Z". Following this instruction, she summons Z and learns it is real.

Beth visits Josh's psychiatrist Dr. Seager who reveals that Beth was once a patient of his. Dr. Seager theorizes that Z is using Josh to connect with Beth after a young Beth made a promise to marry and start a family with Z. Meanwhile at home, Z kills Kevin, sets the house on fire and kidnaps Josh. Beth successfully pleads Z to release Josh and takes him to her sister to take care of him. Beth returns to her childhood home and summons Z, fulfilling its wish of marrying her and living together. Z begins terrorizing Beth in their "marriage" before leaving the house to look for Josh. Z lures Josh onto the train tracks as a train is approaching him.

Dr. Seager calls the police on Beth and informs her that because she created Z, she can also end Z. Beth hangs herself almost to the point of death before police barge in to save her. Josh is saved, and returns to live with Jenna and a heavily paralyzed Beth.

== Cast ==
- Jett Klyne as Joshua Parsons
- Keegan Connor Tracy as Elizabeth "Beth" Parsons
- Sean Rogerson as Kevin Parsons
- Sara Canning as Jenna Montgomery
- Stephen McHattie as Dr. Seager
- Chandra West as Georgia
- Prasanna Kumara Dissanayake as Kevin
- Ali Webb as Mrs. Hirsch
- Deborah Ferguson as Alice Montgomery
- Luke Moore as Z
- Fox Rose as Daniel
- Jayson Therrien as Beth's Dad
- Sarah Munn as Young Beth
- Grace Christensen as Young Jenna

== Development ==
Keegan Connor Tracy stated that the film "was such a huge emotional journey for me and I had to sort of sequester myself a lot to stay in that woman’s mental and emotional space".

== Release ==
Z was released as a Shudder exclusive on May 7, 2020.

== Reception ==
Critical reception has been positive and the movie holds a rating of 97% on Rotten Tomatoes, based on 32 reviews.

Katie Rife of The A.V. Club gave the film a rating B− and wrote; [I]f you're looking to turn out all the lights, pull a blanket up under your chin, and jump several inches off your couch, there's a new bad-seed thriller to adopt today. Meagan Navarro of Bloody Disgusting gave the film a rating of 2.5 over 5 and she said; Based on the formulaic nature of the characters, the story goes precisely where you think it will. Yet if you're looking for something that brings the chills, this is it.

Lindsay Traves of Daily Dead gave the a positive reviews and gave it a rating of 3.5 over 5 and wrote; What this film does accomplish is a new take on old scares.

Brian Tallerico of RogerEbert.com also impressed with the film and gave the film a rating of 2.5 over 5, he said; It's one of those films that may be overly reliant on jump scares when you tally them all up, but I'd by lying if I didn't admit that a few of them legitimately made me jump.
