= Computer Games Magazine =

Monthly computer gaming magazine 1988–2007

- A sample issue of Computer Games Magazine
- Categories: Computer and video game console magazine
- Frequency: Monthly
- Publisher: theGlobe.com
- First issue: October 1988 (as Games International); October 1990 (as Strategy Plus)
- Final issue: April 2007 (Issue 197)
- Country: United States
- Based in: Fort Lauderdale, Florida
- Website: cgonline.com
- ISSN: 0955-4424

Computer Games Magazine was a monthly computer and console gaming print magazine, founded in October 1988 as the United Kingdom publication Games International. During its history, it was known variously as Strategy Plus (October 1990, Issue 1) and Computer Games Strategy Plus, but changed its name to Computer Games Magazine after its purchase by theGlobe.com. When it closed down in April 2007, it held the record for the second-longest-running print magazine dedicated exclusively to computer games with 197 issues, behind only Computer Gaming World. In 1998 and 2000, it was the United States' third-largest magazine in this field.

== History ==
The magazine's original editor-in-chief, Brian Walker, sold Strategy Plus to the United States retail chain Chips & Bits in 1991. Based in Vermont and owned by Tina and Yale Brozen, Chips & Bits retitled Strategy Plus to Computer Games Strategy Plus after the purchase. Its circulation rose to around 130,000 monthly copies by the mid-1990s. By 1998, Computer Games Strategy Plus was the United States' third-largest computer game magazine, with a circulation of 184,299. According to editor-in-chief Steve Bauman, this number rose to 220,000 in 1999. Chips & Bits was purchased by theGlobe.com in January 2000, alongside Computer Games Strategy Plus and its publishing division, Strategy Plus, Inc.

By March 2000, Computer Games' circulation had reached 240,000 copies; roughly 300,000 units of each issue were printed per month. It remained the United States' third-biggest computer game magazine by that date, according to Yale Brozen, and the publication's Ed Mitchell estimated that it was Vermont's largest magazine in any field. Its official website, cdmag.com, averaged one million unique visits per month by early 2000. The magazine experienced major growth during 2000: tracking firm BPA International recorded its average circulation from July–December as 374,576 copies, while the December issue rose to 450,515. Computer Games Magazine was subsequently redesigned, starting from its June 2001 issue.

Computer Games Magazine launched a sister publication, MMO Games Magazine, in 2006. On March 13, 2007, both publications were shut down by theGlobe.com, after that company was hit with a multimillion-dollar judgement in a lawsuit resulting from the e-mail spam of MySpace.

== MMO Games Magazine ==
MMO Games Magazine (formerly Massive Magazine) was a short-lived computer magazine that focused on the massively multiplayer online gaming market. It was published by the media conglomerate theGlobe.com as a sister publication to Computer Games magazine. The magazine's website was launched in June 2006, and the first issue hit newsstands that September. In January 2007 the magazine began to be published quarterly. Despite the build-up, only three issues went to press. In March 2007, theGlobe.com was forced to cease operation of its print media, including MMO Games, as a result of an unfavorable ruling in a spam lawsuit.
