= Words and Pictures (film) =

2013 film

- Theatrical film poster
- Directed by: Fred Schepisi
- Written by: Gerald Di Pego
- Produced by: Curtis Burch; Gerald Di Pego
- Starring: Clive Owen; Juliette Binoche; Bruce Davison; Navid Negahban; Amy Brenneman
- Cinematography: Ian Baker
- Edited by: Peter Honess
- Music by: Paul Grabowsky
- Distributed by: Roadside Attractions
- Release dates: September 7, 2013 (TIFF); May 23, 2014 (US)
- Running time: 111 minutes
- Country: United States
- Language: English
- Box office: $3.3 million

Words and Pictures is a 2013 American drama film directed by Fred Schepisi and starring Clive Owen, Juliette Binoche, and Keegan Connor Tracy. It was screened in the Gala Presentation section at the 2013 Toronto International Film Festival.

== Plot ==
Croyden is an upscale college preparatory school in Maine that hires teachers for their advanced courses who are accomplished professionals.

Jack Marcus is a writer and poet who teaches the advanced writing class. He is a good teacher who inspires his students. He demonstrates how some carefully chosen words and phrases can stimulate the listener's imagination to produce vivid mental imagery. One particular grievance of his involves the way in which young developing minds have been hijacked by the tedious distractions of modern technical gadgetry. He seems to be afflicted with writer's block and hasn't come out with any original work in several years. He publishes the school's literary magazine, which the school administration is planning to shut down for budgetary reasons. He is a high-functioning alcoholic who chronically arrives late to work and is on the verge of being fired. He is divorced and has an adult son from his first marriage, but they have become estranged because of Jack's drinking and general irresponsibility.

Dina Delsanto is an artist who has just been hired to teach the advanced art class, which has the same students as Jack's writing class. Dina was a successful painter in New York City, but she now has difficulty painting or even walking and engaging in daily activities because of severe rheumatoid arthritis. She can no longer fasten buttons, open medicine bottles or hold paint brushes. She moved to Maine, where her sister and her mother live, so that they can help her during the spells when her arthritis worsens. As a teacher, she is a perfectionist with no interest in her students' personal lives. She simply wants them to concentrate on creating the best works of art that they can. She shows them the difference between paintings that merely demonstrate craft and paintings that evoke feeling as well. She struggles to paint again by overcoming her physical limitations as well as her own artistic difficulties. She finally creates a good work of art and sets it aside to dry. She has, incidentally, professed a complete disdain for the spoken and printed word. She insists that artistically rendered images are the only worthwhile media for expressing "truth".

Jack's colleagues and friends perceive him as attention-getting, obnoxious and charming. Once he gets wind of Dina's personal philosophy, he provokes an argument with her over which is more important, words or pictures. Their students are drawn into the conflict with class assignments demonstrating the superiority of words over pictures or pictures over words. Dina agrees to have her students contribute their own works of art to Jack's literary magazine. They decide to have an assembly in which each side will put on a presentation arguing the case for words and for pictures. The school administration becomes impressed enough with all of this activity to retain his services as an instructor.

Jack pursues Dina romantically and ultimately succeeds. But, during his first night over, he gets drunk on her vodka and crashes headlong into her newest painting. He further confesses to plagiarizing a poem from his own son, a moral failing for which Dina is even more unforgiving. She throws him out and tells him she doesn't want to have anything more to do with him.

He confesses the plagiarism to the school board and hands in his resignation. He asks only to continue for the rest of the year and put on the War on Words and Pictures assembly program. The board grants him his request, and the movie concludes with a satisfying resolution at the aforementioned assembly.

== Cast ==
- Clive Owen as Jack Marcus
- Juliette Binoche as Dina Delsanto
- Keegan Connor Tracy as Ellen
- Bruce Davison as Walt
- Amy Brenneman as Elspeth
- Adam DiMarco as Swint
- Valerie Tian as Emily
- Navid Negahban as Rashid
- Janet Kidder as Sabine
- David Lewis as Tom

== Reception ==
=== Box office ===
Words and Pictures grossed $2,171,257 in the United States and $1,175,000 in other territories, for a worldwide gross of $3,346,257.

=== Critical response ===
On Rotten Tomatoes, the film has an approval rating of 43% based on 95 reviews, with an average rating of 5.5/10. The site's critical consensus reads: "While both talented performers in their own right, Juliette Binoche and Clive Owen are decidedly mismatched in Words and Pictures, and they aren't done many favors by the movie's awkwardly constructed screenplay." On Metacritic, the film has a score of 49 out of 100, based on 26 critics, indicating "mixed or average reviews".

Odie Henderson of RogerEbert.com gave the film only one and a half stars and wrote: "Unfortunately, Words and Pictures fails at portraying both titular nouns. The screenplay by Gerald Di Pego (Phenomenon) is full of subpar dialogue, one-dimensional characters, scenes that belong in a different movie, other scenes that belong in the trash, multiple rom-com sins of cliché and a warped, stalkerish notion of what constitutes romance. When the hero's idea of a term of endearment to the heroine is 'you cold-hearted ice bitch', one wonders what he'd say if he were pissed at her." Deborah Young of The Hollywood Reporter wrote: "Schepisi, whose last film was his adaptation The Eye of the Storm, based on an Australian classic, is a general who marshals actors to bring emotional depth to almost any kind of screenplay. Here the human elements take the foreground, and romance comes trailing along forlornly behind. Not that the chemistry isn't there between Owen and Binoche, who has rarely looked so beautiful onscreen, even playing a woman with physical handicaps. But the strange reticence of the scene when the two finally hit the hay feels like a throwback to the 1930s, including a huge cutaway that ends with the protags in bed with the sheets pulled up to their necks, saying how great it all was."

Claudia Puig of USA Today gave Words and Pictures three and half stars and stated: "A thoughtful film about ideas—creativity, the power of language and the eloquence of visuals—it features two impeccable performances full of vitality. Clive Owen plays Jack Marcus, a voluble prep school English teacher who laments the reductive nature of social media. Juliette Binoche is Dina Delsanto, an Italian-born expressionist painter and art instructor at the same elite New England school. Both are disillusioned with life and education, and neither suffers fools. They are tart-tongued and cantankerous, but engaging."
