= Matthew Carnahan =

American filmmaker

- Born: February 6, 1961 (age 65)
- Occupations: Director; writer; producer
- Years active: 2004–present
- Known for: House of Lies
- Spouse: Honor Molloy (m. 1983–1984) Rachel Strong (m. 2023)
- Partner: Helen Hunt (2001–2017)
- Children: 2

Matthew McNair Carnahan (born February 6, 1961) is an American producer, writer, and director.

== Career ==
Valley of the Boom, about the 1990s Silicon Valley technology boom and bust, is a six-part American docudrama television miniseries, created, directed, and executive produced by Carnahan. It premiered on January 13, 2019, on National Geographic.

== Personal life ==
Carnahan studied at New York University, as well as the Neighborhood Playhouse School of the Theatre.

He has a son from a previous relationship and a daughter with actress and longtime partner Helen Hunt. In August 2017, the couple split after 16 years together.

== Filmography ==
=== Television ===
Year	Title	Writer	Director	Producer	Network	Notes
1998	Trinity	Yes (2)	No	Supervise	NBC	
2000	The Fugitive	Yes (2)	No	Consultive	CBS	
2001	Thieves	Yes (2)	No	Co-executive	ABC	
2002–03	Fastlane	Yes (3)	No	Consultive	Fox	
2007–08	Dirt	Yes (5)	Yes (3)	Executive	FX	
2012–16	House of Lies	Yes (22)	Yes (6)	Executive	Showtime	
2019	Valley of the Boom	Yes (3)	No	Executive	National Geographic	

=== Film ===
Year	Title	Notes
1996	Mailman	Writer (short film)
1997	Black Circle Boys	Writer
1997	Rudyland	Producer
2014	Ride	Producer

== Bibliography ==
- Serpent Girl (2005) (ISBN 1-4000-6270-5)
