= TheGlobe.com =

Early internet startup

theGlobe.com
- Type: Public (OTCID Basic Current: TGLO)
- Industry: Social networking, media
- Founded: 1995
- Founders: Stephan Paternot, Todd Krizelman
- Defunct: 2008
- Headquarters: New York, Fort Lauderdale
- Key people: Michael Egan; Ed Cespedes
- Products: Chat, message boards, Computer Games Magazine, GloPhone
- Number of employees: 120 at peak
- Website: http://www.theglobe.com (archive)

theGlobe.com was an internet startup founded in 1995 by Cornell students Stephan Paternot and Todd Krizelman. A social networking service, theGlobe.com made headlines by going public on November 13, 1998 and posting the largest first day gain of any IPO in history up to that date. Part of the dot-com bubble, the company's stock price collapsed the next year, and the company retrenched for several years before ceasing operations in 2008.

== History ==
=== Early success ===
theglobe.com screenshot (12-15-2000)

While undergraduates at Cornell, Paternot and Krizelman encountered a primitive chatroom on the university's computer network and quickly became engrossed. Realizing the business potential, the two raised $15,000 over the 1994 Christmas break and purchased an Apple Internet Server. They founded a programming company, WebGenesis, and spent the next few months programming what would become their primary website. theGlobe.com went live April 1, 1995, and attracted over 44,000 visits within the first month. They readily recruited talent from the Cornell computer science department and had 17 employees by the site's first anniversary.

The pair used the popularity of the site and the increasing interest in the internet in 1997 to secure $20 million in financing through Dancing Bear Investments. As a result, Paternot and Krizelman received salaries in excess of $100,000 and revenues from preferred shares sales of $500,000 each. Both were 23 years old at the time.

In 1998, plans were made to take the company public, with "TGLO" as its ticker symbol and its shares listed on NASDAQ. On November 13, 1998, theGlobe.com issued its IPO. The stock's target share price was initially set at $9, yet the first trade was at $87 and the price climbed as high as $97 before closing at $63.50. At the end of the trading day, the company had set a record for IPOs with a 606% increase over the initial share price. The company floated 3.1 million shares, raising $27.9 million and bringing its market capitalization to over $840 million. Based on their holdings, the young founders were worth close to $100 million each.

During the late 1990s, theGlobe.com expanded into gaming, purchasing Computer Games magazine, happypuppy.com (a computer gaming site), and Chips and Bits, an online store for computer and console gaming.

=== Decline and downfall ===
As the fortunes of a number of very young people grew almost overnight, the public and the media began to scrutinize these new economy wunderkinds. In 1999, CNN filmed Paternot during a night on the town. He was shown in shiny vinyl pants, dancing on a table at a trendy Manhattan night club with his girlfriend, model Jennifer Medley. During the piece, he made the statement, "Got the girl. Got the money. Now I'm ready to live a disgusting, frivolous life." He was derisively dubbed "the CEO in the plastic pants" and became a visible symbol of the excesses of dot-com millionaires.

That year also marked the change in the momentum of the dot com boom and theGlobe.com's stock price was hit heavily. As investors grew increasingly skeptical of the "new economy", share prices began to decline rapidly. theGlobe.com saw its share price drop from a high of $97 to less than 10 cents and its market capitalization shrink by more than 95% to around $4 million in 2001.

In 2000, Paternot and Krizelman were forced out of the company and it was taken over by a former VP of the AICPA, but the company, which had never turned a profit, was forced to cut back severely. theGlobe.com closed its flagship site and laid off 50% of its employees in August 2001. The company continued hosting some of its partner sites and publishing Computer Games, but the domain of www.theglobe.com displayed nothing more than an informational message about the site's termination until 2003.

That year, theGlobe.com launched GloPhone, a VoIP phone service similar to Skype, and used its eponymous domain as the product's website. Although teamed with networking site Friendster, reviews were bad and sales were poor. A lawsuit was filed by Sprint Nextel for patent infringement. theGlobe.com had continued publishing Computer Games and it was considered one of the top 3 PC gaming magazines in the US (along with Ziff Davis' Games for Windows and Future Publishing's PC Gamer). The company expanded its print enterprises to include Now Playing magazine (2005) and MMO Games magazine (2006), publications focusing on popular entertainment and massively multiplayer gaming, respectively. theGlobe.com made a decision to send unsolicited messages to MySpace.com users and was subsequently sued under the CAN-SPAM act and a similar anti-spam law in California. A California court ruled against theGlobe.com. Subsequently, the magazines stopped publication, Chips & Bits' home page announced the site's closing, and GloPhone ceased operations on March 13, 2007. The anticipation of a large federal judgement (estimated as high as $120 million) effectively spelled the end of theGlobe.com.

=== Lawsuits ===
The company was subject to six putative shareholder class action lawsuits. It was sued by vendors to the discontinued VoIP business. And in October 2011, it was sued in connection with the 2005 sale of a subsidiary called SendTec to RelationServ Media, which company subsequently failed.

=== Tralliance ===
On May 9, 2005, the company acquired Tralliance Corporation, a company which maintains the .travel top-level domain. By mid-2007, the domain theglobe.com redirected to the home page of Tralliance. The company then sold Tralliance on September 29, 2008. theglobe received earn-out rights from Tralliance Registry Management, which will constitute the only source of future revenue for theglobe.

With the sale of Tralliance, theglobe.com became a shell company with no operations or assets other than its rights in the Tralliance earn-out. The company operates out of borrowed offices, and as of March 1, 2012, it reported having no employees other than its executive officers, each of whom devoted "very limited time" to TheGlobe's business, and received no compensation for doing so.

=== As a shell ===
The company's stock continues to trade on the OTC Bulletin Board under the symbol TGLO. As of the company's 2011 annual report, it reported $6426 in assets versus $3.2 million in liabilities. Management has stated that the Tralliance earn-out must perform very well, or they will need to raise additional capital, or the company will file for bankruptcy.

On December 31, 2017, Delfin Midstream LLC, an LNG exporter, purchased almost 71 percent of the outstanding shares of TheGlobe.com as a vehicle for possibly going public through a reverse merger. In November 2022, TheGlobe.com reported that it expects to continue operating as a public company for the next twelve months with funding from Delfin. Frederick Jones (a founder of Glencore) from 2018 continues to serve as CEO and CFO.

== Published magazines ==
- Computer Games Magazine
- MMO Games Magazine
- Now Playing
