= DrinkExchange =

DrinkExchange was a monthly social and business networking party started in San Francisco, California during the dot com bubble.

The event was started in February, 1997 by Ali Partovi, co-founder of the Internet firm LinkExchange, and his roommate-coworkers Alan Shusterman and Mike Bayle, who were initially looking to find ways to improve their social life. The format was humorously based on LinkExchange's early ad exchange model (though not formally affiliated with the company), by which web publishers could trade two outgoing "clicks" on banner ads placed on their site for one visitor backlink from other publishers. At the events, participants were encouraged to buy two alcoholic drinks, and give one to a fellow guest.

Invitations to the initial event, held at the local Gordon Biersch brewery, were in the form of a mock product announcement press release from LinkExchange, which ended up becoming a local viral email phenomenon and attracting seventy guests. Later events drew more than one thousand participants each, included corporate sponsorships, and eventually spread to Tokyo, Sydney, London, Hong Kong, San Diego, and Washington, DC. The parties continued until the "dot com crash" of 2001.
