= Distributed management =

Management method

Distributed management is a management method for people to work together over the web to accomplish desired goals. Management activities are distributed through the people doing the work.

== Changed Operating Environment ==
Traditionally the functions of management are centralised and performed by managers. This limits the amount of work that can be done.

The Internet has provided the opportunity for people to work together globally. However, “manager centric” approaches have been unable to provide a practical means to fully utilize the available connectivity.

Social networking has been tried, but it lacks an underlying management method and the tools to apply the method globally and consistently.

== History ==
In his Doctorate on Introducing Technology into Organizations completed in 1990, Dr. Neil Miller identified the need for a distributed management paradigm. In 1991, he founded TASKey Pty Ltd to develop, operationalise, and commercialize a new distributed management paradigm. Patents on the core parts of distributed management were granted in Australia (1997) and USA (2000).

In 1995, TASKey correctly estimated that the web technologies required to globally implement distributed management would not be available for about 15 years. TASKey has used this time for comprehensive experimentation and to refine TASKey methods and software tools, so they are acceptable and workable for most people with minimal training.

== Key Parts ==
The key parts of Distributed Management are:

- Each task has stakeholders (called a task team) with one person responsible
- Related tasks are joined through a task tree
- Context, task visibility, security and privacy are based on task team membership
- Team members list the actions/To-Dos required to do a task
- Team members create action teams to do each action
- Web software creates a To-Do list for each person based on action team membership
- Task progress reporting is based on completed actions

== Differentiators ==
The differentiators between distributed management and traditional management are:

- Designed for the web (not just automating existing manual methods)
- Anyone, anywhere, at any time, can initiate a task
- Handles all tasks concurrently (strategies, operations, governance, projects, personal)
- Automatically keeps tasks and people coordinated globally through teams
- Sorts out global task information and presents it from each user's perspective
- Creates and synchronizes peoples’ To Do lists and Gantt charts
- Controls access to information using patented dynamic security and privacy methods
- Informs users on a need-to-know basis (so people are not overwhelmed)
- Includes specialist software tools for templating, and adjusting complex task, team and To-Do relationships (to match real world situations)

== Software Tools ==
Implementing the distributed management paradigm required new web software to manage the complex dynamic relationships that need to be managed to get work done. Over 13 years, TASKey has developed, validated and commercialized web software called TASKey TEAM for enterprise distributed management and Me2Team (a basic version of TASKey TEAM).

TASKey web software is unique in that it automatically tracks and organizes all tasks (for strategies, operations and projects), synchronizes all stakeholders’ personal To Do lists, and automatically reports progress.

== Validation ==
TASKey software functionality has been developed and validated in a range of workplaces over 13 years. Case studies^{Ref} demonstrate effective use by both managers and workers.

== Management Insights ==
Management insights that have been gained during the development, validation and commercialization of Distributed Management are explored in Blog – Articles and Insights
