= Pixelon =

Scandal-ridden dot-com company

- Type: Private
- Industry: Online video delivery service
- Founded: 1998; 28 years ago in San Juan Capistrano, California
- Founder: "Michael Fenne", an alias used by fugitive David Kim Stanley
- Defunct: June 2000; 26 years ago
- Fate: Liquidation
- Headquarters: San Juan Capistrano, California, US
- Products: vaporware
- Website: Archive of Pixelon website just before bankruptcy

Pixelon was an American dot-com company founded in 1998 that promised better distribution of high-quality video over the Internet. It was based in San Juan Capistrano, California. It gained fame for its extravagant Las Vegas launch party, followed by its sudden and violent decline less than a year later as it became evident it was using technologies that were, in fact, fake or misrepresented. Its founder, "Michael Fenne", was actually David Kim Stanley, a convicted felon involved in stock scams who was "on the lam and living out of the back of his car" when he arrived in California two years earlier. In the year 2000, Pixelon began to fire employees and reduce its operations until its bankruptcy. Pixelon ousted their management team and filed for bankruptcy in June 2000.

== iBash '99 ==
The party event for Pixelon's product launch, called "iBASH '99", was held October 29, 1999, at the MGM Grand Las Vegas, at a reported cost of US$16 million. The lineup featured performances by Chely Wright, LeAnn Rimes, Faith Hill, Dixie Chicks, Sugar Ray, Natalie Cole, Kiss, Tony Bennett, the Brian Setzer Orchestra, and a reunion of the Who.

Pixelon announced that iBash would be broadcast over the Internet as a technology demonstration. The live stream displayed error messages to thousands of people, and most of those watching the concert did so with Microsoft's streaming software instead of Pixelon's. Pixelon leased the large video screen on One Times Square in New York City to show an eight-hour-plus live feed of the event. An edited 2-hour show aired on October 30, 1999, on Pax TV (now known as Ion Television).

iBash was produced by Woody Fraser Productions and was hosted live by David Spade and Cindy Margolis. The Who later released their set as a DVD titled The Vegas Job, featuring two short pre-show interviews with Roger Daltrey and John Entwistle, and a short after-crash interview with David Kim Stanley admitting to embezzlement.

== Aftermath ==
The history of the company was covered in the 2019 National Geographic's docudrama miniseries Valley of the Boom.
