= Rosanne Siino =

American businesswomen (born 1963)

- Born: March 29, 1962 (age 64)
- Education: University of the Pacific (B.A.); Stanford University (Ph.D.)

Rosanne Siino is the retired former Vice President of Communications for Netscape (Communications Corporation). Siino is responsible for crafting the 1990s message that "the web is for everyone", as well as making the pivotal decision to turn Marc Andreessen in to a "rock star," and creating the publicity strategy which landed Andreessen, barefoot, on the cover of Time Magazine. She spent 16 years in corporate communications, 13 of which were in high-tech public relations. Siino retired from Netscape after the 1998 acquisition by AOL and returned to graduate school. Since retiring, she has consulted for numerous high-tech and Internet companies, such as AOL, Google, Shutterfly, Qualcomm, and PlanetOut. Siino is also known for her philanthropy and interest in developing nations. As of 2009, Siino teaches and conducts research for the Management Science and Engineering Department at Stanford University. Her research focus is in the socio-emotional effects of digital technologies on how people work and interact." Her past research topics specifically include work-role enactment over geographic distance, and interaction rituals on distributed management teams.

== Early life ==
Rosanne Siino was born on March 29, 1962. The daughter of an Italian immigrant and first generation Italian-American, she was raised in the East Bay (San Francisco Bay Area), California, United States. After graduating from a Catholic high school, she earned a degree in Communications, with minors in Sociology and English, from University of the Pacific and began her career in journalism and television.

== Career ==
In the early 1990s, Siino began advising Jim Clark at SGI. She was a key founding team member for Netscape, creating the Netscape brand and lifting the company into high public visibility. She is responsible for creating and initiating the education campaign that promoted Internet access for the public and made the now-ubiquitous web browser a household word.

Siino created the communications team that led Netscape in the 1990s browser wars.

== Post-Netscape ==
Following Netscape, Siino pursued a PhD in Management Science and Engineering in the Organizations, Technology, and Entrepreneurship research area at Stanford University. She obtained her PhD in 2008. Her doctoral research studied managers at work via video conferencing. Her past research topics specifically include work-role enactment over geographic distance, and interaction rituals on distributed management teams.

Siino remains deeply committed to philanthropy and serves on multiple corporate and non profit boards. Since 2006, she has been teaching courses in organizational behavior at Stanford University.

== See also ==
- Netscape
- Category:Netscape
- Internet access
- Web browser
- Browser wars
- Code Rush
