= Sfgirl.com =

sfGirl.com
- Website type: Lifestyle blog
- Available in: English
- Owner: Patty Beron
- Creator: Patty Beron
- Editor: Patty Beron
- Website: sfgirl.com
- Users: 1000+
- Launched: April 12, 1999; 27 years ago
- Current status: archived
- Written in: HTML 4.01

sfGirl.com was an online community founded by Patty Beron (sfGirl), a social media pioneer. While sometimes referred to as a "legendary party crasher" and "queen of San Francisco's dot-com party scene," Beron was a web developer and programmer with a vision to create one of the first noted online communities in the Bay Area. The website was active as an online community from April 1999 until October 2002.

== History ==
Beron founded the site in early 1999 to document, popularize, and promote social and business networking parties that had become part of the business culture of San Francisco's "dot com" industry, as well as her persona as a glamorous gatecrasher. Following the "dot com crash" of 2001, during which much of the industry collapsed, Beron began promoting "pink slip parties" highly successful recruiting events and the "Schwag Exchange" at which people would give away promotional items they had collected. The site is no longer active as an event page but you can visit the page to learn about the dot com party history.

In 2000, the San Francisco Bay Guardian called sfGirl.com the best place to "find the parties where you can get all liquored up for free and talk to 23-year-old millionaires."

In early 2019, the National Geographic Channel docudrama Valley of the Boom profiled both Beron and sfGirl.com with both interviews and dramatizations in episodes 3 and 6 of this miniseries concerning the party scene during the dot com boom and bust at the end of the millennium.

Today Patty Beron posts content related to sfgirl.com and related history on Instagram as "@therealsfgirl".
