= Stephan Paternot =

IT entrepreneur

- Born: March 21, 1974 (age 51); San Francisco, California, United States
- Occupation: IT entrepreneur
- Known for: Co-founder the first social network, theGlobe.com in 1994

Stephan Paternot is an American IT entrepreneur, known as a co-founder of theGlobe.com, the internet's first social network, during the late nineties dot-com bubble. He went on to become the CEO of Slated, an online crowdsourcing marketplace for film financing, sales, packaging and development.

== Early life and education ==
Paternot was born in San Francisco, raised in Switzerland, then returned to the U.S. for higher education. In 1994, while a junior at Cornell University, he co-founded the first Internet social network site, theglobe.com.

== Career ==
The Globe's IPO made history when it posted the largest first day gain at that time of any IPO with a 606% increase in price.

Early in his tenure, Paternot became known in popular media as "the CEO in the plastic pants" after he was filmed in a nightclub saying "Got the girl. Got the money. Now I'm ready to live a disgusting, frivolous life." theGlobe.com's stock price collapsed in 1999 as a result of the dot-com bubble and in 2001 Paternot published A Very Public Offering: A Rebel's Story of Business Success, Excess, and Reckoning which covered his biography and the history of theGlobe.com

In 2011, Paternot co-founded Slated, a crowdfunding and development website for film projects. In 2022, Bleecker Street, the indie studio behind The Assistant and Mass, entered a strategic multi-picture, multi-year output deal with Slated.
