= Martin Kihn =

American writer and digital marketer

- Born: Zambia
- Citizenship: American
- Education: B.A. (Theater Studies); M.B.A
- Alma mater: Yale University; Columbia Business School
- Occupation: Author
- Website: martykihn.com

Martin Kihn is an American writer and digital marketer.

== Early life and education ==
Martin Kihn was born in Zambia, where his parents met while working in a hospital. His South African-born father is a doctor, and his Scottish mother, a former actress, is now a drama teacher. He grew up in Michigan. He has earned a BA in Theater Studies from Yale and an MBA from Columbia Business School. Kihn subsequently worked as a consultant for Booz Allen Hamilton and a digital marketing analyst for the advertising agency Digitas. In 2013, he became a digital marketing and advertising technology analyst for Gartner.

== Personal life ==
Kihn is married to the musician Julia Douglass, and they reside in Katonah, New York. He is the basis for the character Marty Kaan, played by Don Cheadle in the Showtime series, House of Lies.

== Works ==
After working as a researcher and writer for Forbes and New York, among others, Kihn was head writer for the MTV Networks series, Pop-Up Video, from 1997 to 1999. His memoir, House of Lies, based on his experience as a consultant, was published in 2005. Writing in Salon, Farhad Manjoo said, "Kihn's breezy, Jay McInerney-inspired writing renders [management consulting] precisely, often hilariously." Kihn published two subsequent memoirs: A$$hole (2008) and Bad Dog: A Love Story (2011). Warner Bros. paid $500,000 for the rights to A$$hole, a parody of a business self-help book. Bad Dog: A Love Story relates how Kihn overcame personal problems by training his unruly Bernese Mountain Dog, Hola.

- House of Lies: How Management Consultants Steal Your Watch and Then Tell You the Time, Grand Central, 2005
- Asshole: How I Got Rich and Happy by Not Giving a Shit About You, Broadway Books, 2008
- Bad Dog: A Love Story, Pantheon, 2011
- Customer Data Platforms: Use People Data to Transform the Future of Marketing Engagement, 2020 (with Christopher B. O'Hara)
