= Carstuckgirls.com =

Website of images and videos of women freeing their cars from obstacles

- Website: www.carstuckgirls.com
- Launched: February 2, 2003

Carstuckgirls.com is a website offering online images and videos of women trying to free their cars from a variety of obstacles, and selling tape, DVD and Blu-Ray recordings. Carstuckgirls.com has received several nominations and awards for its online imagery.

The site was founded on February 2, 2003, and included pictures of a girl with her car stuck in the mud. Since then, Carstuckgirls.com has expanded to include thousands of images and several full-length videos, and is now owned by Swen Goebbels Videoproduktion.

In 2004, after just over a year of operation, Carstuckgirls.com was nominated for, and won, both the Webby and the People's Voice award at the Webby Awards ceremony. The awards came in the "Weird" category. To win, Carstuckgirls.com had to beat four other nominees. After its win, the website was mentioned in some small blogs and in Wired magazine. There were both favourable and unfavourable reviews.
