= Tara Hernandez =

Software developer and open source contributor

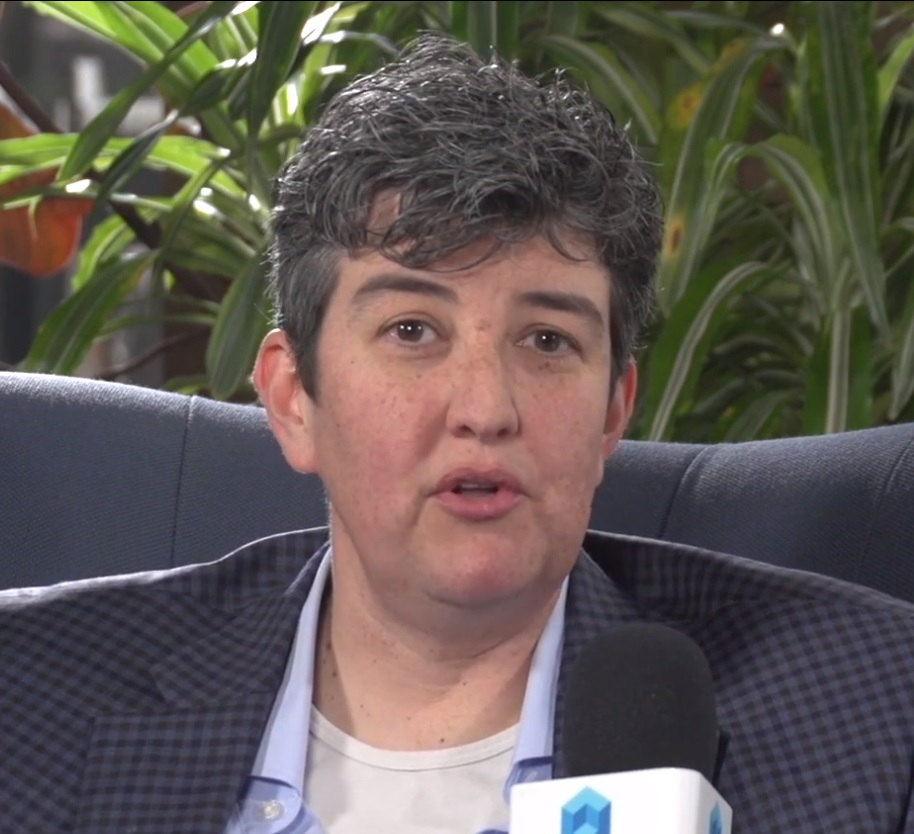
Hernandez on theCUBE in 2016

Tara Hernandez is a professional software developer, and veteran open source contributor, who developed procedures and tools at several Silicon Valley companies. She was an early promoter of what came to be known as the Continuous Integration revolution. As shown in the documentary Code Rush, she was the manager of Netscape Navigator development at Netscape Communications Corporations, and worked on the preparation of the original Mozilla code for public release, which led to the development of the Firefox browser. She has also worked as a Release Team Manager at Blue Martini software, Senior Infrastructure Engineer and Team Lead at Pixar Animation Studios, Senior Engineering Manager at Lithium Technologies, Senior Director of Systems and Build Engineering at Linden Lab, and worked as a Senior Engineering Manager at Google. Tara is currently employed by MongoDB as Vice President of R&D Productivity, where her role is to lead the development of engineering CI/CD systems, builds of various MongoDB software on 40+ platforms, and the performance tooling team.

Tara is a member of the board for Women Who Code and created the “WWCode podcast”, to inspire women to undertake and excel in technology careers.

== Career ==
Hernandez graduated from the University of California, Santa Cruz, in Computer Science in 1993. She began her career as part of the Release Engineering team at Borland, working mainly on development kits for C++ and Delphi.

After moving to Netscape, she was "the first build engineer hired for the Client Engineering team" for Netscape Navigator, and was later promoted to managing the teams working on Netscape across all platforms. During this time she was also involved in the development of projects like bug tracker Bugzilla, CVS repository browser Bonsai, and pioneering continuous integration server Tinderbox. After these projects were taken over by the Mozilla project, she served as a Project Owner for Bugzilla (2000-2002) and Bonsai (1999-2006), and is credited with "keeping Bugzilla development going strong after Terry [Weissman] left mozilla.org".

From 2002 to 2013, Hernandez worked as Senior Infrastructure Engineer and Team Lead at Pixar Animation Studios, where she also worked as Perforce administrator and became Apache admin and MySQL DBA for Studio Tools infrastructure servers.

From 2018 to 2022, Hernandez was an Engineering Leader at Google, overseeing teams building Kubernetes developer tools, API client libraries, and technical learning content for Google Cloud Platform.

She then moved to MongoDB in May of 2022, where she currently works as Vice President of R&D Productivity.

== Conference speaking ==
Hernandez has spoken at technology conferences:

- Taking Flight: Career Progression for Women in Tech (2016)
- Women Transforming Technology (2016)
- AWS re:invent 2017: How Linden Lab Built a Virtual World on the AWS Cloud (GAM311) (2017) video
- Project Sansar Brings VR to Second Life by The New Stack Makers (2018) video
- It’s a people thing: tech’s hardest problem - North America WTM Ambassadors Summit 2019 Austin (2019) video
- GeekWire Cloud Summit 2019
- DevOps World | Jenkins World 2019 - Tuesday Keynote (2019) video
- Emcee Code Jam 2019 World Finals live stream (2019) video
- Keynote Fireside Chat with Nicole Forsgren on the SPACE of Developer Productivity (2020)
