= McClain's Law (film) =

1981 made for TV movie

- Written by: Eric Bercovici (created by)
- Directed by: Vincent McEveety
- Starring: James Arness; Marshall Colt; George DiCenzo; Conchata Ferrell; Carl Franklin; Bibi Besch; Scott Brady; George Loros; John Crawford; Keith Mitchell; Gerald S. O'Loughlin
- Music by: James Di Pasquale
- Country of origin: United States
- Original language: English

Production
- Producers: Robert H. Justman and Mark Rodgers
- Cinematography: Sy Hoffberg A.S.C.
- Running time: 100 minutes
- Production company: Eric Bercovici Productions

Original release
- Network: NBC
- Release: November 20, 1981

McClain's Law is an American made-for-TV police procedural directed by Vincent McEveety and broadcast on November 20, 1981. It is structured as a two-hour pilot episode for James Arness' police detective series McClain's Law which broadcast 14 one-hour episodes Friday nights on NBC between November 27, 1981 and March 20, 1982.

== Plot ==
=== Jim McClain's friend Sid Lammon is murdered ===
In Southern California's San Pedro Bay, on the morning of selling their boat and retiring, fishing boat co-owners Jim McClain and Sid Lammon are taking it for a farewell run around the bay. They meet the buyer and his lawyer Wheeler at the dock and, while receiving separate checks, are observed by three fishing boat owners, Julio Salvi, Rudy Petrovic and Joe Victor who says that his boat is better, but is not for sale and Julio laughs bitterly that, "every fishin' boat in this harbor's for sale". McClain is looking forward to sleeping late, but wakes up as usual at 4 am the next morning, goes to the dock and finds Sid watching their boat heading away to more productive fishing waters in Alaska. They go to the Flatfish Café run by their old friend Vangie Cruise who complains that the neighborhood is going downhill. Sid takes out ten thousand in cash to show her and the money attracts the attention of bar patron Starkey, one of two unsavory members of a work crew assigned to pave the dock.

When McClain returns to his apartment house, police officers are waiting for him to identify Sid's body. During questioning by police detective in charge, Harry Gates, McClain displays his badge, identifying him as a retired member of the San Pedro police department and tells him that Sid was his longtime friend as well as fishing business partner and that he intends to find the killer. Sid had planned to take his family to a new life on an Iowa farm and, when McClain goes to comfort his widow Annie and two teenage sons, there is a "SOLD" sign in front of the house.

Unwrapping his old service revolver, McClain goes to the dock, commiserates with Rudy and then goes to the scene of the crime where Gates and his partner Jerry Cross finish examining the body chalk outline, conclude that the murder will likely go unsolved and drive off, ignoring McClain calling out to them. McClain then visits the dock paving site to question Starkey who tells him to get lost, causing McClain to punch him in the jaw and send him tumbling into a water and cement slurry. McClain then drives to police headquarters where Gates takes him to meet Lt. DeNisco who has been informed about the assault and warns McClain that if there is one more interference, he will find himself standing in front of a judge.

=== McClain promises Sid's widow to find the murderer ===
That evening, McClain is drinking at "The Tides" bar and grill and hears Julio, Rudy and Joe sitting in a booth complaining about crime and hard economic times. The next morning he is at the airport saying goodbye to Annie and the boys as they accompany Sid's body to Iowa. Annie's final words to him are, "You find that man. You find that man who killed Sid." McClain spends the evening at Vangie's place, returns in the morning to the dock and then goes to ask Lt. DeNisco to be reinstated as a police detective. When DeNisco refuses, McClain's next step is to visit his old friend Irv Sutherland at the San Pedro Dispatch who prints the headline "SPPD Rejects Former Hero". Capt. Scofield, McClain's colleague from their time on the force, overrules Lt. DeNisco and welcomes McClain back, calling him "Big Jim McClain", but warns that, "You're fifty-two years old" and makes him take a full training course at the police academy.

=== McClain goes through a tough training course at the police academy ===
McClain passes with high grades despite DeNisco's interference. On the first day, DeNisco assigns Gates to be McClain's partner and, while Gates chases a grocery store robber who takes a shot at him, it is McClain who corners the robber, punches him in the jaw, reads him his rights while pointing a gun to his ear and then cuffs him. Jerry Cross is working on the Lammon murder, but refuses to divulge any details to McClain. After work, Gates and McClain go for a beer to the Flatfish Café where Gates tries to discourage McClain about the prospects for finding Sid's killer, but McClain tells him that he would be just as adamant if it ever came to finding Gates' killer.

=== McClain has a full day, including murder ===
The following morning, McClain arrives at 6:30 for his 8 am shift, sees African-American detective Miller at his desk and assumes her to be a records clerk. She explains that they share the same desk on different shifts. He is assigned a locker, discovers Gates lifting weights in the locker room and then finds a note in his mail slot that the lieutenant made an appointment for him with Dr. Michael Hallett who turns out to be the department's full-time psychologist and tells McClain that he is there for him as a "shrink" if there is ever a need to talk.

A large truck arrives at a warehouse and two masked men inside the truck kill the two guards and take a million dollars' worth of Japanese electronics equipment. McClain, Gates and Cross arrive on the scene, followed by DeNisco who excludes McClain from the case and assigns Cross partnered with detective Shaner. Later that day, officers Webster and Caldwell stop a convertible for running a stop sign and spot, covered by a blanket in back seat, ship-to-shore radios and radar receivers which turn out to be stolen. The man, Eddie Grant, a known receiver of stolen goods, is booked, while the 8 mm gun that was found on him arouses Gates' curiosity.

After his shift, McClain goes to eat at the Flatfish Café and listens to Vangie regret that Sid felt the need to show her the wad of money that likely caused his murder as well as her fears about the rising crime rate and asks, "Where did it all go wrong?" McClain has no answer.

=== McClain moves to a houseboat and makes new friends ===
At his apartment, McClain packs his belongings and moves onto a houseboat the next morning. A pre-teen named Nicky Bannon comes over to the houseboat and introduces himself. His mother, Grace who lives with him in the neighboring houseboat, also comes over and reminds him that the school bus is coming. She invites McClain for coffee, tells him that she does graphic design and strikes up a friendship with him.

At the start of their shift, McClain and Gates go to see Rudy and Julio and, while Gates waits from a distance, McClain engages them in conversation and gets information about the large truck that they saw parked outside the electronics warehouse that was subsequently the scene of the robbery and killing. The third fishing boat owner, Joe Victor, to whom McClain speaks separately about communications equipment stolen from fishing boats and later peddled by Eddie Grant, is evasive and, after McClain leaves, goes into his cabin and starts to smear grease on his new ship-to-shore radio. In the police car, Gates tells McClain that Eddie Grant's gun, a Japanese Nambu 8 mm, was the one used to kill Sid. McClain rushes to interrogate Grant, but is told that he was bailed out at 4am.

=== McClain and Gates have a shootout with the warehouse robbers ===
McClain goes to police property storage, takes one of Grant's confiscated ship-to-shore radios to his houseboat and examines it for clues. When Nicky comes over, McClain explains to him how electronics parts may be useful in tracking wrongdoers. The next morning, Gates arrives and finds McClain enjoying morning coffee on Grace's boat. At headquarters, DeNisco assigns them as backup to Shaner and Cross on the warehouse case. That evening, while Nicky is away at Little League night practice, McClain and Grace make plans to go sailing and, as they share a glass of wine, Nicky returns.

The next morning, McClain and Gates visit electronics repair shops and Gates helps an attractive young woman, Vicki Thomas, start her stalled sportscar. They are then assigned to replace Cross and Shaner at the warehouse where they spot the robbery truck with three men who are listening to police radio and hear DeNisco's instructions to wait for backup. The truck starts driving away and one of the men fires a shotgun at McClain and Gates, shattering their windshield. Gates runs after the truck, climbs on top and shoots at the drivers. The gunman jumps out, fires at Gates and is then shot by McClain.

=== McClain deduces that it was Joe who killed Sid ===
DeNisco is angry about the shooting and the flouting of proper procedure, but lets McClain and Gates borrow his car. They find an electronics shop owner who identifies the stolen ship-to-shore radio confiscated from Grant's car and points McClain to Joe Victor, the boat owner. McClain, accompanied by Gates, goes to confront Joe and accuses him of killing Sid Lammon for the money in his pocket. Joe runs, grabs a flare gun and points it at McClain who shoots, killing Joe. In the aftermath, McClain is thinking of turning in his badge, but Gates talks him out of it. DeNisco arrives on the scene and says, "I'm not even going to ask."

== Cast ==
- James Arness as Jim McClain
- Marshall Colt as Harry Gates
- George DiCenzo as Lt. DeNisco
- Conchata Ferrell as Vangie Cruise
- Carl Franklin as Jerry Cross
- Bibi Besch as Annie Lammon
- Scott Brady as Capt. Scofield
- George Loros as Joe Victor
- John Crawford as Salvi
- Keith Mitchell as Nicky Bannon
- Gerald S. O'Loughlin as Sid Lammon
- Luca Bercovici as Eddie Grant
- Cheryl Anderson as Grace
- Dominic Barto as Petrovic
- Don Maxwell as Officer Webster
- Donald V. Allen as Officer Caldwell
- Michael Fairman as Dr. Hallett
- J.P. Bumstead as Detective Sgt.
- George Fisher as Jailer
- John Tuell as Starkey
- Patrick Cameron as Uniformed Officer
- Ed McCready as Worker
- Corinne Bohrer as Vicki Thomas
- Eric Lawrence as 1st Officer
- Bill Handy as Owner
- Robert Balderson as Wheeler
- Frank Whiteman as Academy Instructor
- Shawn Michaels as Sgt. Evans
- Charles Young as Murdoch
- Carson Sipes as Scotty Lammon
- Gene Ross as Sunderland
- Darol Westbrook as Storeowner

== Cast notes ==
Although the African-American actress playing Detective Miller has a prolonged scene with dialogue, she is not listed in either the opening or closing credits. Also, Keith Mitchell, the child actor playing Nicky Bannon, who is billed fifth among the six guest stars listed in the opening credits, has no other known acting credits.

== Note regarding title ==
In the scene where Capt. Scofield sees Jim McClain, he exclaims, "Big Jim McClain!". The title of the 1952 film in which John Wayne and James Arness played Federal investigators tracking American Communist activity in Hawaii, was Big Jim McLain, with Wayne playing the title character, while Arness' character was named Mal Baxter.

== See also ==
- List of American films of 1981
