= Luca Bercovici =

American actor

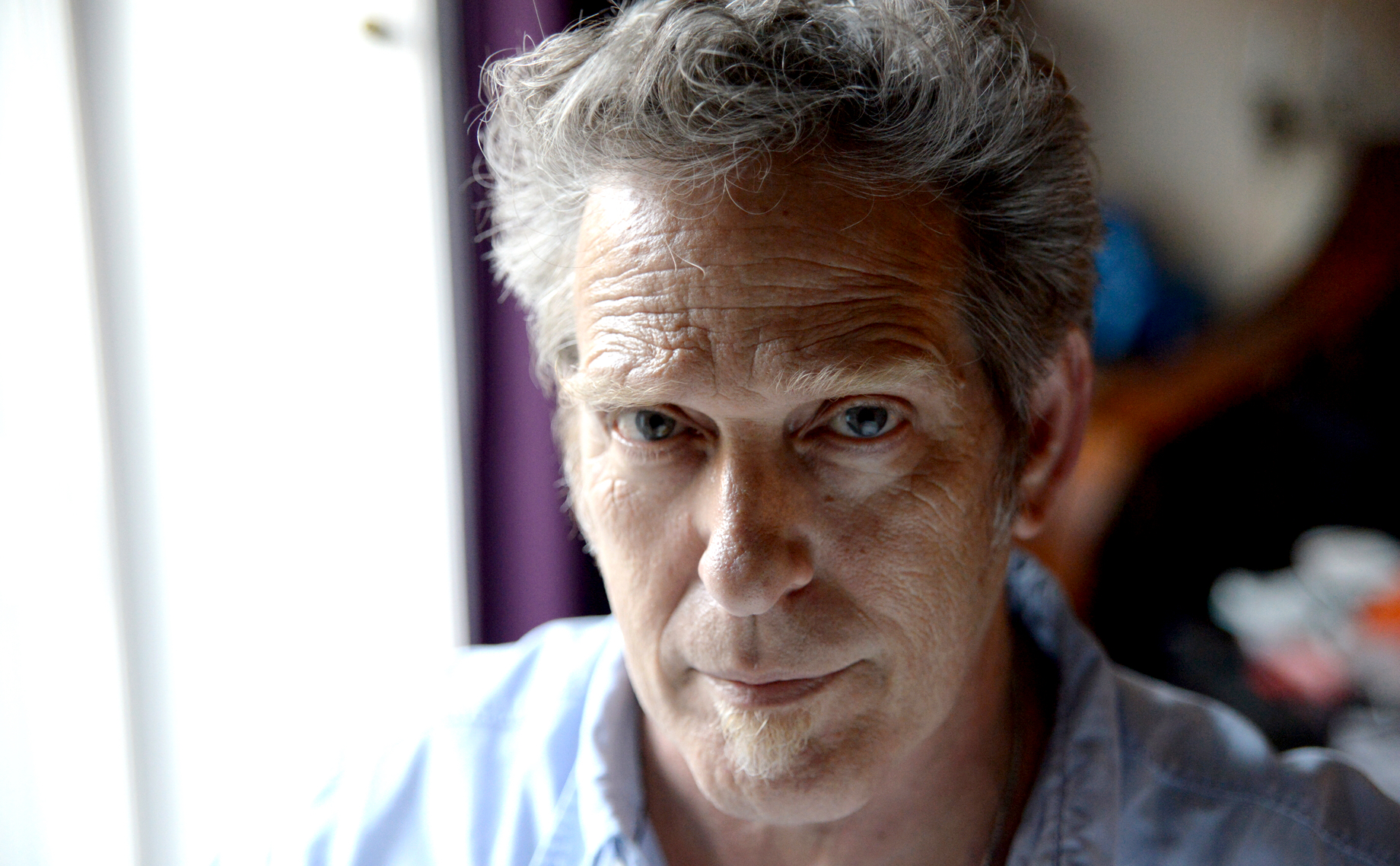
- Born: Luca Josef Bercovici; February 22, 1957 (age 69); New York, New York
- Occupations: Filmmaker, actor, director, writer and producer
- Known for: BlueDanube Films, co-founder
- Notable work: Ghoulies, American Flyers, Drop Zone, Clean and Sober, The Granny, Rockula
- Television: Terápia, producer
- Parent: Eric Bercovici (father)
- Relatives: Konrad Bercovici (great grand uncle)

Luca Bercovici (born February 22, 1957) is an American filmmaker, writer, producer and actor.

In 1979, as part of Bercovici's earliest involvements in filmmaking, he spent six months in Japan as a dialogue director for the miniseries, Shogun (1980), working primarily with the leading actress, Yôko Shimada, who was subsequently awarded the Golden Globe for her performance. Bercovici's acting career began in television with roles in Chicago Story and the made-for-TV movie Death of a Centerfold: The Dorothy Stratten Story with Jamie Lee Curtis and went on to starring in several more feature films of various genres during the 1980s and the 1990s. Bercovici has also written for Aaron Spelling Productions, Trimark, Warner Bros, Tapestry Films and many other production companies throughout his career.

In 1985, he made his directorial debut with the comedy horror film Ghoulies (1985), which he also co-wrote.

Until recently, Bercovici had been based in Hungary, Budapest for over a decade. Between 2009 and 2011, he was head of production for Raleigh Film Budapest and later co-founded, with Hungarian filmmaker, Gábor Váradi, BlueDanube Films, a full-service motion picture production company that provided production services as well as generating and creating original content in both English and Hungarian. Bercovici and Váradis' company produced the second season of the Hungarian version of in-treatment, Terápia, for HBO Europe, and provided production services for the American sci-fi TV series, 12 Monkeys (2015), as well as serving as co-producers on the Scott Hicks film, Fallen (2016).

In 2016, Bercovici signed on as executive producer on the sci-fi TV series Medinah – the first genre show from the Middle East to showcase at Comic-Con, and developed a close working relationship with Qatari director and producer Ahmed Al-Baker. Bercovici has since been based in Doha, Qatar as Director of Film Production, alongside Qatari filmmaker and executive producer, Ahmed Al-Baker, at Katara Studios - a full-service production company, post-production facility and music recording studio.

== Family ==
Bercovici is the son of television and Film producer Eric Bercovici and has worked on a number of projects written and or produced by his father, including 1979's Flesh & Blood, 1980's Shōgun, where Luca Bercovici was involved as a dialogue coach, two 1981 films — Chicago Story, which served as the pilot for the 1982 TV series Chicago Story, and McClain's Law, which served as the pilot for the 1981–82 series McClain's Law - Luca Bercovici was involved as an actor in both productions. In 1988's Noble House, he worked as a production assistant. His grandfather was Leonardo Bercovici, director, writer, and producer known for The Bishop's Wife, Portrait of Jennie, and The Lost Moment. He is also grand-nephew of writer Konrad Bercovici.

== Education ==
Bercovici attended College of the Redwoods where he studied with Carlo Mazzone-Clementi, Santa Monica City College, and Loyola Marymount University. Bercovici studied acting professionally with Jeff Corey and Lee Strasberg He is a graduate of the Joanne Baron / D.W. Brown Acting Studio.

== Career ==
=== Acting ===
Bercovici had a starring role in the Charles Band movie, Parasite (1982), with lead actress, Demi Moore, ultimately introducing him to the world of independent filmmaking. He also starred in early slasher film Frightmare (1983) directed by Norman Thaddeus Vane.

In 1985, Bercovici starred in beloved American sports drama, American Flyers (1985), directed by John Badham, where he played Barry 'The Cannibal' Muzzin and starred alongside Kevin Costner as Marcus Sommers. The film emphasizes the importance of family against a backdrop of bicycle racing, as well as championing the importance of setting high personal standards.

In the 1988 drama, Clean and Sober, directed by Glenn Gordon Caron, Bercovici was part of a great ensemble cast; in the role of Lenny, he performed alongside Morgan Freeman, and lead actor Michael Keaton. The movie received positive reviews, which praised the strong storyline addressing substance abuse, as well as the powerful performances of the cast.

Bercovici starred alongside Michael Keaton once again, as well as, Melanie Grifith, in her first role since Working Girl (1988), with the psychological thriller, Pacific Heights (1990), directed by John Schlesinger - the film has since been considered the first ever "eviction thriller" and was praised for its originality and realism.

In 1994, Bercovici reunited with director John Badham, taking part in his skydiving action thriller, Drop Zone (1994), with the role of Don Jagger, where he performed alongside Wesley Snipes and Gary Busey.

== Writing and directing ==
In 1979, Bercovici worked as a dialogue director for the shot-in-Japan miniseries, Shogun (1980). The series was based on the best-selling James Clavell novel of the same name - Shōgun, that told of the adventures of English navigator William Adams. The production was a key constituent of what is now considered the golden age of the mini-series.

In 1984, Bercovici co-wrote a feature film script, New Deal, which was purchased by 20th Century Fox, and in the same year, he made his successful directorial debut with Ghoulies (1984), a comedy horror he had also co-written. The film is now recognized as a certified cult classic and upon its release, it was the top grossing independent film in 1985, spawning three sequels in total, all of which, Bercovici had co-written.

A few years later, he co-wrote and directed his second feature, cult classic and musical comedy titled Rockula (1990), where he also appeared in the film, in the role of Pirate Chieftain. The Vampire comedy was beloved by audiences for its distinctive and nostalgic 80's feel.

In 1994 Bercovici went on to direct the thriller Dark Tide, starring Brigitte Bako and Richard Tyson. Through this production, Bercovici worked with costume designer and 3-time primetime Emmy nominee Shawn Holly Cookson, most known for her work on genre films, such as; The grudge (2004) and Tekken (2010). A few years later, Bercovici wrote and directed yet another comedy horror entitled The Granny (1995), where he also featured as the character Namon Ami. The film starred Stella Stevens and Shannon Whirry and was made for Tapestry Films and Warner Vision Films.

The Chain (1996), an action drama starring Gary Busey, is Bercovici's fifth feature film, which he had directed and co-written; it sold exceptionally well at AFM, and was picked up by Home Box Office (HBO) for its World Premiere. Bercovici directed another feature the following year for EGM International - a sci-fi mystery entitled, Convict 762 (1997).

Bercovici then went on to directing a romance thriller, BitterSweet (1999) starring James Russo and Eric Roberts, quickly followed by his eighth and most recently directed thriller, Luck of the Draw (2000) starring William Forsythe, Dennis Hopper, Eric Roberts, Ice-T & Michael Madsen. Years later, Bercovici worked with Romanian filmmaker, Bobby Barbacioru on a Horror thriller feature titled, "Hotel of the Damned" (2016); Bercovici had co-written the script with writer Paul Petcu. The film sparked a collaborative relationship between the two (Bercovici and Barbacioru), and would later result in the production of several more projects, among which were short films.

=== Producing ===
In 2011, Bercovici and Gábor Váradi, formed the production company BlueDanube Films, which entered into development on its first film, Lord of the Block, starring Eric Roberts, then went on to produce the second season of the HBO Europe series, Terápia. Bercovici and Váradi were part of the production team to bring the filming of A Good Day to Die Hard (2013), starring Bruce Willis to Budapest with Bercovici and Váradi serving as production supervisors on the film.

In 2013, Bercovici, produced and starred in the Romanian short film, entitled, Lela, written and directed by Bobby Barbacioru. In the same year, he produced yet another short film by Barbacioru, titled The Wind of Change.

In 2014 BlueDanube Films, provided production services for three episodes of the time-traveling themed sci-fi TV series, 12 Monkeys (2015), created by Travis Fickett and Terry Matalas. They also served as co-producers on the feature film, Fallen (2016) by director Scott Hicks.

Two years later, Bercovici Line Produced SAS: Red Notice, an upcoming 2020 action thriller, directed by Magnus Martens, starring Ruby Rose, Sam Heughan, Andy Serkis and Tom Wilkinson.

In 2016, Bercovici signed on as executive producer on the television series, Medinah, working with Qatari Director/Producer, Ahmed Al Baker. The show starred Eric Roberts, Natasha Henstridge, Tahmoh Penikett, and Rick Ravanello. The pioneering Middle-Eastern show, was shot in Doha, Qatar, and had made Rolling Stone magazine’s “25 Best Things We Saw at 2017 Comic-Con.”

In 2019, Bercovici worked as an executive producer on the shot-in-Qatar, documentary series/ docufiction, Bekasr taa (Breaking the Chains). the show was scripted by Katara Studios but co-produced by both Al-Jazeera Arabic and Katara studios, and distributed by Al-Jazeera. The docu-series is a first of its kind to be broadcast in Qatar, as it delves into sensitive, otherwise taboo societal issues, mostly pertaining to women, such as; domestic violence, postpartum depression, child marriage etc. The series utilizes first-hand stories of women in the Arab world of various nationalities, cross-cutting the interviews with unique cinematic dramatizations, to bring light to the victims' stories and emphasize the common voices and experiences of women that resonates across the globe.

From 2019 to present day, Bercovici rejoined Ahmed Al Baker at Katara Studios, in Doha as Director of Film Production.

== Personal life ==
Luca Bercovici is a third-generation screenwriter and director following the path of both his grandfather Leonardo Bercovici (1908-1995) and his father Eric Bercovici (1933–2014). Both of his brothers, Hilary Bercovici and Jacob Bercovici, have composed music for films.

== Filmography ==
=== Actor ===
- 1979 Flesh & Blood (TV Movie) as Bellhop
- 1980 Stone (TV Series)
- 1980 The Return of Frank Cannon (TV Movie) as Club Employee
- 1981 Chicago Story (TV Movie) as Dukes
- 1981 Death of a Centerfold: The Dorothy Stratten Story (TV Movie) as "Pooch"
- 1981 McClain's Law (TV Movie) as Eddie Grant
- 1981 The Ordeal of Bill Carney (TV Movie) as Bryan
- 1981-1985 Simon & Simon (TV Series) as Bobby Williams / Landers / Young Man In Bar
- 1981-1985 The Fall Guy (TV Series) as Winston
- 1982 Parasite as Ricus
- 1982 The Renegades (TV Movie) as "Blade"
- 1983 Frightmare as Saint
- 1983 Emergency Room (TV Movie) as Rudy
- 1983 Space Raiders as "Ace"
- 1983 For Love and Honor (TV Movie) as Thurston
- 1984-1986 Airwolf (TV Series) as Rusty Crawford
- 1984-1989 Mike Hammer (TV Series) as Milo's Main Torturer
- 1984-1990 Miami Vice (TV Series) as Hans Weiszeler
- 1985 American Flyers as Muzzin
- 1985-1987 Amazing Stories (TV Series) as Granville
- 1988 Clean and Sober as Lenny
- 1988 Andy Colby's Incredible Adventure as Space Raider
- 1989 Mortal Passions as Darcy
- 1990 Rockula as Pirate Chieftain
- 1990 Pacific Heights as Greg
- 1990 Lucky/Chances (TV Mini-Series) as Santino Bonnatti
- 1991 K2 as Dallas Wolf
- 1991-1999 Silk Stalkings (TV Series) as Lem Caine
- 1992 Live Wire as Salvatore (uncredited)
- 1992 Inside Monkey Zetterland as Boot Guy
- 1992 Sunset Heat as Detective Cook
- 1992 Mission of Justice as Roger Stockwell
- 1993 Mirror Images II as Clete Dyker
- 1993 A Twist of the Knife (TV Movie) as Mr. Macon
- 1993 Time Trax (TV Series) as Donald Reed
- 1993-1996 SeaQuest DSV (TV Series) as The Marauder
- 1994 Scanner Cop as Dr. Krench
- 1994 Drop Zone as Don Jagger
- 1994 Stranger by Night as Stan Richmond
- 1994-1997 M.A.N.T.I.S. (TV Series) as Randy Ferril
- 1994-2001 Diagnosis Murder (TV Series) as Cinnamon
- 1995 The Granny as Namon Ami
- 1996 The Chain as Shawn, The Clown
- 1996 Walker, Texas Ranger (TV Series) as Wade Atkins
- 1996 The Big Squeeze as Henry Mulhill
- 1996 One Clean Move (Short) as Oli
- 1996-1998 F/X: The Series (TV Series) as Wolf
- 1997 Angry Dogs
- 1997 BitterSweet as Fontain
- 1999 Sons of Thunder (TV Series) as Boris
- 1999-2000 Snoops (TV Series) as Randall Sealy
- 2001 Burning Down the House as Repo Man
- 2001 Dirt Boy as Dr. Ronald Klugard
- 2001 Hard Luck as Chris
- 2002 Flatland (TV Series) as Tao
- 2005 Eyes (TV Series) as Brian Furber
- 2007 Richard III as Brackenbury
- 2008 Stag Night as Tunnel Rat #1
- 2009 Night Train as Man
- 2012 Lela (Short) as The Dupe
- 2012 Letting Go as Joel's Father
- 2014 Houdini (TV Mini-Series) as Dr. Crandon
- 2015 The Childhood of a Leader as Older Foreign Gentleman
- 2018 Ruben Brandt, Collector as Kris Barutanski (voice)
- 2019 Seveled as Frank Davenport

=== Producer ===
- 1996 Waiting Game
- 2012 Lela
- 2013 Iris (producer - 2 episodes)
- 2013 The Wind of Change (executive producer)
- 2014 Black Soup (consulting producer)
- 2014 Fekete leves (consulting producer)
- 2014 Terápia (TV Series) (producer)
- 2015 Hotel of the Damned (co-producer)
- 2016 Fallen (co-producer)
- 2016 12 Monkeys (TV Series) (production executive - 3 episodes)
- 2017 Man to Man (TV Series) (production executive)
- 2017 Medinah (TV Series) (executive producer)
- 2019-2020 About Cinema (TV Series documentary) (executive producer)
- 2019 Bekasr taa / Breaking the Chains (TV Series documentary)

=== Director ===
- 1985 Ghoulies
- 1990 Rockula
- 1994 Dark Tide
- 1995 The Granny
- 1996 The Chain
- 1997 Convict 762
- 1999 Bitter Sweet
- 2000 Luck of the Draw
- 2006 The Making of 'Kill Your Darlings (TV Movie documentary)

=== Writer ===
- 1985 Ghoulies
- 1988 Ghoulies II
- 1990 Rockula
- 1991 Ghoulies Go to College
- 1994 Ghoulies IV
- 1995 The Granny
- 1996 The Chain
- 2000 Luck of the Draw
- 2014 Fekete leves
- 2015 Hotel of the Damned

=== First assistant director / Second unit director ===
- 2009 Night Train

=== Production Supervisor ===
- 2013 A Good Day to Die Hard
