= George DiCenzo =

American actor (1940–2010)

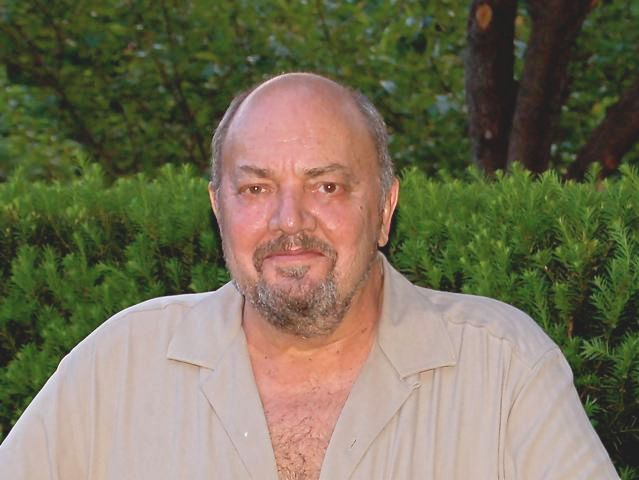
- DiCenzo in 2007
- Born: George Ralph DiCenzo; April 21, 1940; New Haven, Connecticut, U.S.
- Died: August 9, 2010 (aged 70); Washington Crossing, Pennsylvania, U.S.
- Occupations: Actor; acting teacher; producer
- Years active: 1970–2006
- Spouse: Donna Artz-DiCenzo (m. 1999)

George Ralph DiCenzo (April 21, 1940 – August 9, 2010) was an American actor and one-time associate producer of Dark Shadows. He was in show business for over 30 years, in film, TV, stage, and commercials. DiCenzo played Marty's grandfather Sam Baines in the film Back to the Future. He also had a minor role in William Peter Blatty's The Exorcist III.

== Life and career ==
DiCenzo was born in New Haven, Connecticut. He appeared in more than 30 feature films, including Close Encounters of the Third Kind (1977), The Choirboys (1977), The Frisco Kid (1979), The Ninth Configuration (1980), Back to the Future (1985), About Last Night (1986), Walk Like a Man (1987), The New Adventures of Pippi Longstocking (1988), 18 Again! (1988), Sing (1989) and The Exorcist III (1990).

He appeared in Hotel, directed by Mike Figgis, and Tempted, directed by Bill Bennett. He also played the late baseball commissioner A. Bartlett Giamatti in the television film Hustle about disgraced baseball great Pete Rose. In 2002 George played Ennio Salieri in the video game Mafia, and also provided the voice of Earnest Kelly in Grand Theft Auto: Vice City, released that same year.

In 1976, he appeared in the CBS television film Helter Skelter as prosecuting attorney Vincent Bugliosi. In the 1981–82 television season, DiCenzo was a regular on McClain's Law, with James Arness and Marshall Colt, starting with the television film McClain's Law, structured as the series' pilot. He appeared in the 1977 miniseries Aspen, the 1980 television film The Night the City Screamed, and made regular appearances on Murder, She Wrote, Law & Order and NYPD Blue.

His own series included Equal Justice and Joe's Life in the early and mid-1990s. He appeared as a guest star in the Law & Order: Criminal Intent episode "Semi-Professional". In the early 1990s, DiCenzo appeared on Broadway with Nathan Lane in On Borrowed Time.

DiCenzo's voice can be heard in commercials, audiobooks, and cartoon series. His roles in the latter include the title character in BlackStar (1981), Hordak in She-Ra: Princess of Power (1985–1986), and Captain America in Spider-Man (1981) and Spider-Man and His Amazing Friends (1981–1983). He was an acting teacher in New York City and Philadelphia for several years. He apprenticed under his mentor Milton Katselas at the Beverly Hills Playhouse.

== Death ==
DiCenzo died of sepsis on August 9, 2010, at the age of 70. He was buried in the North and Southampton Churchyard at Churchville, Bucks County, Pennsylvania.

== Filmography ==
=== Film ===
George DiCenzo film credits
Year	Title	Role	Notes
1970	House of Dark Shadows	Deputy	Uncredited
1971	Going Home	Sergeant	
1972	Across 110th Street	Patrolman	
1974	Shoot It Black, Shoot It Blue	George	
1975	The Swiss Family Robinson	Suramin	
1975	Las Vegas Lady	Eversull	
1977	Close Encounters of the Third Kind	Major Benchley	
1977	The Choirboys	Lieutenant Grimsley	
1979	The Frisco Kid	Darryl Diggs	
1980	The Ninth Configuration	Captain Fairbanks	
1981	Gangster Wars	Arnold Rothstein	
1981	McClain's Law	Lieutenant DeNisco	
1982	Breach of Contract		
1985	The Secret of the Sword	Hordak (voice)	
1985	Back to the Future	Sam Baines	
1986	The Longshot	DeFranco	
1986	About Last Night	Mr. Favio	
1986	Omega Syndrome	Philadelphia 'Phil' Horton	
1987	Walk Like a Man	Bob (Bub) Downs	
1988	The New Adventures of Pippi Longstocking	Mr. Blackhart	
1988	18 Again!	Coach	
1989	Sing	Mr. Marowitz	
1989	Face of the Enemy	James Wald	
1990	The Exorcist III	Stedman	
1992	Gypsy Eyes	Wyden	
1997	Lesser Prophets	Jerry	
1998	Illuminata	Jailor	
2000	It Had to Be You	Mel	
2001	Tempted	Byron Blades	
2001	Hotel	Boris	
2004	Stateside	Detective #2	
2006	A Guide to Recognizing Your Saints	Uncle George	(final film role)

=== Television ===
George DiCenzo television credits
Year	Title	Role	Notes
1973	Ironside	Joe	Episode: "Another Shell Game"
1973	Ironside	Paul Benson	Episode: "Downhill All the Way"
1973	Gunsmoke	Newt	Episode: "Susan Was Evil"
1974	Barnaby Jones	Sy Landau	Episode: "Foul Play"
1974	Kung Fu	Jesse	Episode: "The Predators"
1974	The Rockford Files	Harry Stoner	Episode: "Tall Woman in Red Wagon"
1975 Streets of San Francisco Frank Episode: Dead Air 1975	Gunsmoke	Mr. Bruce	Episode: "The Fires of Ignorance"
1975	S.W.A.T.	Owings	Episode: "Sole Survivor"
1975	Kojak	Harry Ferguson	Episode: "Be Careful What You Pray For"
1976	Helter Skelter	Vincent Bugliosi	Television film
1977	Aspen	Abe Singer	3 episodes
1977–1980	Hawaii Five-O	Len Sessup, Alika Kalei, Yuri Bloch	3 episodes
1979	The Waltons	Calvin Satterfield	2 episodes
1981	BlackStar	John Blackstar (voice)	13 episodes
1981	McClain's Law	Lt. DeNisco	Television film
1981–1982	McClain's Law	Lt. DeNisco	15 episode
1981–1983	Spider-Man and His Amazing Friends	Captain America, Cyclops, additional voices	24 episodes
1982	Spider-Man	Captain America (voice)	Episode: "The Capture of Captain America"
1984	Magnum, P.I.	M. Barry Aldridge	Episode: "Blind Justice"
1985–1986	She-Ra: Princess of Power	Hordak, Bow, additional voices	93 episodes
1987	The Equalizer	Frank Dorgan	Episode: "Memories of Manon"
1988	The Equalizer	Bruno Dominic	Episode: "A Dance on the Dark Side"
1980	The Night the City Screamed	Cliff Barrankos	Television film
1990–1991	Equal Justice	D.A. Arnold Bach	26 episodes
1991	Perry Mason: The Case of the Fatal Fashion	Albert Nardone	Television film
1991	In the Heat of the Night	Ramon Palez	Episode: "A Woman Much Admired"
1992	Law & Order	Eddie Palmieri	Episode: "The Working Stiff"
1993–1994	Batman: The Animated Series	Ubu (voice)	2 episodes
1993	Joe's Life	Stan Gennaro	11 episodes
1993	Animaniacs	Commandant (voice)	Episode: "Puttin' on the Blitz"
1995–1996	NYPD Blue	Pete Russell	2 episodes
1997	Law & Order	Sam "Bunny" Russo	Episode: "Barter"
2002	Law & Order: Criminal Intent	Judge Raoul Sabatelli	Episode: "Semi-Professional"
2004	Hustle	A. Bartlett Giamatti	Television film

=== Video games ===
Year	Title	Role	Notes
2002	Mafia	Ennio Salieri	
2002	Grand Theft Auto: Vice City	Earnest Kelly	
