= Love Is a Many Splendored Thing (TV series) =

- Genre: Soap opera
- Created by: Irna Phillips
- Starring: Donna Mills; Leslie Charleson; David Birney; Judson Laire; Andrea Marcovicci; Vincent Baggetta; Beverlee McKinsey; Diana Douglas; Robert Burr; Edward Power
- Country of origin: United States
- Original language: English
- No. of episodes: 1,430

Production
- Running time: 30 minutes

Original release
- Network: CBS
- Release: September 18, 1967 – March 23, 1973

Love Is a Many Splendored Thing is an American daytime soap opera that aired on CBS from September 18, 1967, to March 23, 1973. The series was created by Irna Phillips, who served as the first head writer. She was replaced by Jane Avery and Ira Avery in 1968, who were followed by Don Ettlinger, James Lipton and finally Ann Marcus. John Conboy served as producer for most of the show's run.

== Beginnings and controversy ==
The serial was a spin-off from the original 1955 20th Century-Fox film, although its title omitted the hyphen found in the film's title. In turn, the film was based on the 1952 autobiographical novel A Many-Splendoured Thing by Han Suyin. The show was originally a coproduction of CBS and 20th Century-Fox's television division.

Love Is a Many Splendored Thing focused on lives and loves in San Francisco, California. Its title sequence showed the title over a picture of the Golden Gate Bridge, with a slightly reworked rendition of the film's signature hit theme. In a rare move for daytime serials of the era, live shots of junk boats from Hong Kong were interspersed with pictures of the real San Francisco. In 1968, when CBS became sole producer and distributor of the show, its more well-known sequence was introduced showing just the picture of the Golden Gate Bridge. A revised version of the theme song was played by Eddie Layton, the long-time organist at Yankee Stadium and a popular recording artist. Layton played the Hammond X-66 (then owned by CBS) throughout most of his time on the program.

Veteran serial writer and creator Irna Phillips was hired to adapt the film for television, picking up the story some years after the end of the film. In the beginning, the star of the show was Nancy Hsueh as Mia Elliott, daughter to the characters portrayed by William Holden and Jennifer Jones in the 1955 film. Mia left Hong Kong to study medicine in San Francisco, her late father's hometown, and there she became involved with two men: Vietnam War pilot Paul Bradley, and, later, Dr. Jim Abbott. However, CBS censors balked at an interracial love story between a white man and an Amerasian woman. The network was also uncomfortable with a developing subplot in which Jim Abbott was implicated in the death of a young patient, the result of a botched abortion. Unwilling to compromise her story for CBS executives, Phillips quit the series, as the character of Mia Elliott was written out of the series in March 1968, never to be mentioned again. Phillips' resignation led to the end of Fox's role as coproducer and distributor.

In February 1968, Phillips was replaced by husband-and-wife writing team Ira and Jane Avery, who quickly refocused the series on two families, the Donnellys and the Elliotts. The Donnelly family was headed by widower Dr. Will Donnelly (Judson Laire), who had three adult children: Tom, a police lieutenant, Iris, a troubled college graduate and Laura, a fragile novitiate nun. The Elliotts consisted of wealthy Phillip and Helen Elliott and their son Mark (Sam Wade), a Vietnam War vet who was engaged to marry Iris but secretly desired her sister Laura. As with the Mia Eliott story, Love Is a Many Splendored Thing courted controversy again as Laura tried unsuccessfully to fight off carnal desires for her sister's boyfriend. A storm of controversy necessitated Laura's sudden departure from the church, and CBS dropped the storyline within weeks of Phillips' departure. However, the Averys continued to emphasize the conflict between two beautiful sisters who loved the same man, a plot that would bring the series strong fan devotion as well as a spike in the Nielsen ratings, and would drive the plotline for the remainder of the serial's network run.

== Storyline synopsis ==
1967: Mia Elliott, daughter of late war correspondent Mark Elliott and physician Han Suyin, arrives in San Francisco to study medicine. Mia meets Phillip and Helen Elliott, her aunt and uncle, cousin Mark Elliott, her father's namesake, and sisters Iris and Laura Donnelly. At first Mia dates pilot Paul Bradley (Nicholas Pryor), but she later develops a serious relationship with Dr. Jim Abbott (Robert Milli). Laura Donnelly, also known as Sister Cecilia (Donna Mills), fights her attraction to Mark Elliott as she prepares to take her final vows. Iris, unsure of Mark's feelings for her and sensing Laura's attraction to him, begins to drink heavily and consort with sneering playboy Jock Porter (John Karlen). During an argument with Mark, a drunken Iris crashes their car, but both escape serious injury.

1968 : When it is revealed that Jock Porter paid Jim Abbott to perform an illegal abortion on girlfriend Terry Andrews, who later died, a disenchanted Mia decides to return to Hong Kong. Iris becomes emotionally involved with Jim, but the scandal surrounding Terry Andrews forces him to leave San Francisco for New York. Laura decides not to take her final vows and leaves the church for Mark, who ends his relationship with Iris and begins a career as an architect. Lt. Tom Donnelly (Robert Burr) helps Helen (Grace Albertson, Gloria Hoye) overcome her grief when husband Phillip (Len Wayland) dies suddenly, and after a short courtship, the two marry. Iris finds herself attracted to Spencer Garrison (Michael Hanrahan, Edward Power) a handsome lawyer/senatorial candidate trapped in an unhappy marriage.

1969: Laura and Mark (now played by David Birney) marry, and shortly afterward, Laura discovers that she's pregnant. Spence leaves his insidious wife Nancy (Susan Browning) for Iris, who also becomes pregnant. During a flight to Lake Tahoe, Spence and Iris' private plane crashes, resulting in a serious brain injury that leaves Iris blinded. Mark has an extramarital affair with Jean Garrison (Jane Manning), the stepmother of Spence, that is publicly exposed after Jean's ex-husband Steve Hurley (Mark Gordon, Paul Stevens) is murdered. Mark's trial for murder causes Laura to miscarry their baby and have a nervous breakdown. Later, learning that she can never carry another child, Laura instigates divorce proceedings. After Iris learns that her brain injury will cause her death within a year, she and Spence agree that their baby would be better off with childless Laura; however, the court rejects the adoption on the grounds that Laura will be a single mother. Iris persuades Mark and Laura to reconcile for the sake of her baby, and gives birth to William Alex Garrison (Arthur Benoit, Jr.). Andy Hurley (Don Scardino, Russ Thacker) works for the 'Garrison for Senator' campaign and falls in love with Nikki Cabbott (Jody Locker), a ballerina who later is revealed to be his illegitimate sister. They plan to leave San Francisco, but she drops dead onstage while dancing.

1970: Tom (now played by Albert Stratton)'s relationship with Helen is strained by the arrival of his ex-wife Martha, an out-of-work actress now calling herself Julie Richards (Beverlee McKinsey). Julie threatens to sue for custody of their son Ricky (Shawn Campbell) if Tom and Helen don't pay her off. After Laura and Mark gain custody of Iris and Spence's son Billy (played by Thomas Beirne III), Iris is cured from experimental laser surgery performed by brilliant neurosurgeon Dr. Peter Chernak (Paul Michael Glaser, Michael Zaslow, Vincent Baggetta). Will is smitten with Peter's mother Lily (Diana Douglas), while Peter's independent sister Dr. Betsy Chernak (Andrea Marcovicci) also joins the hospital staff. When Iris demands that Laura give up custody of Billy (Thomas Beirne III), Laura goes insane and kidnaps the child, nearly killing them both in a car crash. Tom is arrested for the murder of Julie's conniving boyfriend Jim Whitman (Berkeley Harris), but eventually Julie confesses that she accidentally killed him during a violent argument, and she leaves town.

1971: A contrite Laura (now played by Veleka Gray) submits to psychiatric therapy and agrees to adopt a baby with husband Mark (now played by Michael Hawkins). Iris (now played by Bibi Besch) and Laura are delighted when their father Will marries Lily Chernak (Diana Douglas). Peter Chernak romances sweet Angel Allison (Suzie Kay Stone) and marries her, but has an extramarital fling with Jean Garrison. During their separation Angel is dating Dr. Doug Preston (Gene Lindsey). Visiting an orphanage, Laura and Mark decide to adopt a young girl named Maria (Judy Safran), unaware that she has a very troubled past. Laura then miraculously gets pregnant again. Jealous of Mark, Maria subtly manipulates tension into the Elliott marriage, and when she's unsuccessful at separating the couple, she locks Mark in the garage and sets it on fire, but Mark is ultimately saved. Maria is quickly turned in by her best friend Tommy Hale (Chris Pape). When Laura confronts Maria about trying to kill Mark in the fire, she chases her down the steps and falls. As a result of the fall, Laura suffers her second miscarriage. She is committed to a sanitarium. Tom decides to leave the police force and pursue a law degree.

1972: Betsy Chernak begins a stormy romance with Joe Taylor (Leon Russom) who runs a children's daycare but also works for Senator Al Preston, Spence's opponent in the Senatorial primary campaign and older brother of Dr. Doug Preston. Laura (now played by Barbara Stanger) is now out of the sanitarium and despondent over being childless. She drives Mark (now played by Tom Fuccello) to drink heavily. One night in a drunken stupor, he mistakes Iris for Laura and rapes her, resulting in a pregnancy. Fearing that the scandal will harm his chances for election in the 1972 Senatorial election, Iris agrees to keep the rape a secret and pass off the baby as Spence's child. However, blackmailer Walter Travis (John Carpenter) forces Joe Taylor into recording a meeting at Spence and Iris's apartment that ends up being cancelled when instead it turns out to be a conversation between Iris and Betsy, revealing Mark as a rapist and father of Iris' baby she is carrying. Travis plans to use the tape to get Spence to drop out of the race but the plan backfires when Senator Al Preston dies in a car crash. Peter reconciles with Angel, and they settle down in wedded bliss with their baby daughter, Nicole. Joe confides to Betsy that Walter Travis is blackmailing him over the murder of Travis' wife, Joe's lover, seven years ago. Iris gives birth to a baby girl she names Maggie. Spence finally wins the election to become San Francisco, California's next state senator.

1973 : While under Betsy's care in the hospital for minor surgery, Walter Travis is murdered with an overdose of Demerol. Fearing that Joe's possible involvement in Travis' wife's murder will surface, Betsy confesses to the crime. Tom agrees to represent Betsy, who confesses the truth to him. Tom and Joe discover that Travis actually murdered his wife, not Joe, and later prove that Al Preston's secretary Celia Winters (Abigail Kellogg) killed Travis. Joe promises Iris and Mark that Laura and Spence (now played by Brett Halsey) will never hear the truth about Maggie's parentage, but before she's committed to a sanitarium, a deranged Celia reveals the truth to Laura. Iris's ex-flame Dr. Jim Abbott (Ron Hale) returns to San Francisco nearly five years later along with his fiancée, Holly McCallister (Joan McMonagle), yet he never forgot Iris and pursues her even though she's married to Spence, who is now a state senator. Joe leaves the daycare to become Spence's administrative assistant while Holly becomes his secretary. Desperate for a baby, Laura schemes with Jim to get custody of Maggie after he figures out through a medical record that Mark is her biological father; however, Tom arranges a private adoption for Laura and Mark, and Laura reconciles her differences with Iris. Laura and Mark adopt a baby boy they name Philip Elliot. Peter learns that Angel has incurable cancer and vows to make her last days the happiest of her life.

In the final telecast on March 23, 1973, Joe and Betsy, surrounded by all of their friends and family, are married in a beautiful outdoor ceremony. Judson Laire, as Dr. Will Donnelly, steps out of character and addresses the audience, "There go Betsy and Joe, off to a new life. I think this is probably the happiest moment for the Donnellys and the Chernaks, the Garrisons, and the Elliotts, and the Taylors. But, it's a very sad moment for those of us actors who played those characters. I think by now most of you must know that Love Is a Many Splendored Thing is going off the air with this episode. On behalf of my fellow actors, I would like to tell you how much we enjoyed the privilege of coming into your home for these five and half years. It's not going to be easy for us; it's hard to say goodbye. But, maybe we'll live on in your memories. It now becomes my sad duty to say goodbye to you on behalf of the entire company: the cast, the crew, the production staff, the writers and the directors ... all of us. Goodbye, and God bless you."

== Broadcast history ==
Love Is a Many Splendored Thing owed its existence to CBS daytime head Fred Silverman, who openly favored serials over game shows. Its predecessor at 2:00 p.m. Eastern time was the original run of Password, which had run aground against NBC's serial Days of Our Lives and ABC's The Newlywed Game. However, Love Is a Many Splendored Thing struggled against its competition and could not maintain the viewers from its lead-in, the top-rated serial As the World Turns.

On September 11, 1972, CBS moved Love Is a Many Splendored Thing to 3:00 p.m. ET. Procter & Gamble, which produced four of the network's serials, wanted its shows aired consecutively. CBS moved Guiding Light, which had been airing at 2:30 p.m. ET since its expansion to 30 minutes in 1968, into Love Is a Many Splendored Thing's former 2:00pm timeslot and moved The Edge of Night from its longtime 3:30 p.m. ET slot to 2:30 p.m. to complete the request; the schedules of As the World Turns, which aired at 1:30 p.m., and Search for Tomorrow, which aired at 12:30 p.m., were unaffected and the network did not program the 30 minutes between those shows. Shortly before the time change, the show's subject matter was changed from a love story to political intrigue and blackmail. Despite having maintained fairly strong ratings throughout its run, averaging an 8.5 rating and 29% share, Love Is a Many Splendored Thing still struggled in its new timeslot of 3:00 p.m. against two new competitors: ABC's General Hospital and NBC's Another World, which consistently won the timeslot. These same two soaps also competed against sister CBS soap The Secret Storm in this timeslot six years earlier. On February 12, 1973, CBS announced that Love Is a Many Splendored Thing would end its run on March 23. The Young and the Restless debuted the following Monday.

The lead characters on Love Is a Many Splendored Thing were recast multiple times. The departure of stars Charleson, Birney and Mills led to a revolving door of cast replacements, such as Bibi Besch. The show focused upon other characters, such as the strong-willed Betsy Chernak Taylor (Andrea Marcovicci), and complex storylines involving politics and blackmail, but its ratings failed to recover quickly enough to avoid cancellation.

Immediately after the cancellation, CBS moved the highly popular The Price Is Right into the vacant timeslot,

=== Executive producers ===
Name
Charles Weiss and Joseph Hardy

=== Head writers ===
Name
Irna Phillips
Jane and Ira Avery
Dan Ettinger
James Lipton
Ann Marcus

== Legacy ==
The show is notable for its strong focus on young characters. Along with ABC's Dark Shadows, Love Is a Many Splendored Thing particularly targeted young viewers along with soap operas' traditional audience. The show predated the premieres of One Life to Live (1968) and All My Children (1970), two other soap operas that also attracted young audiences.

Organist Eddie Layton introduced the influences of jazz and pop music to the show's score in contrast to the heavy symphonic and theatrical organ style of more established soap operas. Later soaps would continue to move away from organ music to contemporary light orchestral and synthesizer-based scoring.

== Surviving episodes ==
All 1,430 episodes of Love Is a Many Splendored Thing were recorded on videotape at the CBS Broadcast Center Studio #41 in New York City. As with most soap operas of the late 1960s and early 1970s, the show's tapes were routinely wiped for reuse. Although the master tapes were erased, some rare kinescopes of episodes remain in the possession of private collectors. Only seven videotapes of the series are confirmed to exist, archived as non-circulating copies at the UCLA Film and Television Archive. The archived episodes were telecast on March 8, 16 and 24, 1971, April 1 and 9, 1971 and March 12 and 20, 1973.

A 1967 kinescope episode in the public domain episode may be viewed at the Internet Archive.

== Awards and nominations ==
Prior to its cancellation, the show was nominated for four Emmy Awards:

- 1971: Outstanding Achievement in Daytime Programming
  - James Angerame, technical director
  - Victor L. Paganuzzi, art director; John A. Wendell, set decorator
- 1973: Outstanding Achievement by Individuals in Daytime Drama
  - Peter Levin, director
  - Victor Paganuzzi, scenic designer; John A. Wendell, set decorator

== Ratings ==
- 1967–1968 season: #11, 7.9 rating
- 1968–1969 season: #8, 9.0 rating
- 1969–1970 season: #5, 9.5 rating
- 1970–1971 season: #9, 9.2 rating
- 1971–1972 season: #9, 8.0 rating
- 1972–1973 season: #14, 7.1 rating

== Cast ==
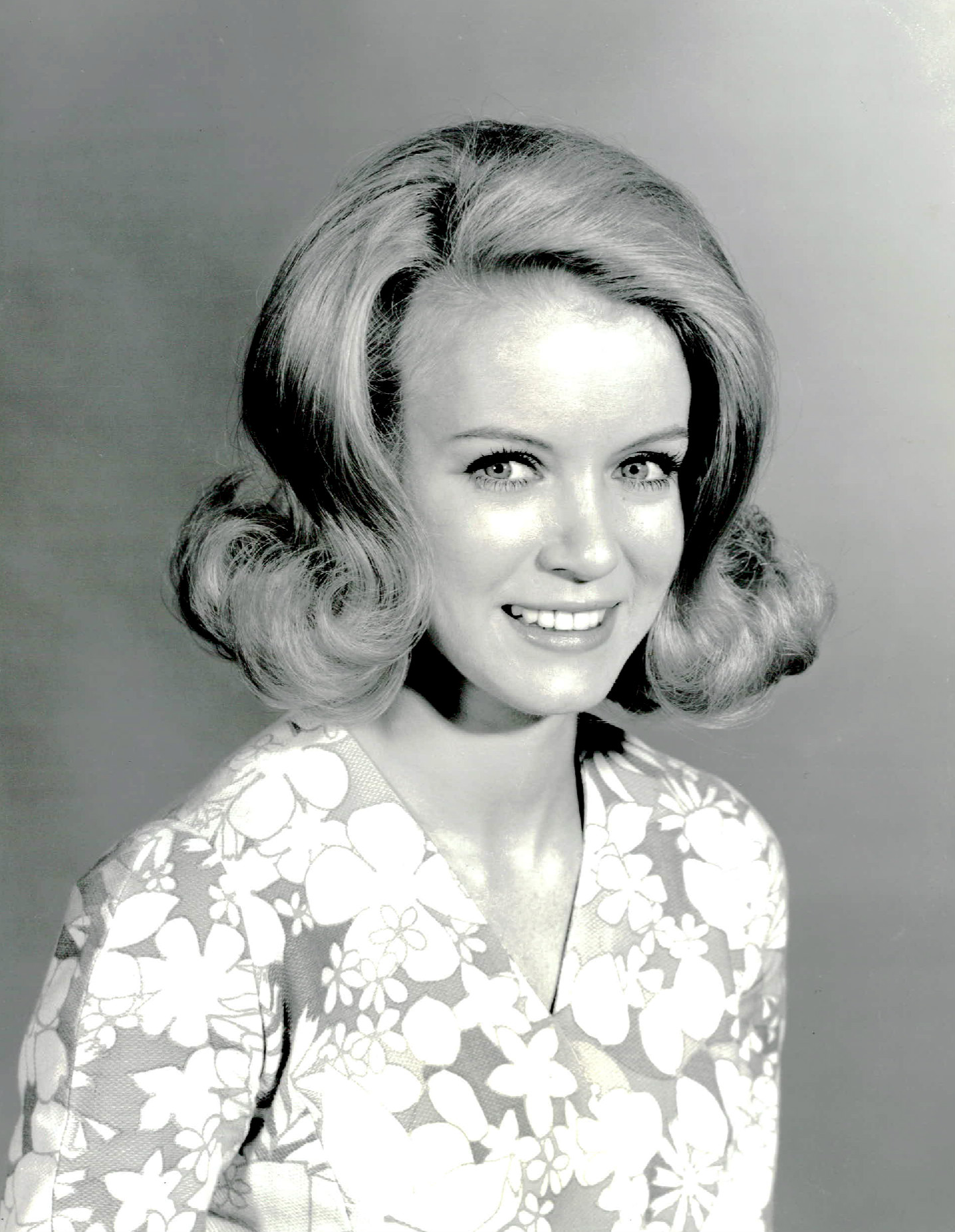
Donna Mills as Laura Donnelly Elliott in 1967

- Nancy Hsueh : Mia Elliott (9/1967-3/1968) original cast
- Thomas Beirne III: Baby Billy (1970)
- Robert Milli : Dr. Jim Abbott #1 (9/1967-6/1968) original cast
- Ron Hale : Dr. Jim Abbott #2 (1/1973-3/1973)
- Nicholas Pryor : Paul Bradley (9/1967-3/1968) original cast
- Judson Laire : Dr. Will Donnelly (9/1967-3/1973) original cast
- Grace Albertson : Helen Elliott Donnelly #1 (9/67-3/68) original cast
- Gloria Hoye : Helen Elliott Donnelly #2 (3/1968-3/23/1973)
- Leslie Charleson : Iris Donnelly Garrison #1 (9/1967-12/29/1970) original cast
- Bibi Besch : Iris Donnelly Garrison #2 (1/4/1971-3/23/1973)
- Donna Mills : Laura Donnelly Elliott #1 (9/1967-9/18/1970) original cast
- Veleka Gray : Laura Donnelly Elliott #2 (9/21/1970-1/26/1972)
- Barbara Stanger : Laura Donnelly Elliott #3 (1/28/1972-3/23/1973)
- Robert Burr : Lt. Tom Donnelly #1 (9/1967-8/1969) original cast
- Albert Stratton : Lt. Tom Donnelly #2 (9/1969-3/23/1973)
- Shawn Campbell : Ricky Donnelly (9/1967-3/23/1973) original cast
- Len Wayland : Phillip Elliott #1 (9/1967-3/1968) original cast
- Sam Wade : Mark Elliott #1 (9/1967-3/1969) original cast
- David Birney : Mark Elliott #2 (3/1968-6/1970)
- Michael Hawkins : Mark Elliott #3 (6/1970-11/12/1971)
- Vince Cannon : Mark Elliott #4 (11/15/1971-1/26/1972)
- Tom Fuccello : Mark Elliott #5 (1/28/1972-3/23/1973)
- John Karlen : Jock Porter (1967–68)
- Judith Searle : Dr. Dorothy Knowland(1967)
- Don Scardino : Andy Hurley #1 (1968)
- Russ Thacker : Andy Hurley #2 (1969)
- Paul Stevens : Steve Hurley #1 (1968)
- Mark Gordon : Steve Hurley #2(1969)
- Martin Wolfson : Chandler Garrison #1 (1968)
- William Post Jr. : Chandler Garrison #2(1968–1971)
- Terry Logan : Dr. John Hale (1968–1970)
- Jane Manning : Jean Hurley Garrison (1968-1/31/1971; 3/23/73)
- Michael Hanrahan : Spencer Garrison #1 (3/1968-4/1968)
- Edward Power : Spencer Garrison #2 (5/1968-11/1972)
- Brett Halsey : Spencer Garrison #3(12/4/1972-3/23/1973)
- Susan Browning : Nancy Garrison (1968–1969)
- Flora Campbell : Margaret Garrison (1969–1970)
- Karl Light: Dr. Burger (1970–1973)
- Robert Drew : Dr. Ellis (1969; 1971–1972)
- Suzie Kaye Stone : Angel Allison Chernak (1969-3/23/73)
- Jody Locker : Nikki Cabot (1969)
- Beatrice Ballance : Kim Hale (1969–1970, 1973)
- Paul Michael Glaser : Dr. Peter Chernak #1 (12/1969-6/1970)
- Michael Zaslow : Dr. Peter Chernak #2 (6/1970)
- Vincent Baggetta : Dr. Peter Chernak #3 (6/1970-3/23/1973)
- Diana Douglas : Lily Chernak Donnelly (6/1970-3/1973)
- Andrea Marcovicci : Dr. Betsy Chernak Taylor (6/1970-3/23/1973)
- Beverlee McKinsey : Julie Richards (1970-3/1971)
- Joseph Boley : Charlie (1970)
- Carmen Maya : Elizabeth (1970)
- Robert Drew : Dr. Ellis (1970; 11/71-1/28/72)
- Berkeley Harris : Jim Whitman (1970-3/71, 3/1973)
- Arthur Benoit Jr. : William Alex Garrison (1970)
- James Burdge : Sam Watson (1970-1/28/1972)
- Joseph Stern : Larry Hale (1969–70)
- Stephen Joyce : Dr. Sanford Hiller (12/1971-1972; 1972–1973)
- Peter White : Dr. Sanford Hiller (1972)
- Constance Towers : Marian Hiller (12/1971-1972)
- Christopher Pape : Tommy Hale (12/1971-1/31/1972)
- Fred J. Scollay : Police Chief Rame (12/1972-1/1973)
- Judy Safran : Maria (1/1971 to 10/1971)
- Abigail Kellogg : Celia Winter (1/1972-1/1973)
- Gene Lindsey : Dr. Doug Preston (9/1971-12/1972)
- Sasha von Scherler : Sarah Hanley (1/70-1972; 3/23/73)
- Don Gantry: Senator Al Preston (1/1972-9/1972)
- Leon Russom : Joe Taylor (1/1972-3/23/1973)
- David Groh : Simon Ventnor (1972-1/1973)
- John Carpenter : Walter Travis (1972)
- Andrea Grossman : Nicole Chernak (1972–1973)
- P.J. Soles : Unknown (1973)
- Betty Miller : Mrs. Taylor (1972-3/23/73)
