= Gerald S. O'Loughlin =

American actor (1921–2015)

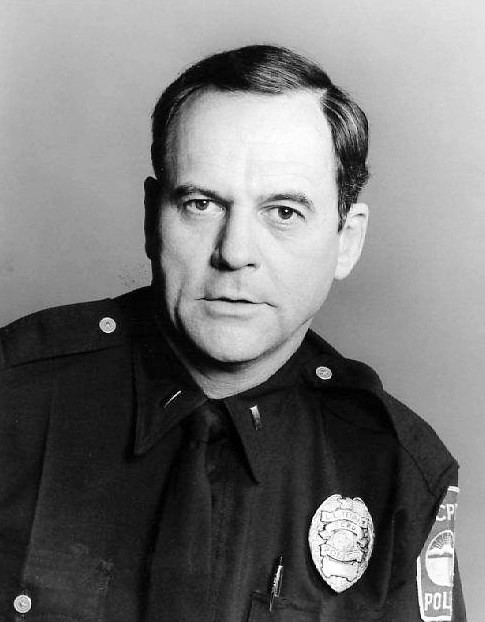
- O'Loughlin as Eddie Ryker in The Rookies
- Born: Gerald Stuart O'Loughlin Jr. December 23, 1921; New York City, U.S.
- Died: July 31, 2015 (aged 93); Los Angeles, California, U.S.
- Education: Neighborhood Playhouse School of the Theatre; Actors Studio
- Occupations: Actor, director
- Years active: 1952–2008
- Spouse: Meryl O'Loughlin (m. 1966; div. 1976)
- Children: 2; including Chris O'Loughlin

Gerald Stuart O'Loughlin Jr. (December 23, 1921 – July 31, 2015) was an American television, stage, and film actor and director who was primarily known for playing tough-talking and rough-looking characters. He is best known for Ed Ryker on The Rookies (1972–1976).

== Overview ==
After a stint with the United States Marine Corps, O'Loughlin used his GI Bill of Rights benefits to train at the Neighborhood Playhouse School of the Theatre in New York City. Continuing to hone his skills at the Actors Studio, he would land a handful of TV and/or film roles throughout the 1950s.

== Early years ==
O'Loughlin was a native of New York City. Before becoming an actor, he earned a college degree in mechanical engineering.

== Military service ==
O'Loughlin served two tours of duty in the Marines, enlisting during World War II and being recalled to active duty for the Korean War.

== Television ==
It was during the 1960s and 1970s, however, that O'Loughlin would become virtually ubiquitous on TV, his workload decreasing only slightly during the century's final two decades. One of his early guest-starring roles was on "A Man for Mary" episode of ABC's 1962 comedy-drama Going My Way.

He appeared in "Twenty Miles from Dodge", a 1965 episode of Gunsmoke. O'Loughlin played a tough but not insensitive gang leader of stagecoach robbers holding the passengers as hostages for ransom. Among them was Miss Kitty (Amanda Blake), who comforts the freezing and hungry while battling the desperadoes, and a feisty, crafty fellow passenger played by Darren McGavin. Years later, O'Loughlin reunited with Gunsmoke lead actor James Arness in the made-for-TV film McClain's Law, structured as the pilot for Arness' 1981–82 police detective series. He also appeared on Quincy, M.E. as Adam Beale, chief of a hijack containment unit, working to take down terrorists hijacking a plane with a fatal virus on board.

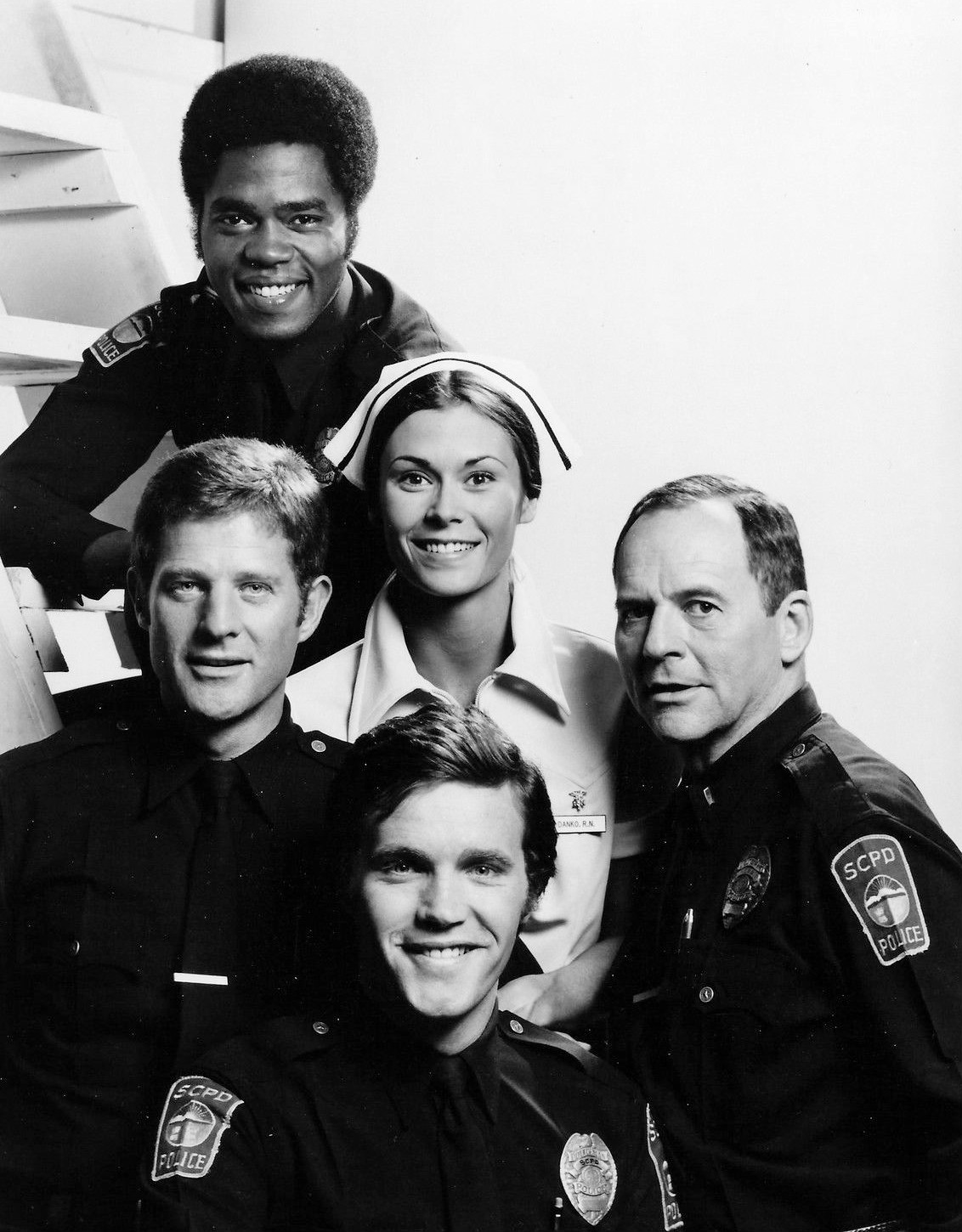
Cast photo of The Rookies. Clockwise from the top: Georg Stanford Brown (Terry Webster), Kate Jackson (Jill Danko), Gerald S. O'Loughlin (Eddie Ryker), Bruce Fairbairn (Chris Owens) and Sam Melville (Mike Danko) in 1975

O'Loughlin appeared in an episode of the 1961 television series The Asphalt Jungle. In 1966 he portrayed truck driver Carl Munger (S2:Ep7) and in 1972 he portrayed a robber named Kulhane (S7:Ep21) in the TV series The F.B.I.

He appeared in three episodes of Hawaii Five-O. The first was aired January 29, 1969 in the episode "The Box". O'Loughlin played the central figure of a group of prison inmates who take Hawaii Five-O chief Steve McGarrett (Jack Lord) hostage. The second was called "Six Kilos" and was broadcast on March 12, 1969 (playing the same character as in "The Box"), and the third (September 16, 1970) was called "A Time to Die". He also appeared on Cannon on February 22, 1972, in the episode "Flight of the Hawks", and on episode 16 of the TV show The Green Hornet. In Season 2 Episode 22 of Mission: Impossible, he played a killer for hire.

In 1970–1971, O'Loughlin portrayed Devin McNeil in the CBS crime drama Storefront Lawyers (which was later revised and retitled and became Men at Law).

From 1972 to 1976 O'Loughlin appeared as Lt. Ed Ryker on The Rookies. In 1978, he appeared in the pilot episode of The Eddie Capra Mysteries, and had roles in TV miniseries such as Wheels (1978), Women in White (1979), Roots: The Next Generations (1979) and Blind Ambition (1979). He also appeared as Sgt. O'Toole in the 1983 made-for-TV miniseries The Blue and the Gray. Also in 1983, he appeared as Gen. Schwerin, hoping to meet Marilyn Monroe, in the M*A*S*H episode "Bombshells". He was also a regular on the series Automan (1983) and Our House (1986). Also in 1986, O'Loughlin played the part of Mr. Parks in a first season episode of Highway to Heaven entitled "The Brightest Star".

In 1988, he played Tom Callahan in Dirty Dancing. In 1992 he appeared as Ben Oliver in Murder, She Wrote in the episode "Badge of Honor".

== Stage ==
O'Loughlin's professional acting career began in repertory work at Crystal Lake Theatre in upstate New York. He played Cheswick in the stage version of One Flew Over the Cuckoo’s Nest at the Cort Theatre beginning in 1963. The highlight of O'Loughlin's stage career was a national tour of A Streetcar Named Desire as Stanley Kowalski, opposite Tallulah Bankhead as Blanche DuBois.

== Film ==
O'Loughlin's movie credits include Ensign Pulver, In Cold Blood, Ice Station Zebra, The Valachi Papers and Twilight's Last Gleaming.

== Personal life and death ==
O'Loughlin and his then-wife Meryl Abeles had two children: Chris O'Loughlin (born 1967), a member of the 1992 United States Olympic épée fencing team, and Laura O'Loughlin.

O'Loughlin died of natural causes at the age of 93 in Los Angeles on July 31, 2015.

== Filmography ==
Year	Title	Role	Notes
1956	Lovers and Lollipops	Larry	
1957	A Hatful of Rain	Church	
1958	Cop Hater	Detective Mike Maguire	
1964	Ensign Pulver	LaSueur	
1966	A Fine Madness	Chester Quirk – Policeman	
1966	A Man Called Adam	Red – the Sheriff	
1967	In Cold Blood	Harold Nye	
1968	Ice Station Zebra	Lt. Cdr. Bob Raeburn	
1969	Riot	Grossman	
1970	The Virginian	Lute Dormer Sr	season 8 episode 18 ("Train of Darkness")
1971	Desperate Characters	Charlie	
1971	The Organization	Jack Pecora	
1972	The Valachi Papers	Ryan	
1972	Room 222	Sid LeRoi	season 3 episode 22 ("The Quitter")
1977	Twilight's Last Gleaming	Brig. Gen. O'Rourke	
1977	Murder at the World Series	Moe Gold	
1978	The Eddie Capra Mysteries	Ed Schroder	Pilot: "Nightmare at Pendragon Castle
1978	Crash	Larry Cross	
1981	McClain's Law	Sid Lammon	made-for-TV film
1982	Frances	Lobotomy Doctor	
1983	Automan	Capt. E. G. Boyd	
1984	Crimes of Passion	Ben	
1984	City Heat	Counterman Louie	
1986	Quicksilver	Mr. Casey	
1986	Our House	Joe Kaplan	
1998	The Secret Kingdom	Chartwell	
2000	3 Strikes	Judge	
