= Bibi Besch =

Austrian-American actress (1942–1996)

- Born: Bibiana Maria Köchert; February 1, 1942; Vienna, Reichsgaue of the Ostmark, German Reich
- Died: September 7, 1996 (aged 54); Los Angeles, California, U.S.
- Occupation: Actress
- Years active: 1954–1996
- Spouse: Donald B. Mathis (m. 1965; div. 1973)
- Children: Samantha Mathis
- Parents: Gotfrid Köchert (father); Gusti Huber (mother)

Bibi Besch (born Bibiana Maria Köchert; February 1, 1942 – September 7, 1996) was an Austrian-American film, television, and stage actress. She is best known for her portrayal of Dr. Carol Marcus in the science fiction film Star Trek II: The Wrath of Khan (1982). Her other notable film roles were in Who's That Girl (1987), and Tremors (1990). Besch also appeared in a number of television productions, including the television film The Day After (1983) and The Jeff Foxworthy Show, and received two Primetime Emmy Award nominations.

== Early life ==
Bibiana Maria Köchert was born in Vienna in 1942, the younger of two daughters born to theater actress Gusti Huber, who was a film star in Nazi Germany during World War II, and Gotfrid Köchert, an Austrian yacht racer, who served in the Wehrmacht. She had an elder sister, Christiana Barbara Köchert. Huber and her two daughters remained in Vienna throughout World War II.

Huber had divorced Köchert when she met Joseph Besch, a U.S. Army captain, in Germany; the couple married in 1946, with Huber's daughters taking his surname, and the new family moved to the United States. Huber and Besch later had two children together, Drea and Andrew, the half-siblings of Bibiana and Christiana.

Besch married Donald Mathis in 1965, and had one child together, actress Samantha Mathis, born in 1970.

== Career ==
Most of Besch's early TV experience came from years spent on New York-based daytime soap operas — The Secret Storm (1966), The Edge of Night (1969), Love Is a Many Splendored Thing (1973) and Somerset (1974). In later years she was seen in primetime soaps, such as Secrets of Midland Heights (1980), The Hamptons (1983), Dynasty (1984), Dallas (1985), Falcon Crest (1985-1986), Knots Landing (1989) and an episode of Melrose Place which aired on September 9, 1996, two days after her death.

Besch guest starred in a variety of television series, including Street Hawk, The Rockford Files, The Golden Girls, Murder, She Wrote, Backstairs at the White House, and It's Garry Shandling's Show. Having appeared on a 1979 episode of James Arness' western series, How the West Was Won, she reunited with him in the 1981 made-for-TV film McClain's Law which served as the two-hour debut episode of Arness' 1981–82 same-named police detective series.

She played Dr. Carol Marcus, the early love of Admiral James T. Kirk in Star Trek II: The Wrath of Khan (1982). Her other films included Victory at Entebbe (1976), The Pack (1977), The Promise (1979), Meteor (1979), The Beast Within (1982), The Lonely Lady (1983), The Day After (1983), Mrs. Delafield Wants to Marry (1986), He's My Girl (1987), Who's That Girl (1987), Date with an Angel (1987), Steel Magnolias (1989), Tremors (1990), and Betsy's Wedding (1990).

In 1992, she received an Emmy Award nomination for her performance in Doing Time on Maple Drive, which starred William McNamara and Jim Carrey as her sons. She received another Emmy nomination in 1993 for her recurring-character role as the neurotic mother of Janine Turner's character on Northern Exposure. She continued to act until her death in 1996, having amassed well over 100 television and film credits.

== Death ==
Bibi Besch died on September 7, 1996, aged 54 from breast cancer at the Daniel Freeman Hospital in Los Angeles.

== Filmography ==
Year	Title	Role	Notes
1975	Distance	Joanne Morse	
1976	Victory at Entebbe	German Woman	TV movie
1977	The Pack	Marge	
1977	Peter Lundy and the Medicine Hat Stallion	Emily Lundy	TV Movie
1977	The Rockford Files	Monica Steele	Episode: Beamer's Last Case
1978	The Six Million Dollar Man	Countess Lysandra Korischeva	Episode: The Madonna Caper
1979	Hardcore	Mary	
1979	The Promise	Dr. Faye Allison	
1979	Meteor	Helen Bradley	
1981	McClain's Law	Annie Lammon	TV movie
1982	The Beast Within	Caroline MacCleary	
1982	Star Trek II: The Wrath of Khan	Dr. Carol Marcus	
1983	The Lonely Lady	Veronica Randall	
1983	The Day After	Eve Dahlberg	TV movie
1983	Likely Stories, Vol. 3	Beth Warner	
1984	Cagney & Lacey	Linda Carson	Episode: Matinee
1986	Mrs. Delafield Wants to Marry	Doreen Delafield	TV movie
1987	Who's That Girl	Mrs. Worthington	
1987	He's My Girl	Marcia	
1987	Date with an Angel	Grace Sanders	
1988	Family Ties	Dr. Hewitt	
1989	Kill Me Again	Jack's Secretary	
1989	The Golden Girls	Helen Budd	Episode: Sick and Tired (part 2)
1989	Steel Magnolias	Belle Marmillion	
1990	Night Court	Mrs. Rollins	
1990	Tremors	Megan, the Doctor's wife	
1990	Betsy's Wedding	Nancy Lovell	
1991	Lonely Hearts	Maria Wilson	
1992	Doing Time on Maple Drive	Lisa Carter	TV movie
1992–1993	Northern Exposure	Jane O'Connell	2 Episodes: "Burning Down the House" and "Grosse Pointe, 48230"
1995	My Family	Mrs. Gillespie	
1996	Melrose Place	Mrs. Davis	Episode Aired Posthumously
1999	California Myth	Harriet	(final film role)

== Awards and nominations ==
Year	Award	Category	Nominated work	Result
1984	4th Golden Raspberry Awards	Worst Supporting Actress	The Lonely Lady	Nominated
1992	44th Primetime Emmy Awards	Outstanding Supporting Actress in a Miniseries or a Special	Doing Time on Maple Drive	Nominated
1993	45th Primetime Emmy Awards	Outstanding Guest Actress in a Drama Series	Northern Exposure	Nominated
