= Clean and Sober =

1988 film directed by Glenn Gordon Caron

- Theatrical release poster
- Directed by: Glenn Gordon Caron
- Written by: Tod Carroll
- Produced by: Tony Ganz; Deborah Blum
- Starring: Michael Keaton; Kathy Baker; Morgan Freeman; M. Emmet Walsh; Tate Donovan
- Cinematography: Jan Kiesser
- Edited by: Richard Chew
- Music by: Gabriel Yared
- Production company: Imagine Entertainment
- Distributed by: Warner Bros. Pictures
- Release date: August 10, 1988 (United States)
- Running time: 124 minutes
- Country: United States
- Language: English
- Budget: $12 million
- Box office: $8,674,093

Clean and Sober is a 1988 American drama film directed by Glenn Gordon Caron and starring Michael Keaton as a real estate agent struggling with a substance abuse problem. This film was Keaton's first dramatic departure from comedies. The supporting cast includes Kathy Baker, M. Emmet Walsh, Morgan Freeman, Luca Bercovici and Tate Donovan. The film received strong acclaim, but was a box-office flop.

Ron Howard, who previously directed Keaton in the comedies Night Shift (1982) and Gung Ho (1986), served as co-producer.

== Plot ==
Daryl Poynter is a successful but self-destructive Philadelphia real estate salesman who is addicted to cocaine and alcohol. He embezzles $92,000 of his company's money from an escrow account and spends $52,000 of it between cocaine buys and playing the stock market. Waking up one morning next to a woman who suffered a heart attack from a cocaine overdose, he tries to cover up their drug use, but the police make it clear that they know what happened. The woman's family blames Daryl for her death. Fearing arrest for the woman's death and embezzling his company's funds, Daryl goes to the airport to try to flee the country but his credit card is declined and he has no cash. His colleague Martin also refuses to put him up for a couple of weeks.

Daryl learns of a drug rehabilitation program on the radio which lasts about a month and which guarantees anonymity. He checks in, figuring he can hide out there. While in rehab he meets Craig, a tough but supportive drug rehabilitation counselor. With great difficulty, Craig helps Daryl to realize he is an addict and that his life is complete chaos. Craig teaches Daryl the maxim, "The best way to break old habits is to make new ones."

At a 12-step meeting, Daryl tries to get "eligible" women to sponsor him, but they turn him down. He then meets the older, reformed addict bank officer Richard Dirks, who agrees to act as his sponsor in Alcoholics Anonymous. While discussing Step 4, Richard eventually encourages Daryl to confess his embezzlement to his employer. Daryl agrees but tries to shirk responsibility by blaming the dead woman he spent the night with. Incredulous, Daryl's employer fires him, though he skirts legal responsibility for his actions.

Daryl becomes attracted to a fellow patient, a woman named Charlie Standers. She is a steel foundry worker who is addicted to alcohol and cocaine. Charlie is involved in an abusive relationship with her boyfriend, Lenny, a fellow addict to whom Charlie acts as a codependent. Daryl falls in love with Charlie and urges her to leave Lenny. He finally succeeds in persuading her to leave, only to witness Lenny's manipulative way of winning her back.

Genuinely concerned for her well-being, Daryl tries to remain in Charlie's life to help her stay sober. After another fight with Lenny, she leaves the house (perhaps to return to Daryl), does a hit of cocaine, and is killed in a car accident. In despair, Daryl also feels a strong temptation to return to drugs. He visits Richard, who talks him out of it. Richard also explains he couldn't have saved Charlie as addicts cannot take responsibility for someone else.

A month later, Daryl, confused but hopeful and reborn, accepts his 30 Day Sobriety Coin in front of an audience of fellow AA members.

== Cast ==
- Michael Keaton as Daryl Poynter
- Kathy Baker as Charlie Standers
- Morgan Freeman as Craig
- M. Emmet Walsh as Richard Dirks
- Luca Bercovici as Lenny
- Tate Donovan as Donald
- Claudia Christian as Iris
- Brian Benben as Martin
- Henry Judd Baker as Xavier
- J. David Krassner as Tiller
- Dakin Matthews as Bob
- Ben Piazza as Kramer
- Rachel Ryan as Karen Peluso

== Reception ==
Clean and Sober received generally favorable reviews at the time. Roger Ebert praised the "superb supporting performances" and noted, "Although the subject matter of this film is commonplace in our society... the actual process of surrender and recovery is hardly ever the subject of films, maybe because it seems too depressing." Variety wondered if the film was "perhaps too grim."

In the Los Angeles Times, Sheila Benson wrote:

[The film's] characters, particularly Keaton’s self-destructive Daryl and Kathy Baker’s seductive, wavering fellow addict Charlie, are daringly and consummately played. With anyone as scuzzy as Daryl--and to think of a character his equal you probably have to go back to Sweet Smell of Success--part of the fascination comes from seeing how deep the fault line runs. Caron and Carroll have managed the almost impossible; there is truly no reading Daryl until the last second of the last scene.

On Rotten Tomatoes, the film holds a 61% approval rating based on reviews from 18 critics, with an average score of 5.7/10. Audiences surveyed by CinemaScore gave the film a grade "B+" on scale of A to F.

Then-U.S. President Ronald Reagan viewed this film at Camp David on September 17, 1988, and wrote of it in his diary: "watched a long & not very entertaining movie about a man fighting drugs."

== Awards ==
Michael Keaton won the 1988 National Society of Film Critics Award for Best Actor for his performances in both Clean and Sober and Beetlejuice.
