= The Eddie Capra Mysteries =

- Genre: Mystery
- Starring: Vincent Baggetta; Wendy Phillips; Ken Swofford; Michael Horton
- Composers: John Cacavas; John Addison
- Country of origin: United States
- Original language: English
- No. of seasons: 1
- No. of episodes: 13

Production
- Running time: 60 minutes
- Production company: Universal Television

Original release
- Network: NBC
- Release: September 8, 1978 – January 5, 1979

The Eddie Capra Mysteries is an American mystery television series starring Vincent Baggetta as a lawyer who investigates murders and has a knack for solving them. The series originally aired on NBC from September 8, 1978 to January 12, 1979.

== Cast ==
- Vincent Baggetta as Eddie Capra
- Wendy Phillips as Lacey Brown
- Ken Swofford as J. J. Devlin
- Michael Horton as Harvey Winchell
- Seven Ann McDonald as Jennie Brown

== Synopsis ==
Eddie Capra is a young lawyer who recently graduated from New York University Law School. He works for Devlin, Linkman, and O'Brien, a very prestigious law firm in Los Angeles, California, that specializes in criminal cases. Headstrong and rebellious as he dislikes wearing a tie and usually ignores established legal and police procedures, Eddie tends to rush off and play detective when one of the firm's clients is indicted, seeking evidence to exonerate the client – sometimes to the consternation of his colleagues – before the case ever reaches court. Lacey Brown is his secretary, personal friend, and sometime girlfriend, and Jennie is her precocious daughter. Harvey Winchell, an investigator for the firm, is Eddie's enthusiastic young assistant, while J. J. Devlin, an irascible senior partner in the firm, is Eddie's boss.

Each episode is constructed in the "classic style" of a detective show, opening with a graphic depiction of a puzzling murder and then following Eddie as he interviews witnesses and other people who might not be telling the truth and uncovers clues missed by the authorities one-by-one until they lead to the killer. In the episode's climax, Eddie usually gathers all the suspects in one room – often a courtroom – and uses deductive reasoning to explain which one of them is guilty.

The series employs a gimmick in which viewers – who receive no more or less information than Eddie – are challenged to identify the murderer before Eddie does.

== Production ==
Left to right: Ken Swofford, Vincent Baggetta, Michael Horton, and Wendy Phillips in a promotional cast photo for The Eddie Capra Mysteries.

Peter S. Fischer created The Eddie Capra Mysteries. Episode directors included James Frawley, William Wiard, Edward M. Abroms, and Ivan Dixon. Writers included Fischer and Peter Allan Fields. Fischer and Stuart Cohen were among the show's producers. John Cacavas and John Addison composed music for the show.

Some scripts used in The Eddie Capra Mysteries were adapted from scripts intended for the cancelled 1975–76 NBC series Ellery Queen.

== Broadcast history ==
Premiering on September 8, 1978 with a two-hour pilot episode, The Eddie Capra Mysteries aired on NBC on Fridays at 10:00 p.m. throughout the rest of its run. Its last original episode aired on January 12, 1979. During the summer of 1979, NBC broadcast reruns of the show in its 10:00 p.m. Friday time slot from June to September.

Reruns of The Eddie Capra Mysteries returned to the air in prime time in the summer of 1990, when CBS broadcast episodes of the show at 9:00 p.m. on Thursdays from July 26 to August 30 as a temporary replacement for Wiseguy. In the United Kingdom, the series aired on BBC One in 1980.

== Episodes ==
=== Pilot (1978) ===
Title	Directed by	Written by	Original release date
"Nightmare at Pendragon's Castle"	James Frawley	Peter S. Fischer	September 8, 1978
The two-hour pilot for the series. After the wealthy, powerful, arrogant, obnoxious, and sadistic publisher Charles Pendragon (Robert Vaughn) is killed at his mansion, an actress named Daniella (Janet Margolin) is arrested for his murder. Eddie investigates and finds that Pendragon's associates feared and hated him; he develops a list of suspects made up of Pendragon's dinner guests, all of whom have reasons—past scandals or mistreatment at his hands—to want him dead. Lois Nettleton, Robert J. Hogan, John Considine, Stella Stevens, Gerald S. O'Loughlin, Robert Walker, Jr., and George Hamilton also guest-star.

=== Season 1 (1978–79) ===
No.	Title	Directed by	Written by	Original release date
1	"Where There's Smoke"	Ron Satlof	Peter S. Fischer	September 22, 1978
Eddie volunteers to help clear an equivocating young woman of murder charges resulting from an arson investigation. Patti D'Arbanville, Robin Mattson, Randy Powell, Zitto Kazann, and Wallace Rooney guest-star.
2	"Murder, Murder"	Jim Benson	Peter Allan Fields (teleplay) & Ted Leighton	September 29, 1978
3	"Murder on the Flip Side"	Nicholas Sgarro	Lee Sheldon	October 6, 1978
A young secretary hears a recording-company executive call for help from his office and finds him dead, having both suffered a gunshot wound and taken a drink from a glass of poisoned liquor. She becomes the main witness in the executive's murder, but then comes under suspicion herself when the owner of the record label is found stabbed to death in her bathtub. Eddie sets out to prove her innocence, and his investigation reveals that she could not have killed the record-label owner because that murder occurred while the police were interviewing her; he also discovers that the two murder victims were involved in a feud over a crooked record deal. Vicki Lawrence, Dick Haymes, Mel Carter, Joanna Miles, Andrew Robinson, and Rick Springfield guest-star.
4	"And the Sea Shall Give Up Her Dead"	Unknown	Unknown	October 20, 1978
J.J.'s longtime friend is suspected of killing his political rival, a retired United States Navy admiral turned politician who is found buried in his full dress uniform. Marshall Thompson, Andrew Duggan, Angel Tompkins, and Michael Durrell guest-star.
5	"Dirge for a Dead Dachshund"	Edward Abroms	Peter S. Fischer	October 27, 1978
Eddie's eccentric, elderly Aunt Teresa (Renata Vanni) and her companion believe that someone is trying to kill them. Charlotte Rae, Granville Van Dusen, Joseph Mascolo, Denise Galik, J. P. Finnegan, and Charlene Dallas also guest-star.
6	"How Do I Kill Thee?"	Sigmund Neufeld Jr.	Robert Swanson	November 3, 1978
Eddie seeks evidence to exonerate an aging movie star accused of the murder of a powerful television Hollywood gossip personality. Edie Adams, Anne Francis, Vic Tayback, Barrie Youngfellow, Gene Evans, and Mark Stevens guest-star.
7	"The Intimate Friends of Jenny Wilde"	Ivan Dixon	Peter S. Fischer	November 10, 1978
A famous playwright is suspected of murdering a model. Rip Torn, Veronica Hamel, Dick Gautier, Greg Morris, Carmine Caridi, and Tommy Leonetti guest-star.
8	"Breakout to Murder"	Gordon Hessler	Larry Alexander	December 1, 1978
The sanity of Millie Greer (Caryn Richman), an unstable young woman, rests upon her being absolved of responsibility for the death of an escaped convict in an automobile accident. James Whitmore Jr., Peter Donat, Floyd Levine, Harold Sylvester, Reb Brown, George Deloy, and Carl Anderson also guest-star.
9	"The Two Million Dollar Stowaway"	Edward Abroms	Robert C. Dennis	December 8, 1978
While being arraigned in a Los Angeles courthouse for swindling various people out of over two million dollars, Warren Custer (Bobby Van) escapes custody and boards a cruise ship bound for Mexico, posing as a worker in the ship's engine room and planning to jump overboard and swim to a small boat piloted by a Mexican fortune hunter (Thom Christopher). Also aboard the ship are the United States Marshal he escaped from, many of his swindling victims, and Eddie and his girlfriend. Custer eventually spots the fortune hunter's boat and jumps overboard, but a couple aboard the ship sees him and reports a man overboard. Both the cruise ship and the fortune hunter attempt to rescue Custer; the fortune hunter's partner makes off in the small boat at the first sign of trouble and leaves him struggling in the water as well. After the cruise ship brings Custer and the fortune hunter aboard, Custer is found to have died of multiple stab wounds; it appears either that someone aboard the ship stabbed him just before he jumped or that the fortune hunter stabbed him in the water, and the ship's captain asks Eddie to find the killer. Meanwhile, the fortune hunter reveals that Custer had converted the stolen money to diamonds and had a key to a safety deposit box in Nicaragua, prompting Eddie and various other people on the ship, including multiple suspects in Custer's murder, to look for the key. James McEachin, Gloria DeHaven, Julie Gregg, Patricia Crowley, Guy Stockwell and Ron Masak also guest-star; Masak's appearance in the episode helped get him his long-running role of Sheriff Mort Metzger on Murder, She Wrote. Filmed mostly aboard the Queen Mary in Long Beach, California.
10	"Dying Declaration"	Unknown	Unknown	December 15, 1978
Eddie is upset when a former prostitute who has become a businesswoman asks him to clear her of charges that she murdered a policeman who was his friend. Barbara Rush, Troy Donahue, Héctor Elizondo, Kitty Wynn, Robert Hooks, L. Q. Jones, and Jeff David guest-star.
11	"Murder Plays a Dead Hand"	Unknown	Unknown	December 22, 1978
Eddie investigates the murder of a despised high-stakes poker player who was poisoned during a tournament in Las Vegas. James Coco, Jane Merrow, Neville Brand, Joe Hindy, Louise Sorel, James Luisi, and Ralph Meeker guest-star.
12	"Now You See Her..."	Unknown	Unknown	January 5, 1979
Eddie is upset when a former prostitute who has become a businesswoman asks him to clear her of charges that she murdered a policeman who was his friend. Barbara Rush, Troy Donahue, Héctor Elizondo, Kitty Wynn, Robert Hooks, L. Q. Jones, and Jeff David guest-star.
