= Robert Burr (actor) =

American film, stage and television actor

- Born: Robert Edward Burr; March 5, 1922; Jersey City, New Jersey, U.S.
- Died: May 13, 2000 (aged 78); Los Angeles, California, U.S.
- Occupation: Actor
- Years active: 1947–1995

Robert Edward Burr (March 5, 1922 – May 13, 2000) was an American film, stage and television actor. He was best known for playing Lt. Tom Donnelly in the American soap opera television series Love Is a Many Splendored Thing.

== Life and career ==
Burr was born in Jersey City, New Jersey, and was raised in Leonia, New Jersey. He graduated from Leonia High School. After graduating, he attended Colgate University on a boxing scholarship, and he served as a pilot in the United States Marine Corps during World War II and the Korean War. He was originally a chef. He began his stage career in 1947, appearing in the stage play The Cradle Will Rock. He appeared in such other plays as Who Was That Lady I Saw You With?, The Wall, The Andersonville Trial, Anniversary Waltz, The Lovers, Shot in the Dark and The Royal Hunt of the Sun. In 1964, he understudied for Richard Burton in the Broadway play Hamlet.

Later in his career, Burr made his television debut in the CBS anthology television series Studio One. From 1967 to 1973, he played Lt. Tom Donnelly in the CBS soap opera television series Love Is a Many Splendored Thing. He guest-starred in television programs including Gunsmoke, Naked City, The Edge of Night, Mannix and Ben Casey, and played Luke MacKenzie in the NBC soap opera television series Somerset in 1976. He also appeared in films such as Tattoo, Ghost Story, The Seven-Ups, Out on a Limb and The Possession of Joel Delaney.

Burr retired from acting in 1995, last appearing in the NBC teen sitcom television series California Dreams.

== Death ==
Burr died of emphysema on May 13, 2000, in Los Angeles, California, at the age of 78.
