= Meryl O'Loughlin =

American casting agent

Meryl Abeles O'Loughlin (June 8, 1933 – February 27, 2007) was an American television and film casting agent and casting director.

She was born in Chicago, Illinois, and was Jewish. She held positions as casting supervisor, executive-in-charge of talent, casting consultant, and talent executive. She was nominated twice for a Casting Society of America Award in 1997 & 1999 for The Young and the Restless.

Her son, Chris O'Loughlin, was a member of the 1992 U.S. Olympic team in épée fencing. She was the former wife of actor Gerald S. O'Loughlin.

Meryl O'Loughlin died from ovarian cancer, aged 73, in Santa Monica, California.

== Selected credits ==
- The Outer Limits (as Meryl Abeles)
- The Fugitive
- The Mary Tyler Moore Show
- The Mary Tyler Moore Show
- Sham!
- Mike Hammer: Murder Me, Murder You
- ALF
- Hart to Hart
- Fantasy Island
- Fighting Back: The Story of Rocky Bleier
- Hill Street Blues
- Lucky/Chances
- Alice In Wonderland: Alice Through The Looking Glass
- The White Shadow
- The Bob Newhart Show
- Lou Grant
- WKRP in Cincinnati
- T.J. Hooker
- Tremors II: Aftershocks
- The Young and the Restless
- Taylor's Wall
