= The Granny =

- VHS cover
- Directed by: Luca Bercovici
- Written by: Luca Bercovici; Sam (story)
- Produced by: Sam Bernard; Natan Zahavi
- Starring: Stella Stevens; Shannon Whirry; Sandy Helberg; Brant von Hoffman
- Cinematography: Wally Pfister
- Edited by: Sherwood Jones
- Music by: Kendall Schmidt
- Production companies: United Artists; Tapestry Films
- Distributed by: MGM/UA Distribution Co.
- Release date: August 25, 1995
- Running time: 85 minutes
- Country: United States
- Language: English

The Granny is a 1995 American horror comedy film directed by Luca Bercovici and written by Bercovici and Sam Bernard. The film stars Stella Stevens as a grandmother who comes back from her grave to seek revenge on her greedy family. After a limited release at drive-in theaters, the film was printed directly to VHS video format.

Noted by collectors of modern B-movies for its poor script and amateur acting, The Granny has been called "one of the finer pieces of trash".

== Synopsis ==
The family of a wealthy woman named Anastasia "Granny" Gargoli (Stella Stevens) wants her to die, in order for them to inherit her insurance. Granny is given an eternal life potion by the mysterious preacher Namon Ami (Luca Bercovici). Although the preacher admonishes her not to take it in sunlight, Granny ignores him and drinks it in broad daylight.

She melts into nothing but arises from a grave as a vampire-like monster. Granny starts killing her family to prevent them from inheriting her fortune. It is up to Kelly (Shannon Whirry) and Amy (Samantha Hendricks) to stop the blood hungry, vampire-like granny.

== Cast ==
- Stella Stevens as Granny
- Shannon Whirry as Kelly
- Samantha Hendricks as Amy
- Sandy Helberg as Albert
- Brant von Hoffman as David
- Patricia Sturges as Andrea
- Ryan Bollman as Junior
- Heather Elizabeth Parkhurst as Antoinette
- Joseph Bernard as Mr. Sadler
- Luca Bercovici as Namon Ami

== Production ==
=== Music ===
The film score was composed by noted Hollywood composer Kendall Schmidt (famous for re-scoring Witchfinder General when it was released on VHS). The film also featured the song Hard Feelings by the heavy rock band Blackthorne from their album Afterlife.

== Release ==
=== Rating ===
Initially the film was to be given NC-17, but eventually was rated R for violence and gore, crude sexuality and language.
