= Carol Roux =

American actress

Carol Roux is an American actress who was an original cast member of Another World (appearing from 1964-1968 and again from 1969-1970). She was involved in one of the show's first major storylines. Melissa "Missy" Palmer (Roux) and Bill Matthews (Joseph Gallison) were a young couple in love, but in true soap opera fashion, their road to happiness had numerous hurdles, many the result of the interference of Bill's conniving mother Liz Matthews (Audra Lindley). The two were finally married and the characters left town. But their happiness was short-lived, as Bill was later drowned in a boating accident off screen.

When NBC decided to launch a spin-off of Another World in 1970, the character of Melissa decided to move with her young son to the neighboring town of Somerset. Thus, actress Roux became an original cast member of yet a second soap. She stayed with Somerset for only six months, presumably retiring from acting, as she has not appeared on any other television programs since that time.
