= Edward Power =

American film and television actor (1936–2021)

- Power in 1970
- Born: Edward Everett Power; September 25, 1936; Medford, Massachusetts, U.S.
- Died: December 24, 2021 (aged 85)
- Education: University of New Hampshire; Emory University
- Occupations: Film and television actor

Edward Everett Power (September 25, 1936 – December 24, 2021) was an American film and television actor. He was best known for playing Spencer Garrison in the American soap opera television series Love Is a Many Splendored Thing.

== Life and career ==
Power was born in Medford, Massachusetts, the son of Marion Power. He attended the University of New Hampshire, earning his MA degree in liberal arts. He also attended Emory University, earning his PhD degree. He worked as a sports commentator for WAGA-TV in Atlanta, Georgia, and he taught literature and philosophy at the University of New Hampshire, the Georgia Tech and the University of Colorado. He began his screen career in 1968, playing Spencer Garrison in the CBS soap opera television series Love Is a Many Splendored Thing. In 1973, he appeared in the film The Way We Were.

Later in his career, Power guest-starred in television programs including The Streets of San Francisco, Barnaby Jones, Charlie's Angels, Kojak, Buck Rogers in the 25th Century, Harry O and Lou Grant. He played Harry Shea in the NBC soap opera television series Another World. He also appeared in films such as The Stuff, Empire of the Ants and Disclosure. Aside from acting, he hosted the television game show Guess My Sign.

Power retired from acting in 1996, last appearing in the Fox soap opera television series Melrose Place.

== Death ==
Power died on December 24, 2021, at the age of 85.
