= Rockula =

- Directed by: Luca Bercovici
- Written by: Luca Bercovici; Jefery Levy; Chris Ver Wiel
- Produced by: Jefery Levy
- Starring: Dean Cameron; Toni Basil; Thomas Dolby; Tawny Fere-Ellis; Susan Tyrrell; Bo Diddley
- Cinematography: John Schwartzman
- Edited by: Maureen O'Connell
- Music by: Hilary Bercovici; Osunlade
- Production company: Cannon Films
- Distributed by: Cannon Films
- Release date: February 23, 1990
- Running time: 90 minutes
- Country: United States
- Language: English
- Budget: US$1.5 million

Rockula is a 1990 American comedy-musical film directed by Luca Bercovici and written by Bercovici, Jefery Levy, and Chris Ver Weil. The story centers on a vampire under a curse; the tagline for the film is: "He's a vampire that hasn't scored in 400 years—tonight's the night!". Dean Cameron stars as the vampire Ralph LaVie, Toni Basil plays Phoebe LaVie, Ralph's mother, and Thomas Dolby is the villain Stanley.

Bo Diddley plays a supporting role as Axman, the guitarist in Ralph's band, which is incidentally named Rockula. The director of photography was John Schwartzman, later the DP on Seabiscuit and Saving Mr. Banks.

In the film, Ralph is a vampire who was born in the late 16th century. In the 1680s, Ralph was involved in a romantic relationship with the mortal girl Mona. Mona was killed by a pirate, who happened to be her jealous ex-boyfriend. Mona is reincarnated every 22 years but keeps getting killed by pirates on the anniversary of her original death. Ralph has been romantically involved with each of Mona's incarnations but has been unable to prevent the series of deaths. In the early 1990s, Ralph courts a young singer, who happens to be Mona's latest incarnation. He seeks a way to end the curse, while starting his own musical career in an attempt to work alongside his love interest.

== Plot ==
Ralph Lavie is a vampire who, at 400 years old, still resides with his mother Phoebe and is a virgin. In 1682, he met Mona, but tragedy struck when she was murdered by her jealous boyfriend, a pirate with a rhinestone pegleg, with a giant hambone. Since that fateful day, Mona has been reincarnated every twenty-two years, only to fall in love with Ralph once more, on Friday the 13th in October, and killed on Halloween by a pirate wielding a giant hambone. Now, in 1990, Ralph has grown weary of this endless cycle. Determined to break the pattern, he vows to remain locked in his room and avoid meeting Mona until after Halloween passes, much to the frustration of his sentient and lustful reflection.

Walking out into the street, he is struck by a car driven by Mona's latest incarnation—a local singer. Immediately warning her to stay away from him, Ralph flees, but a portentous dream reinvigorates his determination to save her life now that events have been set in motion. He discovers her performing at a local club and they connect instantly, much to the dismay of Mona's manager and ex-boyfriend Stanley, an eccentric mortuary owner.

Ralph claims he's in a band and, thanks to decades of musical lessons, he and his bar friends form the band Rockula, leveraging his vampire persona as a unique gimmick. Their debut performance is a success, and the band quickly gains popularity. Ralph and Mona begin dating and start collaborating musically. Stanley, seeing this as a threat, consults a local psychic, Madame Ben-Wa, who confirms Ralph's vampire identity. Determined to eliminate Ralph and preserve Mona forever, Stanley devises a plan to kill Ralph and cryogenically freeze Mona.

Ralph and Mona have dinner with Phoebe, who engages in discussions about her affairs with historic figures and gives an impromptu musical performance by Phoebe. On the drive home, Ralph, unwilling to let Mona think he and his mother are delusional, confesses he is a vampire and explains the curse. Mona remains skeptical until Ralph partially transforms into a bat. Disturbed, she drives away and plans to leave town. Rockula is set to perform on Halloween night and Mona, realizing she loves Ralph, returns and meets him on stage, only to be kidnapped by Stanley.

Ralph's reflection reveals Mona's location where Stanley and Ralph duel. Madame Ben-Wa is revealed to be Phoebe, who has orchestrated the curse for years, fearing Ralph would leave her. Realizing she must let him grow, she apologizes but is knocked unconscious by Stanley. As Ralph once again half-transforms into a bat, Stanley is terrified and falls into his own freezing chamber. With the curse broken, Ralph and Mona leave together, happily. Ralph's reflection smashes his way out of the mirror, dressed in an Elvis rhinestone jumpsuit, and performs a final number as Rockula with all the band members.

== Production ==
Principal filming for Rockula was actually completed in 1988. At the time, both New World and Cannon Pictures were filing for bankruptcy. Consequently, several of the films the two companies made, which were ready for release, got shelved. The films made by New World eventually found decent distribution and their film Warlock actually wound up being a huge hit on home video. Cannon's Rockula however, only played a few theatres before being dumped on video in August 1990, where it remained largely ignored.

== Cast ==
- Dean Cameron as Ralph Lavie / Ralph's Reflection
- Toni Basil as Phoebe Lavie
- Thomas Dolby as Stanley
- Tawny Fere as Mona
- Susan Tyrell as Chuck, The Bartender
- Bo Diddley as Axman
- Kevin Hunter as Drunk
- Nancye Ferguson as Robin
- Rick Zumwalt as "Boom-Boom"
- Tony Cox as Al "Big Al"
- Greg Rusin as Elmo
- Bill Brochtrup as Roadie

== See also ==
- Vampire film
