= James Di Pasquale =

American classical composer

James Di Pasquale (born April 7, 1941) is an American musician and composer of contemporary classical music and music for television and films.

== Biography ==
Pasquale was born on April 7, 1941, in Chicago to Hugo and Lucille (née Ciccone) Di Pasquale, James Di Pasquale is a graduate of St. Mel's High School in Chicago. He graduated from Northwestern University and the Manhattan School of Music. His teachers included David Diamond and Ludmila Uhlela.

Before turning full-time to composition, he had a varied career as a woodwinds performer with the Chicago Symphony Orchestra, the Bolshoi Ballet, and the Royal Ballet.

He performed as a jazz musician with Gerry Mulligan, Ella Fitzgerald, Henry Mancini, and Barbra Streisand as well as many others. He was one of the original members of the Paul Winter Consort.

In 1984, he served as the Organizing Chairman and first President of the Society of Composers and Lyricists. He also served as a member of the Board of Governors of the Academy of Television Arts & Sciences and on the Writer's Advisory Committee at the American Society of Composers, Authors, and Publishers (ASCAP).

== Music for television ==
He wrote the musical scores to made-for-TV movies such as: Sarah T. – Portrait of a Teenage Alcoholic (1975), Fantasies (1982), Two of a Kind (1982), Quarterback Princess (1983), The Shell Seekers (1989), The Killing Mind (1991), Runaway Father (1991), In the Best Interest of the Children (1992), Seduction: Three Tales from the "Inner Sanctum" (1992); and television series such as: Columbo, Lou Grant, Switch, Hawaii Five-O, McClain's Law, Chicago Story, Cutter to Houston and Trauma Center.

He has received three Emmy Awards, six Emmy nominations, and a CableACE Award nomination for his work in television.

== Music for films ==
His motion picture scores include Fast Break (1979) and Rad (1986).

== Classical works ==
His compositions for the concert hall include:

- Sonata for tenor saxophone and piano
- Quartet for trumpet, tenor saxophone, viola, and cello
- Symphony in one movement
- In Absentia: Elegy for Stan Getz
- Monologia for solo horn (for Dale Clevenger, principal horn of the Chicago Symphony Orchestra)
- Interplay and Showing Great Restraint (for Chicago Current, a jazz–fusion ensemble of Chicago Symphony players.)

== Recordings ==
He has also worked as a record producer. His credits include:

- With You, I'm Born Again (Billy Preston and Syreeta), a top five single
- Glider (Auracle), a top ten jazz album

His "Sonata for Tenor Saxophone and Piano" has been recorded by saxophonists such as James Houlik, Frederick Hemke and Steven Mauk, a saxophone instructor at Ithaca College in Ithaca, NY.

== Personal life ==
He married Donna McNeely in 1995. They were divorced in 2003. One son, Marco James Di Pasquale, was born in 1998.
