= Chris O'Loughlin (fencer) =

American Olympic fencer

Personal information
- Nickname: Chris
- Born: Christopher Stuart O'Loughlin; December 13, 1967 (age 58) Los Angeles, California, United States
- Height: 6 ft 0 in (183 cm)
- Weight: 165 lb (75 kg)

Fencing career
- Sport: Fencing
- Country: United States
- Club: New York Athletic Club
Medal record
Representing United States
Pan American Games
Bronze medal – third place	1991 Havana	Team épée

Christopher Stuart O'Loughlin (born December 13, 1967) is an American Olympic épée fencer.

== Early life ==
O'Loughlin was born in Los Angeles, California. His father was actor Gerald S. O'Loughlin, known for the 1970s ABC television drama police procedural series The Rookies. His mother, Meryl Abeles O'Loughlin was vice president of casting for Columbia Pictures Television. He grew up in Van Nuys, California. His mother was Jewish and his father was Irish-American.

While he initially had an interest in pursuing acting, O'Loughlin noted: "One of the things that I really like about fencing is that you get out of it what you put into it. That's not true with acting."

He was introduced to fencing as a youth when he attended the Oakwood School in North Hollywood, California, which offered fencing as a sport. In 1985, he became the youngest senior US Championship men's épée finalist until that time. He graduated from high school in 1985.

He enrolled in the University of Pennsylvania in 1986, graduating in 1989 with a degree in urban studies. There, he was a member of St. Anthony Hall and the Penn Quakers fencing team.

O'Loughlin earned a master's degree from Columbia University.

== Fencing career ==
While a freshman member of the University of Pennsylvania Quakers fencing team, O'Loughlin won the National Collegiate Athletic Association (NCAA) Championship in épée in 1986. He was also a four-time All-American and All-Ivy League from 1986 to 1989. He also won the Intercollegiate Fencing Association (IFA) Eastern Championship in 1986. In 1986 he received Penn's Peter K. Riley Award, as the outstanding freshman athlete. He was captain of Penn's fencing team in his junior and senior seasons.

While attending the University of Pennsylvania he was the Junior US National Championship, serving on the Junior National Team in 1986 and 1987. O'Loughlin won a silver individual medal and a bronze team medal in épée at the 1989 Maccabiah Games. He was a member of the World University Games team in 1987, 1989, 1991, 1993, and 1995.

He served on the Senior World Championship Team in 1990, 1991, and 1995. He won a bronze medal with the United States épée team at the 1991 Pan American Games.

O'Loughlin competed on behalf of the United States in the individual épée event at the 1992 Summer Olympics in Barcelona and was the first alternate for the 1996 Summer Olympics in Atlanta. In 2000, O'Loughlin won the U.S. National Championship in individual épée.

In 2012, he began competing at the Veteran level. That year, he won the silver medal in the North American Cup–Veteran Level, also winning the silver medal in 2016. At the April 2017 North American Cup, he won the gold medal in the Veteran 50 to 59 category and won a silver medal in the Veteran Open category. In 2018, he placed ninth in the USA Fencing National Championships, veteran age 50 to 59 category. That same year, he helped team USA win a gold medal at the 2018 Veteran World Championships in Livorno, Italy. O'Loughlin said, “I’ve been fencing for a really long time,” O’Loughlin says. “I’ve won a lot of national tournaments and done well internationally. But I never had the luck or good fortune to stand on the podium while they play the national anthem and raise the American flag. I honestly did not think it would affect me. But I was touched. I was really, really touched.” He also places seventh overall at the Veteran World Championships. His coaches are Alex Abend & Jim Carpenter.

He is a member of the New York Athletic Club team, becoming national champions six times. He was chairman of the NYAC fencing. He was also the United States athlete representative to the Fencing Association.

=== Competitions ===
Date	Place	Event	Competition	Team	Reference
2024	Gold	Veteran 50-59 épée	USA Fencing National Championships		
2022	Silver	Veteran 50-59 épée	March North American Cup		
2022	Ninth	Veteran épée	March North American Cup		
2022	Gold	Veteran 50-59 épée	January North American Cup		
2021	Gold	Veteran 50-59 épée	Veteran National Championship / Veteran Open North American Cup		
2021	Gold	Veteran 50-59 épée	USA Fencing National Championships		
2018	Gold	Team épée	Veteran World Championship	Team USA	
2018	Seventh	50-59 épée	Veteran World Championship	Team USA	
2018	Bronze	Veteran 50-59 épée	April North American Cup		
2018	Bronze	Veteran Open épée	April North American Cup		
2018	Ninth	Veteran 50-59 épée	USA Fencing National Championships		
2017	Gold	Veteran 50–59	April North American Cup		
2017	Silver	Veteran Open	April North American Cup		
2017	Bronze	Veteran 50–59	December North American Cup		
2016	Silver	Veteran Open	April North American Cup		
2016	Ninth	Veteran 40-49 épée	USA Fencing National Championships		
2012	Silver	Veteran Team	July North American Cup		
2002	Gold	Division I Team	USA Fencing National Championships		
2001	Gold	Division I Team	USA Fencing National Championships		
2000	Gold	Division I Individual épée	USA Fencing National Championships		
2000	Gold	Division I Team	US Fencing National Championships		
1998	Gold	Division I Team	USA Fencing National Championships		
1997	Gold	Division I Team	USA Fencing National Championships		
1996	Gold	Division I	North American Cup B		
1996	Gold	Division I	North American Cup C		
1996	Gold	Division I Team	USA Fencing National Championships		
1996	20th		Poitiers World Cup		
1996	26th		Paris World Cup		
1996	32nd		London World Cup		
1995	Gold	Division I Team	US Fencing National Championships		
1995	13th	Team	Senior World Championships		
1995	47th	Individual	Senior World Championships		
1992	23rd		Legnano World Cup		
1992	55th	Individual épée	1992 Summer Olympics	Team USA	
1992	11th	Division I épée	USA Fencing National Championships		
1991	Gold	Individual épée	United States Olympic Festival		
1991	Gold	Team épée	United States Olympic Festival		
1991	Bronze	Team épée	Pan American Games	Team USA	
1991	7th	Division I épée	USA Fencing National Championships		
1990	4th	Division I épée	USA Fencing National Championships		
1990	19th	Team	Senior World Championships		
1989	Gold	Individual épée	United States Olympic Festival		
1989	Gold	Team épée	United States Olympic Festival		
1989	5th	Division I épée	USA Fencing National Championships		
1989	18th	Individual	World University Games		
1989	Bronze	Individual épée	NCAA Championships		
1989	Silver	Individual épée	Maccabiah Games		
1989	Bronze	Team épée	Maccabiah Games		
1988	5th	Individual épée	NCAA Championships		
1987	Silver	Individual épée	NCAA Championships		
1987	44th		Junior World Championships	Team USA	
1986	6th	Division I épée	USA Fencing National Championships		
1986	Gold	Individual épée	NCAA Championships		
1986	13th		Junior Pan American Championships	Team USA	
1986	34th		Junior World Championships	Team USA	
1985	6th	Division I épée	USA Fencing National Championships		
1986	Gold	Under 19 épée	USA Fencing National Championships		
1985	Silver	Under 19 épée	USA Fencing National Championships		

== Honors ==
- US Fencing Hall of Fame.
- University of Pennsylvania Hall of Fame.
- Philadelphia Jewish Sports Hall of Fame, 2019.
- NCAA All-American in 1986, 1987, 1988, and 1989.

== Professional and personal life ==
In 1990, O'Loughlin worked with NYNEX, later Verizon, as part of the U.S.O.C. Olympic Job Opportunity Program. Since then, he has held several executive positions in the telecommunications infrastructure and software industry. He is currently a Partner at IBM.

O’Loughlin married Colleen Clinton. The couple originally lived in New York City, but now lives in Jersey City, New Jersey. They have one son.

He is a Little League Baseball coach.

== See also ==
- List of USFA Division I National Champions
- List of NCAA fencing champions
- List of USFA Hall of Fame members
