= Somerset (TV series) =

American TV series (1970–1976)

- Somerset opening titles from 1971-1974
- Genre: Soap opera; Drama
- Created by: Robert Cenedella
- Country of origin: United States
- Original language: English
- No. of seasons: 6
- No. of episodes: 1,710

Production
- Running time: 30 minutes
- Production company: Procter & Gamble Productions

Original release
- Network: NBC
- Release: March 30, 1970 – December 31, 1976

Somerset (sometimes called Another World in Somerset or Another World: Somerset) is an American television soap opera that ran on NBC from March 30, 1970, until December 31, 1976. The show was a spin-off of another NBC serial, Another World. The show was created by Robert Cenedella and produced by Lyle B. Hill.

== Overview ==
Initially, the show revolved around Melissa "Missy" Palmer Matthews (Carol Roux), Lahoma Vane Lucas (Ann Wedgeworth) and Sam Lucas (Jordan Charney) and Missy's young son Ricky Matthews. These were popular characters who were first seen on Another World. They moved to the fictional town of Somerset, not far from the fictional Bay City of Another World, which was supposed to be near Chicago, Illinois.

The first stories on the serial revolved around the trio's progress in starting new friendships and romantic entanglements. In Somerset, the other families of importance were the Davis family, the Buchanans, the Grants and the Delaneys, who ran Somerset's major employer, Delaney Brands. Within six months, Missy was gone and new characters had been added, including a new family, the Kurtzes, and several female characters to act as love interests for Dr. Stan Kurtz and Peter Delaney.

In early 1971, the show changed writers, with Robert Cenedella leaving the show in favor of famed mystery writer Henry Slesar.

Further, Somerset slowly moved away from the traditional soap opera format, and started telling stories that dealt heavily with the Mafia and other types of crime, not unlike CBS's The Edge of Night which Slesar also wrote. After the departure of Slesar, several other writers attempted to bring the show's ratings up with varying mixtures of the two previous formats, each of them slowly removing nearly all of the original characters. One of them, Roy Winsor, was the creator of Search for Tomorrow, Love of Life, and The Secret Storm.

The premiere cast included Jason Bernard (as Ricky Matthews), Douglas Chapin (as Tony Cooper), Ralph Clanton (as Jasper Delaney), Nicolas Coster (as Robert Delaney), Len Gochman (as Peter Delaney), Alice Hirson (as Ellen Matthews), Georgann Johnson (as Ellen Bishop Grant),Ed Kemmer (as attorney Dick Grant), Susan MacDonnell (as Jill Grant Farmer), Ron Martin (as David Grant), Wynne Miller (as singer Sandy Buchanan Delaney), Gary Sandy (as Randy Buchanan), Fred J. Scollay (as Harry Wilson aka Ike Harding) Dorothy Stinnette (as Laura Delaney Cooper), Paul Sparer (as Rex Cooper), Philip Sterling (as Rafe Carter), Pamela Toll (as Pammy Davis) and Marie Wallace (as India Bishop Delaney).

The Somerset County Courthouse in Somerville, New Jersey, was used for exteriors.

== Broadcast history ==
NBC and packager Procter & Gamble Productions first launched Somerset as an extension of the mother show, adding the locales to each program's title. They titled the parent program Another World in Bay City and the new spinoff Another World in Somerset, in the hope that the large loyal following of the mother show, which aired an hour earlier than Somerset at 3:00 p.m./2 Central, would stay tuned for several of their favorite characters to appear in a new storyline. By March 1971, NBC shortened the title to simply Somerset and reverted Another World to its original title, separating the two shows' identities and eventually phasing out the crossover characters by February 1972. Roux and Wedgeworth did not return to Another World; Charney returned to the mother program in July 1973.

Airing in a time slot prone to affiliate pre-exemption (4:00/3:00 Central) caused Somerset to struggle throughout the whole of its 6¾-year history to gain a foothold in the daytime pantheon. ABC's Dark Shadows held the ratings and clearances lead at the time Somerset went on the air, but the unpopular "Leviathan" and "Parallel Time" storylines coincided with the premiere of Somerset. This enabled NBC's new show to push the ratings of Dark Shadows down considerably, and Somerset achieved promising ratings during its first year. Dark Shadows had achieved a rating of 7.3 during the 1969–1970 season, but by the end of the 1970–1971 season, Somerset had a rating of 7.0 and Dark Shadows a rating of 5.3. A successful revival of the game show Password entered ABC's schedule at that slot during the 1970–71 season, and its ratings success cut into the Somerset audience. Ratings did improve somewhat during the Slesar period (CBS' The Secret Storm ended a long run against Somerset), but after the end of a successful murder storyline in late 1971, the show's ratings began to stagnate or decline.

By 1974, the other networks had plugged in surprisingly strong game shows (CBS' Tattletales and ABC's The $10,000 Pyramid) at 4:00 p.m. As a result, numerous affiliates began preempting the program in favor of cartoons, syndicated programming (including game shows, sitcom reruns, variety shows or talk shows), old movies, and sometimes locally produced content. Perhaps the nail in Somerset's coffin came when ABC acquired The Edge of Night from CBS in December 1975 due to CBS' expansion of As the World Turns to an hour in length, itself a response of sorts to NBC eleven months earlier expanding Another World to a full hour and its NBC sister soap Days of Our Lives likewise three months later, with both expansions being successful. ABC placed The Edge of Night against Somerset in the 4:00 p.m. time slot. Although Somerset's ratings had improved during its final year, under the guidance of new head writer Robert J. Shaw, they were ultimately not enough to save the program from cancellation. NBC announced the cancellation of the program in the fall of 1976, and the show aired for the 1,710th and final time on New Year's Eve. Somerset's place on the NBC daytime schedule was given to The Gong Show, which became a popular-culture phenomenon eventually. The latter series' timeslot, 12:30 p.m. (11:30 a.m. Central), was given to a new Procter and Gamble-packaged soap, Lovers and Friends which would later be retooled into For Richer, For Poorer. Both shows fared worse in the ratings than Somerset.

Somerset, along with ABC's The Best of Everything and A World Apart, marked the last time that multiple American network daytime serials premiered on the same date. Neither of the ABC shows lasted past 1971.

After the final episode aired on December 31, 1976, announcer Bill Woolf read the following message:

With today's episode, Somerset concludes its run on the air. We want to thank all of our viewers for their loyalty these past 6½ years, and wish you all a very Happy New Year.

== Cast ==
More than 150 actors appeared on Somerset over its near-seven-year run.

Other performers in the cast include:

- Michael Lipton: Dr. Stan Kurtz (1970–76)
- Humbert Allen Astredo: Joe Bruno (1970)
- Bibi Besch: Eve Lawrence (1973–76)
- Gene Bua: Steve Slade (1976)
- Robert Burr: Luke MacKenzie (1976)
- Joel Crothers: Julian Cannell (1972–76)
- Ted Danson: Tom Conway (1974–76)
- Veleka Gray: Victoria Paisley (1975–76)
- Harriet Hall: Andrea Moore (1972–74)
- Barry Jenner: Tony Cooper #2 (1974–76)
- Lois Kibbee: Emily Moore Matson (1972–73)
- Audrey Landers: Heather Lawrence (1974–76)
- Michael Nouri: Tom Conway (1976)
- James O'Sullivan: Dr. Jerry Kane (1974–76)
- Jameson Parker: Dale Robinson (1976)
- Christopher Pennock: Dana Moore (1972–73)
- Jane Rose: Becky Winkle (1974–75)
- Frank Schofield: Philip Matson (1972–73)
- Richard Shoberg: Mitch Farmer (1971–72)
- Tina Sloan: Kate Cannell (1974–76)
- Lois Smith: Zoe Cannell (1972–73)
- Sigourney Weaver: Avis Ryan (1976)
- JoBeth Williams: Carrie Wheeler (1975–76)
- Meg Wittner: Ginger Kurtz Cooper (1972)
- Fred J.Scolley: Harry Wilson (aka Ike Harding) (1970–71)
