= The Chain (1996 film) =

- Directed by: Luca Bercovici
- Written by: Luca Bercovici; Sam Bernard; Jefery Levy
- Starring: Luca Bercovici; Gary Busey
- Cinematography: Steven Wacks
- Edited by: Sherwood Jones
- Music by: Kendall Schmidt
- Distributed by: Columbia Tristar
- Release date: May 17, 1996
- Running time: 96 minutes
- Country: United States
- Language: English

The Chain is a 1996 American action film directed by Luca Bercovici for Columbia Tristar and starring Gary Busey.

== Plot ==
When unjustly imprisoned in a South American jail, a tough cop and a renegade arms dealer must set aside their differences to escape.
