= Veleka Gray =

American actress

- Gray in 1980
- Born: March 22, 1943 (age 83); New Orleans, Louisiana, U.S.
- Occupation: Actress
- Years active: 1970–1984

Veleka Gray (born March 22, 1951), sometimes credited as Velekka Gray, is an American actress, best known for her roles as department store executive Vicki Paisley Cannell on Somerset, and as Mia Marriott on Love of Life from 1977 to 1980.

== Life and career ==
Gray was born and raised in New Orleans, Louisiana.

In 1970, she landed her first soap role, replacing Donna Mills in the role of Laura Donnelly Elliott on Love is a Many Splendored Thing. In 1974 she was cast as vixen Susan Pritchett on How To Survive A Marriage. Veleka played the role of Mae on the Mod Squad episode “Welcome to the Human Race, Levi Frazee!”

In 1975, Gray joined the cast of Somerset as Victoria Paisley. Her screen partner in that role was Joel Crothers, who played Julian Cannell. Gray and Crothers were engaged to be married when he died in 1985.

In 1977, she was cast in the role of Mia Marriott on Love of Life. In April 1980, she originated the role of nurse Lyla Montgomery on As the World Turns.

In February 1983, Gray appeared on The Young and the Restless as sassy hotel manicurist Ruby Collins. Two months later, in April, she began a contract role as a different character in the same series, Dr. Sharon Reaves, Patty Williams' demure and earnest psychiatrist. This dual role made her the only actor in soap history to play two roles simultaneously on the same series that were neither related nor lookalikes.

In the early 1980s, Gray was a frequent cast member of the "CBS Radio Mystery Theater" for Himan Brown.

Gray has taught acting, speech and business classes and worked with prisoners on public speaking skills.

Her recent work includes commercials and voice work.

== Filmography ==
Film
Year	Film	Role	Notes
1970	I Love My Wife	The Stewardess	
2009	Godmother	The Godmother	
2009	Flood Streets	Eleanor Cameron	
2009	Flag of my Father	Dr. Souza	
Television
Year	Title	Role	Notes
1970	The Mod Squad	Mae Colly	1 episode
1970–1972	Love is a Many Splendored Thing (TV series)	Laura Donnelly Elliott #2	
1974	How to Survive a Marriage	Susan Pritchett	
1975–1976	Somerset	Victoria "Vicki" Paisley	
1977–1980	Love of Life	Mia Marriott	
1980	As the World Turns	Lyla Montgomery, R. N. #1	
1983	The Young and the Restless	Ruby Collins / Dr. Sharon Reaves	
