= Eric Bercovici =

American film producer

- Born: February 27, 1933; New York City, United States
- Died: February 9, 2014 (aged 80); Kaneohe, Hawaii, United States
- Occupation(s): TV and film producer, screenwriter
- Known for: Shōgun
- Spouses: Sylvia; Karen Berger; Chiho Adachi (m. 1980–2014)
- Children: Three

Eric Bercovici (February 27, 1933 – February 9, 2014) was an American television and film producer and screenwriter. He was best known for producing and adapting the screenplay for the 1980 television miniseries Shōgun.

Born in New York City to screenwriter Leonardo Bercovici and Frances Ellis Fleischman, he studied theater at Yale University. His career had barely begun when his father was blacklisted in 1951 through the late 1950s. Eric Bercovici then went to Europe to work on films, returning to the U.S. in 1965. He then began writing episodes of The Man from U.N.C.L.E., I Spy, and The Danny Thomas Hour. He wrote the screenplays for the 1968 films Hell in the Pacific and Day of the Evil Gun. In the 1970s, he wrote episodes for Hawaii Five-O and created the series Assignment Vienna and its pilot Assignment: Munich. In 1977, he adapted John Ehrlichman's novel The Company into a miniseries titled Washington: Behind Closed Doors.

In 1980, Bercovici adapted James Clavell's 1975 novel Shōgun about an English seaman marooned in 17th century Japan into a nine-hour miniseries of the same name. He was also a producer of the series. Shōgun won three of its 14 Emmy nominations, including Outstanding Miniseries, and all three of its Golden Globe nominations, including Best TV Series – Drama. At the time, it was also one of the highest-rated miniseries in television history, second only to Roots.

Bercovici would finish out the 1980s and his writing/producing career as the creator, writer and executive producer for the 1981–82 James Arness vehicle McClain's Law (including its two-hour pilot film) as well as the 1982 ensemble drama Chicago Story, but neither series lasted longer than 14 episodes. His novel So Little Cause for Caroline was adapted into the 1982 made-for-TV film One Shoe Makes It Murder and he wrote at least one episode of Lindsay Wagner's 1984 police drama Jessie. In 1986–87 he was one of the screenwriters for the films The Fifth Missile and Farewell Moscow. His final project was as writer and producer of Noble House, based on another Clavell novel. When not writing screenplays, Bercovici wrote crime novels.

== Personal life ==
Eric Bercovici was the son of screenwriter Leonardo Bercovici (1908 –1995) and Frances Ellis Fleischman (1910 - 1951).Through his grandfather Joseph, he was also the great-nephew of Konrad Bercovici.

In February 2014, Eric Bercovici died of a heart attack at his home in Kaneohe, Hawaii 18 days before his 81st birthday. He was survived by his wife, Chiho Adachi, whom he met while making Shōgun, and three sons from previous marriages, musician/composer/producer Jacob Bercovici, producer/engineer Hilary Bercovici and writer/actor/director Luca Bercovici. He was formerly married to Sylvia, and actress Karen Berger.
