= Geoff Dougherty =

American journalist

Geoffrey Dougherty
- Education: Johns Hopkins Bloomberg School of Public Health
- Occupation: Journalist
- Known for: Founding the Chi-Town Daily News and Chicago Current, computer-assisted/quantitative journalism, journalist for U.S. News & World Report

Geoff Dougherty is a Chicago journalist noted for founding two local news organizations, and for his work as a computer-assisted/quantitative journalist.

== Career ==
=== Chi-Town Daily News ===
In 2005, Dougherty founded the nonprofit Chicago Daily News, an online-only news organization devoted to hyperlocal coverage of Chicago neighborhoods. The name echoed that of the Chicago Daily News, a newspaper which had folded in 1978 and had been held in high regard by him. He even used Craigslist to advertise for writers. The organization shortly changed its name to Chi-Town Daily News. In 2007, it received $340,000 in funding from the John S. and James L. Knight Foundation to build a network of trained citizen journalists to cover their Chicago neighborhoods.

The news organization won national attention for its business model and journalism, including coverage in The Washington Post. and Boston Globe. Chi-Town Daily News attracted some criticism from traditional journalists, who argued that citizen journalism would encourage news organizations to lay off full-time, professional reporters in favor of unpaid volunteers incapable of producing high-caliber journalism. Chi-Town Daily News closed in September 2009, citing a lack of available philanthropic funds to continue operations.

=== Chicago Current ===
In 2010, Dougherty and a group of former Chi-Town Daily News reporters launched Chicago Current, an insider political paper modeled after Politico.

=== Computer-Assisted Reporting ===
Before launching the two online newspapers, Dougherty was the computer-assisted reporting editor at the Chicago Tribune, where he undertook investigations on coal mining and food safety.

Earlier, he served as computer-assisted reporting editor at the Miami Herald, where he played a key role in the paper's investigation into the flawed presidential election of 2000, and the subsequent effort to examine and analyze all of the discarded ballots in Florida.

=== U.S. News & World Report ===
Dougherty is now a journalist for U.S. News & World Report, performing quantitative analysis on health care-related topics. In 2015, he and Steve Sternberg reported on increased procedural complication rates for surgeries at low-volume hospitals. This led Johns Hopkins Medical Institutions, Dartmouth-Hitchcock Medical Center, and the University of Michigan Health System to impose policies of minimum volume for certain procedures.

== Education ==
Dougherty received his MPH from the Johns Hopkins Bloomberg School of Public Health, where is currently a PhD candidate. He has received a student award from The Mary B. Meyer Memorial Fund.
