= Vincent Baggetta =

American actor (1937–2017)

- Baggetta The Eddie Capra Mysteries, 1978
- Born: December 7, 1937; Paterson, New Jersey, U.S.
- Died: May 2, 2017 (aged 79); Sherman Oaks, California, U.S.
- Occupation: Actor
- Years active: 1962–1995

Vincent Baggetta (also billed as Vince Baggetta, Vincent Beggetta, or Vince Bagetta) (December 7, 1937 – May 2, 2017) was an American television actor.

== Biography ==
Baggetta was born in Paterson, New Jersey. He is best known for his starring role in The Eddie Capra Mysteries, playing the title character for the 13-episode run of the series in 1978–1979.

Baggetta drove a taxi while he sought success as an actor. His career started with bit parts in The Defenders and Naked City in 1962 and The Twilight Zone in 1963. He also did a guest spot as himself on The Hollywood Squares in 1966.

He made appearances in several popular TV shows in the 1970s, including Mannix, Cannon, Starsky & Hutch, The Love Boat, Kojak, Switch, and Eischied.

He appeared as different characters in two episodes of The Rockford Files. He appeared in seven episodes of Mary Hartman, Mary Hartman as Father Frank DeMarco. Baggetta played Lou Pellegrino in the short-lived TV series Chicago Story in 1982. He also portrayed Rick Scotti in the series Jack and Mike in 1987. During the 1980s, he appeared on Charlie's Angels; Vega$; Remington Steele; Fame; Magnum, P.I.; T.J Hooker; and Lou Grant. He made two appearances (in different roles) on Murder, She Wrote, three appearances (two different roles) in Hill Street Blues, and seven as Assistant District Attorney John Moretti in The Colbys.

Baggetta started the 1990s as Father Jarvis in two episodes of Freddy's Nightmares, a TV spinoff of the A Nightmare on Elm Street film series. He made a third appearance on Murder, She Wrote and had a guest role on NYPD Blue. He also had an uncredited 1995 appearance in the television series Renegade. He played the leading role of David Renaldi on One Life to Live in 1984.

On May 2, 2017, Baggetta died in Sherman Oaks, California, aged 79.

== Selected filmography ==
Year	Title	Role	Notes
1965	Gendarme in New York	Italian	Uncredited
1976	Embryo	Collier	
1976	Two-Minute Warning	Ted Shelley	
1983	The Man Who Wasn't There	Riley	
1987	Hawaiian Dream	Rudy Moran	As "Vincent Bagetta"
