= Chicago Story =

American crime drama television series

- Genre: Crime drama
- Created by: Eric Bercovici
- Written by: David Assael; Eric Bercovici; Dennis Capps; Rob Gilmer; Lee H. Katzin; David Michael Jacobs; Arthur E. Kean; Michael O'Hara; Robert Schlitt
- Directed by: Corey Allen; Michael Caffey; Lee H. Katzin; Arthur E. Kean; Bruce Kessler; Harvey S. Laidman; Christian I. Nyby II; David Paulsen; Bob Thompson; Jerry Thorpe
- Starring: Maud Adams; Vincent Baggetta; Dennis Franz; John Mahoney; Craig T. Nelson; Daniel Hugh Kelly
- Composers: John Beal; James Di Pasquale; Dick Halligan; Stu Phillips
- Country of origin: United States
- Original language: English
- No. of seasons: 1
- No. of episodes: 13 + TV movie pilot

Production
- Executive producer: Eric Bercovici
- Producer: John Cutts
- Running time: 90 minutes
- Production companies: Eric Bercovici Productions; MGM Television

Original release
- Network: NBC
- Release: March 6 – June 11, 1982

Chicago Story is an American crime drama television series that aired for 13 episodes on NBC from March 6 to June 11, 1982, following a two-hour television film pilot that was broadcast earlier on March 15, 1981.

== Synopsis ==
The series followed the work and lives of several Chicago lawyers, police officers, and doctors. The series was similar to Hill Street Blues in that it was less about action scenes and more about the stresses of working in law enforcement and medicine. The show did not catch on with viewers and lasted only thirteen episodes.

The cast included Maud Adams and Kristoffer Tabori as Dr. Judith Bergstrom and Dr. Max Carson, doctors at Cook County Hospital; Craig T. Nelson, Vincent Baggetta and Molly Cheek as attorneys Kenneth A. Dutton, Lou Pellegrino and Megan Powers. Dutton was a prosecutor and Pellegrino was a defense attorney; Powers was a lawyer both men were interested in; and Dennis Franz, Richard Lawson and Daniel Hugh Kelly appeared as police officers Joe Gilland, O.Z. Tate and Frank Wajorski, respectively. Gilland was a beat cop, while Tate and Wajorski were detectives.

Intermixed within, especially during the opening title sequence, was plenty of Chicago scenery, including the John Hancock Center; Merchandise Mart; Michigan Avenue; Wrigley Building; Willis Tower (then known as Sears Tower); Aon Center (then known as the Standard Oil Building); the Chicago Theater and its famous marquee; Lake Shore Drive; the then-headquarters of the Chicago Sun-Times; the Chicago Water Tower; Marina City; the Chicago 'L', and various other sights. One of the settings was the then–Cook County Hospital.

Chicago Story was notable for ninety-minute-long episodes, which had not been attempted on network prime-time TV since The Virginian left the air in 1971. The show was pared down to an hour late in its run, including broadcasting edited versions of episodes that had already aired. By focusing on the Windy City, it presaged the Chicago franchise (including Chicago Fire, Chicago P.D. and Chicago Med) some thirty years later, also on NBC.

Episodes were later rebroadcast on TNT in 1994.

The series aired in the United Kingdom on BBC1 in 1982.

== Cast ==
- Maud Adams as Dr. Judith Bergstrom
- Vincent Baggetta as Lou Pellegrino
- Molly Cheek as Megan Powers
- Dennis Franz as Officer Joe Gilland
- Daniel Hugh Kelly as Det. Frank Wajorski
- Richard Lawson as Det. O.Z. Tate
- Craig T. Nelson as Kenneth A. Dutton
- Kristoffer Tabori as Dr. Max Carson

Notable actors who made guest-starring appearances during the show's 13-episode run included John Mahoney, Joe Pantoliano, Ally Sheedy, and Lane Smith.

== Episodes ==
No.	Title	Directed by	Written by	Original release date
0	"Chicago Story"	Jerry London	Eric Bercovici	March 15, 1981
1	"The Hostage Taker"	Harvey S. Laidman	Dennis Capps	March 6, 1982
2	"Outside the Law"	Rod Holcomb	Bob Foster & Robert W. Gilmer	March 13, 1982
3	"Bright Lights, Big City"	Christian I. Nyby II	Dennis Capps	March 20, 1982
4	"Epidemic"	Harvey S. Laidman	Robert W. Gilmer	March 27, 1982
5	"Vendetta"	Corey Allen	David Jacobs	April 3, 1982
6	"Not Quite Paradise: Parts 1 & 2"	Jerry Thorpe	Michael O'Hara	April 16, 1982
7	"Not Quite Paradise: Parts 1 & 2"	Jerry Thorpe	Michael O'Hara	April 16, 1982
8	"Performance"	Michael Caffey	David Assael and Robert W. Gilmer & Dennis Capps and Bob Foster & W H. Over	April 23, 1982
9	"Bad Blood"	Bruce Kessler	Robert Schlitt	April 30, 1982
10	"Dutton's Law"	Lee H. Katzin	David Paulsen	May 7, 1982
11	"Subterranean Blues"	Corey Allen	Robert Schlitt	May 28, 1982
12	"Who Needs the Truth?"	E. Arthur Kean	E. Arthur Kean	June 4, 1982
13	"Half a Chance"	Robert C. Thompson	David Assael	June 11, 1982
