= Marshall Colt =

American actor

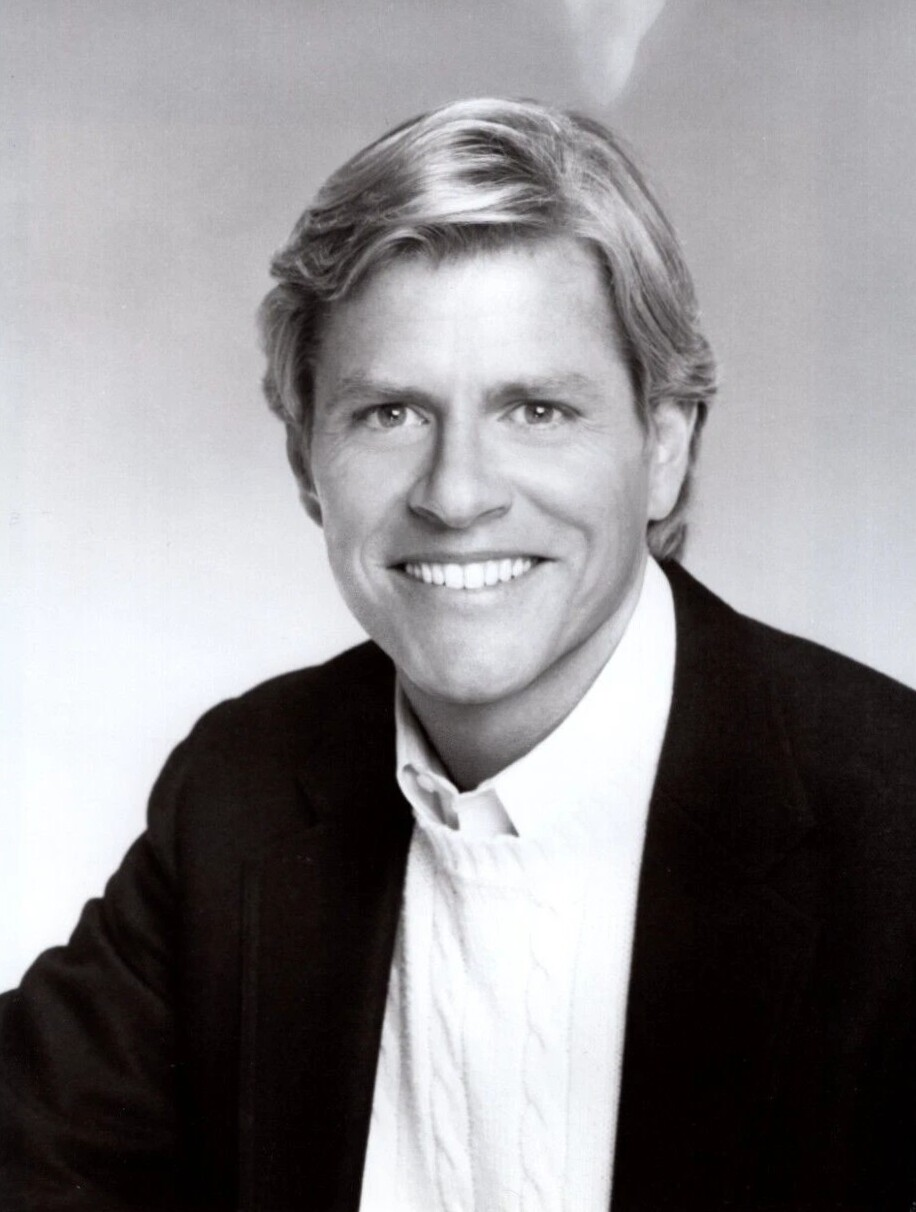
- Colt in 1983
- Born: October 26, 1948 (age 77); New Orleans, Louisiana, USA
- Education: Tulane University; Pepperdine University; Fielding Graduate University
- Occupations: Psychologist since 1994; Actor, 1976–1995; Naval officer, 1970–2000

Marshall Colt (born October 26, 1948) is a retired American management consultant and combat-decorated, former captain in the United States Navy in San Diego, who was an actor in film and television from 1976 to 1995.

He co-starred in the films North Dallas Forty (1979) and Jagged Edge (1985) as well as in the 1981–82 James Arness NBC police procedural McClain's Law.

== Early years ==
A native of New Orleans, Colt graduated from Tulane University with a Bachelor of Science degree in physics. He then served four years in the U.S. Navy, stationed briefly off the coast of Vietnam during the war.

== Acting career ==
In 1976, Colt made his acting debut as Nick in the Berkeley Repertory Theatre production of Who's Afraid of Virginia Woolf? and as Inspector William Holmer in the episode "Castle of Fear" of ABC's police drama The Streets of San Francisco.

In 1978, Colt appeared as Sam Pray in "Great Expectations," the fourth episode of the short-lived CBS legal drama The Paper Chase, starring John Houseman. In 1979, he appeared on the ABC drama Family and in two episodes of Buddy Ebsen's CBS crime drama Barnaby Jones. He also played the role of Art Hartman in the Nick Nolte film North Dallas Forty.

Colt received second billing in the two-hour made-for-TV film McClain's Law, broadcast in November 1981 as a pilot for the same-named police series in which Colt played young detective Harry Gates of the San Pedro, California, Police Department, whose use of modern criminology methods placed him in contrast to his older partner, Jim McClain, played by James Arness, who employed the more traditional approach. McClain's Law premiered some six years after the ending of Arness's former Gunsmoke western series. Colt's other regular series role was in the 1983–84 ABC drama Lottery in which he co-starred as IRS agent Eric Rush, alongside lottery winnings distributor Patrick Sean Flaherty, played by Ben Murphy.

In 1988, Colt was cast as Jack Wheeler, the chairman of the Vietnam Veterans Memorial Fund, in the television film To Heal a Nation, based on the establishment of the Vietnam War Memorial in Washington, D.C. Subsequently, Vietnam veteran Colt spoke at The Wall Memorial Day 1988.

Other roles in television films were as Steven Beck in Beverly Hills Madam, Charles McLean in Maggie, Kelly Hancock in Mercy or Murder?, Andrew Winkler in Guilty of Innocence: The Lenell Geter Story, and Douglas Erickson in Deceptions.

Colt was cast as Bobby Slade in Jagged Edge (1985), as Christopher Dollanganger in Flowers in the Attic (1987), and as Donald Cleary in Illegally Yours (1988).

His last roles in series television were in 1991 as Ross Corman in the episode "Tainted Lady" of Angela Lansbury's CBS drama, Murder, She Wrote and in 1995 in Chuck Norris's Walker, Texas Ranger, in the role of Lieutenant Lee Corbin in the episode "Whitewater, Part I."

== Psychology career ==
Colt obtained his Master of Science in clinical psychology, with an emphasis in marriage and family therapy, from Pepperdine University in Malibu, California. He also holds a Ph.D. in clinical psychology, with a concentration in health psychology, accredited by the American Psychological Association (APA) from Fielding Graduate University in Santa Barbara, California. After an APA-accredited, adult neuropsychology internship at the VA Hospital, Denver, he served a six-month post-doctoral residency in pediatric neuropsychology in Salt Lake City. Colt has been in private practice since 1994.

Colt was formerly based in Denver, where he frequently appeared on radio and television as an expert on psychological topics, including PTSD. He also wrote the syndicated "Ethics" column for the Denver Business Journal. He subsequently relocated to San Diego, and then Newport Beach, California, where he operated Corporate Psychological Management, a consultancy he founded in 1996.
