= McClain's Law =

American crime drama television series

- Genre: Crime drama
- Created by: Eric Bercovici
- Written by: Frank Abatemarco; Eric Bercovici; Walter Dallenbach; Stephen Downing; Allison Hock; Mark Rodgers; Frank Telford; Gerald Sanford
- Directed by: Corey Allen; Kerry Feltham; Bruce Kessler; Vincent McEveety; Gary Nelson; James Sheldon
- Starring: James Arness; George DiCenzo; Marshall Colt
- Composers: James Di Pasquale (all other episodes and theme); Michael Melvoin ("A Time of Peril"); Angela Morley (four: 1.6, 1.10, 1.12, 1.14)
- Country of origin: United States
- Original language: English
- No. of seasons: 1
- No. of episodes: 16

Production
- Executive producers: Eric Bercovici; Richard R. St. Johns
- Producers: Robert H. Justman; Mark Rodgers
- Running time: 44 minutes
- Production companies: Eric Bercovici Productions; MGM Television

Original release
- Network: NBC
- Release: November 20, 1981 – August 24, 1982

McClain's Law is an American crime drama television series that aired on NBC during the 1981–82 season. New episodes ended on March 20, and rebroadcasts continued until August 24, 1982.

== Summary ==
The series starred former Gunsmoke lead James Arness in a rare non-western role as Jim McClain, a former police detective who was medically retired after being wounded in the leg in a gun battle in the line of duty. He returns to duty fifteen years later to avenge the murder and robbery of a friend, and ends up coming out of retirement in order to share his expertise with a younger generation of police officers.

At first, his request to be returned to active duty is met with resistance by police department supervisors. McClain is made to undergo physical fitness tests and a requalification and training program at the police academy. He handily passes all tests and is returned to active duty on the department at his former rank of detective. McClain is tough but compassionate. He is regarded by his colleagues as being an "Old School" cop. He carries a Smith & Wesson .44 caliber revolver when most of his fellow officers carry .38 Special caliber sidearms. His new coworkers come to respect McClain as a consummate professional of unyielding courage. McClain's Law, like several other series from this period, was criticized for its level of violence. The co-stars were Marshall Colt and George DiCenzo. Shaaron Claridge also played a dispatcher. This was Arness' final TV series; hereafter he primarily appeared in a series of made-for-TV movies reprising Gunsmoke.

== Cast ==
- James Arness as Detective Jim McClain
- George DiCenzo as Lieutenant Edward DeNisco
- Marshall Colt as Detective Harry Gates
- Conchata Ferrell as Vangie Cruise
- Carl Franklin as Detective Jerry Cross

== Notable guest stars ==
- Barbara Babcock
- Bibi Besch
- Scott Brady
- Julie Carmen
- Pat Corley
- Richard Jaeckel
- Arte Johnson
- Henry Jones
- Art Lund
- Richard Lynch

== Episodes ==
No.	Title	Directed by	Written by	Original release date
1	"Pilot"	Vincent McEveety	Eric Bercovici	November 20, 1981
2	"Pilot"	Vincent McEveety	Eric Bercovici	November 20, 1981
3	"Requiem for a Narc"	Alan Smithee	Stephen Downing	November 27, 1981
4	"A Time of Peril"	James Sheldon	Frank Telford	December 4, 1981
5	"Let the Victims Beware"	Paul Krasny	Frank Abatemarco	December 11, 1981
6	"Portrait of a Playmate"	Michael O'Herlihy	Gerald Sanford	December 18, 1981
7	"To Save the Queen"	Bruce Kesler	Mark Rodgers	January 8, 1982
8	"A Matter of Honor"	Christian I. Nyby II	Walter Dallenbach	January 15, 1982
9	"The Sign of the Beast: Part 1"	Gary Nelson	Stephen Downing	January 22, 1982
10	"The Sign of the Beast: Part 2"	Gary Nelson	Stephen Downing	January 29, 1982
11	"What Patric Doesn't Know"	Larry Elikann	Frank Abatemarco	February 5, 1982
12	"Green Light"	Corey Allen	Mark Rodgers	February 12, 1982
13	"Use of Deadly Force"	James Sheldon	Gerald Sanford	February 19, 1982
14	"Takeover"	Lee H. Katzin	Frank Abatemarco	March 6, 1982
15	"From the Mouths of Babes"	Bernard McEveety	Joe Viola	March 13, 1982
16	"The Last Hero"	Corey Allen	Frank Abatemarco	March 20, 1982

== DVD release ==
On June 21, 2016, Warner Archive Collection released McClain's Law - The Complete Series on DVD in Region 1 for the very first time. This is a manufacture-on-demand (MOD) release, available exclusively through Warner's online store and Amazon.com.
