= Clyde Kusatsu =

American actor

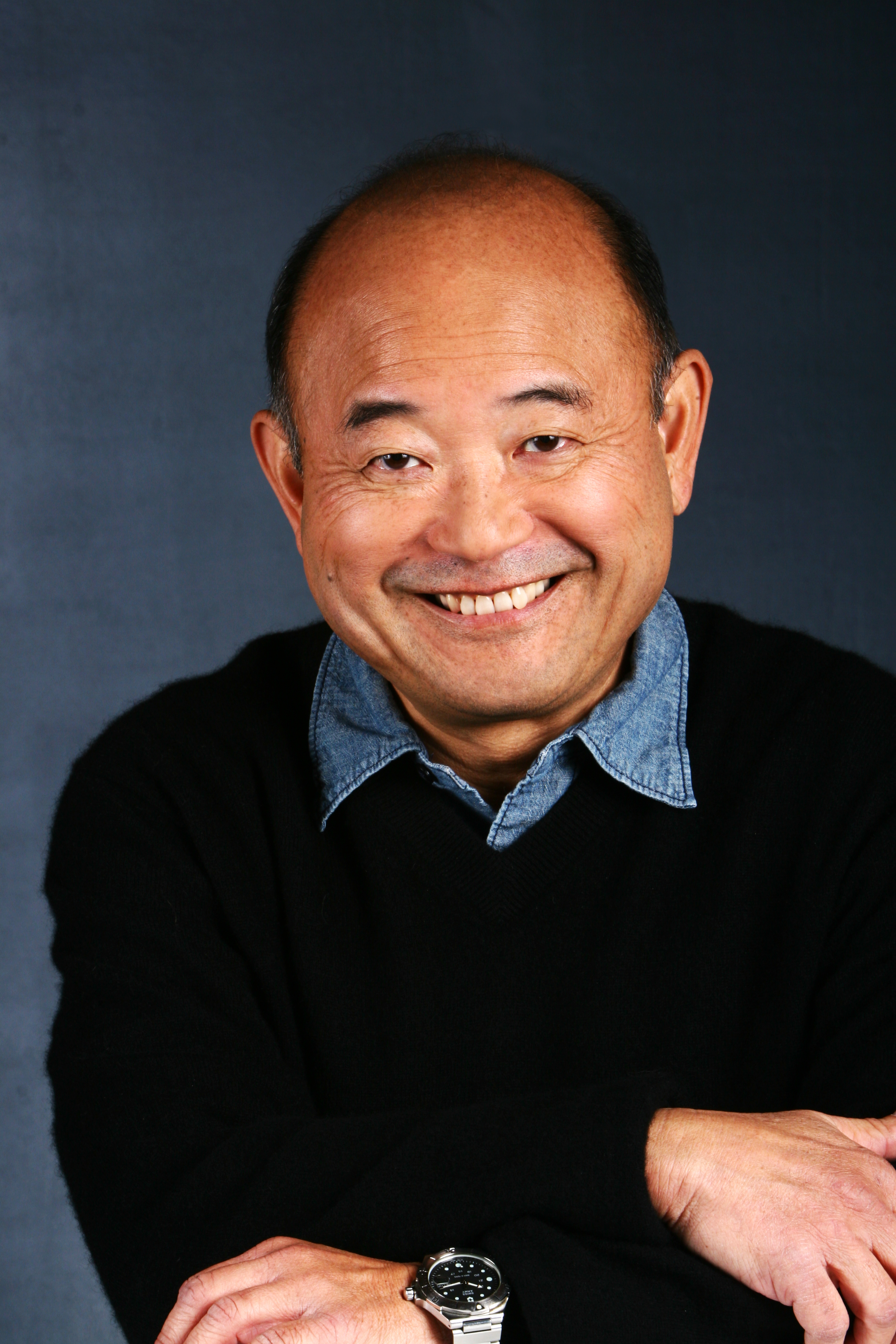
- Born: Honolulu, Territory of Hawaii
- Education: Northwestern University
- Occupation: Actor
- Years active: 1973–present
- Spouse: Gayle Kusatsu (m. 1976)
- Children: 2

Clyde Kusatsu is an American actor. A prolific character actor, he has appeared in over 300 film and television productions since his debut in 1970. He is the Secretary of the SAG-AFTRA Foundation, after previously serving as the first elected President of the SAG-AFTRA Los Angeles Local and was four times elected the National Vice President Los Angeles, from 2013 through 2021.

== Early life and education ==
Kusatsu attended ʻIolani School where he began acting and in Honolulu summer stock. He attended Northwestern University as a theater major, during which time he was the only Asian-American student enrolled at the school. He graduated in 1970, and in 1972 then joined the East West Players, the oldest Asian-American theater company in Los Angeles.

== Career ==
After several years of stage acting, Kusatsu got his first TV roles in five episodes of Kung Fu and four episodes of M*A*S*H, in which he played three different roles. Kusatsu later played the recurring role of Rev. Chong on three episodes of All in the Family and appeared as four different characters on Magnum, P.I., including two episodes as HPD Detective Gordon Katsumoto and a guest role as the Vietnamese Colonel who severely wounds Thomas Magnum.

Kusatsu has been a regular on several television shows, including the adventure series Bring 'Em Back Alive (1982–83), and the Hawaii-set medical drama Island Son (1989–90), playing Dr. Kenji Fushida, the best friend of the main character. His many television movies have included: the CBS Movie of the Week Dr. Strange (1978), in which he played the Marvel Comics character Wong; the film adaptation of Farewell to Manzanar (1976), about Japanese-American internment during World War II; HBO's AIDS docudrama And the Band Played On (1993); and American Tragedy playing famed O.J. Simpson trial Judge Lance Ito. Kusatsu had recurring roles as Vice Admiral Nakamura on Star Trek: The Next Generation, Principal Shimata in several episodes of the 1990s ABC sitcom Family Matters, and co-starred in Margaret Cho's short-lived ABC series All American Girl (1994–1995), the first Asian-American family sitcom in the U.S., as Cho's character's father.

He has worked with Japanese film icon Toshiro Mifune in Midway (1976), John Frankenheimer's Black Sunday (1977), and The Challenge (1982). Kusatsu had supporting roles in Dragon: The Bruce Lee Story (1993), In the Line of Fire (1993), American Pie (1999), Shopgirl, and Sydney Pollack's The Interpreter (both 2005) as Lee Wu, chief of security for the United Nations Headquarters. He had a key supporting role opposite Glenn Close in Bruce Beresford's World War II drama Paradise Road (1997).

He has appeared in several soap operas, including the recurring role of Dr. Dennis Okamura on The Young and the Restless and guest appearances on The Bold and the Beautiful, General Hospital, and Days of Our Lives. Since 2021, he has appeared in a recurring role on Days Of Our Lives, as DiMera Enterprises board member Wei Shin.

== Labor activities ==
In 2012 the Screen Actors Guild (SAG) and the American Federation of Television and Radio Actors (AFTRA), the two labor unions for actors, merged into SAG-AFTRA, and in 2013 Kusatsu became the first elected President of the new SAG-AFTRA Local in Los Angeles. He was also elected the first National Vice President Los Angeles and was re-elected to that office four times, until 2021 when Michelle Hurd was elected to the position. He remains a vocal supporter of union issues, particularly those related to the Film and Television industries. His roles during this period included a part in The Grinder and the father-in-law of Ken Jeong's character in Dr. Ken, and in film, commercials, and voice-over animation, such as The Grocer in Curious George, Netflix' Blue Eye Samurai and Phaeton on AMC+. Kusatsu guest-starred on the second season of Dirty John: The Betty Broderick Story. He was Grandpa Ted in Season 2 of Netflix' Never Have I Ever, and was in episodes of Young Rock, Days of Our Lives, and The United States of Al. In 2024 he was a recurring guest on A Man on the Inside starring Ted Danson on Netflix.

== Personal life ==
Kusatsu has been married to his wife, Gayle (née Shuffler), since 1976. They have two sons, Kevin and Andrew, and two grandsons.

== Filmography ==
=== Film ===
Year	Title	Role	Notes
1974	Airport 1975	Passenger	Uncredited
1976	Alex & the Gypsy	X-Ray Technician	
1976	Midway	Commander Watanabe Yasuji	
1977	Black Sunday	Freighter Captain	
1977	Oh, God!	Supermarket Employee	Uncredited
1977	The Choirboys	Officer Francis Tanaguchi	
1978	Go Tell the Spartans	Colonel Minh	
1979	The Frisco Kid	Mr. Ping	
1979	Meteor	Yamashiro	
1981	...All the Marbles	Clyde Yamashito	
1982	The Challenge	Go	
1982	Lookin' to Get Out	Parking Attendant	
1984	Gimme an 'F'	Japanese Businessman	
1985	Volunteers	Souvanna	
1986	Shanghai Surprise	Joe Go	
1989	Turner & Hooch	Kevin Williams	
1989	Wired	Thomas Noguchi	
1989	Gross Anatomy	Interviewing Professor	
1990	Bird on a Wire	Mr. Takawaki	
1991	The Perfect Weapon	Detective Wong	
1991	Pizza Man	Yasuhiro Nakasone	
1993	Silent Cries	Saburo Saigo	
1993	Dragon: The Bruce Lee Story	History Teacher	
1993	Hot Shots! Part Deux	Prime Minister Soto	Uncredited
1993	Made in America	Bob Takashima	
1993	In the Line of Fire	Secret Service Agent Jack Okura	
1993	Rising Sun	Shoji Tanaka	
1993	Dream Lover	Judge Kurita	
1995	Top Dog	Captain Ken Callahan	
1996	Spy Hard	Noggin	
1996	Aladdin and the King of Thieves	Asian Thief	
1997	Paradise Road	Sergeant "The Snake" Tomiashi	
1998	Godzilla	Japanese Tanker Captain	
1999	American Pie	English Teacher	
2001	Recess: School's Out	Mr. Yamashiro	Voice
2001	Dr. Dolittle 2	Bee	Voice
2002	A Ribbon of Dreams	Fred	
2003	The Singing Detective	Japanese Doctor	
2003	The United States of Leland	Judge	
2003	Bachelorman	Mr. Yi	
2003	Hollywood Homicide	Dr. Owen Chung	
2004	Gas	Mr. Sang	
2004	Paparazzi	Dr. Hanson	
2005	Pretty Persuasion	Judge Carl Munro	
2005	The Interpreter	Lee Wu	
2005	Extreme Dating	Joe	
2005	Shopgirl	Mr. Agasa	
2005	Rumor Has It	Conference Attendee	
2007	Drive-Thru	Fred Fukizaki	
2007	Broken Angel	Dondi	
2008	Harold & Kumar Escape from Guantanamo Bay	Mr. Lee	
2009	Love Happens	Cab Driver	
2009	Why Am I Doing This?	Himself	
2010	Sex Tax: Based on a True Story	Judge	
2010	A Nanny for Christmas	Mr. Halligan	
2012	Any Day Now	Dr. Nakahura	
2013	The Face of Love	Sushi Chef	
2013	The Moment	Dr. Nunakawa	
2013	47 Ronin	Drunken Official	
2021	The Summit of the Gods	Sherpa (voice)	English dub

=== Television ===
Year	Title	Role	Notes
1973–1974	Kung Fu	Lama Campo Kushog / Han Su Lok / Po San / Ying's Son	5 episodes
1973–1982	M*A*S*H	Kwang Duk / Captain Paul Yamato / Sergeant Michael Yee	4 episodes
1974	Tenafly	Airline Attendant	Episode: "Man Running"
1974	Ironside	Parking Attendant	Episode: "Friend or Foe"
1974	Get Christie Love!	Police Sketch Artist	Episode: "Deadly Betrayal"
1974	Mannix	Japanese Attache	Episode: "Enter Tami Okada"
1975	Harry O	The Coroner	Episode: "The Acolyte"
1975	Ellery Queen	Mateo	Episode: "The Adventure of the Blunt Instrument"
1976	The Blue Knight	Eng	Episode: "The Great Wall of Chinatown"
1976	Farewell to Manzanar	Teddy Wakatsuki	Television film
1976	Spencer's Pilots	Jesse	Episode: "The Code"
1976	Delvecchio	Medical Examiner	Episode: "Board of Rights"
1976	Alice	Herb Tanaguchi	Episode: "Mother-in-Law: Part 1"
1976	Baa Baa Black Sheep	Captain Tenyu Araki	Episode: "Prisoners of War"
1976	Hawaii Five-O	Jerry Quan	Episode: "Yes, My Deadly Daughter"
1976–1978	All in the Family	Reverend Chong	3 episodes
1977	Quinn Martin's Tales of the Unexpected	Kenji	Episode: "The Mask of Adonis"
1977	The Rockford Files	Nguyen	Episode: "New Life, Old Dragons"
1977–1981	Quincy, M.E.	Dr. Randolph Mitzubi / Hokaido	2 episodes
1977–1982	Lou Grant	Ken Watanabe / Ralph Tumora	2 episodes
1978	Dr. Strange	Wong	Television film
1978	Taxi	Paul	Episode: "Come as You Aren't"
1979	Supertrain	Shimaju Fukuda	Episode: "The Green Girl"
1980	Hello, Larry	Hotel Clerk	Episode: "The Rock Star: Part 2"
1980	A Perfect Match	Dr. Tommy Chang	Television film
1980	Benson	Stan	Episode: "Thick as Thieves"
1980–1987	Magnum, P.I.	Detective Gordon Katsumoto / Dr. Long Tang / Colonel Ki / Colonel Ky In Flashback / Naval Medical Examiner	8 episodes
1981	Knots Landing	Dr. Akura	2 episodes
1982	The Powers of Matthew Star	Lee	Episode: "Experiments"
1982–1983	Bring 'Em Back Alive	Ali	14 episodes
1982–1984	Simon & Simon	Mr. Tao / Gerald	2 episodes
1983	We Got It Made	Marcel	Episode: "Mickey Goes Topless"
1983	Webster	Doctor	Episode: "Travis"
1983	Masquerade	Sushi	Episode: "Girls for Sale"
1984	Velvet	Dr. Yashima	Television film
1984	Cagney & Lacey	Raulino	Episode: "Unusual Occurrence"
1984	Crazy Like a Fox	Nick	Episode: "Pilot"
1985	Three's a Crowd	Mr. Katsumura	Episode: "A Case of Sour Grapes"
1985	Dallas	Dr. Albert Matsuda	Episode: "Bail Out"
1985	T. J. Hooker	Tran Tam	Episode: "Outcall"
1985	Hunter	Lieutenant Raymond Lau	Episode: "Night of the Dragons"
1985–1986	MacGyver	Sam / Anek	Episode 1.2 "The Golden Triangle"/1 episodes
1986	Remington Steele	San Francisco	Episode: "Steele, Inc."
1986	The Fall Guy	Billy Lok	Episode: "Trial by Fire"
1986	Trapper John, M.D.	Dr. Sung Kang	Episode: "Heart and Seoul"
1986	Alfred Hitchcock Presents	Detective	Episode: "The Creeper"
1986	Intimate Encounters	Professor Ikeda	Television film
1986	Together We Stand	Chao	Episode: "Betrothal"
1986	ALF	Skydiver	Episode: "Jump"
1987	Dynasty	Dr. Chen	Episode: "A Love Remembered"
1987	Shell Game	Daniel Cho	Episode: "Pai Gow"
1987	Sidekicks	Dr. Tosh	Episode: "The Patusani Always Rings Twice"
1987	L.A. Law	Judge T.S. Masuoka	Episode: "Sparky Brackman R.I.P."
1987	Stingray	Attending Surgeon	Episode: "Anytime, Anywhere"
1987	The Highwayman	Chairman Morotana	Episode: "The Highwayman"
1987	The Facts of Life	"Budget Bob"	Episode: "Down and Out in Malibu: Part 2"
1987	Laguna Heat	The Coroner	Television film
1987	Mistress	Miki	Television film
1988	Wiseguy	Kenny Sushia	3 episodes
1988	Tour of Duty	LTC Tho	Episode: "Angel of Mercy"
1988	Who's the Boss?	Kim Lee	Episode: "The Two Tonys"
1988	Run Till You Fall	Fujimoto	Television film
1988	Murphy's Law	Derva	Episode: "The Room Above the Indian Grocery"
1988	Thirtysomething	Dr. Richards	Episode: "The Mike Van Dyke Show"
1989	Annie McGuire	Ambassador Kukla	Episode: "Soft Hearted Annie"
1989	The Hogan Family	Sam Matsuda	Episode: "Secretarial Poole"
1989	The Road Raiders	Shimoto	Television film
1989	Small Wonder	Mr. Saito	Episode: "Thy Neighbor's Wife"
1989	The Smurfs	Additional Voices	Episode: "Smurfs That Time Forgot"
1989–1990	Island Son	Dr. Kenji Fushida	19 episodes
1989–1994	Star Trek: The Next Generation	Admiral Tujiro Nakamura	3 episodes
1990	Revealing Evidence: Stalking the Honolulu Strangler	Lieutenant Arioto	Television film
1990	Parker Lewis Can't Lose	Mr. Loopman	Episode: "Pilot"
1990	In the Line of Duty: A Cop for the Killing	Matsumo	Television film
1991	Dear John	Officer #2	Episode: "John and Kirk's Excellent Adventure"
1991	A Different World	Kinishiwa Representative	Episode: "The Cash Isn't Always Greener"
1991	And the Sea Will Tell	Enoki	Television film
1991	Good & Evil	Tensing	Episode: "Pilot"
1991	Lies Before Kisses	Lieutenant Hand	Television film
1991	Jailbirds	Lieutenant Hand	Television film
1991	Baby of the Bride	Dr. Chang	Television film
1991–1992	Captain Planet and the Planeteers	Dr. Chang (voice)	3 episodes
1991–1994	Family Matters	Principal Edgar Shimata	3 episodes
1992	The Legend of Prince Valiant	Chung Ling-Su (voice)	Episode: "The Dawn of Darkness"
1992	Civil Wars	Toshio Furukawa	Episode: "Denise and De Nuptials"
1992	Raven	Ken Tanaka	Episode: "Return of the Black Dragon"
1992	Designing Women	Lewis	Episode: "Trial and Error"
1992	The Streets of Beverly Hills	Gudmunssen	Television film
1992–1999	Beverly Hills, 90210	Coroner / Frank	2 episodes
1993	Class of '96	Professor Ashira	Episode: "Midterm Madness"
1993	Sirens	Billy Cota	Episode: "Everybody Lies"
1993	And the Band Played On	Blood Bank Executive	Television film
1993	Lois and Clark: The New Adventures of Superman	Public Affairs Officer	Episode: "Pilot"
1993	Mighty Max	Hanuman (voice)	Episode: "The Maxnificent Seven"
1994	The Adventures of Brisco County, Jr.	Roy Shimamura	Episode: "Brooklyn Dodgers"
1994	Deconstructing Sarah	Officer Okawa	Television film
1994	SWAT Kats: The Radical Squadron	Islander	Voice, episode: "Volcanus Erupts!/The Origin of Dr. Viper"
1994	All-American Girl	Benny Kim	18 episodes
1994–1995	Fantastic Four	Karnak / Dr. Neville	Voice, 4 episodes
1994–1997	Walker, Texas Ranger	Detective Danny Cho / Dr. Sweeney	2 episodes
1995	Ellen	Judge Mitchell Sung	Episode: "Three Strikes"
1995	Phantom 2040	Akira	Voice, episode: "Down the Line"
1995	Marker	Detective Akida	Episode: "Discovery"
1995	The Wayans Bros.	Mr. Mitsumoto	Episode: "Brazilla vs. Rodney"
1995	Favorite Deadly Sins	Saint Peter	Television film
1995–1999	The Sylvester & Tweety Mysteries	Mr. Kim / Soh Fishimene	Voice, 2 episodes
1996	Maybe This Time	Noriyukio	Episode: "Break a Leg"
1996	Gargoyles	Kai / Dr. Arnada	Voice, 2 episodes
1996	Mighty Ducks	Tai Quack Do	Episode: "Power Play"
1996	Murder One	Dr. Yamashita	Episode: "Chapter Two, Year Two"
1996–1997	The Real Adventures of Jonny Quest	Dr. Zin / Guard	Voice, 4 episodes
1997	Touched by an Angel	Dr. Robertson	Episode: "Forget-Me-Not"
1997	Bruno the Kid	Engineer / Chang	Voice, 2 episodes
1997	Party of Five	Judge Michael A. Katsu	Episode: "Past Imperfect"
1997	Total Security	Seiji Ingawa	Episode: "The Never Bending Story"
1997	Pinky and the Brain	Hama	Voice, episode: "Big in Japan"
1997	Extreme Ghostbusters	Various Characters	Voice, 2 episodes
1997	City Guys	Dr. Mortia	Episode: "Future Shock"
1998	The Closer	Ted Kasahara	Episode: "Pilot"
1998	Adventures from the Book of Virtues	Rich Man / Servant	Voice, episode: "Gratitude"
1998	Superman: The Animated Series	Dr. Cornell	Voice, episode: "Little Girl Lost"
1998	Stressed Eric	Kanagawa-San	Voice, episode: "Tidy"
1998	Babylon 5: Thirdspace	Bill Morishi	Television film
1998	The Net	Greg Lin	Episode: "Kill the Buddha"
1998	Histeria!	Hongxi / Peking Man	Voice, 2 episodes
1998	Buddy Faro	Lieutenant Wong	Episode: "Touched by an Amnesiac"
1998	Chicago Hope	Frank Fenton	Episode: "Viagra-Vated Assault"
1998	Maggie	Assisting Surgeon	Episode: "Art History"
1998	Vengeance Unlimited	Judge Clyde Kurosawa	Episode: "Legalese"
1998	Godzilla: The Series	Japanese Border Patrol Agent	Voice, episode: "Competition"
1998	Mickey Mouse Works	Additional Voices	Episode: #1.1"
1998–2002	The Practice	Judge Stephen Chin	2 episodes
1999	Rude Awakening	Mr. Tranh	Episode: "Trude Awakening"
1999	Dharma & Greg	Al	Episode: "Welcome to the Hotel Calamari"
1999	Any Day Now	Judge C. Eastlake	Episode: "It's Not You, It's Me"
1999	For Your Love	Mr. Sato	Episode: "The Couple's Court"
1999–2000	Batman Beyond	Coach Fitz, Mr. Tan, Jimmy Lin, Mr. Fong	Voice, 4 episodes
1999–2002	Providence	Pediatrician / Henry Yamada	2 episodes
2000	The West Wing	Joe	Episode: "Lord John Marbury"
2000	Rugrats	Mr. Hasagawa	Voice, episode: "Incredible Shrinking Babies/Miss Manners"
2000	Pepper Ann	Mayor Kim	Voice, episode: "The Sellout/The Telltale Fuzzy"
2000	The Pretender	Li Ho	Episode: "The Agent of Year Zero"
2000	Ally McBeal	Dr. Myron Okubo	2 episodes
2000	Buzz Lightyear of Star Command	Ranger #1 / Warden Yung	Voice, 2 episodes
2000	Malcolm in the Middle	Ice Cream Man	Episode: "Traffic Jam"
2000	American Tragedy	Judge Lance Ito	Miniseries
2000	JAG	Senator Theodore Fujiwara / Captain Morimoto	2 episodes
2001	The Division	Unknown	Episode: "Secrets and Lies"
2001	Citizen Baines	Grant Tanaka	4 episodes
2001	The Wild Thornberrys: The Origin of Donnie	Sun Bear	Voice, television film
2001	The Grim Adventures of Billy & Mandy	Japanese Scientist / Japanese Business Guy	Voice, episode: "Smell of Vengeance/Fiend Is Like Friend Without the 'r'"
2001	Jackie Chan Adventures	Gang Leader	Voice, episode: "Mother of All Battles"
2001	Heavy Gear: The Animated Series	Kusunoki Tachi	Voice, 5 episodes
2001	Justice League	Japanese Ambassador	Voice, episode: "Secret Origins"
2001	Family Law	Judge Paul Hamawaki	2 episodes
2001–2003	Samurai Jack	Father / Old Man / Dad / Grand Master	Voice, 3 episodes
2002	Even Stevens	"Tex" Nagita	Episode: "The King Sloppy"
2002	Dan Dare: Pilot of the Future	Dagg / Ling / Equinox	Voice, 3 episodes
2003	Days of Our Lives	Nobu	Episode: "#9569"
2003	What's New, Scooby-Doo?	Dr. Akira Onodera / Fisherman / Desk Clerk	Voice, episode: "Big Appetite in Little Tokyo"
2003	Nip/Tuck	Dr. Hiroshi	Episode: "Adelle Coffin"
2003	The Lyon's Den	Judge	Episode: "Ex"
2003	One on One	Yoon	Episode: "East Meets East Coast"
2003–2005	Lilo & Stitch: The Series	Mr. Wong / Bald Tourist / Luau Host / Mayor Kim	Voice, 7 episodes
2004	Everwood	Edward Ogawa	Episode: "Your Future Awaits"
2004	The Librarian: Quest for the Spear	Head Monk	Television film
2004	Kim Possible Movie: So the Drama	Nakasumi	Voice, television film
2004–2006	Still Standing	Johnny	3 episodes
2005	The Closer	Dr. Tanaka	Episode: "Pilot"
2005	Strong Medicine	Dr. Stan Liem	Episode: "Rhythm of the Heart"
2005	Avatar: The Last Airbender	Monk Pasang / Calm Man / Storyteller	Voice, 4 episodes
2005	Numbers	Antiquities Dealer	Episode: "Bones of Contention"
2006	Charmed	Lo Pan	Episode: "12 Angry Zen"
2006	Monk	Judge Rienzo	Episode: "Mr. Monk Gets Jury Duty"
2006	Maya & Miguel	Maggie's Dad	Voice, episode: "After School"
2006	Hellboy: Sword of Storms	Additional Voices	Television film
2006	Shark	Judge Chudacoff	Episode: "Déjà Vu All Over Again"
2006	Boston Legal	Judge Matsumura	2 episodes
2006–2007	Eloise: The Animated Series	Mr. Takahashi	Voice, 4 episodes
2006–2021	Curious George	The Grocer / Mr. Okano / Hideki / Radio Announcer	Voice, 9 episodes
2006–2012	The Young and the Restless	Dr. Dennis Okamura	27 episodes
2007	Pandemic	Dr. Kenji Ito	Miniseries
2007	ER	Review Board Doctor #1	Episode: "Dying is Easy"
2007	A.T.O.M.	Master Kwan	Voice, 2 episodes
2007	Fugly	Doctor	Television film
2008	The Spectacular Spider-Man	Ted Twaki	Voice, episode: "Reaction"
2008	Chuck	Morimoto	Episode: "Chuck Versus Tom Sawyer"
2009	Back at the Barnyard	Wise One	Voice, episode: "Pig Amok/Sun Cow"
2009	The Secret Saturdays	Chong	Voice, episode: "Curse of the Stolen Tiger"
2009	Dollhouse	Dr. Makido	Episode: "Belonging"
2009	Curious George: A Very Monkey Christmas	The Grocer	Voice, television film
2009–2016	NCIS	Mr. Rin / Benjamin Franklin	2 episodes
2010–2011	Law & Order: LA	Judge Bradley Rumford	2 episodes
2010–2012	The Bold and the Beautiful	Judge Clayton	4 episodes
2011	$#*! My Dad Says	Mortimer Foo	Episode: "The Better Father"
2011	Hawaii Five-0	Judge Kamalei	Episode: "Loa Aloh"
2011	Fairly Legal	Joseph Chang	Episode: "My Best Friend's Prenup"
2011–2015	The Penguins of Madagascar	Shingen	Voice, 2 episodes
2012	New Girl	Judge	Episode: "Jess & Julia"
2012	The Legend of Korra	Additional Voices	Episode: "The Voice in the Night"
2012	Scooby-Doo! Mystery Incorporated	Picnicker	Voice, episode: "Heart of Evil"
2013	Ben and Kate	Mr. Su	Episode: "Father-Daughter Dance"
2013	Franklin & Bash	Judge Marcus Koh	Episode: "Out of the Blue"
2013	Raising Hope	Mr. Lee	Episode: "Burt Bucks"
2015	General Hospital	Judge Chan	Episode: "#13256"
2015	Major Lazer	Store Owner	Voice, episode: "Fizzy Fever"
2015	The Grinder	Joseph Yao	Episode: "Giving Thanks, Getting Justice"
2015–2016	Dr. Ken	Jerry	2 episodes
2016	24: Legacy	Senator	Episode: "12:00 p.m.-1:00 p.m."
2017	Doubt	Dr. Benjamin Lau	Episode: "Then and Now"
2017	Madam Secretary	Choden Gyatso	Episode: "Swept Away"
2017	Be Cool, Scooby-Doo!	Mr. Kagawa	Voice, episode: "The Curse of Kaniaku"
2017	Dice	Judge Smith	Episode: "The Trial"
2018	Designated Survivor	Japanese Finance Minister Omono	Episode: "In the Dark"
2018	The Cool Kids	Norman	Episode: "Thanksgiving at Murray's"
2019	The Lion Guard	Domog	Voice, episode: "Ghost of the Mountain"
2021	Never Have I Ever	Ted Yoshida	2 episodes
2022	The Really Loud House	Mr. Yanaga	Episode: "The Banana Split Decision"
2003, 2022–present	Days of Our Lives	Nobu / Mr. Wei Shin	
2024	Avatar: The Last Airbender	Kaja	Episode: "Aang"
2024–2025	A Man on the Inside	Grant Yokohama	7 episodes
2026–present	Avatar: Seven Havens	Commander Bountan, Additional Voices	Voice

=== Video games ===
Year	Title	Role
2007	Driver '76	Mr. Zhou
2007	Spider-Man 3	Dragon Tail Leader / Additional Voices
