= Stick Around (TV pilot) =

- Genre: Science fiction sitcom
- Written by: Fred Freeman; Lawrence J. Cohen
- Directed by: Bill Hobin
- Starring: Andy Kaufman; Fred McCarren; Nancy New; Cliff Norton; Craig Richard Nelson
- Theme music composer: Rob Hegel; Carol George
- Opening theme: "Stick Around"
- Country of origin: United States
- Original language: English
- No. of episodes: 1

Production
- Producers: Fred Freeman; Lawrence J. Cohen
- Production locations: Metromedia Square, Hollywood, California
- Editor: Jay Scherberth
- Running time: Approx. 0:28:25
- Production companies: T.A.T. Communications Company; Humble Productions, Inc.

Original release
- Network: ABC
- Release: May 30 – May 30, 1977

Stick Around is an unsold television pilot for ABC, starring Andy Kaufman. Only one episode was ever made, airing on 30 May 1977.

Kaufman portrayed Andy, a run-down servant robot in the future. He used the same voice of his "Foreign Man" character that would one day become the signature voice of Latka Gravas on Taxi.

The pilot also starred Nancy New and Fred McCarren as Elaine and Vance Keefer, a married couple in the year 2055, and their neighbour Mr. Burkus played by Cliff Norton The plot of the episode revolves around Andy the robot's inadequacies as an older model, and whether or not they should replace him. Vance owns an antique store, and there are a lot of jokes that revolve around his misconceptions about the antiques he has, all of which are common household appliances of the 1970s. Vance is very frustrated by Andy's incompetence but eventually he and Elaine decide to keep him.

Andy would revive the robot character to some degree in the 1981 film Heartbeeps.
