= Fred McCarren =

American actor (1951–2006)

- Born: Frederick West McCarren; April 12, 1951; Butler, Pennsylvania, U.S.
- Died: July 2, 2006 (aged 55); Butler, Pennsylvania, U.S.
- Occupation: Actor
- Years active: 1977–1991
- Spouse: Lisa Hogan (m. 1982–2006)

Frederick West "Fred" McCarren (April 12, 1951 – July 2, 2006) was an American television and film actor. He gained recognition for his roles on the television series Amanda's (1983) and Hill Street Blues (1984).

== Life and career ==
McCarren was born on April 12, 1951, in Butler, Pennsylvania. He graduated from Butler Senior High School where he starred in several plays. After attending the University of Cincinnati and Point Park College, he left for a different kind of campus – Ringling Bros. and Barnum & Bailey Clown College in Venice, Florida – and instead of joining the circus afterward, he headed for New York City where he immediately found work in TV commercials.

A subsequent career in film and television followed soon thereafter from the late 1970s throughout the 1980s. He starred opposite Bea Arthur on the short-lived 1983 sitcom Amanda's and he later made guest appearances on television shows such as Scarecrow and Mrs. King, Hill Street Blues, Remington Steele and The Golden Girls and S1 E8 of The Dukes of Hazzard where he played a chicken farmer that stole Boss Hog's liquor money.

McCarren married Lisa Hogan on December 30, 1982. After several years of living in Tarzana, California, the couple moved back to his native Pennsylvania in 1989 where they focused on raising their six children. He continued to work in both radio and television commercials and his voice was heard as the crazy Dr. Sanchez in radio spots for the Mad Mex restaurant chain, and he was seen as the coach in a series of TV commercials for Dick's Sporting Goods, as well as TV spots for PNC, PPG, Comcast and Builder's Surplus.

== Death ==
McCarren died on July 2, 2006, at the age of 55 from colon cancer at Butler Memorial Hospital in Butler, Pennsylvania.

== Filmography ==
Film
Year	Title	Role	Notes
1977	The Goodbye Girl	Richard III Cast	
1980	Xanadu	Richie	
1981	The Boogens	Mark Kinner	
1982	Class Reunion	Gary Nash	
1983	The Star Chamber	Robert Karras	
1983	The American Snitch	Jeff Morton	
1988	The Boost	Tom	
Television
Year	Title	Role	Notes
1977	Stick Around	Vance Keefer	Episode: "Pilot"
1977	Tabitha	Jeff Baron	Episode: "What's Wrong with Mister Right?"
1978	On Our Own		Episode: "The Bare Truth"
1978	Free Country	Sidney Gewertzman	Main cast (5 episodes)
1978	How to Pick Up Girls!	Donald Becker	TV movie
1979	Alice	Sean	Episode: "If the Shoe Fits"
1979	The Dukes of Hazzard	Neil Bishop	Episode: "The Big Heist"
1979	The Last Convertible	Paul McCreed	TV miniseries
1980	Family	Dan Epstein	Episode: "Hard Times"
1980	Goodtime Girls	George's friend	Episode: "Loose Lips"
1980	Marriage Is Alive and Well	Chris Dennis	TV film
1981	I'm a Big Girl Now	Boyfriend	Episode: "It's Him or Me"
1981	Here's Boomer	David	Episode: "The Prince and the Boomer"
1981	Red Flag: The Ultimate Game	Frank	TV movie
1983	Amanda's	Marty Cartwright	Main cast (13 episodes)
1983	At Ease	Jerry Gilmore	Episode: "A Tankful of Dollars"
1983	Scarecrow and Mrs. King	Marshall Holt	Episode: "Magic Bus"
1983	Remington Steele	Frank Dannon	Episode: "Altared Steele"
1984	Hill Street Blues	Stuart Casey	Recurring role (3 episodes)
1984	Lottery!		Episode: "Honolulu: 3 – 2 = 1"
1984	Gimme a Break!	Tim Donovan	Episode: "New Orleans" (Parts 1 & 2)
1984	Brothers	Dennis	Episode: "Standards and Practices"
1984	Too Close for Comfort	Michael McKenna	Episode: "Quick on the Draw"
1986	Hardcastle and McCormick	Richard Wall	Episode: "When I Look Back on All the Things"
1986	It's a Living	Alan Steckler	Episode: "The Jerks"
1987	Shell Game	Vince Vanneman	Main cast (6 episodes)
1987	Scarecrow and Mrs. King	Marshall Holt	Episode: "Suitable for Framing"
1987	Throb	Wally	Episode: "Torn Between Two Lovers"
1987	Mr. President	Fred	Recurring role (2 episodes)
1991	The Golden Girls	Detective	Episode: "The Pope's Ring", (final appearance)
