= Night Killer =

- Directed by: Claudio Fragasso
- Screenplay by: Claudio Fragasso; Rosella Drudi
- Story by: Claudio Fragasso
- Produced by: Franco Gaudenzi
- Starring: Tara Buckman; Peter Hooten; Richard Foster
- Cinematography: Antonio Maccoppi
- Edited by: Giovan Battista Mattei
- Production company: Flora Film
- Distributed by: C.R.C. Cin.ca Romana Cineproduzioni
- Release date: August 1990
- Running time: 85 minutes
- Country: Italy

Night Killer (Italian: Non aprite quella porta 3) is a 1990 Italian slasher film directed by Claudio Fragasso. On its release in Italy, it was promoted as being part of The Texas Chainsaw Massacre. The film is not part of the series and bears little content from the previously released films.

== Plot ==
A psychopathic maniac costumed in a grotesque hood matched with a sharp-clawed glove is stalking the women of Virginia Beach, killing them in a violent spree of misogynistic murders that terrorize the city. Melanie Beck, a devoted mother and wife, narrowly survives a violent kidnapping, rape. and attempt on her life by the same murderer, but once she's recovered battered but alive, she doesn't recall the maniac's identity due to her amnesia from the violence. Her husband, a police detective, is assigned to the case and vows to make sure she's kept safe, lest the maniac tries again to slaughter her. As the killings don't stop, Melanie must try and protect herself and the people and life she loves, by confronting the terrifying truth that the sick murderer has always been targeting her, and that the threat to her safety and very livelihood is much closer than anyone would dare to accept. Can she break from the killer's sights while fighting to keep her trust in everyone around her, or will the psychopath successfully take everything away from her as revenge for her evasion and defiance, before hunting Melanie down in a last ditch effort to claim her as the most coveted victim?

== Cast ==
- Tara Buckman as Melanie Beck
- Peter Hooten as Axel
- Richard Foster as Sherman Floyd
- Mel Davis as Detective Clark
- Lee Lively as Dr. Willow
- Tova Sardot as Clarissa

== Production ==
Night Killer was shot in the United States. After Fragasso finished the film, the producers hired Bruno Mattei to shoot additional scenes of graphic gore before the film's release in Italy.

== Style ==
Paul Zachary of Bloody Disgusting stated that the film combined elements of giallo and more straightforward slasher films. Zachary described it as a "Franken-film" combining several bit and pieces of other related work.

== Release ==
Night Killer was first released in Italy in August 1990. The film was released the same year that Leatherface: The Texas Chainsaw Massacre III was distributed in Italy and was promoted unofficially as a sequel in The Texas Chainsaw Massacre franchise despite the plot not bearing any relation to the rest of the series. The films Italian title, Non aprite quella porta 3 riffs on the Italian title for the Texas Chainsaw Massacre series. The film was released on DVD and blu ray by Severin Films on June 25, 2019.

== Reception ==
From retrospective reviews, Jason Shawhan of Nashville Scene compared it to Bad Dreams and The Invasion stating it did not reach those levels of "ripoff and quilt cinema" comparing it to Night Porter and A Nightmare on Elm Street, concluding that it was a "trashy film that wants to provoke every possible emotion, and the fact that it manages to find genuine empathy amid the chest wounds and obscene phone calls and sexualized capers makes for an experience that just doesn't happen very often in movies anymore".
