= Peter Hooten =

American retired actor (born 1950)

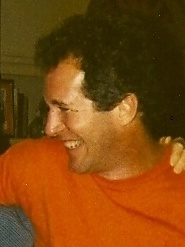
- Hooten in 1992
- Born: John Peter Hooten; November 29, 1950 (age 75); Clermont, Florida, U.S.
- Education: Ithaca College
- Occupation: Actor
- Years active: 1968–1990; 2012–2013; 2016–2017

John Peter Hooten (born November 29, 1950) is an American retired actor. He is best known for playing the title character in the television film Dr. Strange (1978).

== Career ==
Hooten started acting in 1968 at the age of 17. He appeared as an uncredited extra in Midnight Cowboy. He attended Ithaca College in upstate New York. His first speaking role was a 1969 appearance on the TV drama Marcus Welby, M.D.. Later, he played the title character in the 1978 TV film Dr. Strange and appeared as a guest star in The Waltons, Mod Squad, and Mannix.

== TV and filmography ==
| Year | Title | Role | Notes |
|---|---|---|---|
| 1968 | Midnight Cowboy | Extra | Movie |
| 1969 | Marcus Welby, M.D. | Richard Ross | TV series |
| 1970 | The Bold Ones: The Protectors | Clancy Austin | TV series |
| 1970 | Tribes | Scrunch | TV movie |
| 1971 | Dan August | Troy Stedman | TV series |
| 1972 | Night of Terror | Chris Arden | TV movie |
| 1972 | Mod Squad | Jim Styles | TV series |
| 1972 | Mannix | Don Wilkerson | TV series |
| 1972 | The Waltons | Jamie | TV series |
| 1975 | Slashed Dreams | Robert | Movie |
| 1975 | One of Our Own | Dr. Madison | TV movie |
| 1975 | Prisoners | Unknown | Independent Film |
| 1975 | A Woman for All Men | Paul McCoy | Movie |
| 1975 | Bronk | Unknown | TV series |
| 1976 | The Student Body | Carter | Movie |
| 1977 | Orca | Paul | Movie |
| 1978 | The Inglorious Bastards | Tony | Movie |
| 1978 | The Fifth Commandment | Leo Redder | Movie |
| 1978 | Dr. Strange | Dr. Stephen Strange | TV movie |
| 1980 | Dan August: Once Is Never Enough | Troy Stedman | TV movie |
| 1981 | Fantasies | Damir | Movie |
| 1982 | 2020 Texas Gladiators | Halakron | Movie |
| 1982 | The Soldier | The Soldier's Force | Movie |
| 1982 | Born Beautiful | Tony | TV movie |
| 1987 | Tempi di guerra | Captain Rosen | Movie |
| 1987 | Brothers in Blood | Charlie | Movie |
| 1988 | Just a Damned Soldier | Unknown | Movie |
| 1990 | Night Killer | Axel | Movie |
| 2007 | In Search of Steve Ditko | Dr. Strange (Archive footage) | TV movie documentary |
| 2013 | House of Blood | Frank Martin | Movie |
| 2017 | Souleater | Sheriff Buford Talley | Movie |

== Personal life ==
Hooten and the poet James Merrill were romantic partners from 1983 until the death of the latter in 1995. After 16 years in New York City, and some time in Connecticut, Hooten moved to St. Augustine, Florida. As of 2009, Hooten has lived in Sarasota, Florida.
