= The Man in the Santa Claus Suit =

Television film directed by Corey Allen

- Genre: Drama
- Screenplay by: George Kirgo
- Story by: Leonard Gershe
- Directed by: Corey Allen
- Starring: Fred Astaire; Gary Burghoff; John Byner; Bert Convy; Majel Barrett
- Music by: Peter Matz
- Country of origin: United States
- Original language: English

Production
- Executive producers: Dick Clark; Al Schwartz
- Producer: Lee Miller
- Cinematography: Woody Omens
- Editor: Lovel Ellis
- Running time: 104 minutes
- Production company: Dick Clark Productions

Original release
- Network: NBC
- Release: December 23, 1979

The Man in the Santa Claus Suit is a 1979 American made-for-television Christmas fantasy drama film starring Fred Astaire (in his final television film role), Gary Burghoff, John Byner, Bert Convy, and Majel Barrett about three different men (a fugitive tramp, a lonely schoolteacher and a divorced father) who all purchase Santa Claus suits for various reasons. The film was originally broadcast on NBC on December 21, 1979.

== Plot ==
The mysterious owner of a New York City costume store (Astaire) rents Santa suits to three different men. He later shows up in various roles (chauffeur, policeman, jeweler, hot dog vendor, taxi driver, floor walker and choral director) to help the men change their lives.

Bob Willis (Burghoff) is a math teacher who is madly in love with a young fashion model and prominent figure in the disco scene, Polly Primer (Tara Buckman). Polly, however, is dating wealthy and handsome Rod Sanborn (Greenan). He hopes to impress her by showing up in a Santa suit, but withdraws when he learns of Rod's marriage proposal to her. Polly is not sure to marry Rod and hints to Bob that she longs for being swept away by another guy, but Bob is too shy to act on it. Realizing he would lose her forever to Rod, he interrupts her at a fashion show and tells her he loves her. Polly then reveals having fallen in love with him ever since he first spoke about math, and she accepts his marriage proposal.

Stan Summerville was once a promising chef, but is now a homeless crook who found a firearm used in a bank robbery by Babyskin (Barth) and Bruno Betinger (Feinberg). Stan rents a Santa Claus in order to hide from them, and while his friend Eddie (Vitte) distracts the criminals, he breaks into a wealthy residence to rob the people who live there. Residents are Dora (Fabray) and Dickie Dayton (Gould), a once poor couple who became millionaires after striking oil. They love performing and disapprove of their bratty grandchildren Melissa (Lytton) and Lance (Petersen), remembering the days that they did hard labor to earn money. Because of once being poor, they sympathize with Stan - despite him holding them at gunpoint - and they decide to nurse him back to health after their butler Chandler (Wells) hits Stan unconscious. While Stan restores his faith in humankind due to the hospitality of the Daytons, Babyskin and Bruno track him to the mansion. Ultimately, Melissa and Lance save the day by attacking the criminals, and the police reward Stan with $25,000 for capturing the wanted criminals.

Gil Travis (Convy) is a busy political aide who works for a Senator, and rents a Santa suit to surprise his estranged son Terry (Gower) on Christmas Eve in between his tight working schedule. His wife Linda (Bundy) separated from him because he was never home, and Terry is equally as estranged to him. Both Gil and Linda long for the days when Gil was a struggling writer whose novel only sold fourteen copies, though their happiness was defined by love instead of money. During Christmas, he shows Linda that he has learned to put family first, by ignoring his work to tuck his son into bed.

In the end, the costume shop owner reveals himself to be Santa Claus as he flies into the night aboard his sleigh.

== Cast ==
- Fred Astaire in nine roles (costume shop owner, chauffeur, policeman, jeweler, hot dog vendor, taxi driver, floor walker, choral director and Santa Claus)
- Gary Burghoff as Bob Willis
- John Byner as Stan Summerville
- Bert Convy as Gil Travis
- Tara Buckman as Polly Primer
- Brooke Bundy as Linda Travis
- Eddie Barth as Babyskin
- Ron Feinberg as Bruno Betinger
- Nanette Fabray as Dora Dayton
- Harold Gould as Dickie Dayton
- Ray Vitte as Eddie
- Debbie Lytton as Melissa
- Patrick Petersen as Lance
- Danny Wells as Chandler
- Carlo Imperato as Dom
- Andre Gower as Terry Travis
- David Greenan as Rod Sanborn
- Majel Barrett as Miss Forsythe

== Production ==
=== Music ===
==== Opening theme ====
The opening theme was That Once a Year Christmas Day performed by Fred Astaire.

==== Show Tunes ====
The Daytons sing a variety of show tunes including:

- "Mississippi Mud"
- "The Sidewalks of New York"
- "I Love My Baby, My Baby Loves Me"

== Reception ==
=== Release ===
The Man in the Santa Claus Suit aired on NBC on December 23, 1979. The film was released on August 1, 1989 on VHS.

== See also ==
- List of Christmas films
- Santa Claus in film
