= Tara Buckman =

American actress

- Occupation: Actress
- Years active: 1977–1994

Tara Buckman is an American retired television and film actress. Her active career was mainly confined to the late 1970s to the mid-1990s. Though never reaching feature status, Buckman was nonetheless a regular guest star on many television series. She also appeared in minor roles in feature films.

== Early life ==
Tara Buckman was an Army brat whose longest time living in one house was two years until her family moved to Virginia Beach, Virginia when she was a teenager. While she was a waitress in a hotel dining room in Norfolk, Virginia, producer James Goldstone saw her, and he later offered her a part in the film Rollercoaster. Three months later, she moved to Los Angeles. After arriving there, she gained a contract with Universal Studios with Goldstone's assistance.

== Career ==
=== Television ===
Buckman portrayed Officer Brandy Ames in The Misadventures of Sheriff Lobo and Cat Hellman in The Master. She is also remembered for her guest appearances in episodes of such 1970s and 1980s television fare as The Rockford Files, Kojak, CHiPs, The Hardy Boys Mysteries, Quincy, M.E., Buck Rogers in the 25th Century and Brave New World. She also appeared in the 1979 television movies Death Car on the Freeway and The Man in the Santa Claus Suit, and portrayed Norma Kirkland on the daytime drama Days of Our Lives in 1984–1985.

=== In film ===
Often cast in minor roles in larger budget films, Buckman appeared in the Burt Reynolds vehicles Hooper (1978) and The Cannonball Run (1981).

Buckman also appeared in several b movies from the late-1970s through to the mid-1990s. She appeared in the controversial 1984 horror film Silent Night, Deadly Night. Her most recent major role was as Dr. Julie Casserly in Xtro II: The Second Encounter (1991), and her other credits include the films Snowballing (1984), Never Too Young to Die (1986), Terminal Exposure (1987), Blue Angel Cafe (1989), High Finance Woman (1990), and The Marilyn Diaries (1990) alongside porn star Marilyn Chambers.

== Filmography ==
=== Film ===
Year	Title	Role	Notes
1977	Rollercoaster	Coaster Attendant	
1978	Hooper	Debbie	
1981	The Cannonball Run	Jill	
1984	Silent Night, Deadly Night	Ellie	
1984	Snowballing	Collen	
1986	Never Too Young to Die	Sacrificed Punkette	
1987	Terminal Exposure	Mrs. Stacey Karrothers	
1987	Silent Night, Deadly Night Part 2	Mother	
1989	Blue Angel Cafe	Angie	
1989	Silent Night, Deadly Night 3: Better Watch Out!	Ellie Chapman	Uncredited
1990	Night Killer	Melanie Beck	
1990	High Finance Woman	Brenda	
1990	The Marilyn Diaries	Jane	
1991	Xtro II: The Second Encounter	Dr. Julie Casserly	
1992	Round Trip to Heaven	Phyllis	

=== Television ===
Year	Title	Role	Notes
1977	Kojak	Toni	Episode: "A Strange Kind of Love"
1977	79 Park Avenue	Starlet	3 episodes
1977	Switch	Young Nurse	Episode: "Dancer"
1977	The Rockford Files	Girl	Episode: "The Queen of Peru"
1978	Baretta	Mary	Episode: "I'll Take You to Lunch"
1978	The Hardy Boys/Nancy Drew Mysteries	Bernie Lucas	Episode: "Death Surf"
1978	The Two-Five	Angel	Television film
1978	Sword of Justice	Jill	Episode: "The Skywayman"
1978	Family	Aunt Joanne	Episode: "Just Friends"
1979	Hart to Hart	Sandy	Episode: "Hart to Hart"
1979	Stone	Olivia de Carl	Episode: "Pilot"
1979	Death Car on the Freeway	Jane Guston	Television film
1979	Barnaby Jones	Linda Wolsey	2 episodes
1979	Quincy, M.E.	Terry / Julie Reed	2 episodes
1979	Buck Rogers in the 25th Century	Majel	Episode: "Unchained Woman"
1979	The Man in the Santa Claus Suit	Polly Primer	Television film
1980	Brave New World	Alpha Teacher	Television film
1980–1981	The Misadventures of Sheriff Lobo	Brandy / Sgt. Cummings	16 episodes
1982	CHiPs	Marcie Pendelton	Episode: "Anything But the Truth"
1983	Tales of the Unexpected	Sally Fenton	Episode: "Heir Presumptuous"
1984	The Master	Cat Sinclair	2 episodes
1984	Highway to Heaven	Louella	Episode: "Hotel of Dreams"
1984–1985	Days of Our Lives	Norma Kirkland	23 episodes
1985	T. J. Hooker	Dorothy Unger	Episode: "Love Story"
1987	Spies	Julie Kirkland	Episode: "The Game's Not Over, 'Til the Fat Lady Sings"
1990	Freddy's Nightmares	Brenda Vincent	Episode: "Prisoner of Love"
1990	Mancuso, F.B.I.	Cherry	Episode: "Night of the Living Shred"
1994	Blindfold: Acts of Obsession	Barmaid	Television film
