= Blue Angel Cafe =

- Main promotional art by Enzo Sciotti
- Blue Angel Cafe
- Directed by: Joe D'Amato
- Written by: Daniele Stroppa as Daniel Davis; Laurence Abby
- Starring: Tara Buckman
- Cinematography: Joe D'Amato
- Edited by: Kathleen Stratton
- Music by: Luigi Ceccarelli as Pahamian
- Production company: Filmirage
- Distributed by: Variety Distribution
- Release date: August 18, 1989 (UK)
- Running time: 89 minutes
- Country: Italy

Blue Angel Cafe (Also known as: Object of Desire), is a 1989 Italian erotic film directed by Joe D'Amato.

== Plot ==
United States, late 1980s. When Raymond Derek, a young politician with a great career, a beautiful wife and an expensive home, encounters sexy cabaret singer Angie, he sees his life fall apart because the press finds out and it becomes front-page news.

== Cast ==
- Tara Buckman as Angie
- Richard Brown as Raymond Derek
- Rick Anthony Munroe as William
- Jayne Gray as Kate
- Ken Werbinski as Steve
- Moses Gibson as Butler
- Daniel Smith as Mr. Peterson
- Richard Frank Sume as TV Journalist
- Vera M. Moore as Journalist

== Release ==
The film was released in United Kingdom on August 18, 1989

== Reception ==
In 1991, Video Watchdog called the film a "blasé potboiler" and derided the main character's nightclub act as "consist[ing] of only one boring "I'm-Down-And-Out-But-I'm-Fightin'-Back" number - delivered à la Minnelli in Dietrich duds".

== See also ==
- List of Italian films of 1989
