= Dr. Strange (1978 film) =

1978 film directed by Philip DeGuere

- 1987 VHS cover art
- Genre: Superhero
- Based on: Doctor Strange by: Steve Ditko; Stan Lee
- Written by: Philip DeGuere
- Directed by: Philip DeGuere
- Starring: Peter Hooten; Clyde Kusatsu; Jessica Walter; Eddie Benton; Philip Sterling; John Mills; June Barrett; Sarah Rush
- Music by: Paul Chihara
- Country of origin: United States
- Original language: English

Production
- Producers: Alex Beaton; Philip DeGuere; Gregory Hoblit
- Cinematography: Enzo A. Martinelli
- Editor: Christopher Nelson
- Running time: 93 minutes
- Production company: Universal Television

Original release
- Network: CBS
- Release: September 6, 1978

Dr. Strange is a 1978 American superhero television film based on the Marvel Comics character of the same name, co-created by Steve Ditko and Stan Lee. It was written, co-produced, and directed by Philip DeGuere. It stars Peter Hooten in the title role, along with Jessica Walter, Eddie Benton, Clyde Kusatsu, Philip Sterling, and John Mills. Stan Lee served as a consultant.

The film aired on September 6, 1978, in a two-hour block from 8 pm to 10 pm on CBS, the same network that, at that time, aired The Amazing Spider-Man and The Incredible Hulk. Though originally created as a pilot for a proposed television series, CBS did not pick up Dr. Strange as a series.

== Plot ==
The Nameless One, a powerful demon, tells Morgan le Fay she has been prevented from breaking through to the earthly realm by a great wizard, and that she has three days to defeat the wizard and win over his successor to her master's side.

Le Fay possesses a young woman named Clea Lake and uses her as a weapon against Thomas Lindmer, the "Sorcerer Supreme". She pushes him off a bridge to his death, but he magically heals himself. His assistant, Wong, looks after him and locates Lake. Suffering from nightmares of le Fay, Lake is under the care of psychiatrist Dr. Stephen Strange at a psychiatric hospital. Strange has the potential to become Lindmer's successor through inherited items from his father, including a signet ring. Strange intuitively senses something wrong, sharing Lake's nightmares.

Lindmer contacts Strange at the hospital and tells him Lake needs more help than can be offered by medical science. Strange takes Lindmer's card, which bears the same symbol as his ring. Meanwhile, le Fay possesses a cat and tries to enter Lindmer's house, but magical barriers repel it.

At the hospital, the head of Strange's department sedates Lake, and she slips into a coma. Strange visits Lindmer, and Le Fay declines an opportunity to kill him.

Lindmer tells Strange that his ignorance is a form of protection and asks him whether he wants to know the truth. Strange demands the truth, and Lindmer says he knows about Strange's parents' dying when he was eighteen. He says there are different realms, and that Lake is trapped in them and only Strange can save her. Strange is dispatched to the astral plane and confronts the demon Balzaroth sent by le Fay. Strange and Lake return to the physical world.

The evil entity asks le Fay why she spared Strange. She confesses to being attracted to him, and the demon threatens to turn her into an elderly woman. Strange checks on Lake, and agrees to dinner with her. He goes to see Lindmer and rejects magic. As he leaves, he tries to remove his father's ring and finds he cannot. He accidentally lets the possessed cat in, which allows le Fay to best Wong. She defeats Lindmer and summons Asmodeus to take him to the demon realms.

Strange visits Lake, but le Fay interrupts, promising not to harm Lake if he comes with her to the demon realm. Once there, he appears to be under her command. She attempts to seduce him and asks him to remove his ring, claiming he can do it. He refuses and defeats her, rescues Lindmer, and returns them to the earthly realm, where he also revives Wong. The evil entity transforms le Fay into an old hag.

Lindmer explains that Strange must choose between remaining mortal or becoming the Sorcerer Supreme, forgoing ignorance, offspring, and a painless death. Strange decides to protect humanity, and Lindmer's power is transferred to him. Wong then warns him that, while he now has Lindmer's powers, he does not yet have the knowledge or wisdom to use them correctly, and can harm himself or others.

Strange is then shown at the hospital, where many patients have been discharged. He leaves with Lake, who seems to have no memory of what happened. Le Fay is shown on television, young again, posing as a self-help guru. The film closes with Strange playing a trick on a street magician, turning the flowers the magician was going to produce using sleight-of-hand into a dove.

== Cast ==
- Peter Hooten as Dr. Stephen Strange, a psychiatrist, who becomes the new Sorcerer Supreme to safeguard the Earth from Morgan Le Fay.
- Jessica Walter as Morgan Le Fay, an evil sorceress from the "fourth dimension", who plans to invade Earth.
- Anne-Marie Martin (credited as "Eddie Benton") as Clea Lake, Strange's patient.
- Clyde Kusatsu as Wong
- Philip Sterling as Dr. Frank Taylor
- John Mills as Thomas Lindmer, Dr. Strange's mentor and the original Sorcerer Supreme.
- June Barrett as Sarah
- Sarah Rush as a Nurse
- Diana Webster as the Head Nurse
- Bob Delegall as an Intern
- Larry Anderson as a Magician
- Blake Marion as the Department Chief
- Lady Rowlands as Mrs. Sullivan
- Inez Pedroza as the Announcer
- Michael Clark as a Taxi Driver.
- Frank Catalano as an Orderly.
- David Hooks as the voice of The Nameless One
- Michael Ansara as the voice of Yao/Ancient One
- Ted Cassidy as the voice of the Balzaroth

== Production ==
In 1978, Universal under the direction of executive Frank Price obtained the rights to the Marvel Comics characters Namor the Sub-Mariner, The Human Torch, Hulk, Captain America, and Doctor Strange to develop the properties as potential television projects. Among these, The Human Torch was scrapped due to internal concerns that younger viewers would attempt to mimic the character through self-immolation and Namor the Sub-Mariner was scrapped due to perceived similarities to Man from Atlantis. As for the remaining projects, The Incredible Hulk became an ongoing series, Captain America would serve as the basis for the television films Captain America and Captain America II: Death Too Soon and Doctor Strange would appear in the television film Dr. Strange.

According to director Philip DeGuere, Universal had struck a deal with CBS to do four two-hour TV movies that would serve as backdoor pilots to potential series. DeGuere was relatively inexperienced when he was assigned the film with an aggressive shooting schedule of only 13 days, but deferred to the studio’s insistence that the film could be done in that time. He hoped his time working under Stephen J. Cannell on the series Baa Baa Black Sheep would prepare him for his first television film as a writer and director. Before Dr. Strange was shot, the blockbuster success of Star Wars and the glut of science fiction and fantasy films with heavy visual effects inspired the producers to use more elaborate effects. DeGuere said it was impossible to do with the resources he was provided (describing them as inadequate even for the time) and the overly aggressive shooting schedule caused the production to go over budget. Shooting expanded to 20 days rather than the estimated 13. DeGuere admitted that he acquiesced to network notes and added a large amount of exposition dialogue at their request; he felt the result was overly wordy and a mistake in hindsight. As the character's origins in the 60s were heavily tied into Eastern Mysticism and Gurus, DeGuere found it challenging to translate the concepts of the comic and a character that seemed hackneyed and hollow in the following decade. DeGuere says instead of going for a direct translation from the comic, he wanted to translate the metaphysical themes and ideas in a more approachable way similar to the television series Kung Fu which is why he opted to avoid elements like the Eye of Agamotto or Dormammu which resisted translation within his budget.

The film was shot on Universal sets in Los Angeles, going over-schedule by several days because of the special effects, which included a lot of the era's green screen. DeGuere's friend, composer Paul Chiraha, was encouraged to produce an electronic score. Chihara, interviewed in 2016, said that DeGuere had high hopes for the film, and that he was crushed when it "tanked" in the Nielsen ratings.

In March 1985, Stan Lee recounted the largely positive experience of working on Dr. Strange, compared with the other live-action Marvel Comics adaptations under the publisher's development deal with CBS and Universal in the late 1970s:

I probably had the most input into that one. I've become good friends with the writer/producer Phil DeGuere. I was pleased with Dr. Strange and The Incredible Hulk. I think that Dr. Strange would have done much better than it did in the ratings, except that it aired opposite Roots. Those are the only experiences I've had with live-action television. Dr. Strange and The Incredible Hulk were fine. Captain America was a bit [of a] disappointment, and Spider-Man was a total nightmare.

== Reception ==
Dr. Strange got very low Nielsen ratings and generally negative reviews from critics:

- Kieran Shiach and Elle Collins called it a bad film and suggested that this was the reason CBS did not pick up the series, saying that "it struggles under its origins, and not much happens over the course of ninety minutes".
- Mike Ryan found the film "boring", complaining that the first two-thirds of the film played like a medical procedural.
- Scott Beggs defended the film but conceded that it was slow-moving, lacking any sense of urgency, or indeed much going for the titular character, as Strange was a bit of a "Gary Stu" in the film: "He's instantly good at everything without any training, only fails once before miraculously being awesome immediately afterwards, and he's just generally an idiot. He's also barely there as a figure".
- Aaron Couch called the film an "ambitious shoot" whose effects were "campy by today's standards", but described the acting as "wonderfully committed performances".

== Home media ==
The film was released twice on VHS in the United States, in 1987 and 1995, and also had multiple foreign releases. Dr. Strange was released on DVD for the first time in the United States and Canada on November 1, 2016, and on Blu-ray for a limited time on April 26, 2022, by Shout! Factory.
