= Med Flory =

- Publicity Photo of Med Flory

Background information
- Born: Meredith Irwin Flory; August 27, 1926; Logansport, Indiana, U.S.
- Died: March 12, 2014 (aged 87) North Hollywood, Los Angeles, California, U.S.
- Genre: Jazz
- Occupations: Musician, actor, screenwriter
- Instrument: Saxophone
- Spouse: Joan Barbara Fry (died 2000)

Meredith Irwin Flory, known professionally as Med Flory (August 27, 1926 – March 12, 2014), was an American jazz saxophonist, bandleader, and actor.

== Early years ==
Flory was born in Logansport, Indiana, United States. His mother was an organist and encouraged him to learn clarinet as a child. During World War II, he was an Army Air Force pilot, and after the war he received his college degree in philosophy from Indiana University.

== Career ==
Flory played in the bands of Claude Thornhill and Woody Herman in the early 1950s, before forming his own ensemble in New York City. In 1955, he relocated to California and started a new group, which played at the 1958 Monterey Jazz Festival. In the late 1950s, he played with Terry Gibbs, Art Pepper, and Herman again, playing both tenor and baritone saxophone. He was cast in twenty-nine episodes from 1956 to 1957 of the ABC variety show, The Ray Anthony Show.

In the 1960s, Flory was less active in music, working in television and film as an actor and screenwriter; his credits include Wagon Train; The Rifleman; Ripcord (twice); Rawhide (twice); Gunsmoke (twice); Perry Mason (twice - including 'The Case of Crying Comedian'); Maverick (twice); The Virginian (five episodes); Route 66 (twice); Bronco; Surfside 6; Mona McCluskey; Run, Buddy, Run; 77 Sunset Strip (three episodes); The Dakotas; Destry; Lawman (three episodes); Wendy and Me; It's a Man's World; The Monroes; Cimarron Strip; Daniel Boone (seven episodes); Gomer Pyle - U.S.M.C. (twice); Bonanza (three episodes); Mannix; Lassie (ten episodes); How the West Was Won (three episodes); and High Mountain Rangers (four episodes as Sheriff Mike McBride). He appeared in the films The Gumball Rally, The Night of the Grizzly, and The Nutty Professor.

In the mid-1960s Flory worked with Art Pepper and Joe Maini on transcriptions and arrangements of Charlie Parker recordings. In 1972, he co-founded Supersax, an ensemble devoted to Parker's work. Supersax's debut album, Supersax Plays Bird, won a Grammy Award.

== Personal life ==
Flory was married to Joan Barbara Fry until her death in 2000.

== Death ==
Flory died of a heart ailment on March 12, 2014, in Hollywood, California, at the age of 87.

== Filmography ==
- Gun Street (1961) - Willie Driscoll
- Spencer's Mountain (1963) - Spencer Brother (uncredited)
- The Nutty Professor (1963) - Warzewski
- Move Over, Darling (1963) - Seaman (uncredited)
- Man's Favorite Sport? (1964) - Tucker (uncredited)
- Mike and the Mermaid (1964) - Dad
- The Night of the Grizzly (1966) - Duke Squires
- Doctor, You've Got to Be Kidding! (1967) - Policeman
- The Reluctant Astronaut (1967) - White Shirt in Bar (uncredited)
- Rough Night in Jericho (1967) - Weaver (uncredited)
- The Big Mouth (1967) - Male Nurse (uncredited)
- The Trouble with Girls (1969) - Constable
- Which Way to the Front? (1970) - G.I. Sentry (uncredited)
- Suppose They Gave a War and Nobody Came (1970) - Military Policeman (uncredited)
- Home for the Holidays (1972) - Sheriff Nolan
- The Teacher (1974) - Joe Roberts
- Let's Do It Again (1975) - Rufus
- Hustle (1975) - Albino-Beating Cop
- The Gumball Rally (1976) - Officer Williams
- Uncle Joe Shannon (1978) - Humphreys / Shannon's Musicians - Keyboard
- The Hearse (1980) - Sheriff Denton
- The Boogens (1981) - Dan Ostroff
