= Rebecca Balding =

American actress (1948–2022)

- Born: September 21, 1948; Little Rock, Arkansas, U.S.
- Died: July 18, 2022 (aged 73); Park City, Utah, U.S.
- Occupation: Actress
- Years active: 1976–2006

Rebecca Balding (September 21, 1948 – July 18, 2022) was an American actress best known for her appearances on Soap and Charmed.

== Biography ==
In 1948, Balding was born in Little Rock, Arkansas. She attended the University of Kansas.

In 1977, Balding starred as the original female reporter Carla Mardigian during the first three episodes of the inaugural season of the drama series Lou Grant, starring Ed Asner, before that character was written out for a different female reporter. That same year, she again appeared with Asner, playing his daughter Julie, in the classic Christmas TV film The Gathering (1977). Also in 1977, Balding played Amy Franklin in Deadly Game, a movie that starred Andy Griffith and James Cromwell.

Balding had the role of Carol David, mother of Jodie Dallas' child, on Soap, appearing in 19 episodes from 1978 through 1980.

In 1979, Balding played Corky Crandall in the sitcom Makin' It.

In 1980, Balding starred in the pilot of the sitcom Mr. and Mrs. and Mr., but the series was not picked up.

Balding was married to television producer James L. Conway, whom she met while auditioning for a part in the horror movie The Boogens (1981), which Conway directed, and in which Balding ultimately starred.

In 1996, Balding made a guest appearance on 7th Heaven as Ellen, the mother of Matt's new girlfriend Tia.

In 1998, Balding guest starred as Aunt Jackie in the season one episode "The Fourth Sister" of Charmed. She later returned to the show during its fourth season in 2002 under a different role. Balding played the recurring character Elise Rothman, a newspaper editor-in-chief and the boss of Phoebe Halliwell (played by Alyssa Milano). She played the role until the show's eighth and final season in 2006.

On July 18, 2022, Balding died in Park City, Utah, at the age of 73, after having suffered from ovarian cancer.

== Filmography ==
=== Film ===
Year	Title	Role	Notes
1979	The Silent Scream	Scotty Parker	
1981	The Boogens	Trish Michaels	
1983	Kiss My Grits	Doris Ann	
2005	Yesterday's Dream	Mrs. Woodward	

=== Television ===
Year	Title	Role	Notes
1976	The Bionic Woman	Parker	"Jaime's Shield: Parts 1 & 2"
1976	Starsky & Hutch	Officer Perkowitz	"Little Girl Lost"
1977	Lou Grant	Carla Mardigian	"Cophouse", "Hostages", "Hoax"
1977	Deadly Game	Amy Franklin	TV film
1977	The Gathering	Julie	TV film
1978	Starsky & Hutch	Mickie Marra	"Class in Crime"
1978	Barnaby Jones	Maggie Revell	"Prime Target"
1978	The Rockford Files	Carol Lansing	"Dwarf in a Helium Hat"
1978–80	Soap	Carol David	Recurring role, 19 episodes
1979	The French Atlantic Affair	Harriet Kleinfeld	TV miniseries
1979	Makin' It	Corky Crandall	Main role
1979	Supertrain	Ellen Bradford	"The Green Girl"
1979	Insight	Gally	"Checkmate"
1979	The Gathering, Part II	Julie	TV film
1980	Mr. and Mrs. and Mr.	Widow	TV film
1981	I'm a Big Girl Now	Judy	"Best Friends"
1983	Cagney & Lacey	Sonia Maltese	"Burn Out"
1983	Hotel	Penny Domenico	"Flashback"
1983	Matt Houston	Nan Kimball	"The Woman in White"
1984	Matt Houston	Sarah	"Apostle of Death"
1984	Gimme a Break!	Wendy	"Herbie"
1984	The Mississippi	Deborah	"Home Again"
1984	Family Ties	Karen Banks	"Working at It"
1985	MacGruder and Loud	Sandy	"Tarnished Blues"
1985	Brothers	Janey Waters	"It Ain't Over Til It's Over"
1985	Trapper John, M.D.	Anna Tinker	"Billboard Barney"
1986	The Fall Guy	Sandra Andrews	"The Lucky Stiff"
1987	Our House	Gale Witherspoon	"Past Tense, Future Tense: Parts 1 & 2"
1987	MacGyver	Susan Walker	"Back from the Dead"
1989	The Robert Guillaume Show	Jenny	"First Date"
1989-90	Paradise	Mary McBride	Recurring role
1990	Free Spirit	Meg Snyder	"We Gotta Be Me"
1990	Designing Women	Melinda	"And Now, Here's Bernice"
1992	Bodies of Evidence	Karen Turner	"Echoes in the Dark"
1993	Home Improvement	Leslie Morrison	"Feud for Thought"
1995	University Hospital	Nancy Reynolds	"Shadow of a Doubt"
1996	7th Heaven	Ellen Jackson	"Now You See Me"
1997	Beverly Hills, 90210	Jill Abernathy	"Toil and Trouble", "Deadline"
1998	Melrose Place	Nora Larner	"M.P. Confidential", "The Nasty Minded Professor"
1998	Beyond Belief: Fact or Fiction	Gwen Chandler	"Bon Voyage"
1998–2006	Charmed	Aunt Jackie/Elise Rothman	Recurring role, 23 episodes
1999	Love Boat: The Next Wave	Ms. Leigh	"About Face"
2000	ER	Ms. Garvey	"Mars Attacks"
