= Death Car on the Freeway =

- Print ad
- Genre: Mystery; Thriller
- Written by: William Wood
- Directed by: Hal Needham
- Starring: George Hamilton; Shelley Hack; Abe Vigoda; Dinah Shore; Peter Graves; Harriet Nelson
- Music by: Richard Markowitz
- Country of origin: United States
- Original language: English

Production
- Producer: Stanley Shpetner
- Production location: Los Angeles
- Cinematography: Bobby Byrne
- Editor: Frank Morriss
- Running time: 91 minutes
- Production company: The Shpetner Company

Original release
- Network: CBS
- Release: September 25, 1979

Death Car on the Freeway is a 1979 American made-for-television crime thriller film starring Shelley Hack. In a plot similar to Steven Spielberg's Duel, this tells the story of an unseen driver who is dubbed "The Freeway Fiddler".

The cast features several TV veterans, including George Hamilton, Frank Gorshin, Peter Graves, Dinah Shore, Harriet Nelson, Barbara Rush and Abe Vigoda. Director Hal Needham, himself an experienced car action director and stuntman, appears in a supporting role. The face of The Freeway Fiddler is never shown, and none of the stunt drivers who portrayed him are credited for the role. Death Car on the Freeway first aired on CBS television on September 25, 1979 (presented as the CBS Tuesday Night Movie).

== Plot ==
Becky Lyons is an aspiring actress who has a casting call for an episode of Barnaby Jones. On the way there, though, she is cut off by a mysterious driver in a dark blue van who attempts to run her off the road. Broadcast journalist Janette “Jan” Clausen suspects that this may be related to a similar case in which businesswoman Lynn Bernheimer was run off the road a couple of months ago, based on watching a tape loaned to her by her husband Ray Jeffries, with whom she used to work for at a rival news station and has now separated from. Jan speaks to Lieutenant Haller of the LAPD, who refuses to investigate the case because she has no more than a mere feeling about the driver.

In the meantime, a nurse named Jane Guston has a run-in with the driver, who causes her to have a fiery crash that causes burns on 60% of her body. Jan speaks with Guston, who mentions that there was a sort of country music coming from the van with a fiddle sound to it. Intrigued, Jan attempts to call Lynn back, but she is meeting with some important people at the moment and tells Jan to call back later. Jan attempts to call Becky, but only gets her machine, so she leaves a message, only to find out that the hospital staff has informed Guston’s boyfriend that she died of her injuries. Later that night, Ray drives Jan home, and it is apparent that from an earlier call that Becky didn’t hear any music coming from the mysterious van. However, when Jan enters her house, she gets a call from Lynn, who not only apologizes for her earlier brusqueness, but confirms that she did indeed hear fiddle music coming from the van. Because of this, the driver turned killer is dubbed the “Freeway Fiddler” by the media.

With the Fiddler continuing to kill, the LAPD, LASD and CHP form a joint “Fiddler Task Force” headed by Haller. Undeterred, Jan makes a public proclamation on the air that she will continue driving alone on the freeway regardless of what the Fiddler thinks. Unbeknownst to anyone, the Fiddler has repainted his van gray and changed the license plates. Despite having lost the chance to break the Fiddler story first, Jan pursues it aggressively, interviewing psychologist Dr. Rita Glass about the Fiddler’s psychological profile. Additionally, having been contacted by a Mr. Blanchard, who runs a defensive driving school, Jan decides to run a series of newscasts on the matter. In the meantime, she also runs a story blaming the way the American automotive industry advertises their vehicles for encouraging the Fiddler’s behavior.

While Jan continues her courses at Mr. Blanchard’s school, the Fiddler continues to kill, this time killing a Mrs. Anthony on her way to pick up her son from school and also wrecking a couple of police cars. With ten women having been victimized by the Fiddler, Lieutenant Haller blames the victims themselves for their circumstances, citing the traffic violations they’ve committed. Later that night, Jan suspects someone is stalking her, but it’s only Ray, who congratulates her for climbing to the top of the ratings, but also warns her of the potential consequences. However, Jan is undeterred and feels like he’s jealous of her success.

While finishing up her courses at Mr. Blanchard’s driving school, Jan speaks with a coworker of hers named Rosemary, who is going on vacation in Arizona and is looking to have her substitute as anchor for the six o’clock news. However, another coworker of hers, Ralph Chandler, warns her of a rumor going around that she will be let go if she continues reporting on the Fiddler the way she has been due to automakers’ hesitance to advertise on KXLA. In the meantime, Ray invites Jan to lunch and offers to give her her old job back at his station, but she refuses and takes on the automotive industry in another story about the Fiddler, claiming that more Americans have been killed in motor vehicle accidents than all the wars that America has ever fought in.

Having lost her job at KXLA, Jan is once again accosted by Ray, and once again, she refuses to work with him. In the meantime, she gets a call from an anonymous source claiming to have information about the Fiddler – a man known only as “John” – and asks her to meet him at a building next door to a local muffler shop. Jan is worried because of the general disrepute of the area, but the man who phoned her – a man named Bobby, who is a member of a car club called the “Street Phantoms” – treats her well enough. He explains that the Phantoms are a social club, that they merely use their cars for racing and that they have good relations with the police. The man known as the Fiddler, however, was an antisocial type whom the club refers to as a “roach”, that all he did was obsess over his van and play bluegrass music. Another club member named Ed hands her a magazine with the Fiddler’s real name on it: John Evans, of La Crescenta.

Jan visits the address where John Evans is supposed to live, but only finds an old lady there named Helen Sheel, who is not only blind, but also the landlord of the place. According to her, John rarely used the room that she rented to him and mostly preferred to spend time in his van. She allows Jan to borrow the key to the room, and when Jan enters, she finds numerous pictures of cars in addition to news clippings about the Fiddler. She alerts Lieutenant Haller, who thanks her for her efforts. Then, John decides to target Jan, toying with her at first before deciding to attack her vehicle. However, she leads him to a section of highway still under construction and uses a handbrake turn maneuver that she learned to evade him. John is not as lucky, and dies when his van drives off the unfinished highway in a fiery crash, foreshadowed by the paint job on his car.

== Cast ==
- Shelley Hack as Jan Claussen
- Peter Graves as Lieutenant Haller
- Frank Gorshin as Ralph Chandler
- George Hamilton as Ray Jeffries
- Harriet Nelson as Helen Sheel
- Barbara Rush as Rosemary
- Dinah Shore as Lynn Bernheimer
- Abe Vigoda as Mr. Frisch
- Alfie Wise as Ace Durham
- Robert F. Lyons as Barry Hill
- Tara Buckman as Jane Guston
- Morgan Brittany as Becky Lyons
- Nancy Stephens as Christine
- Gloria Stroock as Dr. Rita Glass
- Hal Needham as Mr. Blanchard

== Trivia ==
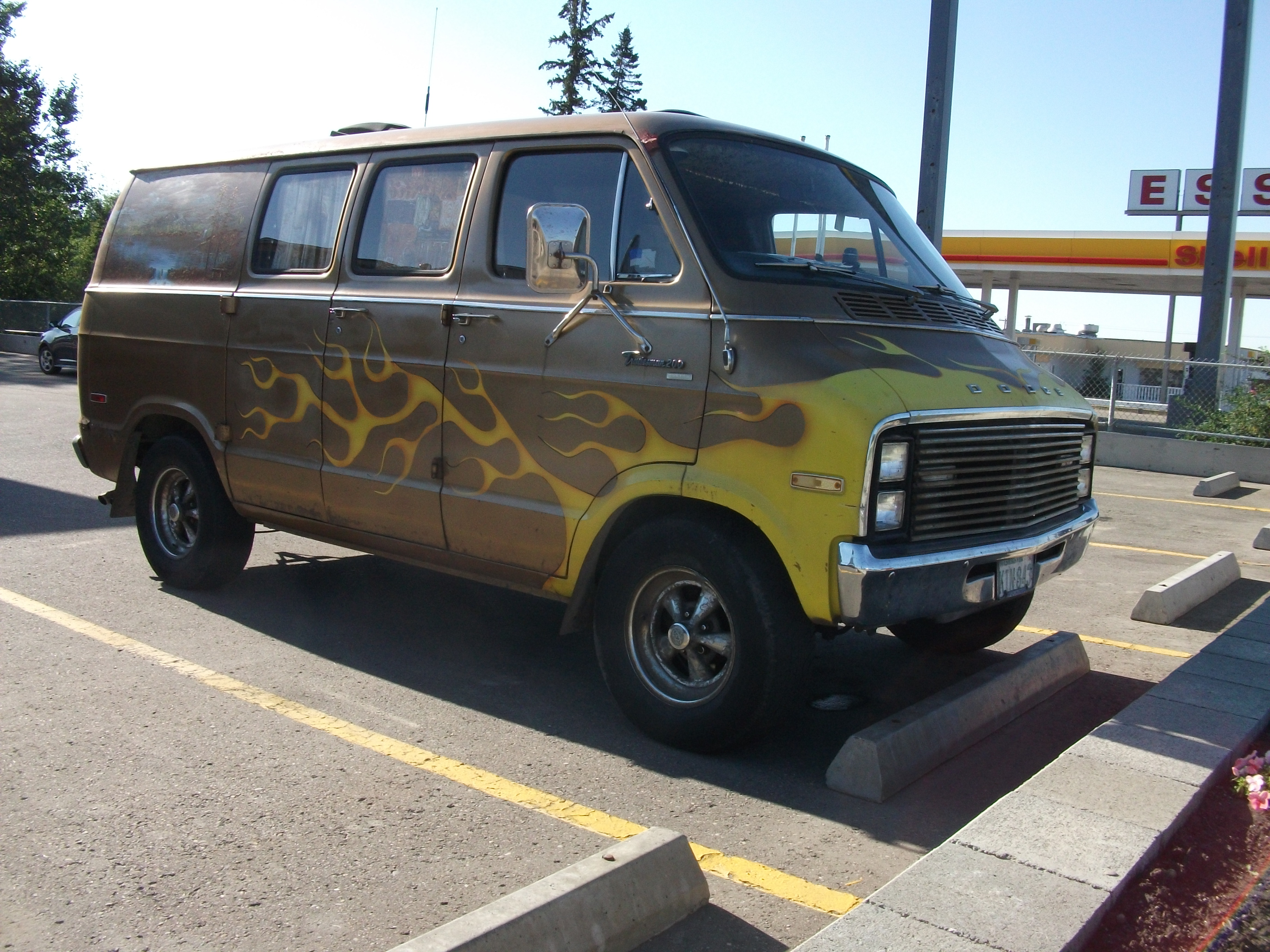
Customised Dodge Tradesman 200 with hot rod-style flame decoration, possibly inspired by the film's final iteration of the vehicle.

The Fiddler drives a Dodge Tradesman 200 and plays the music from a dashmounted 8-track cartridge player.
