= The Boogens =

- Theatrical release poster
- Directed by: James L. Conway
- Written by: David O'Malley; Jim Kouf (as Bob Hunt)
- Produced by: Charles E. Sellier Jr.
- Starring: Rebecca Balding; Fred McCarren; Anne-Marie Martin; Jeff Harlan; John Crawford; Med Flory; Jon Lormer; Scott Wilkinson
- Cinematography: Paul Hipp
- Edited by: Michael Spence
- Music by: Bob Summers
- Production company: Taft International Pictures
- Distributed by: Jensen Farley Pictures
- Release date: September 25, 1981
- Running time: 95 minutes
- Country: United States
- Language: English
- Budget: $600,000
- Box office: $3 million

The Boogens is a 1981 American monster film directed by James L. Conway and starring Rebecca Balding, Fred McCarren, Anne-Marie Martin, Jeff Harlan, John Crawford, Med Flory, Jon Lormer, and Scott Wilkinson. The title refers to scaly turtle-like monsters that are released from an abandoned and boarded-up silver mine, and begin to wreak havoc.

== Plot ==
A small construction team of four men work to reopen an abandoned silver mine, in a Colorado town, 100 years after a mysterious massacre forced the military to shut it down. What they don't know is that their excavating has inadvertently freed some predatory creatures (cross between a turtle and a spider) lurking deep within the mine shafts. The reptilian creatures are known as the Boogens. These creatures have been dormant for centuries and are now hungry for human flesh.

As the Boogens start attacking the townspeople, a group of friends becomes trapped in the mine. They must find a way to survive and escape while facing the relentless and deadly creatures.

== Cast ==
- Rebecca Balding as Trish Michaels
- Fred McCarren as Mark Kinner
- Anne-Marie Martin as Jessica Ford
- Jeff Harlan as Roger Lowrie
- John Crawford as Brian Deering
- Med Flory as Dan Ostroff
- Jon Lormer as Blanchard
- Scott Wilkinson as Deputy Greenwalt

== Production ==
The Boogens was produced by Charles E. Sellier Jr. and Bill Cornfold, and written by Thomas C. Chapman, David O'Malley and Jim Kouf (as Bob Hunt).

Parts of the film were shot in Park City, Kamas, Ontario Mine, Mayflower Mine, and Heber in Utah.

== Release ==
The Boogens opened in US theaters on September 25, 1981, distributed by independent outfit Jensen Farley Pictures.

=== Home media ===
The film was released on VHS by Republic Pictures in 1997. It was released on DVD and Blu-ray by Olive Films (under license from Paramount Home Entertainment) on August 7, 2012. The film received a 4k Blu-ray release from Kino Lorber in January 2024.

== Reception ==
On aggregator website Rotten Tomatoes, The Boogens holds a 25% approval rating, with a rating average of 4.7 based on eight reviews.

TV Guide gave it 1 out of 5 stars, criticizing the film's incoherent plot. Dennis Schwartz of Ozus' World Movie Reviews gave the film a grade C+, stating, "At best, it's a so-so horror pic".

Brett Gallman from Oh, the Horror! gave the film a positive review, writing, "A charming little homespun monster movie, it's a far cry from many of its gooey, splattery contemporaries, and it's armed with a solid cast that makes it personable in the absence of an abundance of on-screen carnage. All told, a pretty good flick was mined from the old monster movie standard". The A.V. Club critic Keith Phipps described the film as "charmingly clunky", and said that it "plays like a cross between the then-omnipresent slasher films and a '50s monster movie". Diabolique critic Samm Deighan called it "a charming, if sedate mishmash of horror genres and tropes", but praised the acting, saying that "The Boogens' small, intimate cast is surprisingly solid, and its characters are likable", and that "despite the low budget, the sets and effects are solid".

The film notably received a positive review from author Stephen King in The Twilight Zone Magazine.
