= How to Pick Up Girls! =

1978 television film by Mick Jackson and Bill Persky

- Promotional poster
- Genre: Comedy
- Based on: How to Pick Up Girls! by Eric Weber
- Written by: Jordan Crittenden; Peter Gethers; David Handler; Bill Persky
- Directed by: Mick Jackson; Bill Persky
- Starring: Desi Arnaz Jr. Bess Armstrong; Fred McCarren
- Music by: Don Sebesky
- Country of origin: United States
- Original language: English

Production
- Executive producer: Alan King
- Producer: Rupert Hitzig
- Cinematography: Alan Metzger
- Editor: Craig McKay
- Running time: 100 minutes
- Production company: King-Hitzig Productions

Original release
- Network: ABC
- Release: November 3, 1978

How to Pick Up Girls! is a 1978 American comedy television film directed by Mick Jackson and Bill Persky, starring Desi Arnaz Jr., Bess Armstrong, and Fred McCarren. It was shot on location in New York City.

Based loosely on the 1968 best-selling book of the same title by author Eric Weber, the film premiered on ABC on November 3, 1978.

== Plot ==
Donald Becker (McCarren) moves to Manhattan from Grand Island, Nebraska, after an abrupt breakup of a three-year relationship. Robby Harrington, (Arnaz) Becker's childhood chum, had been living in New York for years and invites Donald out for a change of pace, and secures him employment and to hone his photography skills with seasoned model photographer Chandler Corey (Richard Dawson). On Donald's arrival to the Big Apple his innocence is exploited as a man attempts to steal his luggage outside of the telephone booth. Co-Producer Alan King makes a cameo as a cabbie Manny Shiller and scares away the thief and bestows some much-needed knowledge to the guileless Becker. While taking a break from being in a relationship, Donald cannot help but notice the dozens of beautiful young women New York has to offer in the swinging seventies. But Becker's swing needs a big push to get off the ground, yet he finds friendship in the company of Sally Claybrook (Armstrong) who is currently in an off-and-on relationship (presently off) with married man Frank Cavanaugh (Rudolph Willrich).

Upon arriving at Harrington's apartment, (413 E 68th street) Becker cannot get in and valiantly tries to gain entrance without a key or knowledge of new fellow tenants. Donald buzzes the residence of Cavanaugh/ Claybrook and serenades Sally with On the Banks of the Wabash, Far Away and still fails. When Donald finally gets into the apartment he's surprised to the stunning glamour of Harrington's playmate and his promiscuous attitudes. Robby tries to update Donald's fashion and confidence to the New York lifestyle in a trendy fashion store where they meet Pam (Fobesy Russell) and Denise (Hollis Winick). Denise eventually ends up in bed with Pam and Harrington, and Becker sadly walks the streets wearing his new ensemble but quickly reconfirms that this is not who he really is, as he sees a mannequin in the window wearing the very same clothing articles. As Becker states in a bar with Claybrook "I look like a runner-up in a John Travolta look-a-like contest".

The bar scene is a pivotal point in the film as Sally shares a recording of an on the spot interview with Howard Cosell, and inspires Donald by saying, "You know anybody will talk to you with a tape recorder in your hand, it makes you look like you know what you're actually doing." The Cosell interview is for Sally's thesis on pop art and its relationship to society. Donald meets Terry (Denise Flamino), a gorgeous young woman in the bar, grips the tape recorder and microphone and tries Claybrook's technique and gets her number. This bumps up Donald's confidence and he courageously goes to the source on what makes women tick, and the best way to approach them. Unfortunately this confidence ultimately blinds Becker as he swoons Cynthia Miller (Deborah Raffin), an alluring model and girlfriend of his employer (Chandler Cory) of four years. When Donald informs Robby of his dinner date, Harrington tells him, "That's terrific I'm very proud of you, you're making great progress, now break the date, is it worth your job?" Becker responds, "It's worth my life!" Donald calls from Studio 54, to tell Robby how well it's going, Harrington tries his best to stop Donald from going any further, but to no avail, the two hit the dance floor in a spectacular liveliness which really defines the New York Disco scene.

Donald has the best night of his life, then has the worst day when Chandler humiliates Becker while firing him. Donald takes to the hubs to record audio for his book on how to pick up girls, even though both Sally and Robby discourage him from doing it. In the midst of Becker getting more material for his book he sees Claybrook infuriatingly leave the apartment exclaiming, "I'm a failure and a fraud" because the notes for her thesis are just culminating with no signs of fruition. Donald takes her apartment key from her secret spot (a humble loose bannister knob) and organizes the archives and bestows all the credit to Max, her dog who isn't the best watchdog. Sally invites Donald up to the roof for a surprise picnic, Donald having undeniable romantic feelings for Sally, and he believing they're mutual, he finally pushes to know what's the story between her and Cavanaugh. While finishing the typing of "The End" of his book, Sally hysterically knocks on the door with wine and flutes to celebrate the triumph of her thesis. The two end up spirited by the wine singing "On the Banks of the Wabash, Far Away", the very song which introduced the two. Donald makes a move on Claybrook, and the two become an item.

With multiple manuscript rejections and red wine to soften the fall, Claybrook cheers up Becker by scratching off Cavanaugh's name from the mail box. Donald receives a letter to meet with Dana Greenberg, editor (Polly Bergen) and throws oil on the fire by assuming Dana Greenberg is a man, believing only a man would be interested in his book. Ms. Greenberg hated the book and only sent the letter to personally insult and reject Donald. Sally cheers up Donald by singing "The Sons of Nebraska" (an old collegiate football fight song), then introduces Donald to a printer by the name of Nathan Perlmutter (Abe Vigoda) who begins sentences with "Based on my experience" and instructs Becker on taking ads out in magazines to bring his book exposure, then getting the orders for the books first, then printing them. Perlmutter instructs the two not to go to the post office for a week. Yet every day the two meet at the post office only to witness lint in the box. On the day the rent is due on the p.o. box, Donald asks Sally if he could go alone. Donald receives a note to report to the postal carrier, and is reprimanded on having his mail pile up. As excited as Donald is to announce the news to Sally's door, that jubilation is halted as Frank Cavanaugh opens the door, making things difficult and complicated between the two as Donald cannot fully celebrate his success with Sally. Becker's star keeps climbing as press and beautiful women clamor for him, even the venomous Dana Greenberg sees Donald's book and stardom skyrocket, and decides to gain a reprieve with him. Soon enough Harrington and Becker's apartment become too crowded with overstock of his book, Donald seeks a more suitable abode to complement his successful jet-set lifestyle and his best friend Robby. With all of his success, he still sulks and wishes things with Claybrook worked out. While back at the old apartment Donald stands in the center of a maze of boxes packing his book in envelopes, Sally comes to tell him that she's leaving to Chicago for good with Frank Cavanaugh. She gets a cold and unfeeling "goodbye" from Donald and the two get into an argument that has Sally storming off, toppling the maze of boxes.

Donald visits with Dana Greenberg to discuss the paperback right to his book, once again she insults his book while insisting he be a spokesman on "swinging singles" "the definitive expert on picking up girls". Donald insists his book is not silly and he couldn't be spokesman for anything, "I didn't write this book for swinging singles, they don't need one. I wrote this book about loneliness and how to find somebody". During the meeting Donald realizes that he's done being petty with the Cavanaugh/ Claybrook situation and wants to profess his undying love for Sally, by telling Greenberg, "You know I suddenly have a yen for frozen yogurt" (the celebratory meal Sally and Donald shared when their success came together). Donald races through security at the airport but it's too late, as he sees Claybrook's airplane pulling away from the terminal. Sad and dismayed Donald accepts the truth and heads back to his new apartment to find Sally and her luggage in the outside patio. The two innocently converse about things. Sally says, "A lot of the old stuff went away today." Donald asks, "For good?" Sally responds, "For very good."

== Cast ==
- Desi Arnaz Jr. as Robby Harrington
- Bess Armstrong as Sally Claybrook
- Fred McCarren as Donald Becker
- Polly Bergen as Dana Greenberg
- Richard Dawson as Chandler Corey
- Alan King as Manny Shiller
- Abe Vigoda as Nathan Perlmutter
- Deborah Raffin as Cynthia Miller
- Rudolph Willrich as Frank Cavanaugh
- Forbesy Russell as Pam
- Hollis Winick as Denise
- Sandahl Bergman as Blond jogger
- Collette Blonigan as Suzie
- Jon Bruno as Store Clerk
- International Chrysis as Donnie
- Kevin Conroy as Bartender
- McIntyre Dixon as Post Office Clerk
- Denise Flamino as Terry
- Wendie Malick as Stephie
- Troy Martin as Passenger
- Shelley Wyant as Cloakroom Attendant
