= James Luisi =

American actor (1928–2002)

- Luisi in 1977
- Born: November 2, 1928; East Harlem, Manhattan, New York City, U.S.
- Died: June 7, 2002 (aged 73); Los Angeles, California, United States
- Other name: Jim Luisi
- Occupations: Former NBA player, actor
- Years active: 1961–1999
- Spouse: Georgia Phillips (1961–2002)
- Children: 1

James Anthony Luisi (November 2, 1928 – June 7, 2002) was an American professional basketball player and actor. Luisi is perhaps best known for his role as Lt. Doug Chapman, the apoplectic foil to detective Jim Rockford, in a total of 23 episodes during Seasons 3 through 6 of the television series The Rockford Files.

== Basketball career ==
Born in East Harlem, New York City, Luisi attended St. Francis College on a basketball scholarship before being drafted by the Boston Celtics in the sixth round of the 1951 NBA draft. After serving in the US Army during the Korean War, he played with the Baltimore Bullets for one year in the 1953–54 season. At 6 ft 2 in (1.88 m) and 180 pounds (82 kg), he played guard for 31 games and averaged 3 points a game.

=== Career statistics ===
Legend
GP	Games played	FGM	Field-goals made
FG%	Field-goal percentage	FTM	Free-throws made
FTA	Free-throws attempted	FT%	Free-throw percentage
RPG	Rebounds per game	APG	Assists per game
PTS	Points	PPG	Points per game
**Bold**	Career high

==== College ====
College statistics
Year	Team	GP	FGM	FTM	FTA	FT%	PTS	PPG
1948–49	St. Francis	**30**	34	36	74	.486	104	3.5
1949–50	St. Francis	27	131	**134**	**202**	**.663**	396	**14.7**
1950–51	St. Francis	**30**	**158**	123	188	.654	**439**	14.6
Career		87	323	293	464	.631	939	10.8

==== NBA ====
===== Regular season =====
Year	Team	GP	MPG	FG%	FT%	RPG	APG	PPG
1953–54	Baltimore	31	11.8	.326	.659	.8	1.1	2.9

== Stage ==
Luisi then attended the American Academy of Dramatic Arts, and appeared on Broadway in productions of Alfie and Do I Hear a Waltz? as well as the original 1966 production of Sweet Charity.

== Television and movies ==
From 1961 to the mid-1970s Luisi appeared on such television shows as Naked City, The Rifleman, The Doctors (5 episodes), Bonanza (2 episodes), The F.B.I. (2 different roles in 2 episodes), Adam-12, Kojak (2 roles in a total of 3 episodes), Cannon, Police Story (2 roles in a total of 3 episodes), The Rookies (2 roles in 2 episodes), Mannix (2 roles in 2 episodes), Ironside, Barnaby Jones (5 roles in 5 episodes), The Streets of San Francisco, Gunsmoke (2 episodes), Hawkins, Vega$, Chopper One and S.W.A.T.

In 1976 Luisi had a guest role as a shady businessman on a Season 2 episode of The Rockford Files. The next season on the same show he portrayed Lt. Doug Chapman, a high-ranking, disagreeable police officer who dislikes the titular character portrayed by James Garner. Luisi ultimately played Chapman in 23 episodes, until the end of the show's six-year run. He reprised the role in two Rockford TV movies in 1996.

In 1976, Luisi shared a Daytime Emmy Award for Outstanding Actor in a Daytime Drama Special for his portrayal of George Washington in the 1975 miniseries First Ladies Diaries: Martha Washington.

Also in 1976 he appeared on The Mary Tyler Moore Show episode titled "Sue Ann Falls In Love". He subsequently had guest roles in Starsky and Hutch; Black Sheep Squadron; Hunter (2 episodes); Wonder Woman; Fantasy Island; Quincy, M.E. and Buck Rogers in the 25th Century.

During the 1980s Luisi guest starred on such television staples as CHiPs, Vega$; Hart to Hart (in 2 episodes); The A-Team; Knight Rider; T. J. Hooker; Matt Houston; The Fall Guy; Simon & Simon; Magnum, P.I.; Knots Landing (the same role in 4 episodes) and It's a Living. In 1987 and 1988 he appeared as Ben Clark in 23 episodes of the soap opera Santa Barbara. From 1987 to 1992 he appeared as Duke Earl Johnson in 21 episodes of Days of Our Lives.

Luisi appeared in the studio films Ben (1972), I Escaped from Devil's Island (1973), The Man from Independence (1974), The Take (1974), Stunts (1977), Killer's Delight (1978), Moment by Moment (1978), Norma Rae (1979), Fade to Black (1980), Star 80 (1983), Murphy's Law (1986), The Hidden (1987), Feds (1987), Lethal Woman (1987) and Wanted (1998).

He also appeared in the made-for-television movies Cat Ballou (1971), Cry Rape (1973), Honky Tonk (1974), Don't Call Us (1976), The Cabot Connection (1977), A Love Affair: The Eleanor and Lou Gehrig Story (1977), Contract on Cherry Street (1977), Love Is Not Enough (1978), One in a Million: The Ron LeFlore Story (1978), The Asphalt Cowboy (1980), Our Family Business (1981), The Renegades (1982), Sunset Limousine (1983) and The Red-Light Sting (1984).

== Death ==
Luisi died of cancer in 2002, aged 73. He was survived by his wife of 41 years, the former Georgia Phillips. He was also survived by his daughter, Jamie Swartz; a brother, Jerry Luisi; and two grandchildren. He is buried in Los Angeles at Pierce Brothers Valhalla Memorial Park.

== Filmography (partial) ==
Selected filmography for James Luisi
Film
Year	Title	Role	Notes
1967	The Tiger Makes Out	Pete Copolla	
1972	Ben	Ed	
1973	I Escaped from Devil's Island	Dazzas	
1974	The Man from Independence	Stranger	
1974	The Take	Benedetto	
1977	Stunts	Alvin Blake	Alternative title: The Deadly Game
1978	Killer's Delight	Sgt. Vince De Carlo	
1978	Moment by Moment	Dan Santini	
1979	Norma Rae	George Benson	
1980	Fade to Black	Capt. M.L. Gallagher	
1983	Star 80	Roy	
1983	China Lake	Watch Commander	Short
1986	Murphy's Law	Ed Reineke	
1987	The Hidden	Sleazy cocaine-sniffing Ferrari Salesman	
1988	Lethal Woman	Colonel Jerry Maxim	Alternative title: The Most Dangerous Woman Alive
1988	Feds	Sperry	
1999	Wanted	Vincent Argento	(final film role)
Television
Year	Title	Role	Notes
1961	Naked City	Mark Andrew	Screen / Television debut
1962	The Rifleman	Chuley Carr	1 episode
1963–1964	Bonanza	Willard	2 episodes
1964	The Reporter	Joe	1 episode
1971	The Interns	Nick	1 episode
1972	Cannon	Sonny	1 episode
1972	The Rookies	Kendall	Episode "Rabbits on the Runway"
1973	Hawkins		1 episode
1974	The Rookies	Del Bonner	Episode "Rolling Thunder"
1974	Ironside	Mike Purcell	1 episode
1974	Mannix	John Larkin	1 episode
1974	The Streets of San Francisco	Lloyd Davies	1 episode
1975	S.W.A.T	Phil Garland	1 episode
1976	Starsky and Hutch	Carl Boyce	1 episode
1976	Kojak	Captain Rosseau	1 episode
1976	The Mary Tyler Moore Show	Doug	1 episode
1976	The Rockford Files	Lieutenant Chapman	Season 3 through 6
1976	Good Heavens	Bart Matson	1 episode
1978	Wonder Woman	George	1 episode
1978	Fantasy Island	Arbogast	1 episode
1979	The Eddie Capra Mysteries	Dale Monday	Episode "Murder Plays a Dead Hand"
1979	Quincy M.E.	Marine Colonel Charles Casey	1 episode
1979	Buck Rogers in the 25th Century	Hood	1 episode
1980	CHiPs	Lazarri	1 episode
1980	Here's Boomer	Combs	1 episode
1982	Beyond Witch Mountain	Foreman	Television movie
1983	The Renegades	Lt. Marciana	6 episodes
1984	Riptide	Uptown Bill Brown	1 episode
1984	Hart to Hart	Damian Troy	1 episode
1984	The A-Team	Jimmy Durkee	1 episode
1985	Finder of Lost Loves	Jordan Hollis	1 episode
1985	Knight Rider	D.G. Grebs	1 episode
1985	The Fall Guy	Brazzi	1 episode
1987	Magnum, P.I.	John Walter Costa	1 episode
1987	Knots Landing	Detective Gilbert Garcia	4 episodes
1987–1988	Santa Barbara	Ben Clark	11 episodes
1988	It's a Living	Roscoe	1 episode
1989	The Hogan Family	Leopold	3 episodes
1991	L.A. Law	Paul Viola	1 episode
1992	Tequila and Bonetti	Harry Dirday	1 episode
1996	Baywatch Nights	Murray	1 episode
