= Killer's Delight =

- Directed by: Jeremy Hoenack
- Screenplay by: Maralyn Thoma
- Produced by: Jeremy Hoenack; Maralyn Thoma
- Starring: James Luisi; Susan Sullivan; John Karlen
- Cinematography: Arthur R. Botham
- Edited by: Jeremy Hoenack
- Music by: Byron Olson
- Distributed by: Intercontinental Releasing Corporation
- Release date: April 28, 1978 (San Diego)
- Running time: 85 minutes
- Country: United States

Killer's Delight is a 1978 American slasher film directed, edited, and produced by Jeremy Hoenack, written by Maralyn Thoma, and starring James Luisi, Susan Sullivan, John Karlen, Martin Speer, Hilarie Thompson, and Anne-Marie Martin. Its plot follows a brutal serial killer committing murders in the San Francisco Bay area. The film was loosely based on the crimes of Ted Bundy.

In several European countries, the film was released under the title The Sport Killer, and was also released as The Dark Ride.

== Cast ==
- James Luisi as Sgt. Vince De Carlo
- Susan Sullivan as Dr. Carol Thompson
- John Karlen as Danny T. Atkins
- Martin Speer as Detective Mike Mitelman
- Hilarie Thompson as Annie
- Anne-Marie Martin as first victim
- Sandy Alan as Wanda
- George Buck Flower as Pete

== Release ==
The film screened regionally in Longview, Texas alongside Haunts (1976) on April 12, 1978, before opening in San Diego, California on April 28, 1978.

In several European markets, the film was released under the title The Sport Killer, though it was released theatrically in the United States as Killer's Delight; it was later re-released under the alternate title The Dark Ride.

== Sources ==
- Thrower, Stephen (2007). Nightmare USA: The Untold Story of the Exploitation Independents. London: FAB Press. ISBN 978-1-903-25446-2.
