= Jon Lormer =

American actor (1906–1986)

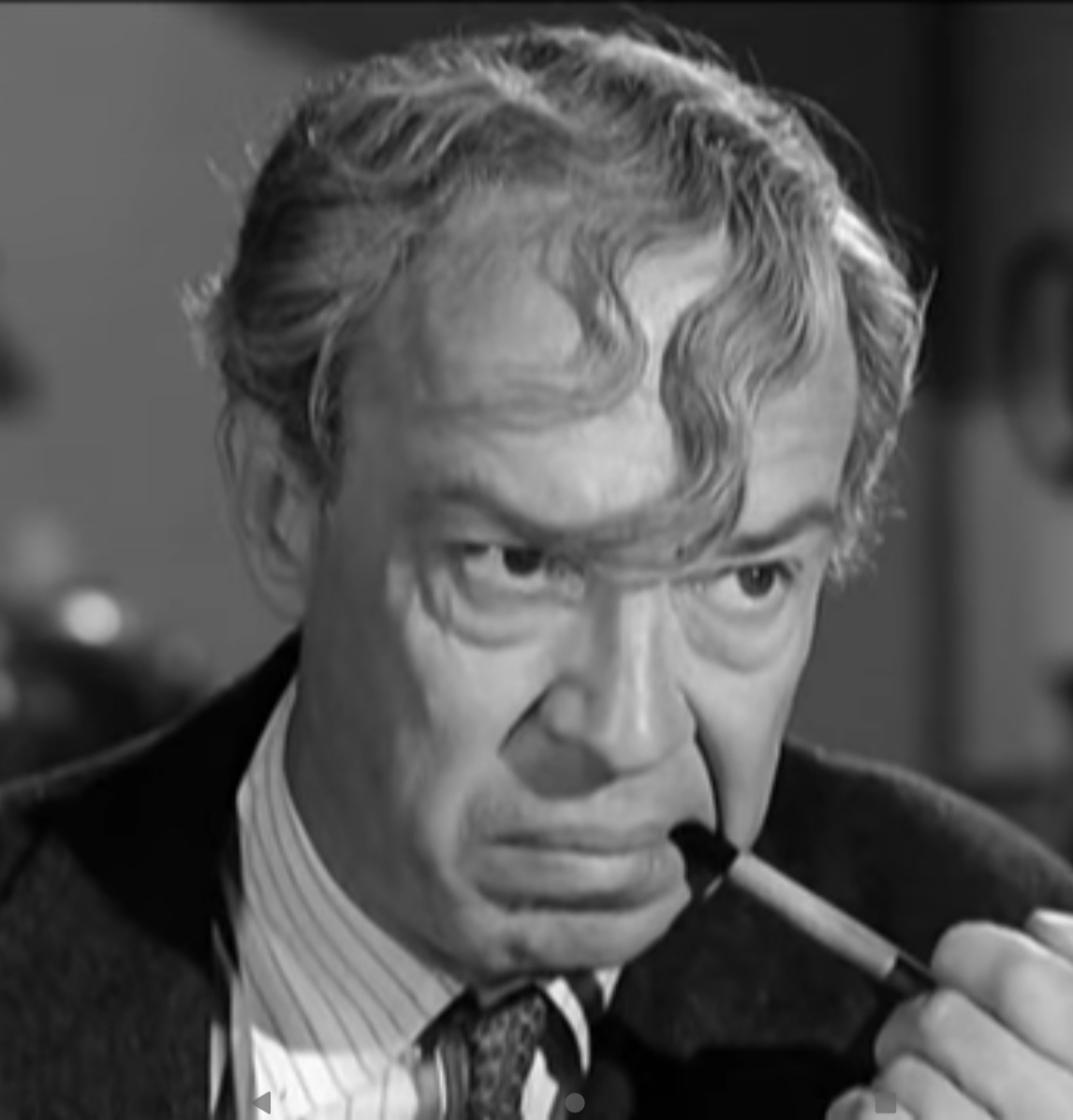
- Lormer in the TV series One Step Beyond (1959)
- Born: May 7, 1906; Canton, Ohio, U.S.
- Died: March 19, 1986 (aged 79); Burbank, California, U.S.
- Other name: John Lormer
- Occupation: Actor
- Years active: 1950–1985

Jon Lormer (May 7, 1906 – March 19, 1986) was an American actor, known for his guest and supporting roles in television series, such as the 1960s' Star Trek, The Twilight Zone, Perry Mason, Peyton Place, and in Creepshow as Nathan Grantham.

== Career ==
Lormer was both a director and an actor with the American Theatre Wing in New York City. His other work on stage included plays in New York City and productions that toured the United States.

Lormer made guest appearances on dozens of television series, often appearing multiple times on the same series but as different characters. He appeared in three separate roles in the original Star Trek series as Dr. Theodore Haskins, in "The Cage" (and "The Menagerie", 1966); as Tamar in "The Return of the Archons" (1967); and as the Old Man in "For the World Is Hollow and I Have Touched the Sky" (1968) who speaks the title line. He played a recurring role as the postman, Silas Huff, in Lassie during the 1953–54 seasons (the Timmy and Lassie years) of the TV series.

From 1959–63, he made 12 appearances on Perry Mason as a medical examiner/autopsy surgeon. In 1959 he appeared in Lawman as Harry Tate, a newspaper editor, in the episodes "The Big Hat" and "The Outsider". In 1960 he played Harry Gillespie in the Rawhide episode "Incident of the Last Chance". Between 1960 and 1963, he was in four episodes of The Twilight Zone: "Execution", "Dust" (credited as "John Lormer"), Strauss in "The Last Rites of Jeff Myrtlebank" and the Minister in "Jess-Belle". In 1961 and 1962, he played three different characters in The Untouchables.

He also appeared three times on The Andy Griffith Show, as Fletch Dilbeck ("Bailey's Bad Boy", 1962), as Tate Fletcher ("The Cow Thief", also 1962) and in 1964 as Parnell Rigsby, a farmer who lost his wallet. He also played roles in Daniel Boone, as Reverend Jimson's father ("The Renegade") and Tuscarora tribesman Yellow Knife ("The Flaming Rocks").

From 1966 to 1968, he made numerous appearances as Judge Chester on the series Peyton Place. In 1967, he played George Ramsey, a building caretaker with a mischievous kitten bent on destruction, for the TV series Lassie episode "The Eighth Life of Henry IV". That same year he appeared as Dr. Pierre Blanchard in the fourth season of the science-fiction television show Voyage to the Bottom of the Sea in the episode named "Fatal Cargo".

In 1971, Lormer appeared as the doctor on The Men From Shiloh (rebranded name for the TV western The Virginian) in the episode titled "The Angus Killer". In 1980, Lormer portrayed Professor Boggs in the syndicated television drama The Life and Times of Eddie Roberts. In 1981, he appeared as Barker, the bumbling butler, in the Magnum, P.I. episode "Ghost Writer".

He appeared in many films, often uncredited. His credited film appearances include One Man's Way (1963), Zebra in the Kitchen (1965), A Fine Madness (1966), The Singing Nun (1966), The Learning Tree (1969), Getting Straight (1970), The Legend of Lizzie Borden (1975), Rooster Cogburn (1975) and The Boogens (1981). He also appeared as Nathan Grantham in the 1982 horror-comedy film Creepshow. His last television appearance was in a November 1984 episode of Highway to Heaven.

== Death ==
On March 19, 1986, Lormer died of cancer at Saint Joseph Medical Center in Burbank, California. He was 79 years old.

== Partial filmography ==
- Studio One in Hollywood TV episodes (1950, 1951) – as different characters
- The Goldbergs TV episodes (1955, 1956) – Henry Carey
- Girls on the Loose (1958) – Doctor
- From Hell to Texas (1958) – Grizzled Man (uncredited)
- The Matchmaker (1958) – Mr. Duckworth, Jeweler (uncredited)
- I Want to Live! (1958) – San Quentin Doctor (uncredited)
- Wanted Dead or Alive TV episode "The Giveaway Gun" (1958) – Jack the stableman (uncredited)
- Gunsmoke TV episode "Young Love” (1958) – Jesse Wheat (uncredited)
- Rally 'Round the Flag, Boys! (1958) – George Melvin (uncredited)
- "Have Gun Will Travel" (1958)-Judge Cates in "Three Sons" S1 E34
- Career (1959) – Process Server (uncredited)
- Peter Gunn TV episode (1959) – Coroner, John Grandland, MD
- The Gazebo (1959) – Dr. Weiner (uncredited)
- One Step Beyond TV episode "The Captain's Guests" (1959) – Realtor Leach
- Perry Mason TV episodes (1959–1963) as coroner or medical examiner
- Tales of Wells Fargo TV episodes (1959–1962) – as different characters
- One Step Beyond TV episode "Who Are You" (1960) – Joe Fisher
- Gunsmoke TV episode "Jailbait Jane" (1960) – Railroad Clerk
- Pollyanna (1960) – Mr. Geary (uncredited)
- Route 66 (1960) TV episode "A Fury Slinging Flame" – Mr. White
- Where the Boys Are (1960) – Motel Manager (uncredited)
- Ada (1961) – James Ordman – Committee Man (uncredited)
- The Comancheros (1961) – White-Haired Man on Riverboat (uncredited)
- The Untouchables TV episodes (1961–1962) as different characters
- The Wonderful World of the Brothers Grimm (1962) – The Doctor (uncredited)
- Dead Ringer (1964) – Alonzo (uncredited)
- One Man's Way (1964) – John Hellman
- A Tiger Walks (1964) – Mr. Wilson, Butcher (uncredited)
- Kisses for My President (1964) – Chief Justice of the Supreme Court (uncredited)
- Youngblood Hawke (1964) – Dr. Eversill (uncredited)
- Two on a Guillotine (1965) – Minister at Funeral (uncredited)
- Zebra in the Kitchen (1965) – Judge
- The Singing Nun (1966) – The Bishop (uncredited)
- A Fine Madness (1966) – Dr. Huddleson
- Dimension 5 (1966) – Professor
- The Sand Pebbles (1966) – Hamilton (uncredited)
- Star Trek TV episodes (1966–1968) different characters
- Doctor, You've Got to Be Kidding! (1967) – Dr. Capper (uncredited)
- If He Hollers, Let Him Go! (1968) – Chaplain
- The Learning Tree (1969) – McCormack
- Getting Straight (1970) – Vandenburg
- Doctors' Wives (1971) – Elderly Doctor
- The Virginian (TV series) (1971) – saison 9 episode 14 (Nan Allen) – Dr. Walker
- The Virginian (TV series) (1971) – saison 9 episode 17 (The Angus Killer) – Dr. Walker
- The Legend of Lizzie Borden (1975) – Bailiff
- Rooster Cogburn (1975) – Rev. Goodnight
- The Boogens (1981) – Blanchard
- Creepshow (1982) – Nathan Grantham (segment "Father's Day")
- The Healing (1983) – Jamie
- Beyond the Next Mountain (1987) – Watkin Roberts (final film role)
