= National Lampoon's Class Reunion =

1982 film by Michael Miller

- Theatrical release poster
- Directed by: Michael Miller
- Written by: John Hughes
- Produced by: Matty Simmons
- Starring: Gerrit Graham; Fred McCarren; Miriam Flynn; Stephen Furst; Shelley Smith; Michael Lerner; Chuck Berry
- Cinematography: Philip Lathrop
- Edited by: Ann Mills; Richard Meyer
- Music by: Peter Bernstein; Mark Goldenberg
- Production company: ABC Motion Pictures
- Distributed by: 20th Century-Fox
- Release date: October 29, 1982
- Running time: 85 minutes
- Country: United States
- Language: English
- Box office: $16.5 million

National Lampoon's: Class Reunion is a 1982 American black comedy film produced by National Lampoon as the third film from the magazine. It was the second film released; although National Lampoon's Movie Madness was filmed in 1981, it was delayed and not released until 1982. The film was produced by ABC Motion Pictures and released by 20th Century-Fox on October 29, 1982, grossing $16.5 million.

In the film, the 1972 graduating class of a high school is gathering for their class reunion. They are unaware that among the guests is an escaped mental patient, who wants revenge for a decade-old sadistic prank which had ruined his life and his sanity. After several deaths at the reunion, the surviving alumni team-up to discover who is their secret enemy.

== Plot ==
Lizzie Borden High's class of 1972 is getting ready to go through the motions at their 10-year reunion when a deranged alumnus named Walter Baylor, who was driven insane by a horrible, sadistic, senior-year prank, escapes from the mental institution and decides to crash the party at his high school reunion. Guests start to disappear and are found dead; the other alumni, including the high class snooty yacht salesman Bob Spinnaker, class tease Bunny Packard, and the class zero Gary Nash, spring into action as they try to uncover the culprit and put an end to the nightmare that has become their class reunion.

== Cast ==
- Gerrit Graham – Bob Spinnaker
- Michael Lerner – Dr. Robert Young
- Misty Rowe – Cindy Shears
- Blackie Dammett – Walter Baylor
- Fred McCarren – Gary Nash
- Miriam Flynn – Bunny Packard
- Stephen Furst – Hubert Downs
- Mews Small – Iris Augen
- Shelly Smith – Meredith Modess
- Zane Buzby – Delores Salk
- Jim Staahl – Egon Von Stoker
- Jacklyn Zeman – Jane Washborn
- Barry Diamond – Chip Hendrix
- Art Evans – Carl Clapton
- Marla Pennington – Mary Beth McFadden
- Randy Powell – Jeff Barnes
- Anne Ramsey – Mrs. Tabazooski
- Steve Tracy - Milt Friedman
- John Hughes – 'Girl' with bag on head (uncredited)

== Production ==
John Hughes claimed he had been fired from the film. "They didn't even want me around, and I was shocked when I saw the movie", he said. "My screenplay had been completely butchered, and my name will nevertheless be on the credits forever."

== Release ==
The film was released theatrically in the United States by 20th Century-Fox in October 1982. It proved to be a huge disappointment for the company, grossing only $16,550,727 at the box office. In the opening weekend for the film, it made $3,086,525.

In 1982, Dell Publishing released a "photo novel" version book, adapted from John Hughes' screenplay by Sandra Choron. The film was released on VHS, Betamax and laserdisc by Vestron Video in 1983. In August 1998, Anchor Bay Entertainment re-released the film on VHS. In 2000, Anchor Bay Entertainment released the film on DVD. The film was re-released on DVD by MGM in 2005.

In April 2018, Kino Lorber announced it would release the film on DVD and Blu-ray, sourced from a new 4K transfer.

== Soundtrack ==
The score for the 1982 movie National Lampoons Class Reunion was composed by Peter Bernstein and Mark Goldenberg and includes a live onscreen performance by Chuck Berry, and a small scene where the actors perform the classic 1965 hit "Stop! in the Name of Love". The score was edited by Jim Harrison and Lada Productions.

Songs were performed by:

- Gary "U.S." Bonds – "Class Reunion" (written by Peter Bernstein and Mark Goldenberg)
- Chuck Berry – "It Wasn't Me", "My Dingaling", and "Festival"

== National Lampoon history ==
National Lampoon's Class Reunion was the second big-screen movie that was released from the Original National Lampoon Company. The movie had a huge buildup, and viewers expected it to be another hit for the National Lampoon franchise, because it was following National Lampoon's Animal House, the company's first big-screen release in 1978. The original company consisted of the writers from the National Lampoon magazine and some of the cast from the National Lampoon Radio Hour and the stage show National Lampoon's Lemmings.

== Reception ==
National Lampoon's Class Reunion suffered negative reviews on release. On review aggregator website Rotten Tomatoes, 0% of 7 critics' reviews are positive. Audiences polled by CinemaScore gave the film an average grade of "D" on an A+ to F scale.

According to TV Guide, "this is a very unfunny film which was released after the successful National Lampoon's Animal House, and which died at the box office, focuses on the 10th reunion of a 1972 high-school graduating class. The plot combines both comedy and horror-slasher elements, a combination that doesn't work. A murderer is killing off class members, who are such dull, dreary creatures, no one could blame him. Even Chuck Berry, who makes a brief appearance singing a medley of his songs, can't save this one."

Christopher Tookey states, "Very inferior follow-up to Animal House, with remarkably tasteless basis for comedy. John Hughes can be blamed for the script, a feeble spoof of a slasher movie. Songs are used to extend running length, but even Chuck Berry seems under par."

Movie historian Leonard Maltin seemed to agree, citing the picture as a "BOMB" and calling it "Spectacularly unfunny... If you went to school with people like this, no jury on earth would convict you for becoming a homicidal maniac, either."
