= H. G. Wells' The Shape of Things to Come =

1979 science fiction film by George McCowan

H. G. Wells' The Shape of Things to Come'
- DVD cover art
- Directed by: George McCowan
- Written by: Mike Cheda; Joseph Glazner; Martin Lager
- Based on: The Shape of Things to Come by H. G. Wells
- Produced by: William Davidson
- Starring: Jack Palance; Barry Morse; Nicholas Campbell; Eddie Benton; Carol Lynley; John Ireland
- Cinematography: Reginald H. Morris
- Edited by: Stan Cole
- Music by: Paul Hoffert
- Production companies: Astral Films; CFI Investments; SOTTC Film Production Ltd.
- Distributed by: International Film Distributors
- Release date: May 4, 1979
- Running time: 98 minutes
- Country: Canada
- Language: English

H. G. Wells' The Shape of Things to Come is a 1979 Canadian science fiction film directed by George McCowan, and starring Jack Palance, Barry Morse, Nicholas Campbell, Eddie Benton, Carol Lynley and John Ireland.

Although credited as an adaptation of H. G. Wells' novel of the same name, the film takes only its title and some character names from the 1933 novel. The film's plot has no relationship to the events of the book. The book and its 1936 film adaptation Things to Come predict events such as a Second World War and the collapse of social order until a world state is formed, whereas the 1979 film involves a high-tech future involving robots and spaceships.

The film was an attempt to capitalize on the popularity of such recent successes as Star Wars, and TV series such as Space: 1999 (also starring Morse), Battlestar Galactica, and Star Trek, although the film had only a fraction of the production budgets of any of these.

== Plot ==
In the future, Earth is recovering from the devastating Robot Wars. Most of humanity lives on the Moon in a domed city called New Washington. They depend on the anti-radiation drug RADIC-Q-2 from the distant planet Delta 3. A cargo ship carrying the drug crashes into the dome with disastrous results. The colony leader, Senator Smedley, and science advisor Dr. John Caball, try to contact Nikki, the leader of Delta 3. They find that Omus, the Robot Master (also Caball's former apprentice), has declared himself emperor. Having crashed the cargo ship on purpose, Omus demands the colony's obedience or else he will invade with robots.

Smedley refuses to comply. Caball suggests launching an armed advanced starship called the Starstreak against Omus. Smedley says that the ship has yet to be tested. Caball boards regardless and, before launch, exposes himself to deadly radiation from the ship's nuclear reactor room while making urgent repairs. With no time left to obtain radiation drugs and without telling anyone, Caball calls for his son Jason to help him pilot the ship. Tagging along are Smedley's daughter Kim, and Sparks, a teleporting pilot robot from the cargo ship. They steal the Starstreak and head to Delta 3.

While in space, a malfunction forces the Starstreak to stop at Earth. While Caball conducts repairs, Jason and Kim explore in hopes of locating Caball's friend Charley. Small figures stalk them in the woods. Jason finds Charley dead. Kim has disappeared. Jason and Sparks find her with a group of harmless children who survived the Robot Wars, who are in dire need of RADIC-Q-2. The group leave the kids behind with food, but they promise to return once their mission is complete.

On Delta 3, Nikki has formed a resistance force. They will try to retake the planet's Citadel from Omus and his robots. The Starstreak enters a dangerous gravity vortex in space. The crew escape the storm. Delta 3 conveniently appears before them. On the planet, the crew finds Nikki and her people. Robots surround the heroes. A hologram of Omus appears. He has Caball brought before him. Jason and the others sneak inside the Citadel.

Omus shows off his latest achievements to his old mentor. He turned the mining robots into shock troopers. Unimpressed, Caball tries to talk Omus into giving up his plan to control humanity. Omus refuses to listen. He dons a transparent helmet where he shows Caball another creation: a spinning disco ball-like device that drives Caball mad with pain and then kills him.

At Omus' chambers, Jason finds his father murdered. Nikki reveals that Caball had severe radiation sickness and was terminally ill, but it was Omus' device that actually killed him. Furious, Jason confronts Omus, whose robots take him prisoner; thanks to Sparks, all the robots turn on their master and run out of control. Jason and the others flee the control room. Sparks has teleported to one of Omus' cargo ships and taken over the main computer system. The robot frenzy overloads critical systems and explosions rip through the Citadel. Sparks escapes in the cargo ship. The others make it back to the Starstreak and lift off. Omus sits in his control room as the Citadel explodes around him. The destruction of the Citadel causes the whole planet to explode. The last scene shows the two ships returning to Earth, with the cargo ship hauling a supply of RADIC-Q-2.

== Cast ==
- Jack Palance as Omus
- Barry Morse as Dr. John Caball
- Nicholas Campbell as Jason Caball
- Eddie Benton as Kim Smedley
- Carol Lynley as Nikki
- John Ireland as Senator Smedley
- Greg Swanson as Sparks (voice)
- William Hutt as Lomax (voice)
- Mark Parr as Sparks
- Ardon Bess as Merrick

== Production ==
The first choice for the role of Kim Smedley was Koo Stark.

Principal photography started on October 23, 1978; the film was shot in the Toronto area, and had a $3.2 million budget.

== Release ==
The film was released in Canada and the United Kingdom in May 1979. In the U.S., it only received a limited release the same year.

== Critical reception ==
G. Noel Gross of DVD Talk said, "Released in 1979, the sets and FX look more akin to 1959 with the aptly named 'Sparks' and his robo-ilk who precariously teeter along like oversized popcorn poppers with great big salad tongs for arms."

== Legacy ==
The Mystery Science Theater 3000 spiritual successor RiffTrax released a comedic commentary of the film in early 2020.

The film was later featured on MST3K itself as part of season 13.

== See also ==
- Things to Come, a 1936 film scripted by Wells, based on his novel
