= Anne-Marie Martin =

Canadian screenwriter, equestrian, and former actress (born 1957)

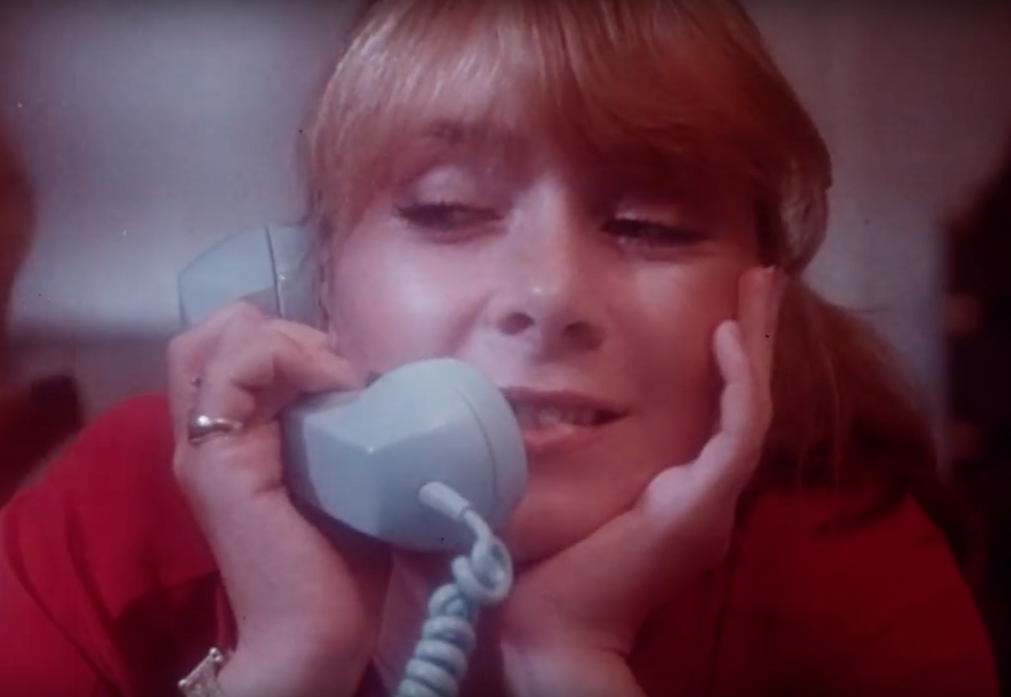
- Martin in Prom Night (1980)
- Born: Edmonda Benton; November 11, 1957 (age 68); Toronto, Ontario, Canada
- Other name: Eddie Benton
- Occupations: Actress; screenwriter; equestrian
- Years active: 1976–2003
- Known for: Sledge Hammer!; Prom Night; Days of Our Lives; The Boogens
- Spouse: Michael Crichton (m. 1987; div. 2003)
- Children: 1

Anne-Marie Martin (born Edmonda Benton; November 11, 1957) is a Canadian screenwriter, equestrian, and former actress who is best known for playing Sgt. Dori Doreau in the American television comedy series Sledge Hammer! from 1986 to 1988, as well as her roles in several horror films, such as Prom Night (1980) and The Boogens (1981).

== Early life ==
Martin was born Edmonda Benton in Toronto, Ontario on November 11, 1957. Prior to embarking on a screen acting career, she worked for theatre director Hrant Alianak in Toronto, performing at the Theatre Passe Muraille.

== Career ==
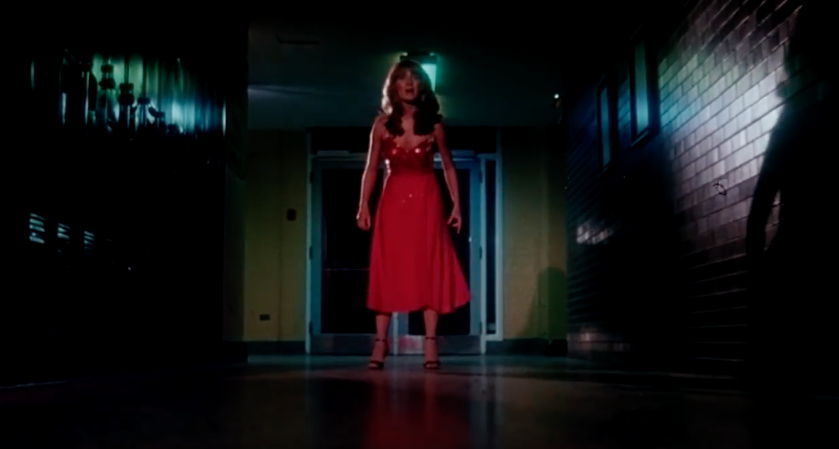
Still of Martin as 'Wendy' in Prom Night

In her early career, Martin was credited under the name Eddie Benton, most notably in the unsuccessful series pilot/telefilm Dr. Strange (1978), for which she was paid $2,000 a week. She subsequently appeared in the slasher film Prom Night (1980), Savage Harvest (1981), The Boogens (1981), and had a cameo in Halloween II (1981); as well as numerous TV series guest roles. Among these were Stella Breed, a woman with psychokinetic powers in the Buck Rogers in the 25th Century episode "Twiki is Missing", and an officer who faces an amputation after injury in the line of duty on T. J. Hooker.

Prior to this, Martin appeared in The Shape of Things to Come (1979), a low-budget Canadian science fiction film that attempted to capitalize on the popularity of Star Wars and Battlestar Galactica. Martin had previously auditioned for the role of Princess Leia in Star Wars. She was also a regular on the short-lived 1977 series Rafferty opposite Patrick McGoohan and appeared in the equally short-lived Time Express in 1979.

In the early 1980s, she appeared in a Highway to Heaven episode in which she and Victor French traded bodies. From 1982 to 1985, she appeared as attorney Gwen Davies on the soap opera Days of Our Lives. Alan Spencer subsequently cast her in Sledge Hammer!, as Dori Doreau; he also wrote an episode of the series that allowed her to, if not exactly change bodies with Sledge Hammer, at least impersonate him. Martin appeared as Doreau on the series from 1986 until 1988.

== Personal life ==
Martin married author Michael Crichton in 1987 (she had had a small role in Crichton's film Runaway three years earlier), and following the cancellation of Sledge Hammer!, retired from TV and film acting. In 1989, they had a daughter, Taylor-Anne. Martin co-wrote, with Crichton, the screenplay to the 1996 film Twister. The couple separated in 2001 and divorced in 2003.

Martin went on to pursue her love of horses and ride competitively. She rode for Team USA in the World Championship competition for Icelandic horses.

== Filmography ==
=== Film ===
Year	Title	Role	Notes	Ref.
1978	Dr. Strange	Clea Lake	As Eddie Benton; Television film	
1978	Deadman's Curve	Nancy	As Eddie Benton	
1978	Killer's Delight	First Victim – Girl with Dog	As Eddie Benton	
1979	The Shape of Things to Come	Kim Smedley	As Eddie Benton	
1980	Waikiki	Penny	As Eddie Benton; Television film	
1980	Prom Night	Wendy	As Eddie Benton	
1981	Savage Harvest	Wendy		
1981	The Boogens	Jessica Esford		
1981	Halloween II	Darcy Essmont	Uncredited	
1984	Runaway	Hooker at Bar		
1996	Twister	—N/a	Writer	

=== Television ===
Year	Title	Role	Notes	Ref.
1976	Wonder Woman	June	Episode: "Beauty on Parade"	
1977	The Streets of San Francisco	Lisa Demming	Episode: "Once a Con"	
1977	Rafferty	Nurse Koscinski	3 episodes	
1977	Magic Mongo	Lola	Episode: "Two Faces of Donald"	
1978	Switch	Jacy Young	Episode: "Photo Finish"	
1979	240-Robert	Lauri	Episode: "Earthquake"	
1979	Time Express	Laureen Cole	Episode: "Rodeo/Cop"	
1980	B. J. and the Bear	Deirdre	Episode: "BJ and the Witch"	
1980	Buck Rogers in the 25th Century	Stella Breed	Episode: "Twiki is Missing"	
1981	The Misadventures of Sheriff Lobo	Charlotte McGraw	Episode: "Keep on Buckin'"	
1983	The Powers of Matthew Star	Roxanne	Episode: "Brain Drain"	
1983	T. J. Hooker	Officer Karen Hall	Episode: "Lady in Blue"	
1984	The Young Ones	Victorian Principle	Episode: "Time"	
1984	St. Elsewhere	Mrs. Dowd	Episode: "The Children's Hour"	
1982–1985	Days of Our Lives	Gwen Davies	Series regular	
1986	Highway to Heaven	Linda Blackwell/Mark Gordon	Episode: "Change of Life"	
1986–1988	Sledge Hammer!	Dori Doreau	Main cast	

=== Miscellaneous ===
Year	Title	Role	Notes	Ref.
2003	Virtua Cop 3	Janet T. Marshall	Video game	
