= Just as I Am (Rob Hegel song) =

1982 single by Rob Hegel

Single by Rob Hegel
- Released: 1982
- Genre: Pop rock
- Length: 4:28
- Label: Mercury
- Songwriters: Dick Wagner, Rob Hegel

Rob Hegel singles chronology
"We're Lovers After All" (1980)	"Just as I Am" (1982)	"In a Gadda Da Vida" (1982)

"Just as I Am" is a song by American singer-songwriter Rob Hegel. It was co-written with Dick Wagner, and was released as a single in 1982. The song was covered three years later by English-Australian soft rock duo Air Supply from their eighth studio album, Air Supply. It was later covered by Kahoru Kohiruimaki on her 1985 debut album, Call My Name.

== Rob Hegel's original version ==
"Just as I Am" is a ballad written by Hegel and Dick Wagner in 1982 and released as a non-album single which failed to chart. It was covered three years later by English-Australian duo Air Supply and became a top 20 hit.

== Air Supply version ==
"Just as I Am"

Single by Air Supply

from the album Air Supply
- B-side: "Crazy Love"
- Released: May 1985
- Recorded: 1984
- Genre: Soft rock
- Length: 4:46
- Label: Arista
- Songwriters: Dick Wagner; Rob Hegel
- Producer: Bob Ezrin

Air Supply singles chronology
"I Can Wait Forever" (1984)	"Just as I Am" (1985)	"The Power of Love (You Are My Lady)" (1985)

In May 1985, English-Australian soft rock duo Air Supply covered the song which was released as the lead single from their second eponymous and eighth studio album Air Supply (1985). It became a top 20 hit on the Billboard Hot 100.

=== Chart performance ===
"Just as I Am" peaked at No. 19 on the Billboard Hot 100, and No. 3 on the Adult Contemporary chart. It was to be Air Supply's last top 40 hit on the Billboard Hot 100. The song also reached No. 12 on the Canadian RPM singles chart, and No. 9 on its Adult Contemporary chart. In Australia, the song peaked at No. 79.

=== Charts ===
Chart (1985)	Peak position
Australia (Kent Music Report)	79
Canada Top Singles (RPM)	18
Guatemala (UPI)	1
Panamá (UPI)	1
Paraguay (UPI)	4
Puerto Rico (UPI)	1
US Billboard Hot 100	19
US Adult Contemporary (Billboard)	3
Venezuela (UPI)	2

=== Track listing ===
U.S. 7" single
A. "Just as I Am" - 4:31
B. "Crazy Love" - 3:58

UK 12" single
A1. "Just as I Am"
A2. "All Out of Love"
B1. "Crazy Love"
B2. "Lost in Love"
B3. "Even the Nights Are Better"
