= Rob Hegel =

American singer-songwriter (born 1948)

- Born: Robert Eric Hegel; August 5, 1948 (age 77); Dayton, Ohio, U.S.
- Genres: Pop rock, country
- Occupations: Singer-songwriter, arranger, producer, author
- Instruments: Vocals, piano, guitar
- Label: Red Lips Records
- Website: www.robhegel.com

Robert Eric Hegel (born August 5, 1948) is an American singer-songwriter and international recording artist best known for writing the Air Supply top twenty hit "Just as I Am", the top ten disco hit "Sinner Man" for Sarah Dash (of LaBelle), and "Do It For Our Country" from the movie Grease 2. "Just As I Am" has been recorded by many artists all over the world with the reggae version by L.U.S.T. topping the Jamaican, New York and Canadian reggae charts in 2009.

Rob has written and produced albums for country singer Rowdy McCarran, America's Got Talent winner Landau Eugene Murphy Jr., and an EP for country artist/Vegas performer Michael Braun.

== Early life ==
Born in Dayton, Ohio, Hegel attended Centerville High School and was in the garage band The Chandells that changed its name to Bittervetch with the release of the 7" single "Bigger Fool", in 1966.

Hegel enrolled at the University of Cincinnati College Conservatory of Music and continued to write and perform in various clubs around campus. Spotted by a producer while playing piano and singing in the lobby of his dorm, Hegel was asked to join a band called Me & The Other Guys that needed a singer and some original songs for a recording session. The result of the offer was a 45 release of two of Hegel's demos written during his Chandells/Bittervetch days, "I Don't Care" b/w "When You Wake Up In The Morning". The single was recorded at the famous King Studios in Cincinnati, the same studio where James Brown and the Famous Flames recorded. Hegel provided vocals but otherwise did not play on the songs. "I Don't Care" is relatively faithful to The Chandells' original, but "When You Wake Up In The Morning" – which in Hegel's demo is an excellent John Sebastian-like ballad - was sped up and really suffered in comparison to the original.

== Music career ==
In 1973, RCA signed Rob to a recording contract and released the singles "New York City Girl" and "Hello Jekyll, Goodbye Mister Hyde".

He signed a publishing deal with Don Kirshner and, along with his lyricist Amanda George, wrote songs for various television projects such as NBC's The Kids from C.A.P.E.R., the CBS sitcom A Year at the Top (co-produced with Norman Lear), theme songs for the pilot episodes of Say Uncle and Stick Around (starring Andy Kaufman), and the theme for Don Kirshner's Rock Concert.

In 1980, RCA released the Hegel LP. The first single from the album, "Tommy, Judy & Me", received radio airplay on the East Coast, including New York City. The single would peak at No. 109 on the Bubbling Under Hot 100 chart. The opening lyric, "Tommy said that he's had some girls in the strangest positions in the back of his car", was deemed too controversial for many stations to add it to their playlists. The popularity of the song on the stations that did play it caught the attention of Dick Clark, and Hegel was invited to appear on American Bandstand Upon arriving in Hollywood, Hegel was informed that the network censors would not clear "Tommy, Judy & Me" and the producer asked for two other songs to be performed instead.

Choreographer Patricia Birch, who had just been given the director's chair for the film Grease 2, heard "Tommy, Judy & Me" and asked Hegel to submit some songs. After receiving the script, Hegel wrote "Do It for Our Country" for the bomb shelter scene.

In 1981, Hegel was introduced to guitarist and songwriter Dick Wagner and they decided to write some songs for Hegel to record and Wagner to produce. The first song written and recorded was "Just as I Am". Record promoter Chuck Dembrak took the recording to Chip Taylor at Polydor/Mercury Records and Hegel was signed to a recording contract. In 1983, on the day Chip Taylor and the entire promotion department were fired, "Just as I Am" was released.

Hegel later received a call from a former associate at RCA, Dave Carpin, who was now at Arista, and suggested "Just as I Am" would be the perfect follow-up to Air Supply's hit song "Making Love Out of Nothing at All" and was to give it to Clive Davis for evaluation. In 1985, Arista released Air Supply's version of the song and it became a top twenty U.S. hit.

Also in 1985, Chuck Dembrak approached Hegel with an idea to do a dance instrumental version of the Iron Butterfly song, "In-A-Gadda-Da-Vida" for Kama Sutra Records. Dembrak brought in guitarist Les Fradkin and with Hegel producing and playing the synthesizer parts with Fradkin, their version was recorded. Needing a B-side, Hegel enlisted his friend Dick Wagner, and together they recorded an instrumental version of Hegel's "Frustrated", released in 1985.

Hegel released Hegel 2 – Displays (a 20-song CD compilation) on Red Lips Records in 2009. The CD features original first recordings of his songs "Tommy, Judy & Me", "We're Lovers After All", and "You Wonder". A download-only collection titled Road Signs was released in 2012 and features some of Hegel's current work. In 2014, Hegel was asked to contribute songs to the Pete Quaife Foundation CD, Legends – Shoulder to Shoulder. Hegel contributed "You & I" from his Road Signs CD and recorded a mostly a cappella version of the Kinks hit song, "Tired of Waiting for You". The CD set was released in 2014.

In addition to songwriting and recording, Hegel has been recognized for his vocal harmonies and background vocal arranging skills. For Don Kirshner, Hegel arranged and sang background vocals (with Jay Siegel of The Tokens) for The Kids from C.A.P.E.R. project, and two albums by Sarah Dash; her eponymous debut album that featured "Sinner Man" and the follow-up Oo-La-La. Producer Steve Katz called Hegel into the studio to sing multi-overdub background vocals for the "Sad Song" track on Lou Reed Live, and for Harper Hug at Thunder Underground Recording Studio. Hegel arranged and performed all background vocals on Jamie Palumbo's Realistic CD and sang the background vocals on John Stanley King Band's "Dem Boulettes".

Rob's career was honored with his induction into the Centerville High School Hall of Fame in 2024.

== Novel ==
In his first novel, Tuxedo Bob, co-authored with his wife Susan, Hegel combines his songwriting abilities with his love for the English language to create a humorous tale about a uniquely talented, impeccably dressed, and compulsively honest man.

== Discography ==
=== Albums ===
- 1980 – Hegel, RCA Records
- 2005 – Masters & Demos – Chapter 1, Gear Fab Records
- 2009 – Hegel 2 - Displays, Red Lips Records
- 2012 – Road Signs, Red Lips Records
- 2015 – Make It Magical, Red Lips Records
- 2019 - Tommy, Judy and Me + 23 for the record, Red Lips Records

=== Recordings ===
- 1966 – "Bigger Fool" b/w "A Girl Like You", Pixie Records
- 1967 – "I Don't Care", Hinda Records
- 1973 – "New York City Girl" b/w Clock in the Tower", RCA Records
- 1974 – "Hello Jekyll, Goodbye Mister Hyde", RCA Records
- 1980 – "Tommy, Judy and Me", RCA Records
- 1980 – "We're Lovers After All", RCA Records
- 1982 – "Just as I Am", Mercury Records
- 1985 – "In a Gadda Da Vida", (as MADDOG), Kama Sutra Records
- 2009 – "It's Almost Christmas", Red Lips Records
- 2015 - "Tired of Waiting"
- 2023 - "Something Is Going To Happen"
