= Shell Game (TV series) =

- Genre: Comedy drama
- Created by: Carla Jean Wagner
- Starring: James Read; Margot Kidder; Chip Zien; Marg Helgenberger; Rod McCary; Fred McCarren
- Composers: Richard Lewis Warren (pilot); Michael Colombier; Udi Harpaz
- Country of origin: United States
- Original language: English
- No. of seasons: 1
- No. of episodes: 6

Production
- Producers: Alex Beaton; John Wirth
- Running time: 60 minutes
- Production companies: Lou-Step Productions; Hey Keed Productions; Warner Bros. Television

Original release
- Network: CBS
- Release: January 8 – February 12, 1987

Shell Game is an American comedy-drama television series that aired on CBS from January 8 until February 12, 1987.

== Premise ==
Two former con artists use their skills in a consumer-action show.

== Cast ==
- James Read as John Reid
- Margot Kidder as Jennie Jerome
- Chip Zien as Bert Luna
- Marg Helgenberger as Natalie Thayer
- Rod McCary as William Bauer
- Fred McCarren as Vince Vanneman

== Episodes ==
| No. | Title | Directed by | Written by | Original release date |
|---|---|---|---|---|
| 1 | "Pilot" | Lou Antonio | Carla Jean Wagner | January 8, 1987 |
John hides Jennie after a con gone wrong. Jennie helps John into an asylum where an heiress is being held.
| 2 | "Norman's Parking Ticket" | Harry Harris | Gerald Sanoff | January 15, 1987 |
A man's car was ticketed and used for murder, but the man claims he was out of town.
| 3 | "The Old Team" | Paul Krasny | Nick Thiel & Kerry Ehrin | January 22, 1987 |
The consumer-action show is on to a con done by Jennie and her father
| 4 | "The Upstairs Gardener" | Chris Leitch | John Wirth | January 29, 1987 |
An illegal alien is accused of killing an heiress.
| 5 | "Pai Gow" | Harry Mastrogeorge | John Wells & Mitchell Fink | February 5, 1987 |
When a man is charged with drunk driving and manslaughter, he claims he was set up.
| 6 | "Dead Wrong" | Chris Leitch | John Wirth & John Wells | February 12, 1987 |
Luna and Bauer are fired when they air an unsubstantiated arsonist story, Jennie and John makes a bet on who can solve the case first.
