= Mad Mex (Pennsylvania) =

Mexican fast-food restaurant chain

- Industry: Restaurant
- Headquarters: Pittsburgh, United States
- Area served: United States
- Key people: Tom Baron
- Products: Tacos, burritos, and other Mexican-related fast food

Mad Mex is a chain of fast-food restaurants based in Pittsburgh, that purveys Mexican cuisine in Pennsylvania.

Mad Mex was originally a Mexican restaurant first opened by big Burrito Restaurant Group on the University of Pittsburgh campus in 1993.

== History ==
Mad Mex opened its first restaurant in Pittsburgh on 29 Oct 1993.

== Founder ==
Tom Baron, the co-founder of Mad Mex, grew up in New York City before becoming a graduate of the University of Michigan.

== See also ==
- List of restaurant chains in the United States
- List of Mexican restaurants
