= Lawrence J. Cohen =

- Occupation(s): psychologist, author

Lawrence J. Cohen was a psychologist and author, specializing in children's play and play therapy. He developed a playful approach to child raising, in general, and to childhood anxiety, in particular.

== Life and work ==
He attended Haverford College and received his PhD in clinical psychology from Duke University. After an internship at Tulane University, he began a research and private practice career in Madison, Wisconsin.

He published his first book on his approach in 2001. His books have been translated into fourteen languages. His column in 'Nick Jr. Magazine' was the winner of the 2003 'Golden Lamp' award from 'Education Press'. He is also the co-author, with Anthony DeBenedet, of 'The Art of Roughhousing'. He wrote two books about children's friendships and peer relationships with Michael Thompson and Catherine O'Neill Grace: 'Best Friends, Worst Enemies', and 'Mom, They're Teasing Me'.

He and his wife Liz have two children.

== Books ==
- 2013 The Opposite of Worry: The Playful Parenting Approach to Childhood Anxieties and Fears. New York, NY: Ballantine Books, ISBN 978-0345539335
- 2001 Playful Parenting: A Bold New Way to Nurture Close Connections, Solve Behavior Problems, and Encourage Children's Confidence. New York, NY: Ballantine Books, ISBN 978-0345442864
