= Countess (disambiguation) =

Countess is the female equivalent of the title Count, or in Britain of the title Earl.

Countess or The Countess may also refer to:

- Countess (cake)

== Geography ==
- Countess, Alberta, a community in Canada
- Countess Hospital, in Chester, England

== Arts ==
- The Countess (trans woman), a 19th-century French singer and courtesan
- Countess (novel), a novel by Josephine Edgar
- The Countess (play), 1999 play
- The Countess (film), a 2009 film about Elizabeth Báthory
- "The Countess" (The Rockford Files), a 1974 television episode
- The Countess (American Horror Story), an American Horror Story: Hotel character
- The Countess, Hrabina (opera), an opera by Stanisław Moniuszko
- Countess (band), a black metal band
