= John Martin (actor) =

American film and television actor

- Born: John Henderson Martin; July 21, 1951 (age 75); Turlock, California, U.S.
- Education: University of Florida
- Occupations: Film and television actor
- Years active: 1981–present

John Henderson Martin (born July 21, 1951) is an American film and television actor.

== Life and career ==
Martin was born in Turlock, California. He attended the University of Florida, earning his degree in political science. He began his screen career in 1981, appearing in the television film Stand by Your Man. He appeared in films El Norte, Black Roses and starred in television films Stalking Back and Praying Mantis. He guest-starred in television programs including The Love Boat, T.J. Hooker, Three's Company, Columbo and Archie Bunker's Place. In 1988, he starred as Matthew Moorhouse in the film Black Roses, starring along with Ken Swofford and Julie Adams.

Martin played lawyer Jon Russell in the ABC soap opera television series One Life to Live from 1986 to 1989, reprising the role from 1991 to 1992, and in General Hospital in 1991. From 1997 to 1999, he played Hank Cummings in the NBC soap opera television series Sunset Beach, and he played Frederick Hodges in The Young and the Restless from 2002 to 2005. His character was the husband of Anita Hodges (Mitzi Kapture) and father of Brittany Hodges (Lauren Woodland).

In 2010, Martin played physician Bill Horton in the NBC soap opera television series Days of Our Lives, and from 2013 to 2014, he played Ron Mitchell in the ABC mystery drama television series Mistresses. Aside from his acting career, he ran a private investment consulting firm for actors, directors, and rock stars from 1997 to 2011.
