= The Rockford Files season 2 =

The Rockford Files
- Season 2
- No. of episodes: 22

Release
- Original network: NBC
- Original release: September 12, 1975 – March 19, 1976

Season chronology
- ← Previous; Season 1 Next → Season 3

The second season of The Rockford Files originally aired Fridays at 9:00-10:00 pm on NBC from September 12, 1975 to March 19, 1976.

The Mike Post and Pete Carpenter theme "The Rockford Files" won a Grammy for Best Instrumental Arrangement in 1975 and spent 4 months on the Billboard charts, peaking at #10.

Issac Hayes makes his first appearance as Jim Rockford's former cellmate, Grady, in season 2's episode "The Hammer of C Block."Other guest stars in season 2 included Linda Evans and Stefanie Powers.

== Episodes ==
No. overall	No. in season	Title	Directed by	Written by	Original release date
24	1	"The Aaron Ironwood School of Success"	Lou Antonio	Stephen J. Cannell	September 12, 1975
Rockford is suspicious but goes along with it when close childhood friend Aaron Ironwood (James Hampton), a successful franchise salesman, asks him to sign on as the official head of Aaron’s business empire. It gets Rockford in big trouble with gangsters Aaron had cheated. With Ken Swofford, Jonathan Goldsmith, Robert Broyles, Jerome Guardino and John Petlock.
25	2	"The Farnsworth Stratagem"	Lawrence Doheny	Juanita Bartlett	September 19, 1975
When his friend Sgt. Becker (Joe Santos) becomes a victim of con artists, Rockford comes up with a convoluted scheme of his own to get the money back. However, in addition to fooling the con artists there are also mob members on the scene who Rockford needs to placate. With guest stars Linda Evans, Paul Jenkins, Gerald McRaney, H.M. Wynant, John Crawford and Eric Server.
26	3	"Gearjammers: Part 1"	William Wiard	Story by : Stephen J. Cannell; Teleplay by : Don Carlos Dunaway	September 26, 1975
Rocky Sr. is targeted when he sees something he shouldn’t while walking through the offices of a trucking company. A friend, Johnny Lo Salvo (Ted Gehring), protects him, but soon afterward the friend’s dead body is discovered in a crate being shipped overseas. Jim is anxious to protect Rocky, but there are facets of his father’s life that Jim knows nothing about, and it takes him a while just to find Rocky. Shortly after he does, Jim’s car gets blown up. Things have become deadly serious for the Rockfords, and neither knows why. With guests Scott Brady, Rosemary DeCamp, Peter Brocco, Charles Cooper, Bob Hoy and John Dullaghan.
27	4	"Gearjammers: Part 2"	William Wiard	Story by : Stephen J. Cannell; Teleplay by : Don Carlos Dunaway	October 3, 1975
The Rockfords work with Sgt. Becker to solve Johnny Lo Salvo's murder, and Jim investigates the truck company. Six tractor trailers of cargo are hijacked, but the shipments (including underwear, grapefruit, work gloves, Geiger counters and dynamite) seem unconnected, and in any case all the trailers are soon located with all the products still in them. The purpose of the hijackings eventually becomes clear, and Rocky realizes what a good friend Lo Salvo was. With Scott Brady, Jack Kruschen, Joe E. Tata and Bob Hoy.
28	5	"The Deep Blue Sleep"	William Wiard	Story by : Chas. Floyd Johnson; Teleplay by : Juanita Bartlett	October 10, 1975
A model is found dead after making a frantic phone call to both Beth (Gretchen Corbett) and Rockford. It leads to Jim’s introduction to the fashion world, replete with dicey legal papers, mobsters and money launderers. Featuring Janet MacLachlan, Robert Webber, Michael Conrad, Melendy Britt, John Furlong and Ric Mancini, and with Robert Hays in a small role.
29	6	"The Great Blue Lake Land and Development Company"	Lawrence Doheny	Juanita Bartlett	October 17, 1975
Rockford gets stranded in a desert town and his client’s $10,000 bond money gets stolen. Rockford schemes to get it back, only to have it returned without fuss – but then on his way out of town he gets charged with a real estate salesman’s murder. With Dana Elcar, Bob Hastings, Dennis Patrick, Richard B. Shull, Noble Willingham, Bartine Burkett and Ray Girardin.
30	7	"The Real Easy Red Dog"	Ivan Dixon	Stephen J. Cannell	October 31, 1975
A woman (Stefanie Powers) hires Rockford to look into a supposed suicide, but she’s really a P.I. with no connection to the dead person, trying to misdirect the police away from her case. It’s a relatively innocent ruse, except it gets them in trouble with Lieutenant Diehl (Tom Atkins), and Rockford’s investigation reveals the death was actually murder. With Sherry Jackson, Bruce Kirby, George Wyner, Lawrence Cook and Wayne Grace.
31	8	"Resurrection in Black and White"	Russ Mayberry	Juanita Bartlett and Stephen J. Cannell	November 7, 1975
A journalist, Susan Alexander (Joan Van Ark), hires Rockford to clear a man (John Lawlor) convicted of murder, but they don’t have a good way to start investigating as the police case file has disappeared. Susan learns first-hand that Jim’s sly approach to asking questions gets good results, but even after someone takes a shot at them they don’t have a lead. With William Prince, Sandra Smith and Milton Selzer.
32	9	"Chicken Little Is a Little Chicken"	Lawrence Doheny	Stephen J. Cannell	November 14, 1975
Angel (Stuart Margolin) has earned some quick cash and hires Rockford to collect, but withholds all the important information about how he came into it. Soon a swindler ends up dead and a gangster wants to teach Angel and Jim a hard lesson about running a con on the gangster’s territory. With Frank Campanella, Ray Danton, Charles Horvath and Sandy Ward.
33	10	"2 Into 5.56 Won't Go"	Jeannot Szwarc	Stephen J. Cannell	November 21, 1975
Rockford’s commanding officer (Frank Maxwell) from his army days is killed after contacting Jim for the first time in many years, and Jim’s explanation is not believed by a military investigator (Mitchell Ryan) or the colonel’s distraught adult daughter (Jesse Welles). With Charles Napier, William Boyett, Eddie Firestone, Kenneth Washington and John Kerry.
34	11	"Pastoria Prime Pick"	Lawrence Doheny	Gordon Dawson	November 28, 1975
Rockford has car trouble while passing through a thriving small town. Forced to rent a motel room for the night, he finds himself in increasingly serious criminal situations, with some of the town's most powerful people, including the sheriff (Richard Herd) and mayor (Kathie Browne), ready to testify against him. With William Lucking, Bill Zuckert, Smith Wordes, Bill Quinn and Warren J. Kemmerling. James Garner's older brother, Jack, also makes a guest appearance.
35	12	"The Reincarnation of Angie"	Jerry London	Stephen J. Cannell	December 5, 1975
Angela Perris (Elayne Heilveil), a young lady with no money, hires Rockford to find her devoted brother, a stockbroker who turns out to have been involved in half a million dollars' worth of forged stock certificates. It leaves Rockford having to deal with real and fake federal agents, illicit cash, a mysterious safe deposit box, and later with Angela being kidnapped. With David Huddleston, Wayne Tippit, Sharon Spelman, Charles Siebert, Jenny O'Hara, Jeanne Bates, Eugene Peterson and Louise Lewis.
36	13	"The Girl in the Bay City Boys Club"	James Garner	Juanita Bartlett	December 19, 1975
Rockford is hired to play in a possibly rigged poker game by a man who, he later learns, isn’t who he claims to be. After the game Jim is followed by a woman who also lies to him about her identity. They turn out to be deputy district attorneys Burton Kimball (Stewart Moss) and Kate Doyle (Blair Brown), which is the least of Jim’s troubles, as well-dressed mobsters are very interested in having the poker games continue, and soon afterwards Kimball ends up dead. With Joel Fabiani, Paul Stevens, William Edward Phipps, William Bryant, Byron Morrow, Julio Medina, Stacy Keach Sr. and Sharon Ullrick. James Garner's older brother, Jack, again makes a guest appearance.
37	14	"The Hammer of C Block"	Jerry London	Gordon Dawson	January 9, 1976
Fierce ex-con Gandolph Fitch (Isaac Hayes), just out of prison, will forgive a debt Rockford owes him if Jim investigates the 20-year-old murder of Fitch’s girlfriend, for which Fitch got convicted. Rockford’s reluctant search has him interviewing Fitch’s gangster ex-boss (Allan Rich) and tracking down the girlfriend’s ex-best friend (Lynn Hamilton). Meanwhile two other people, including a policeman, are plotting something against Fitch. With Annazette Chase, James A. Watson Jr., William "Bill" Walker and Jack Somack.
38	15	"The No-Cut Contract"	Lou Antonio	Stephen J. Cannell	January 16, 1976
A dunderheaded quarterback (Rob Reiner) for a minor league football team takes the heat off himself by having mobsters and federal agents go after Rockford instead. Later he claims he saw Rockford kill the team manager. With Angel Martin (Stuart Margolin) in a prominent role, also featuring Wayne Tippit and Milt Kogan, and with Dick Butkus appearing as himself.
39	16	"A Portrait of Elizabeth"	Meta Rosenberg	Stephen J. Cannell	January 23, 1976
Beth (Gretchen Corbett) is very attracted to debonair corporate executive Dave Delaroux (John Saxon). When he hires Rockford to investigate suspicious financial dealings at one of his branch offices, the only thing Jim finds wrong is his own vague suspicions about Dave. Jim may just be jealous, but when two people are killed in Rockford’s trailer he has to find Delaroux and hold him for the police, and Dave is very skilled at karate and at going underground. With Katherine Woodville, Cynthia Sykes, James Murtaugh, Wayne Tippit, Joe E. Tata, Peggy Stewart and Angus Duncan.
40	17	"Joey Blue Eyes"	Lawrence Doheny	Walter Dallenbach	January 30, 1976
Shifty corporate executives led by Burt Stryker (James Luisi) look to take over the restaurant of ex-con Joseph DiMinna (Michael Ansara) just when it's expanding into franchises. Rockford is browbeaten by Beth to take the case, but he and DiMinna succeed only in hating each other. Includes Angel Martin (Stuart Margolin) in an important role, also featuring Suzanne Charny, Eddie Fontaine, Sandy Kenyon, Mike Lane, Norman Bartold, Robert Yuro and Jimmy Lydon. Luisi returned the next season as Rockford-hating Lieutenant Chapman, a role he played for the rest of the show’s run.
41	18	"In Hazard"	Jackie Cooper	Juanita Bartlett	February 6, 1976
A shady stockbroker (Joseph Campanella) who has been cheating the mob is a client of Beth (Gretchen Corbett), which, since he gave her a secret letter to keep in her safe, may be fatal to her. With Richard Venture, Melendy Britt, Frank Campanella, Linda Dano, Ben Frank, Joe E. Tata, Ann Weldon and Skip Ward.
42	19	"The Italian Bird Fiasco"	Jackie Cooper	Edward J. Lakso	February 13, 1976
Rockford is hired by crooked art collector Thomas Caine (William Daniels) to bid on three wooden bird sculptures that have come on the market. Also wanting them is a beautiful expert on wooden birds (Camilla Sparv), and there is a dead body in their recent past. With Ron Silver, William Jordan, Peter Palmer, Ivor Barry and Karl Lukas.
43	20	"Where's Houston?"	Lawrence Doheny	Don Carlos Dunaway	February 20, 1976
Rocky’s friend (Dabbs Greer) is murdered and the friend’s granddaughter (Lane Bradbury) may have been kidnapped, but there’s very little evidence to persuade Lieutenant Diehl (Tom Atkins) to investigate. So Rockford and Rocky (Noah Beery Jr.) do the digging. With Robert Mandan, Del Monroe, Dabbs Greer, Raymond O'Keefe, Rodolfo Hoyos Jr., Thomas Bellin, and Murray MacLeod.
44	21	"Foul on the First Play"	Lou Antonio	Story by : Chas. Floyd Johnson and Dorothy J. Bailey; Teleplay by : Stephen J. Cannell	March 12, 1976
Rockford’s old parole agent, Marcus Aurelius Hayes (Louis Gossett Jr.), still pretending to have that job, hires Jim with a fake story that gets Jim beat up. Hayes then follows the assailants to find out who their boss is. It’s his way of finding out who is putting pressure on the commissioner of a basketball league. Things come to a head when Rockford learns that Hayes has become a private investigator, and then the commissioner is murdered. With David White, Al Ruscio, Pepper Martin, Jayne Kennedy, Richard Davalos, Chuck Bowman, Ji-Tu Cumbuka, Al Checco, John Mahon, and James Ingersoll.
45	22	"A Bad Deal in the Valley"	Jerry London	Donald L. Gold & Lester Wm. Berke	March 19, 1976
Jim delivers a package for an old flame, Karen Stiles (Susan Strasberg). When it turns out to be $100,000 in counterfeit bills and he is arrested by Federal authorities, his only way clear is to solve the case himself. Things get further complicated by a kidnapping, a divorce, and a home break-in that netted valuable jewels. With Veronica Hamel, Jack Colvin, Rod Cameron, John Lupton, Gordon Jump, Fritzi Burr, Laurence Haddon, David Sabin and Russ McGinn.
