= The Rockford Files season 6 =

The Rockford Files
- Season 6
- No. of episodes: 12

Release
- Original network: NBC
- Original release: September 28, 1979 – January 10, 1980

Season chronology
- ← Previous; Season 5

The sixth and final season of The Rockford Files aired Friday nights on NBC from September 28 to December 14, 1979. The final episode aired Thursday, January 10, 1980. Garner returned to the character in eight television movies broadcast by CBS from 1994 to 1999.

== Episodes ==
No. overall	No. in season	Title	Directed by	Written by	Original release date
112	1	"Paradise Cove"	Stephen J. Cannell	Stephen J. Cannell	September 28, 1979
A crusty old ex-sheriff, C.C. Calloway (Leif Erickson), is doing everything he can to get Rockford kicked out of the neighborhood (complete with recording action that had occurred around Rockford's trailer such as gunfire). He has already won a $35,000 legal judgment against Rockford after an accident, causing the court to appoint Althea Morgan (Mariette Hartley) to examine Rockford’s finances. At a meeting of the neighbors of the cove where Calloway tries to make a vote to expel Rockford, Morgan maneuvers the local residents into making him the security guard for the cove against his wishes. While on the job, Rockford locks horns with a trio of midnight diggers on the beach, and learns there may be a stolen horde of gold bullion from the 1930s buried under his trailer connected to Calloway, who along with his relative is also looking for the gold. With Byron Morrow, John Davey, Branscombe Richmond, Christine Avila, Raymond O'Keefe, Jerry Summers and Tony Brubaker.
113	2	"Lions, Tigers, Monkeys and Dogs"	William Wiard	Juanita Bartlett	October 12, 1979
114	3	"Lions, Tigers, Monkeys and Dogs"	William Wiard	Juanita Bartlett	October 12, 1979
A socialite princess, Irene Rachevsky (Dana Wynter), hires Rockford to secretly guard her friend, Kendall Warren (Lauren Bacall), who is being stalked. It astounds Jim to learn that Kendall lives the good life despite having no money and no job. One man attacks Kendall and is later killed when he falls off a building, but Rockford is convinced he was working for someone else. As Jim and Kendall grow closer to one another and look further into the attack they draw the ire of mid-level Mob boss Tommy Manette (Carmine Caridi). After Manette is killed, the increasing body count sets Rockford against Lieutenant Chapman (James Luisi), but Kendall is able to handle him. Using Rocky's home as a safe house, Kendall is attacked in her bedroom, but Jim saves her. The assailant is the publisher of a gossip magazine, Gus Fairfield (Michael Lombard), who says Princess Rachevsky put pressure on him to kill Kendall. The princess denies it and it seems unlikely, as she had hired Rockford to protect Kendall in the first place. Rockford is not sure what to make of it all. With Ed Nelson, Leo Gordon, Julie Parrish, Jon Cedar, Corinne Camacho, Michael Des Barres, Charlie Picerni, Nicholas Worth, Wally Taylor, Roger Til, Abel Franco, Alfred Dennis, Harold Ayer, Ken DuMain, Robert Hitchcock, Kathryn Janssen, and Hank Robinson.
115	4	"Only Rock 'n' Roll Will Never Die: Part 1"	William Wiard	David Chase	October 19, 1979
Rockford’s hangdog friend Eddie (George Loros) recommends Jim to his boss, rock and roll star Tim Ritchie (Kristoffer Tabori), to look for Brian Charles, Tim’s ex-bandmate, who has gone missing and has a spotty history of drug use and iffy associations. Rockford would not be interested in the gig except he’s being paid twice his usual rate. Meanwhile a smart and attractive reporter, Whitney Cox (Marcia Strassman), is wandering freely over the estate of the rock star, who is in the middle of contested settlement proceedings with an ex. Eddie has a huge crush on Whitney, but she has eyes for Tim. Rockford’s investigation turns up little, he is assaulted, and Ritchie has been hiding information from him, so he quits. Everyone is disappointed: Jim does not get paid, Brian does not get found, and Eddie gets fired because his recommendation fell flat. Later a drunken Eddie confronts a frustrated Jim outside his trailer and they quarrel, until someone shoots at them. With Lenny Baker, Stanley Brock, Leigh Christian, Michael Champion, Jesse Dizon and Jean-Paul Vignon.
116	5	"Only Rock 'n' Roll Will Never Die: Part 2"	William Wiard	David Chase	October 26, 1979
Rockford and Eddie (George Loros) continue to investigate. Their search has them coming across such record industry staples as egotistical producers and rockers’ ex-lovers, but their best lead is when they learn the missing Brian had passed a recording master of Tim Ritchie’s latest opus to shady industry man Bernie Seldon (Stanley Brock), and the market was subsequently flooded by bootleg albums. Rockford links it to other bits of information he’d learned, and he and Eddie and Whitney (Marcia Strassman) find Brian’s body buried in his garden where he lived. Jim has a meaningful conversation with the grieving Tim Ritchie (Kristoffer Tabori). Later the news reports that Seldon has been charged with musical piracy, but no-one has a good idea who killed Brian. Watching, Rockford (with Rocky) and Whitney (with Eddie) have simultaneous realizations on who did it, and head off to prove it. With Lenny Baker, Leigh Christian, Michael Champion, Jesse Dizon and Jean-Paul Vignon.
117	6	"Love Is the Word" "Some Things You Can Tell Yourself"	John Patterson	David Chase	November 9, 1979
Rockford is asked by on-again off-again flame Megan Dougherty (Kathryn Harrold) to clear a man, Jeffrey Smith (Anthony Herrera), suspected of serious offenses. The emotional complications soar when she reveals she and Jeff are engaged. The case complications follow when Jeff disappears and is suspected of murder. Featuring David Carroll, Van Williams, Richard Cox, David Cadiente, and a brief scene of Barbara Mandrell in concert.
118	7	"Nice Guys Finish Dead"	John Patterson	Stephen J. Cannell	November 16, 1979
Rockford has been named the Investigator of the Year for some obscure clerical comparisons he made. A state senator is murdered at the annual P.I. dinner where Jim is to receive his award, and the hapless Freddie Beamer (James Whitmore Jr.) is the prime suspect. Rockford bails out Beamer and agrees to help him clear his name, but also in Freddie's camp is true blue investigator Lance White (Tom Selleck), to whom clues and solved cases and everyone but Rockford’s high praises come effortlessly. With Simon Oakland, Larry Manetti, Fritzi Burr, Roscoe Born and Erica Hagen. NOTE: 13 months after this episode, Magnum P.I with Selleck and Manetti premiered on December 11, 1980.
119	8	"The Hawaiian Headache"	William Wiard	Stephen J. Cannell	November 23, 1979
Jim is Rocky’s guest on a Hawaiian vacation he won in the mail. But as soon as Jim arrives in Honolulu his old army commander (Ken Swofford) enlists him on a secret “routine” intelligence errand. When it goes awry it leaves a mess involving a dead agent, a lost case of money, Jim having been drugged by Vietnamese spies with guns, a surprise appearance by Angel and Dennis, and Rocky furious at Jim (with a bullet in his arm) for ruining his vacation. With Danny Kamekona, Christopher Cary, James Murtaugh and W.K. Stratton.
120	9	"No Fault Affair"	Corey Allen	Juanita Bartlett	November 30, 1979
Rita Capkovic (Rita Moreno) escapes her sadistic pimp (Jerry Douglas) and goes to hide out at Rockford’s, but her plans for a new career fall through and she becomes disillusioned. The pimp tracks her down and gets her to go back to working for him by threatening to kill Rockford. Jim gets Angel’s help in finding her, which sets the stage for the final confrontation. With Corinne Camacho, Iggie Wolfington, William Beckley, Jillian Kesner-Graver and Michael Jeffers.
121	10	"The Big Cheese"	Joseph Pevney	Shel Willens	December 7, 1979
A reporter friend Eddie Hellinger (Francis X. McCarthy) phones Rockford and tells him to expect an important package in the mail. Mobster Chuck Ryan (Alan Manson) wants the package at all costs and sends a couple of thugs to Rockford’s home every day to await the mail’s arrival. Rockford goes searching for Eddie but learns he has been killed. Rockford is told by Sally Packard (Constance Towers), who has some inside knowledge on what’s going on, that he was working on a series of articles about the mobster. Things make sense until the package arrives and it is nothing but a big cheese, which leaves a mystery for Rockford and Sally to solve. With Ben Andrews, Eldon Quick, Bill McLean, Hank Brandt, George Pentecost and Alan Manson. This episode features the last appearance in the original series of Rocky (Noah Beery Jr.), Chapman (James Luisi), Becker (Joe Santos) and Angel (Stuart Margolin). The latter two reappeared in the 'I Still Love LA' TV movie of 1994.
122	11	"Just a Coupla Guys"	Ivan Dixon	David Chase	December 14, 1979
Rockford is flown to New Jersey, but when he learns the case involves organized crime figures he wants no part of it. As circumstances unfold Rockford ends up advising a born again ex-mafia don, Joseph Lombard (Gilbert Green), on a matter that involves a dead body that was stolen in its casket. Also around are two neighbourhood toughs, Eugene (Greg Antonacci) and Mickey (Gene Davis), who have latched onto Lombard believing he is their ticket to becoming ‘connected’. They’re not overly bright, but may have stumbled across the path of a hired killer, in town on business. With Antony Ponzini, Simon Oakland, Arch Johnson, Robin Riker, Cliff Carnel, Jennifer Rhodes, Dean Wein, Eric Sinclair and Vince Howard.
123	12	"Deadlock in Parma"	Winrich Kolbe	Story by : Donald L. Gold & Lester Wm. Berke; Teleplay by : Donald L. Gold & Lester Wm. Berke and Rudolph Borchert	January 10, 1980
While on a fishing trip Rockford gets swindled into casting a proxy vote on a law that would sneak legalized gambling into the town of Parma. Jim finds himself with his hands full having to deal with an unseasoned journalist looking for a story, a corrupt sheriff who runs him out of town, and two sets of gangsters on opposite sides of the issue, both leaning on him to vote their way. With Jerry Hardin, Henry Beckman, Ben Piazza, Michael Cavanaugh, J. Edward McKinley, Virgil Frye, Gary Grubbs, Joseph Sirola and Sandra Kerns.
