= The Rockford Files season 3 =

The Rockford Files
- Season 3
- No. of episodes: 22

Release
- Original network: NBC
- Original release: September 24, 1976 – April 1, 1977

Season chronology
- ← Previous; Season 2 Next → Season 4

The third season of The Rockford Files originally aired Fridays at 9:00-10:00 pm on NBC from September 24, 1976 to April 1, 1977.

Issac Hayes and Lou Gosset Jr. appear as a guest stars in the episode "Just Another Polish Wedding." It was Hayes second appearance on The Rockford Files as Jim Rockford's former cellmate Grandy. Other notable guest stars this season include Burt Young, Robert Loggia, Avery Schrieber, Stacey Keach Sr., and Ned Beatty.

== Episodes ==
No. overall	No. in season	Title	Directed by	Written by	Original release date
46	1	"The Fourth Man"	William Wiard	Juanita Bartlett	September 24, 1976
Rockford’s friend, airline booking agent Lori Jenivan (Sharon Gless), is convinced that respectable seeming coin dealer Timson Farrell (John McMartin) wants to kill her. Rockford gets both Angel (Stuart Margolin) and Dennis Becker (Joe Santos) on the case to no effect, and what could be the motive? With Michael Bell and Barbara Collentine.
47	2	"The Oracle Wore a Cashmere Suit"	Russ Mayberry	David Chase	October 1, 1976
Unscrupulous Roman Clementi (Robert Webber), who bills himself as a psychic investigator, tells the police Rockford knows more about a missing record company executive than he has told. It gets Rockford in trouble with the police and also with the drug dealers the executive owed money to. With Robert Walden, Pepe Serna, James Hong, Bonnie Bartlett, Diane Sommerfield and John Furlong.
48	3	"The Family Hour"	William Wiard	Gordon Dawson	October 8, 1976
Jim and Rocky bond with a young girl (Kim Richards) whose father is on the run from violent narcotics dealers who operate with apparent impunity. With Burt Young, Ken Swofford, Paul Koslo, Janice Carroll, Adrian Ricard, Fred Lerner and George Tracy.
49	4	"Feeding Frenzy"	Russ Mayberry	Story by : Lester Wm. Berke & Donald L. Gold; Teleplay by : Stephen J. Cannell	October 15, 1976
The father (Eddie Firestone) of Sandy, a former flame of Rockford, asks Jim to return the half-million dollars the father stole three years ago. Jim mistakenly thinks the statute of limitations has run out on the crime, so gets in trouble with a police lieutenant still interested in the case. Then Sandy (Susan Howard) gets kidnapped by thugs wanting the money. With Luke Askew, William Edward Phipps, George Wyner, Pepper Martin, Roger Aaron Brown, Carmen Argenziano, John Dennis Johnston, Tony Epper, Jon Cedar and Richard LePore.
50	5	"Drought at Indianhead River"	Lawrence Doheny	Stephen J. Cannell	November 5, 1976
Rockford gets wind that some mobsters are planning to kill Angel, and when he tracks Angel (Stuart Margolin) down to warn him finds him living the high life in a penthouse apartment. The mobsters frame them for murder, and then decide to kill them both. With Robert Loggia, Vincent Baggetta, Antony Carbone, Nicholas Georgiade, Jerome Guardino and Laurence Haddon.
51	6	"Coulter City Wildcat"	Russ Mayberry	Don Carlos Dunaway	November 12, 1976
Rocky wins an oil rights lottery, but a couple of thugs assault him to force him to sign over the rights to them. With Dennis Burkley, John Anderson, Jerry Hardin, Noble Willingham, Hal Bokar, Richard Kennedy and Ed Deemer.
52	7	"So Help Me God"	Jeannot Szwarc	Juanita Bartlett	November 19, 1976
Rockford receives a subpoena to appear before a Grand Jury investigating the disappearance of Frank Sorvino. This episode exposes the unfairness of the Grand Jury system. Specifically: Once you answer any question, you can no longer take the 5th amendment.; If you refuse to testify (after the first question) you can be imprisoned for the duration of the Grand Jury.; Even if you invoke the 5th amendment properly, the prosecutor can still apply for "immunity" from the 5th amendment and subpoena you again and require you to testify.; Jim was asked about a telephone conversation he supposedly had with Frank Sorvino the day he disappeared, but Jim testified that the conversation never took place. But the Feds have a deposition from Sorvino's secretary saying she dialed the number and Jim answered, and Frank talked to him. The second time Jim invokes the 5th correctly and the prosecutor, Gary Bevins (William Daniels), dismisses Rockford and says he will apply for immunity from the 5th. Jim makes an angry speech attacking Bevins personally for violating his rights and having more contempt for the law than anyone Jim did time with. (Bevins told the Grand Jury that Jim had a record, but wouldn't acknowledge the fact that he received a full pardon.) Jim was cited for contempt and ends up back in the slammer. Angel visits Jim there with a photograph of the camera shy Frank Sorvino for which he charges $50, and Jim recognizes Sorvino as his client George Capmann, and all becomes clear. Jim is viciously attacked in prison by Sorvino's goons to stop him testifying and ends up in hospital. All charges are dropped and Jim testifies to what he now knows, which is probably enough to indict Sorvino, but Gary Bevins is ungrateful. Rockford is dismissed, but the foreman allows him to make a final statement in which he quotes from an article he read in prison to the effect that any injustice, no matter how small, hurts all of us. When Bevins doesn't get the point, Jim reveals that the article was quoting him. A printed statement appears on the screen to the effect that the laws regarding Grand Juries allow the injustices portrayed here to occur.
53	8	"Rattlers' Class of '63"	Meta Rosenberg	David Chase	November 26, 1976
Rockford is best man at Angel’s wedding, but Angel (Stuart Margolin) is only getting married because he needs his new wife (Elayne Heilveil) to defend him from her brothers after he and an associate scammed them out of $5,000. When the associate and one of the brothers turn up dead and Rockford is implicated in the con, Jim has no choice but to solve the case himself. With Avery Schreiber, James Wainwright, Rudy Ramos, Sandra Kerns, Stacy Keach Sr., Stanley Brock, Gerald McRaney and John Durren.
54	9	"Return to the Thirty-Eighth Parallel"	Bruce Kessler	Walter Dallenbach	December 10, 1976
Unemployed old army buddy Brennan (Ned Beatty) urges a reluctant Rockford to accept a case searching for a woman’s missing sister, then talks Jim into allowing him to assist in the investigation. On the first day Brennan assaults a man and gets Jim in trouble with the IRS. Their relationship gets more strained when Brennan turns out to be a fellow private investigator on a case involving a stolen $3 million vase that a devious art collector (Paul Stevens) is also interested in. With Veronica Hamel, Norman Burton, Robert Karnes, Bart Burns, James Congdon, Jeff David and John Mahon.
55	10	"Piece Work"	Lawrence Doheny	Juanita Bartlett	December 17, 1976
Rockford is hired to investigate an accident at a health club, but the place is a hangout for illegal arms dealers, and Murray Rosner (Michael Lerner), the pivotal figure in the buying and selling of the weapons, thinks Jim is a police officer and wants him out of the picture. With Ben Frank, Frank Maxwell, Jack Bannon, Simon Scott, Harvey Vernon and Ned Wilson.
56	11	"The Trouble with Warren"	Christian I. Nyby II	Juanita Bartlett	December 24, 1976
Everybody loves Beth’s clean-cut cousin, Warren Weeks (Ron Rifkin), but when his boss is murdered Jim racks up felonies trying to help him. Later a second executive at the multinational corporation where Weeks worked is killed, and Warren was having an affair with his wife. When he flees the scene with Jim in tow, the charges against Rockford keep mounting. With Paul Jenkins, Joe Maross, Tom Bower, Anne Randall and John Dullaghan.
57	12	"There's One in Every Port"	Meta Rosenberg	Stephen J. Cannell	January 7, 1977
An old prison buddy (Howard Duff) and his daughter (Joan Van Ark) trick Rockford into inadvertently setting up a mob-run poker game to get robbed. To get the money back Rockford co-opts their next con, involving the sale of a yacht they do not own. But Rockford only has a few days to make it work, and mobsters and crooks do not respect maritime law. With John Dehner, Steve Landesberg, Jack Riley, George Memmoli, Michael DeLano, Byron Morrow and John Mahon.
58	13	"Sticks and Stones May Break Your Bones, but Waterbury Will Bury You"	Jerry London	David Chase	January 14, 1977
When several independent private investigators (Cleavon Little, Simon Oakland and Val Bisoglio) get set up so that they do something that gets their licences revoked, Rockford takes up their cause. With James Karen, Jim Storm, Linda Dano, Fritzi Burr, George Pentecost, Anthony Costello and Robert Riesel.
59	14	"The Trees, the Bees and T.T. Flowers: Part 1"	Jerry London	Gordon Dawson	January 21, 1977
T.T. Flowers (Strother Martin) is an eccentric older friend of Rocky. Flowers is committed against his will to a psychiatric institution and given drugs by a complicit doctor to make him paranoid and delusional, so that his daughter (Karen Machon) and son-in-law (Alex Rocco) can take control of his estate, which includes ten acres of prime development property. When Rockford intervenes they try to kill him. Out of options and desperate, Jim's last resort is to break Flowers out of the institution. With Scott Brady, Richard Venture, Roy Jenson, Jack Stauffer, Bob Hastings, Paul Sylvan and Fred Stuthman.
60	15	"The Trees, the Bees and T.T. Flowers: Part 2"	Jerry London	Gordon Dawson	January 28, 1977
T.T. Flowers (Strother Martin) arms himself and threatens to shoot anyone who sets foot on his property. A SWAT team is called in but eventually cooler heads prevail, and then T.T’s daughter is persuaded to reconsider institutionalizing him. This so frustrates Jack Muellard (Scott Brady), the developer who wants to take possession of the land, who had been the prime mover in everything, that he plans murder and other violence to secure his ends. With Alex Rocco, Karen Machon, Roy Jenson, Jack Stauffer, Robert DoQui, Tom Rosqui, Fred Stuthman and Dave Shelley.
61	16	"The Becker Connection"	Reza Badiyi	Story by : Chas. Floyd Johnson and Ted Harris; Teleplay by : Juanita Bartlett	February 11, 1977
Drug dealers steal confiscated heroin from a police property room and frame financially strapped Dennis Becker (Joe Santos) for it. Things get worse for Dennis when Rockford tries to clear him. With James Luisi, Jack Carter, Bert Kramer, William Jordan, Pat Finley, Jack Kelly and James Sikking.
62	17	"Just Another Polish Wedding"	William Wiard	Stephen J. Cannell	February 18, 1977
Jim's ex-con buddy Gandolph Fitch (Isaac Hayes) is looking for a new line of work. Jim teams Fitch with the slick P.I. Marcus Aurelius Hayes (Louis Gossett Jr.), who learns from Fitch that Rockford has been hired by the county to do a probate heir search for a man who has inherited a fortune. Hayes decides to take up the case, confident that he can beat Rockford to the man and then trick him out of a chunk of the inheritance. They do not know the money is dirty and the mob is also after it. With Dennis Burkley, George Wyner, Pepper Martin, Walter Brooke, Jack Collins, Melendy Britt, Raymond Singer, Anthony Charnota, Sidney Clute, George Skaff, Barney McFadden and Fred Koska.
63	18	"New Life, Old Dragons"	Jeannot Szwarc	Story by : Bernard Rollins & Leroy Robinson; Teleplay by : David C. Taylor	February 25, 1977
A Vietnamese woman (Irene Yah-Ling Sun) hires Rockford to find her missing brother, who, like her, came to America as a refugee. The case becomes one of abduction and assault and then murder, and there are multiple military veterans from the Vietnam War involved. With Charles Napier, Kathleen Nolan, James T. Callahan, Luke Askew, Clyde Kusatsu, Jim Ishida and Charles Siebert.
64	19	"To Protect and Serve: Part 1"	William Wiard	David Chase	March 11, 1977
Rockford is hired by east coast attorney Michael Kelly (Jon Cypher) to track down his fiancée, Patsy Fossler (Leslie Charleson). Unbeknownst to Rockford two hired killers (George Loros and Luke Andreas) are after her as well, and the L.A. police are interested in Kelly. Meanwhile a lonely police groupie, Lianne Sweeny (Joyce Van Patten), has attached herself to Denis Becker and her attempts to get closer to him is causing a strain on his personal and professional relationships.
65	20	"To Protect and Serve: Part 2"	William Wiard	David Chase	March 18, 1977
Rockford hides Patsy Fossler (Leslie Charleson) with a friend (Lou Frizzell) and fools Michael Kelly (Jon Cypher) with a story that convinces him to fly back east right away. However Lianne Sweeny (Joyce Van Patten) has learned the details of Fossler’s hideout, and the killers (George Loros and Luke Andreas) have no trouble getting the information out of her. With Charles Bateman and Angus Duncan.
66	21	"Crack Back"	Reza Badiyi	Juanita Bartlett	March 25, 1977
Beth’s client is a football player, David Woodhull (Howard McGillin), accused of murder. She hires Rockford to locate his alibi, a married woman, Doreen Carpenter (Sondra Blake). During Woodhull’s trial, which takes place while Jim is doing his search, Beth (Gretchen Corbett) is receiving increasingly disturbing telephone calls and gifts. With Joseph Mascolo, Conchata Ferrell, Norman Bartold and John Calvin.
67	22	"Dirty Money, Black Light"	Stuart Margolin	David C. Taylor	April 1, 1977
Rocky, on vacation in Hawaii, is sent $44,000 in cash, which Jim has to deal with when he checks Rocky's mail for bills. The windfall forces Jim to deal with Federal agents, organized hoods, a loan shark operation, and the moral failings of Angel Martin (Stuart Margolin). With John P. Ryan, Roger E. Mosley, Wesley Addy, Joshua Bryant, Martin Kove, Diana Ewing and Victor Argo.
