= The Rockford Files season 4 =

The Rockford Files
- Season 4
- No. of episodes: 22

Release
- Original network: NBC
- Original release: September 16, 1977 – February 24, 1978

Season chronology
- ← Previous; Season 3 Next → Season 5

The fourth season of The Rockford Files originally aired Fridays at 9:00-10:00 pm on NBC from September 16, 1977 to February 24, 1978.

Rita Moreno won an Emmy for Outstanding Lead Actress for a Single Appearance in a Drama or Comedy Series for the season 4 episode "The Paper Palace." Other notable season 4 guest stars include Robert Loggia, Rick Springfield and Howard Hessman.

== Episodes ==
No. overall	No. in season	Title	Directed by	Written by	Original release date
68	1	"Beamer's Last Case"	Stephen J. Cannell	Story by : Booker Bradshaw & Calvin Kelly; Teleplay by : Stephen J. Cannell	September 16, 1977
Back from a vacation, Rockford discovers that someone has been living in his trailer, wearing his clothes, racking up purchases with his credit cards, smashed up his car, and got him in trouble with the police. The person has also been pretending to be Rockford on cases, accepting new clients and infuriating them with his incompetence. With James Whitmore Jr., Jack Kelly, Bibi Besch, Robert Loggia, Carlene Watkins, John Davey, Paula Victor, Raymond O'Keefe, Howard George and Cal Bellini.
69	2	"Trouble in Chapter 17"	William Wiard	Juanita Bartlett	September 23, 1977
Rockford’s professional reputation is at stake when a publicity-seeking anti-feminist author (Claudette Nevins) hires him to investigate threats made against her, and immediately afterward she is shot at, pushed down stairs, and her secretary is killed by someone gunning for her. With Ed Nelson, Arlene Martel, Mario Machado, Al Checco, Arthur Roberts and Donna Baccala.
70	3	"The Battle of Canoga Park"	Ivan Dixon	Juanita Bartlett	September 30, 1977
Rockford’s gun is stolen and used in a murder, which makes him a suspect to the police and a target of members of a nutty local militia group. With no leads, Jim’s suspicion falls on his new, very thorough cleaning lady and her idle adult son, if only because she knew Jim kept his gun in his cookie jar. With Nora Marlowe, Brion James, Adrienne Marden, John Dennis Johnston, Charles Hallahan, Elliott Street and Ted Gehring.
71	4	"Second Chance"	Reza Badiyi	Gordon Dawson	October 14, 1977
A recent parolee abducts the girlfriend, Theda Best (Dionne Warwick), of Rockford's penitentiary pal Gandolph Fitch (Isaac Hayes), wanting something he thinks she has. She is a talented singer whose promising career Fitch is hoping to manage. The parolee (Tony Burton) is Theda’s ex-husband, and he is working for a murderous businessman (Malachi Throne) with a number of ex-con thugs in his operation. With Vivi Janiss, Milt Oberman, Frank Christi and Sean Garrison.
72	5	"The Dog and Pony Show"	Reza Badiyi	David Chase	October 21, 1977
Angel’s attempted theft of silverware from a restaurant gets him and Rockford sentenced to take group therapy classes. In the session Mary Jo Flynn (Joanne Nail), who has a history of paranoia, says she thinks she is being followed. Jim investigates, which gets him involved with dysfunctional mobsters and the paranoid local head of a CIA-like government spy station. With Walter Brooke, George Loros, Michael Bell, Al Ruscio, Ed Lauter, Gary Crosby, Bill Quinn, Louisa Moritz and Robert Lussier.
73	6	"Requiem for a Funny Box"	William Wiard	Story by : Burt Prelutsky; Teleplay by : James Crocker	November 4, 1977
Kenny Bell (Chuck McCann), a comedian whose career is in decline, tries to hire Rockford to protect him from his still very successful ex-partner, Lee Russo (Robert Quarry). Later Kenny hires Rockford to recover, for ransom, his ‘funny box’ catalogue of jokes that has just been stolen. However when Jim goes to make the exchange he finds Russo’s dead body. Kenny denies any involvement in what Rockford was doing, so Lieutenant Diehl (Tom Atkins) is ready to pin the murder on Jim. It forces him to investigate further, and he turns up a personal connection between Russo and a leading local mobster (Jason Evers). With Meredith MacRae and Gilbert Green. This 1977 episode is notable for its depiction of the efforts high profile homosexual men would go to in that era to keep their sexual orientation secret, as well as the denial and lack of support they often received from their families.
74	7	"Quickie Nirvana"	Meta Rosenberg	David Chase	November 11, 1977
Jim allows flower child Sky Aquarian (Valerie Curtin) to get sent her last work check to his home. Before she quit she was supposed to deliver a package for her boss, but forgot. It sets off a chain of events that leaves a music fan dead and a musician’s two henchmen after Sky to recover the package, thirty thousand dollars in cash, which her guru subsequently steals from her. Rockford finds himself up to his neck in Sky’s problems, but even if he gets the money back, he and Sky know too much to be allowed to merely return it. With Quinn K. Redeker, Dick Anthony Williams, Lawrence Cook and Kip Gilman.
75	8	"Irving the Explainer"	James Coburn	David Chase	November 18, 1977
An author (Barbara Babcock) hires Rockford to track down an old Hollywood director (Paul Stewart), but she is actually after a valuable Watteau painting that went missing several decades before. Also after it are two Germans from the Nazi era, and two investigators (Maurice Marsac and Roger Etienne) from the Sûreté seeking to return the painting to France. The Germans kill the director, and there were other mysterious deaths in the painting’s recent past. But all the knowledge from all the previous investigations is not getting anyone any closer to the painting. With Byron Morrow, Irene Tsu and Alex Rodine.
76	9	"The Mayor's Committee from Deer Lick Falls"	Ivan Dixon	William R. Stratton	November 25, 1977
Four respectable seeming citizens hire Rockford to shop for a used fire engine for their town. One of them, Everet Alton Benson (Edward Binns), also hires Jim to find his niece, Lauren Ingeborg (Priscilla Barnes), who has come to L.A. to be an actress. When Rockford reports that he has found her, the four offer him $20,000 to have her killed. When Rockford reports it to the police the four deny it and file a complaint against him, which could cost Rockford his P.I. license. Meanwhile they continue to plot to kill the niece, who also does not believe Jim’s claim, and later they attempt to kill Jim too. With Charles Aidman, Jerry Hardin, Richard Sanders, Fritzi Burr, David Ruprecht, Clark Howat and Richard O'Brien.
77	10	"Hotel of Fear"	Russ Mayberry	Juanita Bartlett	December 2, 1977
Angel (Stuart Margolin) flees to Rockford’s home when he witnesses a murder, but becomes a co-operative witness when promised police protection and 24-hour room service in a hotel. The murderer, Del Kane (Madison Arnold), is a connected hitman, and the judge at the preliminary hearing has been bribed to set Kane free. Angel panics, and in trying to get on the killer’s good side tells him that Rockford learned he is in town on a contract. It guarantees that Angel and Rockford are next on the hit list. With Vincent Baggetta, Barry Atwater, Frank de Kova, Gerald McRaney, Eugene Peterson and Stephen Coit.
78	11	"Forced Retirement"	Alexander Singer	William R. Stratton	December 9, 1977
Beth's old college friend Susan Kenniston (Margie Impert) heads a company developing a breakthrough underwater robot explorer. Beth (Gretchen Corbett) has misgivings about both the accelerated testing and the newest member of the submersible team’s braintrust, Richard Lessing (Larry Hagman). She hires Rockford to check into everything, but when his Jimmy-Joe Meeker character is exposed by Angel (Stuart Margolin) it leaves everything going Lessing's way. Featuring Denny Miller, William Joyce, Ron Masak, John Davey, Conrad Bachmann and Bill Hart.
79	12	"The Queen of Peru"	Meta Rosenberg	David Chase	December 16, 1977
The noisy Wronko family from Indiana, traveling in an RV, sets up to camp next to Rockford’s trailer, but Jim is able to slyly talk the father (Ken Swofford) into not staying long. Rockford is called in as a consultant when a stolen $2 million diamond is offered to the insurance company for half price. At the exchange one of the thieves takes the ransom money and reveals he put the diamond in Rockford's barbecue grill. Jim races home but finds his barbecue missing, and realizes it was taken by the Wronkos. It leaves Jim having to explain things to Lieutenant Chapman (James Luisi) and the insurance company agent (George Wyner), and then track down the family. The two most dangerous members of the gang of thieves (Christopher Cary and Luke Andreas) are after the diamond too, having already shot one of the other gang members. With Hunter von Leer, Joe E. Tata and Paul Cavonis.
80	13	"A Deadly Maze"	William Wiard	Juanita Bartlett	December 23, 1977
Rockford is hired by a man (Larry Linville) to find his missing wife, a case he accepts only because he is offered extra money. When Jim reports potentially worrisome news the husband is more interested in asking Rockford questions than the danger his wife might be in, and again it takes extra money to keep Jim involved. Later the woman (Corinne Camacho) is murdered, and her killer might go after Rockford too. With J. Pat O'Malley, Lance Legault, Johnny Seven, Jack Collins and Cliff Carnell.
81	14	"The Attractive Nuisance"	Dana Elcar	Stephen J. Cannell	January 6, 1978
Rocky and his new friend Vincent Whitehead (Ken Lynch) have opened a truck stop diner, but the business has been a bust. Weird little things happen in and around the diner at night, and grizzled older guy Eddie LaSalle (Victor Jory), long ago retired from the FBI, is conducting surveillance on it. Meanwhile Rocky leaves a telescope on the roof of Jim's beach trailer, and when a stranger falls off the roof an ambulance-chasing lawyer sues Jim under the attractive nuisance doctrine. With Hunter von Leer, John Morgan Evans, Rudy Bond, Paul Sorensen, Jerome Guardino, Joe Tornatore and Dick Balduzzi. This episode features the last appearance of Beth Davenport (Gretchen Corbett) in the series.
82	15	"The Gang at Don's Drive-In"	Harry Falk	James Crocker	January 13, 1978
Anthony Zerbe plays Jack Skowran, an alcohol-fueled writer friend of Jim who hires him to do background research but lies about what the book is about. After being assaulted by two men who later abduct Skowran, Jim finds out the book is about a years-ago death of a teenager that involved an expensive coverup. When Jim gets too close to exposing that case one of the original witnesses (Mills Watson) hires a hit man to eliminate him. With Arlene Golonka, Richard Bakalyan, Elaine Princi, Connie Sawyer, Fredd Wayne, Jordan Rhodes, Lawrence P. Casey and Bill Fletcher.
83	16	"The Paper Palace"	Richard Crenna	Juanita Bartlett	January 20, 1978
Rockford befriends Rita Capkovic (Rita Moreno), a prostitute who sometimes works with Dennis Becker (Joe Santos). Rita hires Jim when two men attack her in her home and Lieutenant Chapman (James Luisi) refuses to investigate. Jim takes Rita to stay with a friend, Maggie Gillson (Shirley O'Hara), but when the friend is killed the only lead they have is Rita’s attackers spoke French. With Bruce Kirby, Patricia Donahue, David Lewis and James Jeter.
84	17	"Dwarf in a Helium Hat"	Reza Badiyi	Stephen J. Cannell and David Chase	January 27, 1978
An inept mobster (Gianni Russo) misreads the phone book and confuses Jim Rockford with self-centered bon vivant Jay Rockfelt (John Pleshette), who the mobster has a serious grudge against. Reluctantly involved, Jim is compelled to rescue Jay’s poisoned dog, save Jay’s girlfriend (Rebecca Balding) when she is attacked by two men, be the getaway driver of a luxury coach when Jay flees a "Paris at Dawn" party, and spring Jay’s sister when she is kidnapped. With Rick Springfield, Milton Selzer and Ted Markland.
85	18	"South by Southeast"	William Wiard	Juanita Bartlett	February 3, 1978
The show’s sly crack at Alfred Hitchcock’s North by Northwest. Intelligence agents confuse Rockford with their contact person and fly Jim to a Latin American country. By the time they realize the mistake it is too late, and Rockford is begrudgingly enlisted to perform the mission. The operation involves contacting an heiress, Christine Van Deerlin (Dorrie Kavanaugh), and ultimately rescuing her from her scheming husband, who is carefully managing her public appearances while he poisons her. With Don Chastain, Carlos Romero, Bert Rosario, Mark Roberts, Don Diamond, Robert Clotworthy, Jim B. Smith, Don Dubbins and Ernesto Macias.
86	19	"The Competitive Edge"	Harry Falk	Gordon Dawson	February 10, 1978
Rockford is hired to find an alleged embezzler (Jim McMullan). The trail takes Jim to the Alphian Way, an exclusive health club for business professionals run by a megalomaniac doctor (Stephen Elliott) who drugs Rockford with a serum and ships him off to his brother’s psychiatric asylum, where if he is any trouble he will be permanently dealt with. The asylum has many genuine patients, who Rockford will need to involve when he tries to escape. With Logan Ramsey, Robert Hogan, George Murdock, John Fiedler, Pepper Martin, John Lupton, Harold Sakata, Dennis Fimple, William Boyett, Charles Howerton, Eugene Jackson, Angelo Rossitto, Anthony Charnota and Judith Woodbury.
87	20	"The Prisoner of Rosemont Hall"	Ivan Dixon	Story by : Chas. Floyd Johnson and Maryann Rea; Teleplay by : Stephen J. Cannell and David Chase	February 17, 1978
A journalism major in college is assumed to have died as a result of a tragic hazing accident. Investigating for a friend, Jim comes across a sinister head of campus security (Kenneth Tobey), mysterious foreign investigators, and a professor (Frances Lee McCain) who was in a long-term romantic relationship with the dead student. With Michael Swan, Ric Carrott, Buck Young, Maurice Sherbanee and Barney McFadden.
88	21	"The House on Willis Avenue"	Hy Averback	Stephen J. Cannell	February 24, 1978
89	22	"The House on Willis Avenue"	Hy Averback	Stephen J. Cannell	February 24, 1978
Rockford’s P.I. mentor Joe Tooley has died, and Jim does not believe the official story, that he was killed in a freeway accident. Also doubting it is young investigator Richie Brockelman (Dennis Dugan). They team up and look closely at a political activist, Albert Steever (Howard Hesseman), a corrupt councilman, Tom Nardoni (Philip Sterling), and several houses that contain nothing but very large air conditioning units. Everything revolves around a private investigation company run by the gadget-obsessed Garth McGregor (Jackie Cooper), who is out to corner the market on everyone’s private information and will kill to realize his business vision. Rockford and Brockelman survive a murder attempt against them and a felony warrant gets issued for their arrest. They go into hiding, then arrange for Jim to get caught by McGregor’s henchmen, hopeful that Richie will be able to follow them and learn a connection that might break open the case. With Pernell Roberts, Simon Oakland, Paul Fix, John Van Dreelen, Robert Hogan, Russell Thorson, Ben Wright, Irene Tedrow, Larry McCormick, Nick Dimitri, Hank Brandt, Vince Howard and Lou Krugman. The episode ends with a public service message that computer networks that gather vast amounts of information about people's private lives are a potential danger.
