= The Rockford Files season 5 =

The Rockford Files
- Season 5
- No. of episodes: 22

Release
- Original network: NBC
- Original release: September 22, 1978 – April 13, 1979

Season chronology
- ← Previous; Season 4 Next → Season 6

The fifth season of The Rockford Files originally aired Fridays at 9:00-10:00 pm on NBC from September 22, 1978 to April 13, 1979.

Stuart Margolin won an Emmy for Outstanding Supporting Actor in a Drama Series for season 5. Rita Moreno was nominated for an Emmy for Outstanding Lead Actress in a Drama Series for the episode "Rosendahl and Gilda Stern are Dead". Other notable guest stars in season 5 include Tom Selleck, Ed Harris, and Abe Vigoda.

== Episodes ==
No. overall	No. in season	Title	Directed by	Written by	Original release date
90	1	"Heartaches of a Fool"	William Wiard	Stephen J. Cannell	September 22, 1978
Rocky (Noah Beery Jr.) is forced off the road while delivering a shipment of sausages in a friend's rig. When the load turns out to be smuggled in from Mexico, Rocky stands to lose his union card as well as his driver's license. Rockford looks into it further, but having nothing else to go on connects with the country & western singer Charlie Strayhorn (Taylor Lacher) who stars in the TV commercials for the sausages. Strayhorn, who is frustrated from the divorce proceedings he's going through at home, teams up with Rockford to investigate. They come across a sham sausage factory, a dead body, and a Chinese organized crime triad that's about to go to war with an equally ruthless trucker's union. With James Shigeta, Lynne Marta, Norman Alden, Joe E. Tata, Leo Gordon, John Davey, Mark Roberts, Don "Red" Barry, Robert Phillips, Herb Armstrong and James Jeter.
91	2	"Rosendahl and Gilda Stern Are Dead"	William Wiard	Juanita Bartlett	September 29, 1978
Rita Capkovic (Rita Moreno), still working as a professional escort, is accused of the murder of a prominent surgeon. When the police refuse to follow up on any of her claims as to who actually did it, Rockford, sometimes with Rita in tow, steps in to investigate. It has them crossing paths with a medical devices salesman (Robin Gammell), the dead surgeon's partner (Robert Loggia) and his martini-swilling wife (Sharon Acker), and a vengeful mobster (Abe Vigoda) who is in great pain. With John Karlen, William Joyce, Jason Wingreen and Ron Gilbert.
92	3	"The Jersey Bounce"	William Wiard	Story by : Stephen J. Cannell, David Chase and Juanita Bartlett; Teleplay by : David Chase	October 6, 1978
Rockford is the prime suspect in the murder of a friend of Rocky's new neighbors, stupid punks from New Jersey who aspire to becoming successful criminals. As Beth Davenport no longer works for the law firm that represents Rockford, Jim is sent Wade Ward (Sorrell Booke) to be his defense attorney. However Ward is much more interested in an anti-trust case he's also working on. Jim instead gets help from John Cooper (Bo Hopkins), a disbarred lawyer now working as a legal researcher. With Greg Antonacci, Gene Davis, Luke Andreas and Walter Olkewicz.
93	4	"White on White and Nearly Perfect"	Stephen J. Cannell	Stephen J. Cannell	October 20, 1978
While two hoods do their best to make an aging ex-mobster (Peter Brocco) comfortable aboard an abandoned ship in the harbor, Rockford is called in to investigate the kidnapping of the daughter of the head of a weapon systems manufacturer. To Rockford's chagrin, also called in is Lance White (Tom Selleck), an investigator whose starry-eyed all-American manner Rockford has no time for, especially since Lance somehow always solves his cases, gets paid, and gets the girl. With Jason Evers, Bill Quinn, Eddie Fontaine, Karen Austin, Raynold Gideon, Frank Christi and Jay Rasumny.
94	5	"Kill the Messenger"	Ivan Dixon	Juanita Bartlett	October 27, 1978
Dennis Becker (Joe Santos), about to take his lieutenant's exam, is assigned a potentially career-ruining case. He has to investigate the murder of the wife of the deputy police chief (Byron Morrow), which will require him to ask embarrassing questions about their private lives. Becker's wife, Peggy (Pat Finley), gets Jim to help, but everything he discovers points to the deputy chief. With Ed Harris in his first notable role, also with W.K. Stratton, Nancy Parsons, Don Diamond, Frank McRae, Robert Cleaves and Alex Colon.
95	6	"A Good Clean Bust with Sequel Rights"	William Wiard	Rudolph Borchert	November 3, 1978
Rockford's retainer agreement requires him to watch over Frank Falcone (Hector Elizondo), a headstrong ex-policeman turned actor/writer around whom a line of new toys is about to be launched. However Falcone attracts controversy with everything he does, and when he assaults his policeman ex-partner things fall apart and Rockford loses the yearly income. There's more involved than mere commerce, at least two hitmen have a contract in town, and there is a connection to Falcone. With Nicolas Coster, James Sikking, Jerry Douglas, Louisa Moritz, James Murtaugh, Patricia Donahue, Hank Brandt and Jenny Sherman.
96	7	"A Three-Day Affair with a Thirty-Day Escrow"	Ivan Dixon	David Chase	November 10, 1978
Several Arabs abduct Rockford in the middle of the night and take him to their hotel room to find out where one of his recent clients is. Rockford escapes and tells the police, but Lieutenant Chapman (James Luisi) wants nothing to do with it. Rockford tries to track down the client, Sean Innis (Richard Romanus), thinking he might be in danger, but Innis gets wind of it and sends a thug to assault Rockford and find out what's up. It's about an expensive property sale and the Arab woman, Khedra Azziz (Maria Grimm), who Innis fell in love with. When Khedra's husband is killed, the gigolo Innis looks good for the murder and Khedra is targeted by the headmen in her family for an “honor killing”. The two of them, plus Rockford and the head of a real estate company, find themselves on a plane about to fly to the Middle East, a trip they are unlikely to return from. Episode includes Richard Moll in one of his earliest roles. Also with Robert Alda, Joshua Bryant, Janis Paige, Andrew Masset, Gilbert Green, Maurice Sherbanee, James W. Gavin and George Fisher.
97	8	"The Empty Frame"	Corey Allen	Stephen J. Cannell	November 17, 1978
A swanky party of the city's elites is interrupted by three revolution-spouting, well armed radicals who strip the male guests of their pants before making off with some choice paintings. The host, fearful that the embarrassed police are anxious to bury the case (as many of the force's top officers, including Lieutenant Chapman, were providing security at the party), hires Rockford to investigate. Jim had also attended, thanks to an invitation by Angel, who has become very well connected. While Chapman bends over backwards to get Rockford's help in the investigation, the robbers have their own problems: their escape plan didn’t pan out, they cannot get a good price for the stolen art, one of them has to stay in town because he is on parole, and only their leader still believes in their political cause. With Richard Seff, Jonathan Goldsmith, Eddie Ryder, Paul Carr, Lee Delano, Milt Kogan, Dale Robinette and Dennis Robertson.
98	9	"Black Mirror"	Arnold Laven	David Chase	November 24, 1978
99	10	"Black Mirror"	Arnold Laven	David Chase	November 24, 1978
Rockford grows attached to blind psychologist Megan Dougherty (Kathryn Harrold), who is being subjected to increasingly worrisome harassment and personal attacks. She does not believe the culprit could be any of her patients, so refuses to compromise their confidentiality. Rockford's attention falls on the meek Danny Green (John Pleshette), but Megan insists Green's personality isn’t that of a stalker. However Green goes by another identity, the hostile Jackie Tetuska, who police suspect is a contract killer. Megan and another expert think Green/Tetuska is a split personality, but Rockford suspects Tetuska is brilliantly calculating and his Green persona is part of a fallback plan should he ever get caught. With Carl Franklin, Allan Arbus, Leo Gordon, Denny Miller, John Howard, Peter Tomarken and Alan Manson.
100	11	"A Fast Count"	Reza Badiyi	Gordon Dawson	December 1, 1978
Used car mogul and TV personality Ruth Beetson-White (Mary Frann) is the power broker in the local boxing scene. Rockford owns a 5% share in promising young fighter Jesus Hernandez (Steven Bauer), but since Jesus is shut out of the televised matches the investment is worthless. When Rockford complains to Hernandez's trainer-manager, Morry Hawthorne (Kenneth McMillan), he learns that Morry is up to his neck in fraud and bribery allegations. Rockford comes to believe the troubles are all part of a Beetson-White plot to gain control of Hernandez. With Bert Kramer, Carl Anderson, Don Starr, Len Wayland, Lawrence P. Casey, Rosa Turich, Woody Eney and John Kerry.
101	12	"Local Man Eaten by Newspaper"	Meta Rosenberg	Juanita Bartlett	December 8, 1978
A doctor to the stars hires Rockford to investigate how a National Enquirer-like publication got its hands on the private medical information of some of his clients. Rockford takes a job under a fake name as a reporter for the tabloid, but his cover gets blown. Shortly afterwards the doctor is killed when his office is broken into while with Rockford; the paper prints all the negative information it has about Rockford afterwards. The paper had previously run a story that a leading local mobster (Gianni Russo) is suffering from a serious cancer, which has set off family intrigues to eliminate him. In that way Rockford's and the mobster's problems become connected. With Scott Brady, Bo Hopkins, Kenneth Tigar, Rose Gregorio, Scott Marlowe, Harlee McBride, Pat Renella, Joe E. Tata and Dallas Mitchell.
102	13	"With the French Heel Back, Can the Nehru Jacket Be Far Behind?"	Ivan Dixon	Rudolph Borchert	January 5, 1979
Carol, a fashion model ex-girlfriend of Rockford, telephones him panic-stricken one night, but by the time he gets to her hotel room she is dead in what the police decide was a suicide. Rockford strongly disagrees, but Dennis Becker cannot look into the case because he is tied up in the same-night murder of another model. Leaving the police station, Rockford hears a woman (Erin Gray) angrily disputing that Carol killed herself, and the two become friends. Rockford is hired by a pompous fashion designer (Rene Auberjonois) to investigate his theory, that Carol was being pressured by a rival design house to reveal the secrets of his latest clothing line. It gets Rockford looking into the haute couture ‘rag business’, complete with loan sharks, mobsters and oversized egos. With Michael Des Barres, Marisa Pavan, Howard Witt, Marguerite Ray, John Zenda, Jim B. Smith, Albert Carrier, Chris DeRose and W.K. Stratton.
103	14	"The Battle-Ax and the Exploding Cigar"	Ivan Dixon	Story by : Mann Rubin and Michael Wagner; Teleplay by : Rogers Turrentine	January 12, 1979
Rockford is left facing the rap when, returning from a losing gambling trip in Las Vegas that was so bad a casino is holding onto his car, he accepts a ride from a windbag, Bernard Petrankus (Sully Boyar), and is behind the wheel of his Cadillac when it is pulled over by police and its trunk is found full of illegal weapons. When Rockford tries to clear himself he learns there is no record of his arrest statement and the stenographer who took it is missing. Jim teams up with Mrs. Bateman (Marge Redmond), the head of the office steno pool, to search for her. They find themselves involved with the FBI, the ATF, and a CIA-like agency that is bent on selling weapons to overseas guerillas. With Lane Smith, Charles Weldon, Roscoe Born, Glenn Corbett, Mitzi Hoag and Lawrence P. Casey.
104	15	"Guilt"	William Wiard	Juanita Bartlett	January 19, 1979
Valerie Pointer (Pat Crowley), an old girlfriend of Rockford, is being terrorized and Jim feels obligated to help. Rockford turns up several men within Valerie’s circle who have reason to dislike her, but also learns she has a manner that invites domestic drama. With Elisabeth Brooks, Ted Shackelford, Rita Gam, Eldon Quick, Robert Quarry and James Carroll.
105	16	"The Deuce"	Bernard McEveety	Gordon Dawson	January 26, 1979
A woman’s death is made to look like an accident caused by drunk driver George Bassett (Mills Watson). Rockford is on the jury hearing the case, and despite intense peer pressure votes not guilty, so a second trial is scheduled. Bassett and his wife hire Jim to clear his name, which draws the ire of the prosecutor. Rockford discovers how the death was staged, and soon both he and Bassett get targeted for murder. With Margaret Blye, Richard Kelton, Sharon Spelman, James Karen, Joe Maross, Ed McCready, Ray Stewart and Robert Sampson.
106	17	"The Man Who Saw the Alligators"	Corey Allen	David Chase	February 10, 1979
Twisted hitman Anthony Gagglio (George Loros) has been released from prison, and he is obsessed with killing Rockford. He and his partner Syl (Luke Andreas) catch up with Jim, Jim's tax advisor (Sharon Acker) and Angel (Stuart Margolin) at a remote cabin. As Gagglio and Rockford argue two mobsters show up gunning for Gagglio. When they shoot Syl it forces Jim and Gagglio to work together to get rid of the hoods, and only then will they be able to tangle with each other. With Joseph V. Perry, Julie Parrish, Michael J. London, Raymond O'Keefe, Noel Conlon, Howard Honig, Joseph Sirola, Pennys Santon and Joey Aresco.
107	18	"The Return of the Black Shadow"	William Wiard	Stephen J. Cannell	February 17, 1979
Rockford's friend John Cooper (Bo Hopkins) goes after the motorcycle gang that brutally assaulted his sister when she and Jim were on a road trip. While Cooper plots his revenge, the gang's leader (Paul Koslo) has his own plans to run riot over a picnic hosted by his ex-buddies from the gang's old days, who have become respectable businessmen and have forcibly told him to shut it down. With Dennis Burkley, Noah Keen, Sandra de Bruin, Joseph Burke, Andy Jarrell, Ken A. Anderson and Jerry Ayres.
108	19	"A Material Difference"	William Wiard	Rogers Turrentine	February 24, 1979
Angel (Stuart Margolin) figures he has come up with a great con, he will pretend to be a hitman and then disappear after receiving the front money. When the first contract goes bad the people Angel cheated try to find him through Rockford, and then when someone does get killed the two of them are implicated in the murder. To clear himself Jim, dragging Angel along, has to deal with Russian spies who are very interested in blue jeans, and an unusually equipped dentist's office. Meanwhile agents from the Office of Naval Intelligence investigate the murder, but refuse to share information with Dennis Becker (Joe Santos). With Joshua Bryant, David Tress, Rod Browning, Michael Alldredge and Michael McGuire.
109	20	"Never Send a Boy King to Do a Man's Job"	William Wiard	Juanita Bartlett	March 3, 1979
110	21	"Never Send a Boy King to Do a Man's Job"	William Wiard	Juanita Bartlett	March 3, 1979
The show's nod to The Sting. The father (Harold Gould) of youthful P.I. Richie Brockelman (Dennis Dugan) is assaulted to get him to sign over his company to crooked businessman Harold Jack Coombs (Robert Webber) for a fraction of its actual worth. Richie gets Rockford's help in orchestrating an elaborate con that will get his father the true value of his lost assets. But the con has many moving parts, starting with Rockford adopting his Jimmy-Joe Meeker persona and winning Coombs’ fancy race car in a one-on-one duel at the track. There's also an auction of ancient artifacts to be staged, a King Tut exhibition to plan, and the fake strangulation deaths of several people to arrange. All this will require many good conmen, and one outstanding con woman (played by Trisha Noble), to pull off. With Pepper Martin, Kim Hunter, Gary Crosby, Jack Collins, Jennifer Holmes, Shirley Anthony, Robert Hitchcock, Joe Pine, George Simmons, Todd Martin, Stanley Brock and David Hooks.
111	22	"A Different Drummer"	Reza Badiyi	Rudolph Borchert	April 13, 1979
Inspired by Coma. Recovering from an accident in the hospital, Rockford sees a cadaver's arm moving just as an organ is being removed from elsewhere in the body. When Rockford questions it his doubts are almost assuaged by the operating surgeon, the charming Dr. Lee Yost (John Considine). Still, Rockford wonders why Yost's organ clinic is a for-profit operation, and investigates further. Rockford's car develops a problem, which may have been an attempt to kill him. Then Jim talks to Yost’s adopted parents, which gets Jim doubting him more. How much of a psychopath is Yost? Jesse Welles portrays Yost's gullible secretary, and Reni Santoni portrays an asylum inmate who was first to question Yost's true nature. With Carmen Argenziano, Walter Brooke, David S. Cass Sr., Harlan Warde, Fritzi Burr and Ray Stricklyn.
