= William Daniels =

American actor (born 1927)

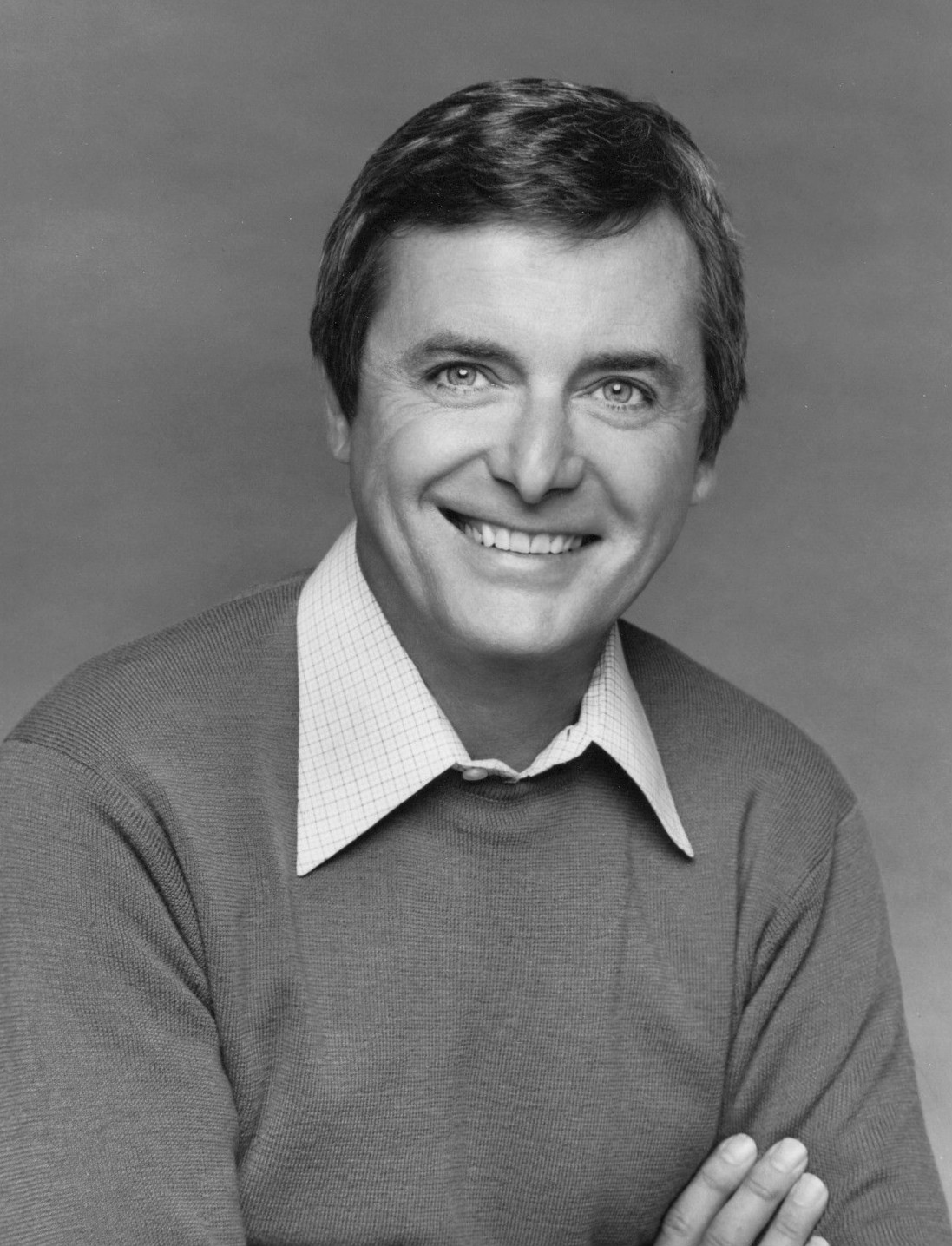
- Daniels in 1976
- Born: William David Daniels; March 31, 1927 (age 99); New York City, U.S.
- Education: Northwestern University
- Occupation: Actor
- Years active: 1943–present
- Spouse: Bonnie Bartlett (m. 1951)
- Children: 3

President of the Screen Actors Guild
- In office March 5, 1999 – October 15, 2001
- Preceded by: Richard Masur
- Succeeded by: Melissa Gilbert
- Military career
- Branch: United States Army
- Service years: 1945
- Website: williamdanielstheactor.com

William David Daniels (born March 31, 1927) is an American actor, known for his television roles, notably as Mark Craig on the drama series St. Elsewhere, for which he won two Primetime Emmy Awards; the voice of KITT on the television series Knight Rider; and George Feeny on the sitcom Boy Meets World, which earned him four People's Choice Award nominations. He reprised his Knight Rider role in the sequel TV movie Knight Rider 2000 and his Boy Meets World role in the sequel series Girl Meets World. He also portrayed Carter Nash (the actual identity of the eponymous comedic superhero) in Captain Nice.

Daniels's film roles include Mr. Braddock (Benjamin Braddock's father) in The Graduate, Howard Maxwell-Manchester in Two for the Road, and John Adams in the musical film 1776. He was president of the Screen Actors Guild from 1999 to 2001 and led the union's efforts during the 2000 commercial actors strike.

Daniels is also noted for having portrayed in film or on television the three most prominent members of the Adams political family: John Adams, his cousin and fellow founding father, Samuel Adams, and John Adams's son John Quincy Adams.

== Early life ==
William David Daniels was born on March 31, 1927, in Brooklyn, New York, to Irene and David Daniels. His father was a bricklayer, and his mother was a telephone operator. He has two sisters, Jacqueline and Carol. He grew up in East New York, Brooklyn.

Daniels was drafted into the U.S. Army in 1945 and stationed in Italy, where he served as a disc jockey at an Army radio station. At the suggestion of Howard Lindsay, co-author of Life with Father, who recommended he use the GI Bill to attend a college with a good drama department, Daniels enrolled at Northwestern University. He graduated from Northwestern in 1949, and is a member of Sigma Nu fraternity.

== Career ==
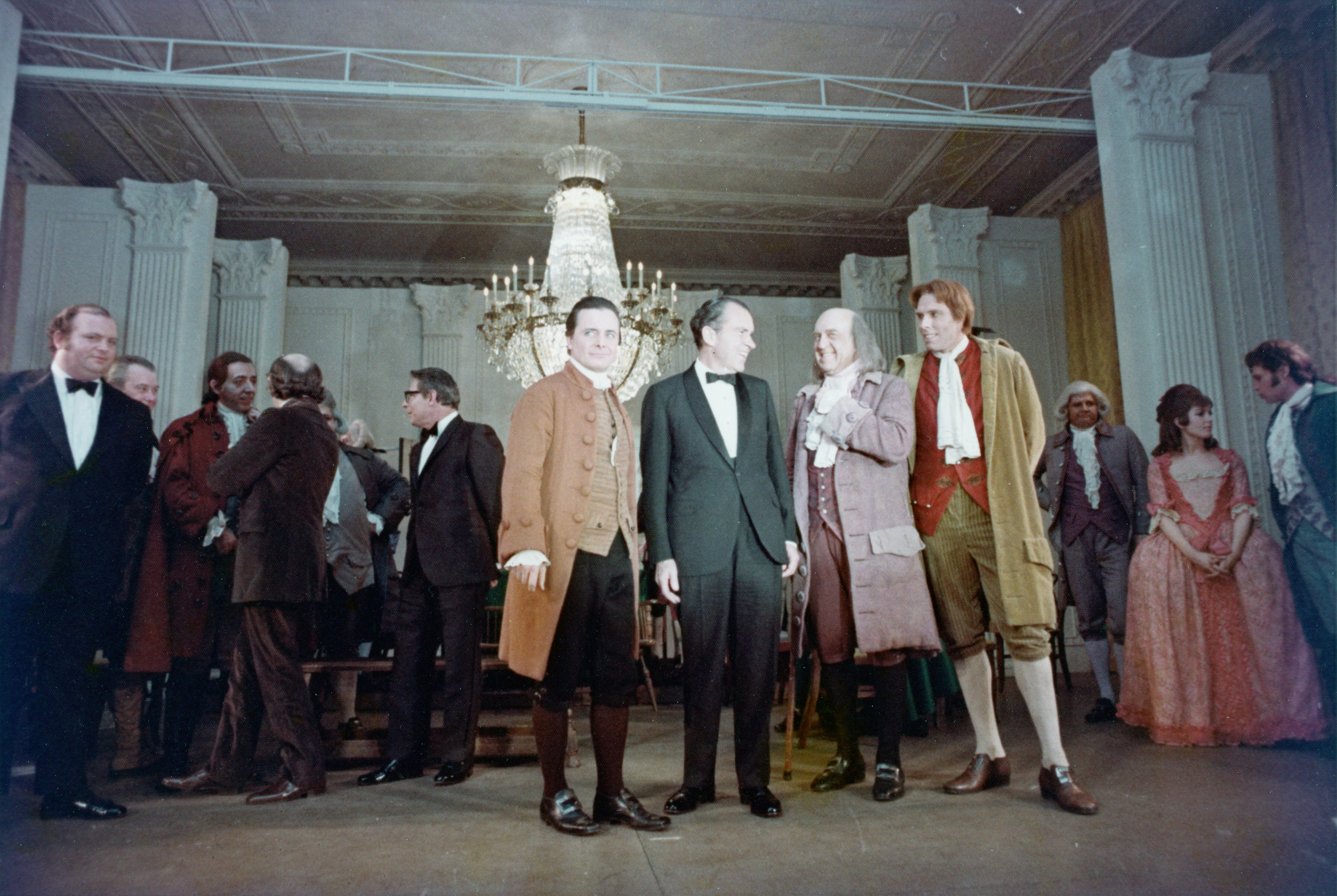
Daniels and other cast members of 1776 with Richard Nixon following a performance of the Tony Award-winning musical in the East Room of the White House (1971)

Daniels began his career as a member of the singing Daniels family in Brooklyn. He made his television debut as part of a variety act (along with other members of his family) in 1943, on NBC, then a single station in New York. He made his Broadway debut in 1943 in Life with Father, and remained a busy Broadway actor for decades afterwards. His Broadway credits include roles in 1776, A Thousand Clowns, On a Clear Day You Can See Forever, and A Little Night Music. He received an Obie Award for The Zoo Story (1960).

Daniels's motion picture debut was as a school principal in the 1963 anti-war drama film Ladybug Ladybug. In 1965, he reprised his Broadway role as a child welfare worker in the screen version of A Thousand Clowns. In 1967 he appeared in The Graduate as the father of Dustin Hoffman's character. In 1969, Daniels starred as John Adams in the Broadway musical 1776; he also appeared in the film version in 1972. Two years later, he co-starred in Richard Donner's telefilm Sarah T. - Portrait of a Teenage Alcoholic. In 1978 and 1979 he again reprised his role as the outspoken John Adams in the films The Bastard and The Rebels, again about the American Revolution, without seeming to ever break character.

Daniels's first network television appearance came in 1952 when he portrayed the young John Quincy Adams, eldest son of John and Abigail Adams in the Hallmark Hall of Fame drama A Woman for the Ages. In 1976, he reprised the role as the middle-aged and elder John Quincy Adams in the acclaimed PBS miniseries The Adams Chronicles. He starred in the short-lived series Captain Nice as police chemist Carter Nash. He appeared as acid-tongued Dr. Mark Craig in St. Elsewhere from 1982 to 1988, for which he won two Emmy awards. Concurrently, he provided the voice of KITT in Knight Rider from 1982 to 1986. Daniels said in 1982, "My duties on Knight Rider are very simple. I do it in about an hour and a half. I've never met the cast. I haven't even met the producer."

Daniels reprised the voice-only role of KITT in 1991 for the television movie Knight Rider 2000, and again in the theatrical comedy movie The Benchwarmers. He performed the role in AT&T and GE commercials about talking machines, and twice in The Simpsons as well as at the Comedy Central Roast of his co-star David Hasselhoff. He reprised the role of KITT in the 2015 Lego-themed action-adventure video game Lego Dimensions.

Daniels portrayed strict but loving educator George Feeny at John Adams High School in Boy Meets World from 1993 to 2000. In addition to the previously mentioned 1967 superhero sitcom Captain Nice, he was a regular on the 1970s TV series Freebie and the Bean and The Nancy Walker Show.

A familiar character actor, he has appeared as a guest star on numerous TV comedies and dramas, including Soap, The Rockford Files, Quincy, M.E., Kolchak: The Night Stalker, and many others. In 2012, Daniels appeared in the ninth season of Grey's Anatomy as Dr. Craig Thomas, an unlikely mentor to the character of Dr. Cristina Yang played by actress Sandra Oh. His character, Dr. Thomas, died in the operating room while performing a procedure to repair a heart defect midway through the season, which forced Yang to move back to Seattle.

In 2014, Daniels reprised his role as Mr. Feeny in the pilot episode of the Boy Meets World spinoff, Girl Meets World. He cameoed in the final scene, praising the adult Cory Matthews for his parenting. He made additional appearances in the second and third seasons.

In early 2023, he completed filming of the role of King Henry VI in the upcoming Richard III.

On October 14, 2025, at 98 years old, he appeared as a surprise guest on Dancing with the Stars.

== Personal life ==
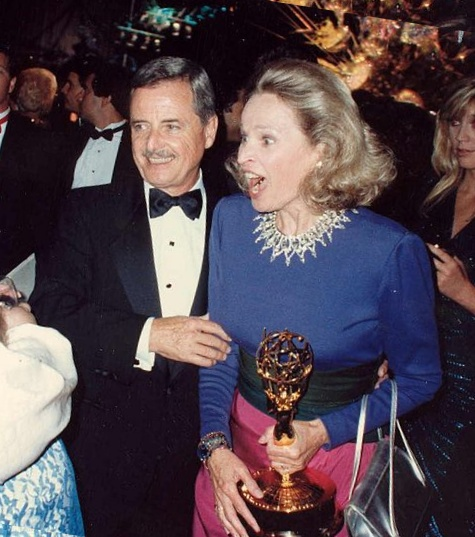
Daniels with wife Bonnie Bartlett at the 1987 Emmy Awards

Daniels has been married to actress and fellow Emmy Award winner Bonnie Bartlett since June 30, 1951; at 75 years, it is the longest active Hollywood marriage as of June 2026. In 1961, Bartlett gave birth to a son, who died 24 hours later. They adopted two sons. They also have four grandchildren, two through their son Michael, and another two through their other son Robert.

Bartlett and Daniels both served on the Screen Actors Guild's board of directors.

== Awards and honors ==
Daniels refused the 1969 Tony Award nomination for Featured Actor in a Musical in 1776 due to his insistence that the part of John Adams was a leading role rather than supporting. He was ruled to be ineligible for the Best Actor nomination because of the technicality that his name was not billed above the title of the show.

From 1983 to 1987, Daniels' work on St. Elsewhere earned him five consecutive nominations for the Primetime Emmy Award for Outstanding Lead Actor in a Drama Series, winning in 1985 and 1986. In 1986, Daniels and Bartlett, who played his fictional wife on St. Elsewhere, won Emmy Awards on the same night (Bartlett for Supporting Actress in a Drama Series), becoming the first married couple to accomplish the feat since Alfred Lunt and Lynn Fontanne in 1965 for a production of The Magnificent Yankee for the Hallmark Hall of Fame.

== Filmography ==
=== Film ===
Year	Title	Role	Notes
1963	Ladybug Ladybug	Mr. Calkins	
1965	A Thousand Clowns	Albert Amundson	
1967	Two for the Road	Howard Manchester	
1967	The Graduate	Mr. Braddock	
1967	The President's Analyst	Wynn Quantrill	
1969	Marlowe	Mr. Crowell	
1972	1776	John Adams	
1974	The Parallax View	Austin Tucker	
1977	Black Sunday	Harold Pugh	
1977	Oh, God!	George Summers	
1978	The One and Only	Mr. Crawford	
1979	Sunburn	Crawford	
1979	The Rebels	John Adams	
1980	The Blue Lagoon	Arthur Lestrange	
1981	All Night Long	Richard H. Copleston	
1981	Reds	Julius Gerber	
1987	Blind Date	Judge Harold Bedford	
1989	Her Alibi	Sam	
1994	Magic Kid 2	Manny	
2006	The Benchwarmers	KITT	Voice, uncredited
2007	Blades of Glory	Commissioner Ebbers	
2020	Superintelligence	KITT	Voice

=== Television ===
Year	Title	Role	Notes
1952	A Woman for the Ages	John Quincy Adams	TV movie
1956	Robert Montgomery Presents	Donald Kemper	Episode: "Three Men From Tomorrow"
1956, 1960, 1961	Armstrong Circle Theatre	Leonard Gregory	Episode: "Five Who Shook the Mighty"; Episode: "Separate Parents"; Episode: "The Spy Next Door"
1959	Brenner	Larry Dyer	Episode: "Man in the Middle"
1961, 1962	Naked City	Herbert Grafton; Harry Culverin	Episode: "A Kettle of Precious Fish"; Episode: "Idyllis of a Running Back"
1962, 1964	The Defenders	Malloy; Mike Herman	Episode: "The Locked Room"; Episode: "A Voice Loud and Clear"
1963	East Side/West Side	Principal Costigan	Episode: "I Before E Except After C"
1963, 1965	The Doctors and the Nurses	Vernon Kane; Buddy	Episode: "Field of Battle"; Episode: "A Couple of Dozen Tiny Pills"
1965	For the People	Fred Rice	Episode: "Any Benevolent Purpose"
1966	T.H.E. Cat	Tony Webb	Episode: "The Ring of Anasis"
1967	Captain Nice	Carter Nash / Captain Nice	Main cast; 15 episodes
1968	The Good Guys	Arnold Schreck	Episode: "Let 'em Eat Rolls"
1968	The Ghost & Mrs. Muir	Blair Thompson	Episode: "Mr. Perfect"
1969	Judd, for the Defense	Harry Stratton	Episode: "Epitaph on a Computer Card"
1972	Cannon	Dale Corey	Episode: "Hear No Evil"
1973	Love, American Style	Alan	Segment: "Love and the Old Lover"
1973	Ironside	Stillwald, the Bank Manager	Episode: "All Honorable Men"
1973	Murdock's Gang	Roger Bates	TV movie
1973	The Fabulous Doctor Fable	Elliot Borden	TV movie
1973, 1976	McCloud	Clayton Gills; Fred Pearson	Episode: "Butch Cassidy Rides Again"; Episode: "The Day New York Turned Blue"
1974	Kolchak: The Night Stalker	Police Lt. Jack Matteo	Episode: "The Vampire"
1974	A Case of Rape	Leonard Alexander	TV movie
1975	Insight	Mike Madden	Episode: "Hunger Knows My Name"
1975	Barbary Coast	Boyle	Episode: "Irish Luck"
1975	The Bob Newhart Show	Edgar T. Vickers Jr.	Episode: "Fathers and Sons and Mothers"
1975	Sarah T. – Portrait of a Teenage Alcoholic	Matt Hodges	TV movie
1975	One of Our Own	Dr. Moresby	TV movie
1976	Francis Gary Powers: The True Story of the U-2 Spy Incident	Bissell	TV movie
1976	That Was the Year That Was – 1976	Sketch Actor	TV movie
1976	The Adams Chronicles	John Quincy Adams (age 50–81)	
1976	McMillan & Wife	Commander Campbell	Episode: "Point of Law"
1976	The Rockford Files	Thomas Caine; Gary Bevins	Episode: "The Italian Bird Fiasco"; Episode: "So Help Me God"
1976–1977	The Nancy Walker Show	Lt. Commander Kenneth Kitteridge	Main cast; 13 episodes
1976, 1979, 1980	Quincy, M.E.	Paul Reardon; Charlie Trusdale; Dr. Charlie Volmer	Episode: "A Star is Dead"; Episode: "Dark Angel"; Episode: "Last Rights"
1977	The Incredible Hulk	Dr. John Bonifant	Episode: "Death in the Family"
1977	Killer on Board	Marshall Snowden	TV movie
1977	The Court-Martial of George Armstrong Custer	Colonel Marcus Reno	TV movie
1978	Soap	Heinrich Himmel	Season 1, Episode 16
1978	Family	Dr. Taylor	Episode: "Counterpoint"
1978	Grandpa Goes to Washington	Gov. Bronx	Episode: "Pilot"
1978	Greatest Heroes of the Bible	Chasrubal	Episode: "Joshua and the Battle of Jericho"
1978	The Bastard	Samuel Adams	TV movie
1978	Big Bob Johnson and His Fantastic Speed Circus	Lawrence Stepwell III	TV movie
1978	Sergeant Matlovich vs. the U.S. Air Force	Father Veller	TV movie
1979	Blind Ambition	G. Gordon Liddy	
1979	The Chinese Typewriter	Devlin	TV movie
1979	The Rebels	John Adams	TV movie
1980	The Misadventures of Sheriff Lobo	Dr. Walter Taylor	Episode: "Who's the Sexiest Girl in the World"
1980	Galactica 1980	Norman Blore	Episodes: "The Night the Cylons Landed Part 1" & "Part 2"
1980	City in Fear	Freeman Stirbling	TV movie
1980	Father Damien: The Leper Priest	Bishop Koeckemann	TV movie
1980–1981	Freebie and the Bean	District Attorney Walter W. Cruikshank	Recurring role; 4 episodes
1981	Trapper John, M.D.	Dr. Slater	Episode: "Second Sight"
1981	Private Benjamin	Teddy	Episode: "Bye, Bye Benjamin"
1981	The Million Dollar Face	Henry Burns	TV movie
1982	Hart to Hart	Simon Richardson	Episode: "Hartless Hobby"
1982	Rehearsal for Murder	Walter Lamb	TV movie
1982	Rooster	Dr. DeVega	TV movie
1982	Drop-Out Father	Draper Wright	TV movie
1982–1986	Knight Rider	KITT	Voice role; 84 episodes
1982–1988	St. Elsewhere	Dr. Mark Craig	Main cast; 137 episodes
1986	Faerie Tale Theatre	Narrator	Episode: "The Princess Who Had Never Laughed"
1987	The Little Match Girl	Haywood Dutton	TV movie
1989	Howard Beach: Making a Case for Murder	Slaney	TV movie
1990	On Thin Ice: The Tai Babilonia Story	John Nicks	TV movie
1991	General Motors Playwright Theater	Detective Lieutenant Fine	Episode: "Clara"
1991	Knight Rider 2000	KITT	TV movie; voice
1992	Back to the Streets of San Francisco	Judge Julius Burns	TV movie
1993	Nurses	Norm Kaplan	Episode: "Family Outing"
1993–2000	Boy Meets World	George Feeny	Main cast; 148 episodes
1994	The American Revolution	John Adams	Documentary; Voice
1996	The Lottery	Reverend Hutchinson	TV movie
1996, 2003	Touched by an Angel	Whit Russell; George	Episode: "Birthmarks"; Episode: "And a Nightingale Song"
1998, 2004	The Simpsons	KITT	Voice; Episode: "The Wizard of Evergreen Terrace"; Episode: "Milhouse Doesn't Live Here Anymore"
2000	Star Trek: Voyager	Hospital Ship 4–2, Allocation Alpha	Voice; Episode: "Critical Care"
2002	Scrubs	Dr. Douglas	Episode: "My Sacrificial Clam"
2003	Lost at Home	Arthur	Episode: "Our Town"
2003	The Lyon's Den	Judge Franklin Campbell	Episode: "Blood"
2004	The King of Queens	Philip Waldecott	Episode: "Icky Shuffle"
2004	Kim Possible	Robot Pilot	Voice; Episode: "Ron Millionaire"
2005	The Grim Adventures of Billy & Mandy	Scythe 2.0	Voice; Episode: "Runaway Pants/Scythe 2.0"
2006	The Closer	Commissioner Andrew Schmidt	Episodes: "Serving the King Part 1 & 2"
2008	Boston Legal	Judge Milton Brody	Episode: "Smoke Signals"
2012	Paulilu Mixtape	Dr. Vanderhoof	Episode: "Ghost Tits"
2012	Grey's Anatomy	Dr. Craig Thomas	6 episodes
2014–2017	Girl Meets World	George Feeny	Recurring role; 5 episodes
2025	Dancing With The Stars - Season 34	Himself (Danielle Fishel Special Guest)	Episode 5: Dedication Night

=== Video games ===
Year	Title	Role	Notes
2015	Lego Dimensions	K.I.T.T	Voice

== Theatre ==
=== Broadway ===
Year	Title	Role	Venue	Notes
1945	Life With Father	Clarence	Bijou Theatre	Replacement
1952	Seagulls Over Sorrento	Sub-Lt. Granger, R.N.	John Golden Theatre	Credited as Bill Daniels
1959	The Legend of Lizzie	Assistant D. A. Cooper	54th Street Theatre	
1962	A Thousand Clowns	Albert Amundson	Eugene O'Neill Theatre	
1963	Dear Me, The Sky is Falling	Dr. Robert Evans	Music Box Theatre	
1963	One Flew Over the Cuckoo's Nest	Dale Harding	Cort Theatre	
1965	On a Clear Day You Can See Forever	Warren Smith	Mark Hellinger Theatre	
1966	The Office	performer	Henry Miller's Theatre	Closed during previews
1967	Daphne in Cottage D	Joseph	Longacre Theatre	
1969	1776	John Adams	46th Street Theater	
1974	A Little Night Music	Fredrik Egerman	Shubert Theatre	Replacement

=== Additional credits ===
Year	Title	Role	Venue	Notes	Ref.
1960	The Zoo Story	Peter	Provincetown Playhouse, Off-Broadway		
1960	The Alligators	Bolo	York Playhouse, Off-Broadway		
1972	1776	John Adams	Starlight Musicals, Indianapolis		
1972	1776	John Adams	The Muny, St. Louis		

== Books ==
- Daniels, William (2017). There I Go Again: How I Came to Be Mr. Feeny, John Adams, Dr. Craig, KITT, and Many Others. Potomac Books, Inc.
