= The Rockford Files season 1 =

The Rockford Files
- Season 1
- No. of episodes: 23

Release
- Original network: NBC
- Original release: September 13, 1974 – March 7, 1975

Season chronology
- Next → Season 2

The first season of The Rockford Files television series originally aired on NBC during the 1974–1975 season. James Garner was 46 at the time of airing.

Special guests in season 1 included James Cromwell, Abe Vigoda, Jill Clayburgh, Joseph Cotten and Linda Evans.

== Episodes ==
No. overall	No. in season	Title	Directed by	Written by	Original release date
1	1	"The Kirkoff Case"	Lou Antonio	Story by : John Thomas James; Teleplay by : Stephen J. Cannell	September 13, 1974
Rockford, hired by a wealthy young heir (James Woods) to investigate the murder of his parents, tails the late father’s young gold digger mistress (Julie Sommars), visits a mob-run union headquarters, and discovers that the police are anxious to pin the killings on the heir. With guest Abe Vigoda as the head mobster and Milt Kogan as his assistant, also with Roger Davis, Fred Lerner, Philip Kenneally, Sandra de Bruin and Dennis McCarthy.
2	2	"The Dark and Bloody Ground"	Michael Schultz	Story by : John Thomas James; Teleplay by : Juanita Bartlett	September 20, 1974
Rockford is hired by his attorney, Beth (Gretchen Corbett), to investigate a murder for which another of her clients has been charged. The killers try to scare him off the case, and when he connects the murder to the lucrative film rights to a bestselling novel, they try to kill him. With Linden Chiles, Nancy Malone, Patricia Smith and Walter Brooke.
3	3	"The Countess"	Russ Mayberry	Story by : John Thomas James; Teleplay by : Stephen J. Cannell	September 27, 1974
Rockford is hired by a socialite (Susan Strasberg) to deal with a blackmailer (Dick Gautier). When the extortionist is shot Rockford not only becomes the prime suspect in his murder, but he also gets on the hit list of mobsters the blackmailer associated with. With Harold J. Stone as a hood, Art Lund as the husband of the countess, also with Florence Lake, Todd Martin and James Cromwell.
4	4	"Exit Prentiss Carr"	Alex Grasshoff	Story by : John Thomas James; Teleplay by : Juanita Bartlett	October 4, 1974
Rockford discovers his client’s murdered husband in a hotel room, but when he reports it to the police they quickly rule it a suicide. To complicate things further the client (Corinne Camacho) is an old flame of Rockford, her alibi does not check out, and she wants to rekindle their relationship. With Mills Watson as a skeptical detective, Warren J. Kemmerling, Stephen McNally, William Jordan, Wallace Rooney, Roberta Collins and Hank Rolike.
5	5	"Tall Woman in Red Wagon"	Jerry London	Story by : John Thomas James; Teleplay by : Stephen J. Cannell	October 11, 1974
Rockford is hired to find a missing colleague by a pushy newspaper reporter (Sian Barbara Allen) who promises he will grow to like her. Rockford learns the missing woman has died but does not believe it. He interviews the doctor who signed her death certificate and mobsters who say she stole money from them, assaults an IRS agent (George DiCenzo) who is also on the case, and gets shot while digging up her coffin in the middle of the night. With John Crawford, Susan Damante, Angus Duncan and James Murtaugh. Loosely based on The Twelve Chairs.
6	6	"This Case Is Closed"	Bernard L. Kowalski	Story by : John Thomas James; Teleplay by : Stephen J. Cannell	October 18, 1974
7	7	"This Case Is Closed"	Bernard L. Kowalski	Story by : John Thomas James; Teleplay by : Stephen J. Cannell	October 18, 1974
Rockford’s client (Joseph Cotten) wants him to investigate the man his daughter (Sharon Gless) is about to marry. A trip to New Jersey gets Rockford in trouble with the police there, and on his return to Los Angeles he is abducted by local mobsters. Federal officials pressure him into testifying against the thugs, but when the prospective son-in-law is murdered, Rockford has to re-assess his priorities. Featuring James McEachin as an FBI agent and Eddie Fontaine as a Jersey police lieutenant, also with Fred Sadoff, Norman Bartold, Stuart Nisbet, Robert Karnes and Fred Lerner. Originally shown as a 90-minute episode; later re-edited (with much repeated and redundant footage) into two one-hour episodes.
8	8	"The Big Ripoff"	Vincent McEveety	Story by : John Thomas James; Teleplay by : Robert Hamner	October 25, 1974
A dead man’s mistress (Nedra Deen) has hired Rockford to prove that his wife murdered him by arranging for his private plane to crash. When Rockford reports that he does not believe the man is dead, the mistress does not accept his conclusion and does not pay him. Rockford thinks the husband may have contacted the mistress in the interim, and negotiates with the insurance company that paid out on the plane crash for a finder’s fee if he can prove the husband and wife staged it. He trails the ex-mistress to a small town. However she has friends who try to force Rockford to give up the search, and the missing husband is nowhere to be found. The episode features Jill Clayburgh in a supporting role, also with Norman Burton, Fred Beir, Bruce Kirby, Warren Vanders, Kelly Thordsen, Basil Hoffman, and Suzanne Somers in a non-speaking part.
9	9	"Find Me If You Can"	Lawrence Doheny	Story by : John Thomas James; Teleplay by : Juanita Bartlett	November 1, 1974
A mysterious woman pays Rockford in advance to find someone – herself. She’s the ex-girlfriend (Joan Van Ark) of a mobster (Paul Michael Glaser) and she wants to be sure he cannot track her down. However Rockford’s investigation only has the effect of alerting the hood that she may be planning to use the damaging information she knows about him, which puts both her and Rockford on his hit list. With Joseph Stern, Jimmy Lydon and Adrian Ricard.
10	10	"In Pursuit of Carol Thorne"	Charles S. Dubin	Story by : John Thomas James; Teleplay by : Stephen J. Cannell	November 8, 1974
An elderly couple (Robert Symonds and Irene Tedrow) hires Rockford to find their son, Cliff. To get a line on him Rockford starts dating a recent prison parolee (Lynette Mettey), Cliff’s ex-girlfriend. But locating Cliff (Jim Antonio) is just the start of the adventure, involving an interested policeman, hidden stolen money, and Rockford having to learn the hard way that the ex-girlfriend may be the most honest person among them. With Bill Fletcher, Sandy Ward and Vince Howard.
11	11	"The Dexter Crisis"	Alex Grasshoff	Gloryette Clark	November 15, 1974
Rockford is hired by business tycoon Charles Dexter (Tim O'Connor) to find his much younger mistress, Susan (Lee Purcell). Her roommate, Louise (Linda Kelsey), will only give Rockford information if he allows her to join him in following it up, which takes the two of them to Las Vegas. A rival private investigator (Ron Soble) is following them, and further complications come from Susan’s odd habits at the roulette wheel and the source of the money she is gambling. Featuring Ron Soble, Joyce Jameson, Burke Byrnes and Bing Russell.
12	12	"Caledonia – It's Worth a Fortune"	Stuart Margolin (Angel Martin)	Story by : John Thomas James; Teleplay by : Juanita Bartlett	December 6, 1974
Jolene Hyland (Shelley Fabares) hires Rockford to protect her share of the $500,000 her husband stole and buried just before he was arrested. Her husband’s ex-partner (Richard Schaal), who Jolene was romantically involved with at the time of the theft, has half the directions to get to the hidden money, Jolene has the other half. Also after the money are two ex-cons (Sid Haig and William Traylor) from prison. Furthermore, the local sheriff (Ramon Bieri) always seems to be around. With Robert Ellenstein and Robert Ginty.
13	13	"Profit and Loss"	Lawrence Doheny	Story by : John Thomas James; Teleplay by : Stephen J. Cannell	December 20, 1974
14	14	"Profit and Loss"	Lawrence Doheny	Story by : John Thomas James; Teleplay by : Stephen J. Cannell	December 27, 1974
Part 1: A computer programmer for Fiscal Dynamics is abducted just as he is about to hire Rockford. When Jim tells the cops, he denies everything and Jim is charged with making a false police report. When the story makes the newspapers a woman hires Jim to investigate the suspicious death of her husband, who worked at the company. Part 2: Rockford is again threatened by the Fiscal Dynamics CEO, but despite his deep suspicions and best efforts he cannot get evidence against the company. Rockford is abducted at night by a genteel but sinister figure who is clear on what will happen to Jim if he continues his investigation. What will Rockford do? Ned Beatty as the company CEO, Paul Jenkins as his second in command, and Sharon Spelman as the suspicious widow. Also with guests Val Bisoglio as the owner of the printing shop that produces the company’s documentation, Michael Lerner as a shifty broker, John Carter, Priscilla Pointer and Joe E. Tata. Tom Rosqui as a broker who thinks Fiscal Dynamics is a hollow shell of a company, Albert Paulsen as the messenger who threatens Rockford’s life, and Barry Cahill.
15	15	"Aura Lee, Farewell"	Jackie Cooper	Story by : John Thomas James; Teleplay by : Edward J. Lakso	January 3, 1975
A hitchhiker, Aura Lee Benton (Melissa Greene), is picked up by state senator Evan Murdock (Robert Webber) and they have a one night stand. When leaving their motel he runs down a drunk who stumbled onto the road. The senator separates from Aura Lee and handles the accident with the police. Some time later she is found dead in her apartment, and Rockford's old friend Sara Butler (Lindsay Wagner) (his client in the pilot movie "Backlash of the Hunter") hires him to investigate. Jim discovers Aura Lee's connection with Murdock and questions him about it, and he seems unfazed. But soon afterward the senator too is found dead. With Greg Mullavey, Henry Slate, Bill Mumy and Linda Dano.
16	16	"Sleight of Hand"	William Wiard	Teleplay by : Stephen J. Cannell and Jo Swerling Jr. Based on the novel "Thin Air" by : Howard Browne	January 17, 1975
Rockford's girlfriend disappears mysteriously from her home at around the same time her neighbor is murdered, and the evidence does not support Rockford’s version of the day’s events. Lieutenant Diehl (Tom Atkins) suspects Rockford is responsible and orders him to stay away from the case. But Jim can't stop until he finds out what happened. Guests include Allan Miller, John Steadman, Gerald McRaney and Lara Parker.
17	17	"Counter Gambit"	Jackie Cooper	Howard Berk and Juanita Bartlett	January 24, 1975
Moss Williams (Eddie Fontaine), a tough convict about to be released from prison, hires Rockford to track down his girlfriend (Mary Frann). After Rockford dumps Moss over his bad temper, he’s approached by an insurance investigator (M. Emmet Walsh) to be an ‘inside man’ in finding a stolen pearl necklace in the possession of the girlfriend. Everything goes perfectly for Rockford, until Moss goes missing, the insurance company turns out to be non-existent, and the necklace gets stolen with all the evidence pointing to Rockford. To get out from under, Rockford needs the help of a very unwilling Angel (Stuart Margolin). Also with Burr DeBenning, Ford Rainey, Eric Server and Garry Walberg.
18	18	"Claire"	William Wiard	Edward J. Lakso and Stephen J. Cannell	January 31, 1975
Jim's old girlfriend Claire Prescott (Linda Evans), with whom he had a bad breakup, calls him asking for protection from two hoods. She is dubiously connected to a missing undercover policeman, which puts Rockford up against an angry police captain (Jackie Cooper) as well as the two thugs (Lance LeGault and Lane Smith). Also with Douglas Fowley.
19	19	"Say Goodbye to Jennifer"	Jackie Cooper	Story by : John Thomas James; Teleplay by : Juanita Bartlett and Rudolph Borchert	February 7, 1975
Rockford’s army buddy ‘Mitch’ (Hector Elizondo) is a photographer hopelessly smitten by a model (Pamela Hensley) who was suspected of committing a murder but was declared dead from a car accident before she was arrested. Shortly thereafter Mitch becomes convinced he saw her in Seattle and hires Rockford to find her. Jim is sure she's dead but has his own reasons to get out of town, so he accepts the job. With Ken Swofford, Regis Cordic, Katherine Woodville, Len Lesser and Thayer David.
20	20	"Charlie Harris at Large"	Russ Mayberry	Story by : John Thomas James; Teleplay by : Zekial Marko	February 14, 1975
Charlie Harris (Tony Musante), Rockford's former cellmate, is suspected of murdering his rich wife and has gone into hiding. He hires Rockford to find his alibi witness, a mystery woman with whom he was having an affair. She turns out to be Linda Bannister (Diana Muldaur), the wife of a multi-millionaire (Warner Anderson) who will kill to protect her secret. To compound matters Linda does not provide a perfect alibi, she is not sure Charlie is innocent, and Rockford gets charged with sheltering the fugitive Charlie. With David Spielberg as the police sergeant who is onto Rockford from the start, Mel Stewart and Eddie Firestone.
21	21	"The Four Pound Brick"	Lawrence Doheny	Story by : Leigh Brackett; Teleplay by : Leigh Brackett and Juanita Bartlett	February 21, 1975
Rocky (Noah Beery Jr.) hires Jim to investigate the death of a rookie policeman, the son of Rocky’s dear friend, Kate (Edith Atwater). However everything Rockford turns up indicates the young cop was on the take, and Lieutenant Diehl (Tom Atkins) will do everything in his power to suppress the information. Featuring William Watson, Jess Walton, Paul Carr, John Quade, Jack Knight, Frank Campanella, John Furlong, Dick Cherney, Duke Fishman, Bob Harks and Robert Hitchcock.
22	22	"Just by Accident"	Jerry London	Charles Sailor & Eric Kaldor	February 28, 1975
A businesswoman (Neva Patterson) hires Jim to investigate the death of her son in an automobile crash, she disputes it could have been an accident because he was a professional driver. The investigation uncovers a cache of phony birth certificates and a network of insurance fraudsters willing to commit multiple murder to keep the scams going. With Steven Keats, Joey Aresco, E. J. Peaker, David Spielberg, Fred Sadoff, Michael Fox, Fritzi Burr, Millie Slavi, Alan Bergmann, Beatrice Colen, Oliver Clark and Gordon Jump.
23	23	"Roundabout"	Lou Antonio	Story by : Mitchell Lindemann; Teleplay by : Mitchell Lindemann and Edward J. Lakso	March 7, 1975
Rockford is hired to deliver a $10,000 check to a young woman (Jesse Welles) in Las Vegas. He finds her living in poverty, but learns from a bank manager (George Wyner) there is an account in her name with $300,000 in it. After she gets abducted and he gets assaulted he finds her working as a singer in a luxury hotel. It has Rockford questioning what her manager (Ron Rifkin) is up to and how accurate his books are. With Mills Watson, Virginia Gregg, Joe E. Tata, Frank Michael Liu and Chuck Hicks.
