= Count =

Nobility title in European countries

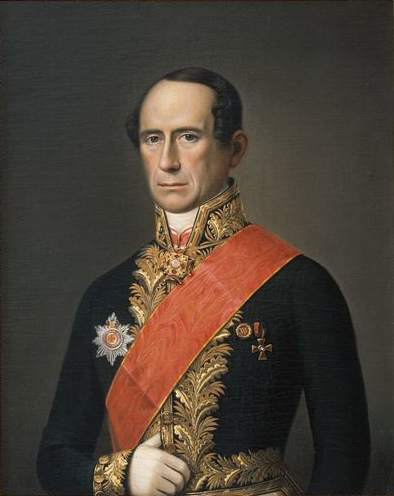
Count Carl Gustaf Mannerheim (1797–1854), the governor of the Viipuri Province, entomologist and the grandfather of Baron C. G. E. Mannerheim.

Count or Countess is a historical title of nobility in certain European countries, varying in relative status, generally of middling rank in the hierarchy of nobility. Especially in earlier medieval periods the term often implied not only a certain status, but also that the count had specific responsibilities or offices. The etymologically related English term "county" denoted the territories associated with some countships, but not all.

The title of count is typically not used in England or English-speaking countries, with the equivalent title earl used instead. As a feminine form of earl never developed, the female equivalent countess is retained.

== Origin of the term ==
The word count came into English from the French comte, itself from Latin comes—in its accusative form comitem. In Latin, which continued to be used throughout the Middle Ages, the word literally meant "companion" or "attendant", and as a title it indicated that someone was delegated to represent the ruler.

In the late Roman Empire, the Latin title comes denoted the high rank of various courtiers and provincial officials, either military or administrative. Before Anthemius became emperor in the West in 467, he was a military comes charged with strengthening defenses on the Danube frontier.

In the Western Roman Empire, "count" came to indicate generically a military commander but was not a specific rank. In the Eastern Roman Empire, from about the seventh century, "count" was a specific rank indicating the commander of two centuriae (i.e., 200 men).

The medieval title of comes was, as in the Roman empire, originally not hereditary. It was regarded as an administrative official dependent on the king, until the process of allodialisation during the 9th century in which such titles came to be private possessions of noble families. By virtue of their large estates, many counts could pass the title to their heirs—but not always. For instance, in Piast Poland, the position of komes was not hereditary, resembling the early Merovingian institution. The title had disappeared by the era of the Polish–Lithuanian Commonwealth, and the office had been replaced by others. Only after the Partitions of Poland did the title of "count" resurface in the title hrabia, derived from the German Graf.

In the Frankish kingdoms in the early Middle Ages, a count might also be a count palatine, whose authority derived directly over a royal household, a palace in its original sense of the seat of power and administration. This other kind of count had vague antecedents in Late Antiquity too: the father of Cassiodorus held positions of trust with Theodoric, as comes rerum privatarum, in charge of the imperial lands, then as comes sacrarum largitionum ("count of the sacred doles"), concerned with the finances of the realm.

=== Land attached to title ===
It is only after some time that the continental medieval title came to be strongly associated with the ownership of and jurisdiction over specific lands, which led to evolution of the term county to refer to specific regions. The English term county, used as an equivalent to the English term shire, is derived from the Old French conté or cunté which denoted the jurisdiction of a French count or viscount. The modern French is comté, and its equivalents in other languages are contea, contado, comtat, condado, Grafschaft, graafschap, etc. (cf. conte, comte, conde, Graf). The title of Count also continued to exist in cases which are not connected to any specific to a geographical "county".

In the United Kingdom, the equivalent "Earl" can also be used as a courtesy title for the eldest son of a duke or marquess. In the Italian states, by contrast, all the sons of certain counts were little counts (contini). In Sweden there is a distinction between counts (Swedish: greve) created before and after 1809. All children in comital families elevated before 1809 were called count/countess. In families elevated after 1809, only the head of the family was called count, the rest have a status similar to barons and were called by the equivalent of "Mr/Ms/Mrs", before the recognition of titles of nobility was abolished.

== Comital titles in different European languages ==
The following lists are originally based on a Glossary on Heraldica.org by Alexander Krischnig. The male form is followed by the female, and when available, by the territorial circumscription.

=== Etymological derivations from the Latin comes ===
Language	Male title	Female title/Spouse	Territory/Notes
Albanian	Kont	Konteshë	Konte
Armenian	Կոմս (Koms)	Կոմսուհի (Komsuhi)	
Bulgarian	Кмет (Kmet), present meaning: mayor; medieval (9th-century) Комит (Komit): hereditary provincial ruler	Кметица (Kmetitsa), woman mayor Кметша (Kmetsha), mayor's wife	Кметство (Kmetstvo); medieval Комитат (Komitat)
Catalan	Comte	Comtessa	Comtat
English	Count	Countess (even where Earl applies)	Earldom for an Earl; Countship or county for a count. (County persists in English-speaking countries as a sub-national administrative division.) "Count" applies to titles granted by monarchies other than the British, for which Earl applies.
French	Comte	Comtesse	Comté
Greek	Κόμης (Kómēs)	Κόμησσα (Kómēssa)	Κομητεία (Komēteía); in the Ionian Islands the corresponding Italianate terms κόντες kóntes, κοντέσσα kontéssa were used instead.
Hungarian	Vikomt	Vikomtessz	Actually meaning viscount. These forms are now archaic or literary; Gróf is used instead.
Irish	Cunta	Cuntaois	Honorary title only.
Italian	Conte	Contessa	Contea, Contado
Latin (medieval and later; not classical)	Comes	Comitissa	Comitatus
Maltese	Konti	Kontessa	
Monegasque	Conte	Contessa	
Portuguese	Conde	Condessa	Condado
Romanian	Conte	Contesă	Comitat
Romansh	Cont	Contessa	
Spanish	Conde	Condesa	Condado
Turkish	Kont	Kontes	Kontluk

=== Etymological derivations from German Graf or Dutch Graaf ===
Language	Male title	Female title / Spouse	Territory
Afrikaans	Graaf	Gravin	Graafskap
Belarusian	Граф (Hraf)	Графiня (Hrafinia)	Графствa (Hrafstva)
Bulgarian	Граф (Graf)	Графиня (Grafinya)	Графство (Grafstvo)
Croatian	Grof	Grofica	Grofovija
Czech	Hrabě	Hraběnka	Hrabství
Danish	Greve	Grevinde (Count's wife); Komtesse (Unmarried daughter of a count)	Grevskab
Dutch	Graaf	Gravin	Graafschap
English	Grave (for example Landgrave, Margrave), reeve, sheriff	Gravin	Graviate
Estonian	Krahv	Krahvinna	Krahvkond
Finnish	Kreivi	Kreivitär	Kreivikunta
German	Graf	Gräfin	Grafschaft
Greek	Γράβος (Gravos)		
Georgian	გრაფი/თავადი (Grapi/Tavadi)	გრაფინია/თავადი (Grapinia/Tavadi)	საგრაფო/სათავადო (Sagrapo /Satavado)
Hungarian	Gróf	Grófnő (born a countess), Grófné (married to a count)	Grófság
Icelandic	Greifi	Greifynja	Greifadæmi
Latvian	Grāfs	Grāfiene	Grāfiste
Lithuanian	Grafas	Grafienė	Grafystė
Luxembourgish	Grof	Gréifin	
Macedonian	Гроф (Grof)	Грофица (Grofica)	Грофовија (Grofovija)
Norwegian	Greve/Greive	Grevinne	Grevskap
Polish	Hrabia, Margrabia (non-native titles)	Hrabina, Margrabina (non-native titles)	Hrabstwo (translation of foreign term "county")
Romanian	Grof (also Conte, see above), Greav	Grofiță	
Russian	Граф (Graf)	Графиня (Grafinya)	Графство (Grafstvo)
Serbian	Гроф (Grof)	Грофица (Grofica)	Грофовија (Grofovija)
Slovak	Gróf	Grófka	Grófstvo
Slovene	Grof	Grofica	Grofija
Swedish	Greve	Grevinna	Grevskap
Ukrainian	Граф (Hraf)	Графиня (Hrafynya)	Графство (Hrafstvo)

=== Compound and related titles ===
Apart from all these, a few unusual titles have been of comital rank, not necessarily permanently.

- Dauphin (English: Dolphin; Spanish: Delfín; Italian: Delfino; Portuguese: Delfim; Latin: Delphinus) was a multiple (though rare) comital title in southern France, used by the Dauphins of Vienne and Auvergne, before 1349 when it became the title of the heir to the French throne. The Dauphin was the lord of the province still known as the région Dauphiné.
- Conde-Duque "Count-Duke" is a rare title used in Spain, notably by Gaspar de Guzmán, Count-Duke of Olivares. He had inherited the title of count of Olivares, but when created Duke of Sanlucar la Mayor by King Philip IV of Spain he begged permission to preserve his inherited title in combination with the new honour—according to a practice almost unique in Spanish history; logically the incumbent ranks as Duke (higher than Count) just as he would when simply concatenating both titles.
- Conde-Barão 'Count-Baron' is a rare title used in Portugal, notably by Dom Luís Lobo da Silveira, 7th Baron of Alvito, who received the title of Count of Oriola in 1653 from King John IV of Portugal. His palace in Lisbon still exists, located in a square named after him (Largo do Conde-Barão).
- Archcount is a very rare title, etymologically analogous to archduke, apparently never recognized officially, used by or for:
  - the count of Flanders (an original pairie of the French realm in present Belgium, very rich, once expected to be raised to the rank of kingdom); the informal, rather descriptive use on account of the countship's de facto importance is rather analogous to the unofficial epithet Grand Duc de l'Occident (before Grand duke became a formal title) for the even wealthier Duke of Burgundy
  - at least one Count of Burgundy (i.e. Freigraf of Franche-Comté)
- In German kingdoms, the title Graf was combined with the word for the jurisdiction or domain the nobleman was holding as a fief or as a conferred or inherited jurisdiction, such as Markgraf (see also Marquess), Landgraf, Freigraf ("free count"), Burggraf, where Burg signifies castle; see also Viscount, Pfalzgraf (translated both as "Count Palatine" and, historically, as "Palsgrave"), Raugraf ("Raugrave", see "Graf", and Waldgraf (comes nemoris), where Wald signifies a large forest) (from Latin nemus = grove).
- The German Graf and Dutch graaf (Latin: grafio) stem from the Byzantine-Greek γραφεύς grapheus meaning "he who calls a meeting [i.e. the court] together").
- The Ottoman military title of Serdar was used in Montenegro and Serbia as a lesser noble title with the equivalent rank of a Count.
- These titles are not to be confused with various minor administrative titles containing the word -graf in various offices which are not linked to feudal nobility, such as the Dutch titles Pluimgraaf (a court sinecure, so usually held by noble courtiers, may even be rendered hereditary) and Dijkgraaf (to the present, in the Low Countries, a manager in the local or regional administration of watercourses through dykes, ditches, controls etc.; also in German Deichgraf, synonymous with Deichhauptmann, "dike captain").

== Lists of countships ==
=== Territory of today's France ===
==== Kingdom of the Western Franks ====
Since Louis VII (1137–80), the highest precedence amongst the vassals (Prince-bishops and secular nobility) of the French crown was enjoyed by those whose benefice or temporal fief was a pairie, i.e. carried the exclusive rank of pair; within the first (i.e. clerical) and second (noble) estates, the first three of the original twelve anciennes pairies were ducal, the next three comital comté-pairies:

- Bishop-counts of Beauvais (in Picardy)
- Bishop-counts of Châlons (in Champagne)
- Bishop-counts of Noyon (in Picardy)
- Count of Toulouse, until united to the crown in 1271 by marriage
- Count of Flanders (Flandres in French), which is in the Low countries and was confiscated in 1299, though returned in 1303
- Count of Champagne, until united to the crown (in 1316 by marriage, conclusively in 1361)

Later other countships (and duchies, even baronies) have been raised to this French peerage, but mostly as apanages (for members of the royal house) or for foreigners; after the 16th century all new peerages were always duchies and the medieval countship-peerages had died out, or were held by royal princes

Other French countships of note included those of:

- Count of Angoulême, later Duke
- Count of Anjou, later Duke
- Count of Auvergne
- Count of Bar, later Duke
- Count of Blois
- Count of Boulogne
- Count of Foix
- Count of Montpensier
- Count of Poitiers

==== Parts of today's France long within other kingdoms of the Holy Roman Empire ====
- Freigraf ("free count") of Burgundy (i.e. present Franche-Comté)
- The Dauphiné

=== The Holy Roman Empire ===
See also above for parts of present France

==== In Germany ====
A Graf ruled over a territory known as a Grafschaft ('county'). See also various comital and related titles; especially those actually reigning over a principality: Gefürsteter Graf, Landgraf, Reichsgraf; compare Markgraf, Burggraf, Pfalzgraf (see Imperial quaternions).

==== Northern Italian states ====
The title of Conte is very prolific on the peninsula. In the eleventh century, Conti like the Count of Savoy or the Norman Count of Apulia, were virtually sovereign lords of broad territories. Even apparently "lower"-sounding titles, like Viscount, could describe powerful dynasts, such as the House of Visconti which ruled a major city such as Milan. The essential title of a feudatory, introduced by the Normans, was signore, modeled on the French seigneur, used with the name of the fief. By the fourteenth century, conte and the Imperial title barone were virtually synonymous.

Some titles of a count, according to the particulars of the patent, might be inherited by the eldest son of a Count. Younger brothers might be distinguished as "X dei conti di Y" ("X of the counts of Y"). However, if there is no male to inherit the title and the count has a daughter, in some regions she could inherit the title.

Many Italian counts left their mark on Italian history as individuals, yet only a few contadi (countships; the word contadini for inhabitants of a "county" remains the Italian word for "peasant") were politically significant principalities, notably:

- Norman Count of Apulia
- Count of Savoy, later Duke (also partly in France and in Switzerland)
- Count of Asti
- Count of Montferrat (Monferrato)
- Count of Montefeltro
- Count of Tusculum

==== In Austria ====
The principalities tended to start out as margraviate or (promoted to) duchy, and became nominal archduchies within the Habsburg dynasty; noteworthy are:

- Count of Tyrol
- Count of Cilli
- Count of Schaumburg

==== In the Low Countries ====
Apart from various small ones, significant were:

- in present-day Belgium:
  - Count of Flanders (Vlaanderen in Dutch), but only the small part east of the river Schelde remained within the empire; the far larger west, an original French comté-pairie became part of the French realm
  - Count of Hainaut
  - Count of Namur, later a margraviate
  - Count of Leuven (Louvain), later a dukedom
  - Count of Loon
- in the presentday Netherlands:
  - Count of Guelders later Dukes of Guelders
  - Count of Holland
  - Count of Zeeland
  - Count of Zutphen

==== In Switzerland ====
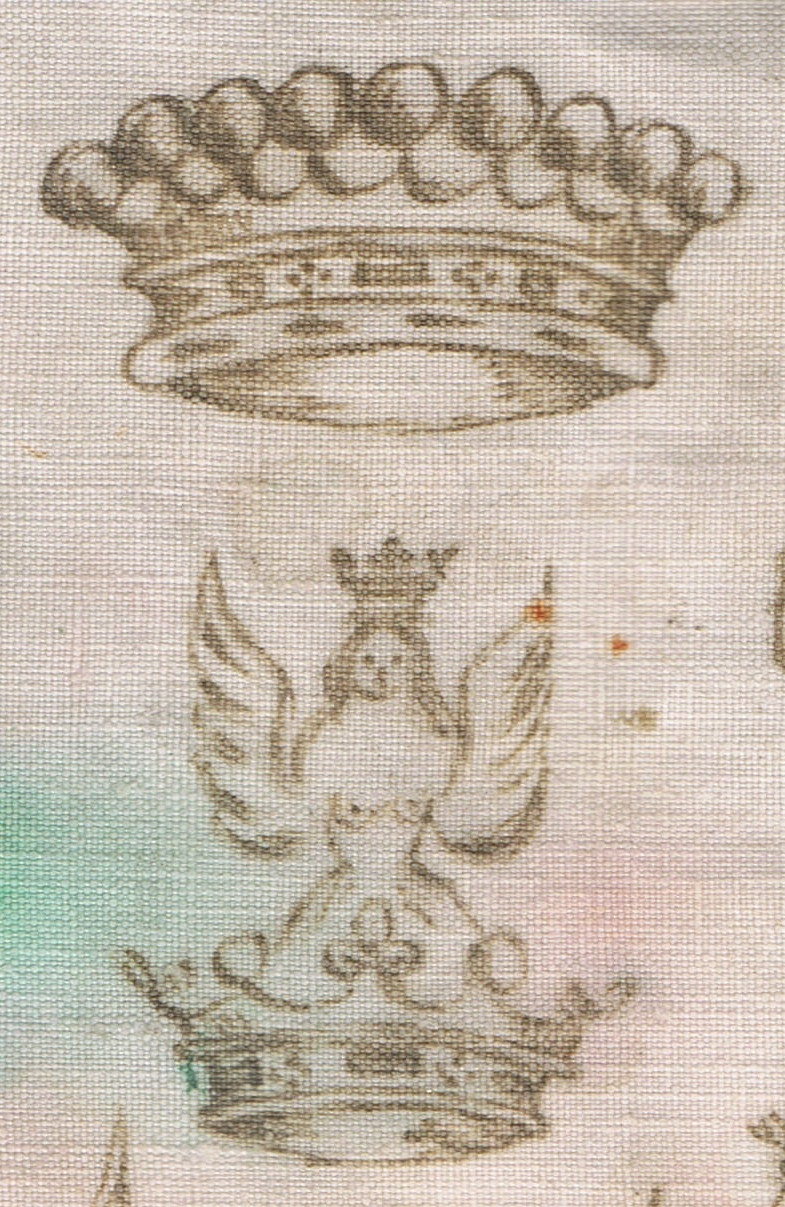
Comital ephemera: a Count's coronet and crest on a doily.

- Count of Geneva
- Count of Neuchâtel
- Count of Toggenburg
- Count of Kyburg
- Count de Salis-Soglio (also in the UK, Canada and Australia)
- Count de Salis-Seewis
- Count of Panzutti

=== In other continental European countries ===
==== Holy See ====
Count/Countess was one of the noble titles granted by the Pope as a temporal sovereign, and the title's holder was sometimes informally known as a papal count/papal countess or less so as a Roman count/Roman countess, but mostly as count/countess. The comital title, which could be for life or hereditary, was awarded in various forms by popes and Holy Roman Emperors since the Middle Ages, infrequently before the 14th century, and the pope continued to grant the comital and other noble titles even after 1870, it was largely discontinued in the mid 20th-century, on the accession of John XXIII. The Papacy and the Kingdom of the Two Sicilies might appoint counts palatine with no particular territorial fief. Until 1812 in some regions, the purchaser of land designated "feudal" was ennobled by the noble seat that he held and became a conte. This practice ceased with the formal abolition of feudalism in the various principalities of early-19th century Italy, last of all in the Papal States.

==== In Poland ====
Poland was notable throughout its history for not granting titles of nobility. This was on the premise that one could only be born into nobility, outside rare exceptions. Instead, it conferred non-hereditary courtly or civic roles. The noble titles that were in use on its territory were mostly of foreign provenance and usually subject to the process of indygenat, naturalisation.

==== In Hungary ====
Somewhat similar to the native privileged class of nobles found in Poland, Hungary also had a class of Conditional nobles.

==== On the Iberian peninsula ====
As opposed to the plethora of hollow "gentry" counts, only a few countships ever were important in medieval Iberia; most territory was firmly within the Reconquista kingdoms before counts could become important. However, during the 19th century, the title, having lost its high rank (equivalent to that of Duke), proliferated.

===== Portugal =====
Portugal itself started as a countship in 868, but became a kingdom in 1139 (see:County of Portugal). Throughout the history of Portugal, especially during the constitutional monarchy many other countships were created.

===== Spain =====
Coronet of a count (Spanish heraldry)

In Spain, no countships of wider importance exist, except in the former Spanish march.

- County of Barcelona, the initial core of the Principality of Catalonia, later one of the states of the Crown of Aragon, which became one of the two main components of the Spanish crown.
- Count of Aragon
- Count of Castile
- Count of Galicia
- Count of Lara
- Count Cassius, progenitor of the Banu Qasi
- County of Urgell, later integrated into the Principality of Catalonia.
- The other Catalan counties were much smaller and were absorbed early into the County of Barcelona (between parentheses the annexation year): County of Girona (897), County of Besalú, County of Osona, which included the nominal County of Manresa (1111), County of Berga and County of Conflent (1117) and County of Cerdanya (1118). From 1162 these counties, together with that of Barcelona, were merged into the Principality of Catalonia, a sovereign state that absorbed some other counties: County of Roussillon (1172), County of Pallars Jussà (1192), County of Empúries (1402), County of Urgell (1413) and County of Pallars Sobirà (1487), giving the Principality its definitive shape.

=== South Eastern Europe ===
==== Bulgaria ====
In the First Bulgarian Empire, a komit was a hereditary provincial ruler under the tsar documented since the reign of Presian (836-852) The Cometopouli dynasty was named after its founder, the komit of Sredets.

==== Montenegro and Serbia ====
The title of Serdar was used in the Principality of Montenegro and the Principality of Serbia as a noble title below that of Voivode equivalent to that of Count.

=== Crusader states ===
- Count of Edessa
- Count of Tripoli (1102–1288)

=== Scandinavia ===
In Denmark and historically in Denmark-Norway the title of count (greve) is the highest rank of nobility used in the modern period. Some Danish/Dano-Norwegian countships were associated with fiefs, and these counts were known as "feudal counts" (lensgreve). They rank above ordinary (titular) counts, and their position in the Danish aristocracy as the highest-ranking noblemen is broadly comparable to that of dukes in other European countries. With the first free Constitution of Denmark of 1849 came a complete abolition of the privileges of the nobility. Since then the title of count has been granted only to members of the Danish royal family, either as a replacement for a princely title when marrying a commoner, or in recent times, instead of that title in connection with divorce. Thus the first wife of Prince Joachim of Denmark, the younger son of Margrethe II of Denmark, became Alexandra, Countess of Frederiksborg on their divorce—initially retaining her title of princess, but losing it on her remarriage.

In the Middle Ages the title of jarl (earl) was the highest title of nobility. The title was eventually replaced by the title of duke, but that title was abolished in Denmark and Norway as early as the Middle Ages. Titles were only reintroduced with the introduction of absolute monarchy in 1660, with count as the highest title.

In Sweden the rank of count is the highest rank conferred upon nobles in the modern era and are, like their Danish and Norwegian counterparts, broadly comparable to that of dukes in other European countries. Unlike the rest of Scandinavia, the title of duke is still used in Sweden, but only by members of the royal family not considered part of the nobility.

== Equivalents ==
Like other major Western noble titles, Count is sometimes used to render certain titles in non-western languages with their own traditions, even though they are as a rule historically unrelated and thus hard to compare, but which are considered "equivalent" in rank.

This is the case with:

- the Chinese Bó (伯), or "Bojue" (伯爵), hereditary title of nobility ranking below Hóu (侯) and above Zĭ (子)
- Earl of Britain
- the Japanese equivalent Hakushaku (伯爵), adapted during the Meiji restoration
- the Korean equivalent Baekjak (백작) or Poguk
- in Vietnam, it is rendered Bá, one of the lower titles reserved for male members of the Imperial clan, above Tử (Viscount), Nam (Baron) and Vinh phong (lowest noble title), but lower than—in ascending order—Hầu (Marquis), Công (Prince), Quận-Công (Duke/Duke of a commandery) and Quốc-Công (Grand Duke/Duke of the Nation), all under Vương (King) and Hoàng Đế (Emperor).
- the Indian Sardar, adopted by the Maratha Empire, additionally, Jagirdar and Deshmukh are close equivalents
- the Arabic equivalent Sheikh
- In traditional Sulu equivalent of Datu Sadja

== In fiction ==
The title "Count" in fiction is commonly, though not always, given to evil characters, used as another word for prince or vampires (the latter due to the title's association with Dracula):

- Count Nefaria
- Count Vertigo
- Count von Count
- Count Duckula
- Count Olaf
- Count Chocula
- Count Paris
- Count of Monte Cristo
- Count Dooku
- Count Dracula
- Count Orlok
- Count Arthur Strong
- Count Binface

== See also ==
- Czech nobility
- Icelandic nobility
- Romanian nobility
- Russian nobility
- Viscount
- Earl

== Sources ==
- Labarre de Raillicourt: Les Comtes Romains
- Westermann, Großer Atlas zur Weltgeschichte (in German)
