= Black Roses (1988 film) =

1988 film by John Fasano

- Directed by: John Fasano
- Screenplay by: Cindy Sorrell
- Produced by: Ray Van Doorn; John M. Fasano
- Starring: John Martin; Ken Swofford; Julie Adams; Carla Ferrigno
- Cinematography: Paul Mitchnick
- Edited by: Ray Van Doorn
- Music by: Elliot Solomon
- Distributed by: Shapiro-Glickenhaus Entertainment
- Release date: December 1988 (Home video)
- Country: Canada
- Language: English

Black Roses is a 1988 Canadian horror film directed by John Fasano and starring John Martin, Ken Swofford, Julie Adams, and Carla Ferrigno. The film's soundtrack features many bands of the era, including King Kobra, Tempest, Hallow's Eve and Lizzy Borden, among others. Most of the music for the band Black Roses was performed by the members of King Kobra

== Plot ==
Matthew Moorhouse is a high school teacher working in the small town of Mill Basin. One day, a heavy metal band named Black Roses arrives to play for three nights, after which they will move to their next destination. While the town's conservative parents are initially resistant, their concerns are mollified by the band's initially low-key appearance and by the town's mayor assuming that the band is harmless. This doesn't sit well with Matthew, who senses that the band has something more sinister in mind than just playing music.

As the performances continue, the teens go from normal to homicidal and antisocial. Their parents also begin to die in various ways, with some being murdered and one being devoured by a record player and speaker. Matthew's favorite student Julie murders his ex-girlfriend Priscilla Farnsworth, as she saw her as a rival for Matthew's affections. Horrified and afraid of what will happen if the third performance goes unstopped, Matthew decides to burn down the performance hall. Despite some resistance from the band leader Damian, who transforms into a demon, Matthew is successful in both setting the fire and also waking the teens from their trance. While the band appears to burn with the hall, Matthew and the town's mayor discover via the news some time later that not only did Black Roses survive, they recently played a large concert in New York City and plan to travel overseas to the UK.

== Cast ==
- John Martin as Matthew Moorhouse
- Ken Swofford as Mayor Farnsworth
- Sal Viviano as Damian
- Julie Adams as Mrs. Miller
- Carmine Appice as Vinny Apache
- Peter Bontje as Flunkie
- Anthony C. Bua as Tony Ames
- Dave Crichton as Mr. Miller
- Jesse D'Angelo as Jason Miller
- Carla Ferrigno as Priscilla Farnsworth
- Margaret Groome as Mrs. Sullivan
- Frank Dietz as Johnny Pratt
- Vincent Pastore as Tony's Dad

=== Black Roses ===
Original music performed by:

- Marcie Free – lead vocals
- Mick Sweda – lead guitar
- Alex Masi – rhythm guitar
- Carmine Appice – drums
- Chuck Wright – bass guitar
- Elliot Solomon – keyboards

== Production ==
Black Roses had a higher budget than Fasano's previous works, such as Zombie Nightmare, which he wrote, and Rock 'n' Roll Nightmare, which he directed. Fasano said that, after Rock 'n' Roll Nightmare, which he stated was shot for about $52,000 and made "like $400,000 in sales", Shapiro Glickenhaus approached him and offered him $400,000 to make Black Roses. However, during the promotion of the film, Fasano stated the film's budget was slightly under one million American dollars.

The film was shot in Canada, as distributors would get a better tax deal for films when shot there. Fasano later stated that the film was shot in Hamilton under the recommendation of Paul Mitchnick, as he thought it resembled an American industrial town. According to Fasano, the owners of the house in Toronto that was used for Black Roses were in the middle of a divorce. When arriving for the last day of shooting at the house, the crew found all the doors had been locked and the lights turned out.

The special effects artists hired for the film were Richard Platt and Michael Maddi, after veteran make-up artist Dick Smith recommended them. The special effects team felt they were pressured by the eight-week shooting schedule of the film. The opening scene with the demon band took three weeks to complete, with Platt stating that the team were "putting in 16 and 20-hour days."

== Release ==
While an article in Fangoria originally had Black Roses scheduled for a theatrical release in autumn of 1988, the film was first released on home video, by VPD that December. The film was later released on DVD in the United States by Synapse Films in 2007.

== Reception ==
From contemporary reviews, "Lor." of Variety commented that "interesting makeup effects are the film's highlight" and concluded that "There are some sexy scenes, but Creature From the Black Lagoon alumna Julie Adams has little to do here."

== Soundtrack ==
The soundtrack was released on compact disc in 1988 by Metal Blade Records. In a review for AllMusic, Bradley Torreano noted that, while drummer Carmine Appice had assembled the group Black Roses, the material was weaker than his work with Rod Stewart and Ozzy Osbourne. He also opined that the four songs contributed by Black Roses included "two dull party songs", and that while the power ballad "Paradise (We're on Our Way)" was "oddly listenable", the other tracks were "quite terrible".

=== Track listing ===
1. Black Roses – "Dance on Fire"
2. Black Roses / Masi – "Soldiers of the Night"
3. Bang Tango – "I'm No Stranger"
4. Black Roses / Masi – "Rock Invasion"
5. Black Roses – "Paradise (We're on Our Way)"
6. Lizzy Borden – "Me Against the World"
7. King Kobra – "Take It Off"
8. David Michael-Phillips – "King of Kool"
9. Tempest – "Streetlife Warrior"
10. Hallow's Eve – "D.I.E."
