= Countess (band) =

Dutch black metal band

- Origin: Leiden, Netherlands
- Genres: Black metal
- Years active: 1992–present
- Labels: Barbarian Wrath
- Members: Orlok, Valgard, Mortüüm, Häxa
- Past members: Othalaz, Vercingetorix, Zénon, Imogem, Warhead, Zagan, Wolfram, Herjann
- Website: Official Website

Countess is a black metal band from the Netherlands. Formed in 1992, they have released more than a dozen full-length albums and are considered one of the most eminent Dutch black metal bands. After years of being a solo project, as of 2014, they are a band again and play live.

== Discography ==
List of releases according to official website:

- 1992: Permafrost Demo
- 1993: The Gospel of the Horned One CD
- 1994: The Wolves Awake Demo
- 1994: Doomed to Live Livetape
- 1994: The Return of the Horned One CD
- 1995: The Wrath of Satan's Whore Cassette EP
- 1995: Ad Maiorem Sathanae Gloriam CD
- 1996: Live in Berlin Livetape
- 1996: The Book of the Heretic CD
- 1997: Hell's Rock & Roll MCD
- 2000: The Shining Swords of Hate CD
- 2001: The Revenge of the Horned One Part I CD
- 2002: The Revenge of the Horned One Part II CD
- 2003: Orgasmatron Split 7"
- 2004: Heilig Vuur CD
- 2005: Spawn of Steel CD
- 2006: Holocaust of the God Believers CD
- 2007: Blazing Flames of War CD
- 2010: Burning Scripture CD
- 2011: On Wings of Defiance CD
- 2013: Sermons of the Infidel Digital album
- 2014: Ancient Lies And Battle Cries CD
- 2014: Sermons of the Infidel CD
- 2016: Fires Of Destiny CD
- 2017: Into Battle Cassette/CD
- 2021: Banners Of Blood CD
- 2023: Live By The Sword EP
