= Ken Swofford =

American actor (1933–2018)

- Born: Kenneth Charles Swofford; July 25, 1933; Du Quoin, Illinois, U.S.
- Died: November 1, 2018 (aged 85); Pacific Grove, California, U.S.
- Education: Southern Illinois University Carbondale (BSc)
- Occupations: Actor; voice actor; script writer
- Years active: 1962–2004; 2018
- Known for: Fame; Thelma & Louise; Gunsmoke; Murder, She Wrote; The Andromeda Strain
- Spouse: Barbee Biggs (m. 1958)
- Children: 5

Kenneth Charles Swofford (July 25, 1933 – November 1, 2018) was an American film and television actor. With his burly build and distinctive red hair he was often cast in villain, police officer or 'everyman' roles.

Between 1962 and 1995, Swofford's film credits included Thelma & Louise, Skyjacked, Black Roses and The Andromeda Strain, while his TV career during the same period was prolific. He appeared on such television series as Gunsmoke; Police Story; The Rockford Files; Simon & Simon; Fame; Switch; The Oregon Trail; Rich Man, Poor Man Book II; Murder, She Wrote; and as a cast member of the mystery series Ellery Queen.

== Life and career ==
Ken Swofford graduated from Southern Illinois University-Carbondale in 1959 with a Bachelor of Science degree in theater.

In an interview in 1976, the distinctive, red-headed actor described the advantages of an acting career as spending more time with his children and having the freedom to do any job. "If you're an actor, you can do anything. I have cleaned carpets, painted houses, worked on loading docks. It didn't bother me, because I could always act and enjoy myself."

He met and married Barbee Biggs in summer stock in 1958; the couple had five children. In a Los Angeles Times interview in 1985 titled "Autistic Youth Thrives in Large, Loving Family", the Swoffords discussed bringing up their autistic son Brendan at home.

In 1989, Swofford was convicted of felony drunk driving and sentenced to 28 months in prison, after which he made a comeback and continued to work steadily until retiring in 1995. In 2001, he supplied the voice of the coach in Recess: School's Out, and played Officer White in Teacher's Pet (2004), which was his last role before retiring permanently. Nonetheless, in 2018 he voiced the title character of Happy the Angry Polar Bear in a film written and directed by his grandson, Brandon.

== Death ==
Swofford died on November 1, 2018, aged 85, in Pacific Grove, California. His death was announced by his grandson Brandon on Twitter.

== Filmography ==
- Captain Newman, M.D. (1963) — Patient (uncredited)
- Father Goose (1964) — Helmsman, Submarine USS Sailfin (uncredited)
- First to Fight (1967) — O'Brien
- Gunfight in Abilene (1967) — Rebel Soldier (uncredited)
- How Much Loving Does a Normal Couple Need? (1967) — Barney Rickert / ex-detective
- The Lawyer (1970) — Charlie O'Keefe
- The Andromeda Strain (1970) — Toby (technician)
- Bless the Beasts and Children (1971) — Wheaties
- Skyjacked (1972) — John Bimonte
- One Little Indian (1973) — Pvt. Dixon
- A Cry for Help (1975, TV Movie) — Paul Church
- The Black Bird (1975) — Brad McCormack
- The Domino Principle (1977) — Ditcher
- Sultan and the Rock Star (1980, TV Movie) - George McKinzie
- S.O.B. (1981) — Harold Harrigan
- Annie (1982) — Weasel
- Bridge Across Time (1985, TV Movie) — Ed Nebel
- Hunter's Blood (1986) — Al Coleman
- The Stepford Children (1987, TV Movie) — Frank Gregson
- Black Roses (1988) — Mayor Farnsworth
- Thelma & Louise (1991) — Major
- The Taking of Beverly Hills (1991) — Coach
- Cops n Roberts (1995)
- Recess: School's Out (2001) — Coach (voice)
- Teacher's Pet (2004) — Officer White (voice)

=== Television ===
- Surfside 6 (1962) — Garth
- The Big Valley (1966) — Wes
- Cimarron Strip (1967) — Christie
- Gunsmoke (1967–1975) — Dunbar / Jake Fielder / Harkey / Dirk / Speer / Harry / Bronk / Loomis / Guffy / Sugar John / Bo Warrick
- I Spy (1968) — Clay
- Daniel Boone (1968) — Mick O'Toole
- Adam-12 (1968) — Floyd Delman
- The Virginian (1968–1969) — Seth Pettit / Wrengell
- Here Come the Brides (1969) — Janitor / Gil
- The F.B.I. (1969) — Honky-tonk bookkeeper
- The Odd Couple (1970) — Cop
- The Intruders (1970) — Pomerantz
- Mission: Impossible (1970–1971) — Deputy Mayor Charles Peck / Florian Vaclav
- The Partridge Family (1970–1974) — Coach / Monty
- The Rookies (1972–1973) — Mr. Felker
- The Streets of San Francisco (1973) — Herman Ledeker, Bus Driver
- Columbo: Candidate for Crime (1973) — Harry Stone
- The Waltons (1974) — Red Turner
- Kung Fu (1974) — Dr. Tracer / Max Frazer
- Paper Moon (1974) — Angus
- Police Story (1974–1977) — Lieutenant / Lieutenant Pete Telenda / Officer Turner / Alfonso Taluga / Morgan
- Petrocelli (1975–1976) — Lt. John Clifford / Lieutenant John Clifford / Phillip Armor
- Ellery Queen (1975–1976) — Frank Flannigan
- The Rockford Files (1975–1979) — Col. John 'Howling Mad' Smith / Carl Wronko / DEA Agent Al Jollett / FBI Agent Patrick / P.I. Floyd Ross
- The Six Million Dollar Man (1977–1978) — Dan Kelly / Roy Palmer
- The Eddie Capra Mysteries (1978) — J.J. Devlin
- Battlestar Galactica (1979) — General Maxwell in "Experiment in Terra"
- How the West Was Won (1979) — Grimes
- Walking Tall (1981) — Ed Morgan
- The Incredible Hulk (1981) — Johnny
- Fantasy Island (1981) — Fix
- Trapper John, M.D. (1982–1983) — The Chief / Mr. Stone
- Dynasty (1982–1988) — Lt. Holliman / Lieutenant
- Simon & Simon (1982–1988) — Chester Sullivan — SIA Liaison / Chief of Security Warren Parton / Lloyd Getz
- Knots Landing (1983) — Sheriff Pickett
- Fame (1983–1985) — Vice Principal Quentin Morloch
- Hardcastle and McCormick (1985) — Chuck Foster
- The A-Team (1985) — Park Ranger Roy Sherman
- Murder, She Wrote (1985–1992) — Lt. Catalano / Sheriff Tugman / Sid Sharkey / Grover Barth / Leo Kowalski
- Knight Rider (1986) — Nick O'Brien
- Remington Steele (1986) — Michael Harrigan
- Scarecrow and Mrs. King (1986) — Mr. Davis
- Falcon Crest (1987) — March Ridley
- The Law & Harry McGraw (1987) — Ed DeMarco
- Max Headroom (1987) — Gorrister
- Ohara (1987) — Crowley
- Highway to Heaven (1987) — Jack Kelly
- Our House (1988) — Baxter
- The Highwayman (1988) — The Mayor
- Murphy's Law (1988) — Max Corkle
- The Wonder Years (1988) — Al (Kevin Father's Chief)
- Mancuso, F.B.I. (1990) — Senator John Bloomingdale
- The New Adam-12 (1991) — Mr. Crebs
- Matlock (1991) — Ned Salem
- Baywatch (1991–1992) — Lyle Connors
- Diagnosis: Murder (1994) — Rupert Leverton
