= George Sherman (disambiguation) =

George Sherman (1908–1991) was an American film director and producer.

George Sherman may also refer to:

- George Sherman (publicist) (1928–1974), publicist and head of the Publications Department at the Disney Studio
- George C. Sherman (1799–1853), New York politician
- George Carter Sherman Sr. (1880–1933), American polo player
- George C. Sherman Jr. (c. 1911–1986), American polo player
- George Dallas Sherman (1844–1927), military band leader
