= Lincoln Kilpatrick =

American actor (1932–2004)

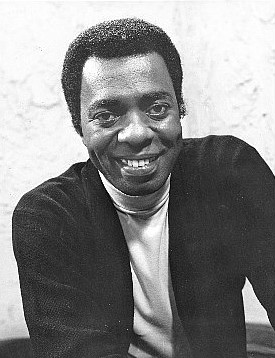
- Kilpatrick in 1968
- Born: February 12, 1931; St. Louis, Missouri, U.S.
- Died: May 18, 2004 (aged 73); Los Angeles, California, U.S.
- Occupations: Film, television actor
- Years active: 1958–2002
- Spouse: Helen Ferguson Kilpatrick (m. 1957)
- Children: 5, including Erik Kilpatrick and Lincoln Kilpatrick Jr.

Lincoln Kilpatrick (February 12, 1931 – May 18, 2004) was an American film, television, and stage actor.

== Biography ==
=== Career ===
Born in St. Louis, Missouri, Kilpatrick attended Lincoln University and earned a degree in drama before he began acting. Encouraged by Billie Holiday, Kilpatrick began his career in 1958 in the Broadway production of A Raisin in the Sun. In the 1960s, he mainly guest-starred in television roles and bit parts in movies. His primary acting talents were showcased in stage and theater work, which he remained active in until his death. Kilpatrick was co-founder of the Kilpatrick-Cambridge Theatre Arts School in Hollywood, California. He was also the first African-American member of the Lincoln Center Repertory Company.

=== Personal life and death ===
Kilpatrick was married 47 years to the singer and stage performer Helena Ferguson from 1957 until his death from lung cancer in 2004. Kilpatrick had five children: actor and composer Lincoln Kilpatrick Jr.; writer, director and actor DaCarla Kilpatrick; actor and director Erik Kilpatrick; actor Jozella Reed; and producer Marjorie L. Kilpatrick. He was buried at the Forest Lawn, Hollywood Hills Cemetery in Los Angeles.

== Filmography ==
Film
Year	Title	Role	Notes
1958	Cop Hater	Detective Dave Foster	
1968	Madigan	Patrolman Grimes	
1968	A Lovely Way to Die	Daley	Alternative title: A Lovely Way to Go
1968	What's So Bad About Feeling Good?	Wilson	Uncredited
1969	The Lost Man	Minister	
1969	Stiletto	Hannibal Smith	
1969	Generation	Hey Hey	Alternative titles: A Time for Giving and A Time for Caring
1970	The Curious Female	Uncle Charlie	Alternative title: Curious Females
1970	The Red, White, and Black	Sgt. Hatch	Alternative titles: Black Cavalry, Buffalo Soldiers, and Soul Soldiers
1971	Brother John	Charley Gray	
1971	The Omega Man	Zachary	
1971	Honky	Fabulous Traveling Shoes	
1972	Cool Breeze	Lt. Brian Knowles	
1973	Soylent Green	Father Paul	
1974	Chosen Survivors	Woody Russo	
1974	Uptown Saturday Night	Slim's Henchman #1	
1974	Together Brothers	Billy Most	First portrayal of a transgender African American in a feature film
1975	The Master Gunfighter	Jacques	
1983	Deadly Force	Otto Hoxley	
1987	Flicks	Walt	Alternative titles: Hollyweird and Loose Joints; segment: 'New Adventures of the Great Galaxy'
1987	Hollywood Cop	Jaguar	
1987	Prison	Cresus	
1988	Bulletproof	Captain Briggs	
1993	Fortress	Abraham	
1995	Piranha	Father	
2002	The Stoneman	Sgt. Wykorski	(final film role)
Television
Year	Title	Role	Notes
1962–1963	Naked City	Cappy Fleers; George - Bailiff	2 episodes
1963	The Nurses	Will	1 episode
1965	Bob Hope Presents the Chrysler Theatre		1 episode
1969	The Leslie Uggams Show		Unknown episodes
1969	The Bold Ones: The Lawyers	Clellan	Episode: "The People Against Ortega"
1969	Then Came Bronson	Leuty Giles	1 episode
1969–1972	Medical Center	Jolly; Sargent	2 episodes
1970	The Mask of Sheba	Ben Takahene	Television movie
1970–1972	Ironside	Tom Reinike; Maurice	2 episodes
1970–1972	The Bold Ones: The New Doctors	Gil Dodds; Maurice	2 episodes
1971	The Bold Ones: The Senator	Isaac Johnson	Episode: "A Single Blow of the Sword"
1971	Bearcats!	Jake	1 episode
1972	McCloud	Calvin Jones	1 episode
1974	Police Story	Sergeant Bruckner	1 episode
1974	Mannix	Lonnie	1 episode
1975	Harry O	Nat Collins	1 episode
1975	Baretta	Jefferson Hayes	1 episode
1976	Just an Old Sweet Song	Joe Mayfield	Television movie
1976	Arthur Hailey's the Moneychangers	Deacon Euphrates	Miniseries
1977	Tales of the Unexpected		1 episode
1977	Hunter	Jackson	2 episodes
1978	Kojak	Flynn	1 episode
1978	King	Jerry Waring	Miniseries
1978	Dr. Scorpion	Eddie	Television movie
1978	The White Shadow	Reverend Jackson	1 episode, uncredited
1980	Buck Rogers in the 25th Century	Dr. Ecbar	Episode: "Space Vampire"
1980	The Jeffersons	Doctor	Episode: "The Jeffersons Go to Hawaii (Part 1)"
1982	The Greatest American Hero	Le Masters	1 episode
1983	Hill Street Blues	Hawkins Sr	Episode: "Moon Over Uranus: The Final Legacy"
1983–1985	Matt Houston	Lt. Michael Hoyt	44 episodes
1984	Trapper John, M.D.		1 episode
1987	Frank's Place	Reverend Deal	1 episode
1988	227	Mr. DeWitt	Episode: "The Whiz"
1989	Amen	Walter Newton	1 episode
1990	Gabriel's Fire	Ted Duke	3 episodes
1991	Tagget	Loman	Television movie
1991	Chance of a Lifetime		Television movie
1993	Doogie Howser, M.D.	Judge	Episode: "Eleven Angry People... and Vinnie"
1994	Frasier	Artie	Episode: "Burying a Grudge"
1995	Martin	John Pittman	Episode: "'Xpress Yourself"
1995	Melrose Place	Public Defender	Episode: "Framing of the Shrews"
1995	Piranha	Father	Television movie
1996	Sisters	Eli Hayes	1 episode
1998	NYPD Blue	Darwin	Episode: "Honeymoon at Viagra Falls"
2000	ER	Chet Fulton	Episode: "Loose Ends"
