= Stranger at My Door =

Stranger at My Door may refer to:

- Stranger at My Door (1956 film), an American Western film
- Stranger at My Door (1991 film), an American made-for-television thriller drama film
