= Peter S. Fischer =

American television writer and producer (1935–2023)

- Born: Peter Steven Fischer; August 10, 1935; Queens, New York City, U.S.
- Died: October 30, 2023 (aged 88); Pacific Grove, California, U.S.
- Education: Hofstra University
- Occupations: Writer; producer
- Years active: 1971–1996; 2009–2019
- Spouse: Lucille Warnock (m. 1957; died 2017)
- Children: 3

Peter Steven Fischer (August 10, 1935 – October 30, 2023) was an American television writer, producer, and novelist. He was best known for the series Murder, She Wrote, which he co-created with Richard Levinson and William Link.

== Early life ==
Fischer was born in Queens on August 10, 1935, and took an interest in writing as a child. He graduated from Hofstra University in 1956. Fischer held a series of jobs for the next several years, including editing trade publications and working in direct mail. During this time, he was a resident of Smithtown, New York. However, he sold the script The Last Child when he was 35 years old, and it was produced as a made-for-TV film. He decided to pursue screenwriting as a career, and relocated to Los Angeles.

== Writing career ==
=== Television ===
Fischer wrote for the television series Baretta and Kojak. He created, produced and wrote for the NBC series The Eddie Capra Mysteries. He was also a story editor on Columbo.

Fischer was the executive producer of Murder, She Wrote for the first seven seasons from, 1984 to 1991. He wrote 8 of the 22 episodes the first season, and wrote or co-wrote nearly three dozen episodes of the show during its run. He said the series was conceived with the idea to create a character that combined the fictional detective Miss Marple with her creator, Agatha Christie. He later wrote the television films Stranger at My Door (1991) and Dead Man's Island (1996), which was his last credit in television.

In 2013, Fisher published a memoir, Me and Murder, She Wrote, detailing his storied career working in television.

=== Novels ===
After more than a decade in retirement, Fischer began a new career in his seventies as a novelist. He wrote more than 20 novels in the Hollywood Murder Mysteries series, set during the Golden Age of Hollywood.

== Personal life and death ==
In 1957, Fischer married Lucille Warnock. They had three children and were married until her death in 2017.

Fischer lived in Pacific Grove, California, in his later years, and died at a care home there on October 30, 2023, at the age of 88.

== Filmography ==
=== Films ===
Year	Film	Credit	Notes
1971	The Last Child	Written By	
1975	A Cry for Help	Written By	
1977	Charlie Cobb: Nice Night for a Hanging	Story By, Screenplay By, Produced By	Co-Wrote Story with "Richard Levinson" and "William Link"
1979	Donovan's Kid	Story By	
1981	Hellinger's Law	Story By, Screenplay By	Co-Wrote screenplay with "Ted Leighton" and "Jack Laird"
1991	Tagget	Screenplay By	Co-Wrote screenplay with "Janis Diamond" and "Richard T. Heffron"
1991	Stranger at My Door	Written By	
1992	Coopersmith	Written By	
1995	Cops n Roberts	Written By, Executive Producer	
1996	Dead Man's Island	Screenplay By	Based on the novel of the same name by "Carolyn Hart"

=== Television ===
Year	TV Series	Credit	Notes
1972–1973	Marcus Welby, M.D.	Writer	3 Episodes
1972–1973	Owen Marshall, Counselor at Law	Writer	2 Episodes
1973–1974	Griff	Writer	3 Episodes
1974–1975	McMillan & Wife	Writer	3 Episodes
1974–1995	Columbo	Writer, Executive Producer, Executive Story Consultant	Multiple Episodes
1975	Baretta	Writer	1 Episode
1975	Kojak	Writer	1 Episode
1975–1976	Ellery Queen	Writer, Producer	22 Episodes
1976	Delvecchio	Writer	1 Episode
1976	Once an Eagle	Writer, Producer	4 Episodes
1977–1978	What Really Happened to the Class of '65?	Writer	2 Episodes
1978	Black Beauty	Writer, Executive Producer	
1978	Richie Brockelman, Private Eye	Writer, Producer	5 Episodes
1978–1979	The Eddie Capra Mysteries	Writer, Creator, Producer, Executive Producer	12 Episodes
1979	The Magical World of Disney	Writer	2 Episodes
1981–1982	Darkroom	Writer, Executive Producer	
1984–1996	Murder, She Wrote	Writer, Creator, Executive Producer	Multiple Episodes
1986	Blacke's Magic	Writer, Executive Producer	14 Episodes
1987–1988	The Law & Harry McGraw	Writer, Creator, Executive Producer	

== Bibliography ==
=== Novels ===
==== The Hollywood Murder Mysteries ====
- Jezebel in Blue Satin (2010)
- We Don't Need no Stinking Badges (2011)
- Love Has Nothing to Do with It (2011)
- Everybody Wants an Oscar (2012)
- The Unkindness of Strangers (2012)
- Nice Guys Finish Dead (2013)
- Pray for Us Sinners (2013)
- Has Anybody Here Seen Wyckham? (2013)
- Eyewitness to Murder (2014)
- A Deadly Shoot in Texas (2016)
- Everybody Let's Rock (2016)
- A Touch of Homicide (2016)
- Some Like Em Dead (2016)
- Dead Men Pay No Debts (2016)
- Apple Annie and the Dude (2017)
- Till Death Us Do Part (2017)
- Cue the Crows (2017)
- Murder Aboard the Highland Rose (2018)
- Ashes to Ashes (2018)
- The Case of the Shaggy Stalker (2018)
- Warner's Last Stand (2018)
- The Man in the Raincoat (2019)

==== Other novels ====
- The Blood of Tyrants (2009)
- The Terror of Tyrants (2010)
- Expendable: A Tale of Love and War (2015)

=== Non-fiction ===
- Me and Murder, She Wrote (2013)
