= Paul Michael Glaser =

American actor and director (born 1943)

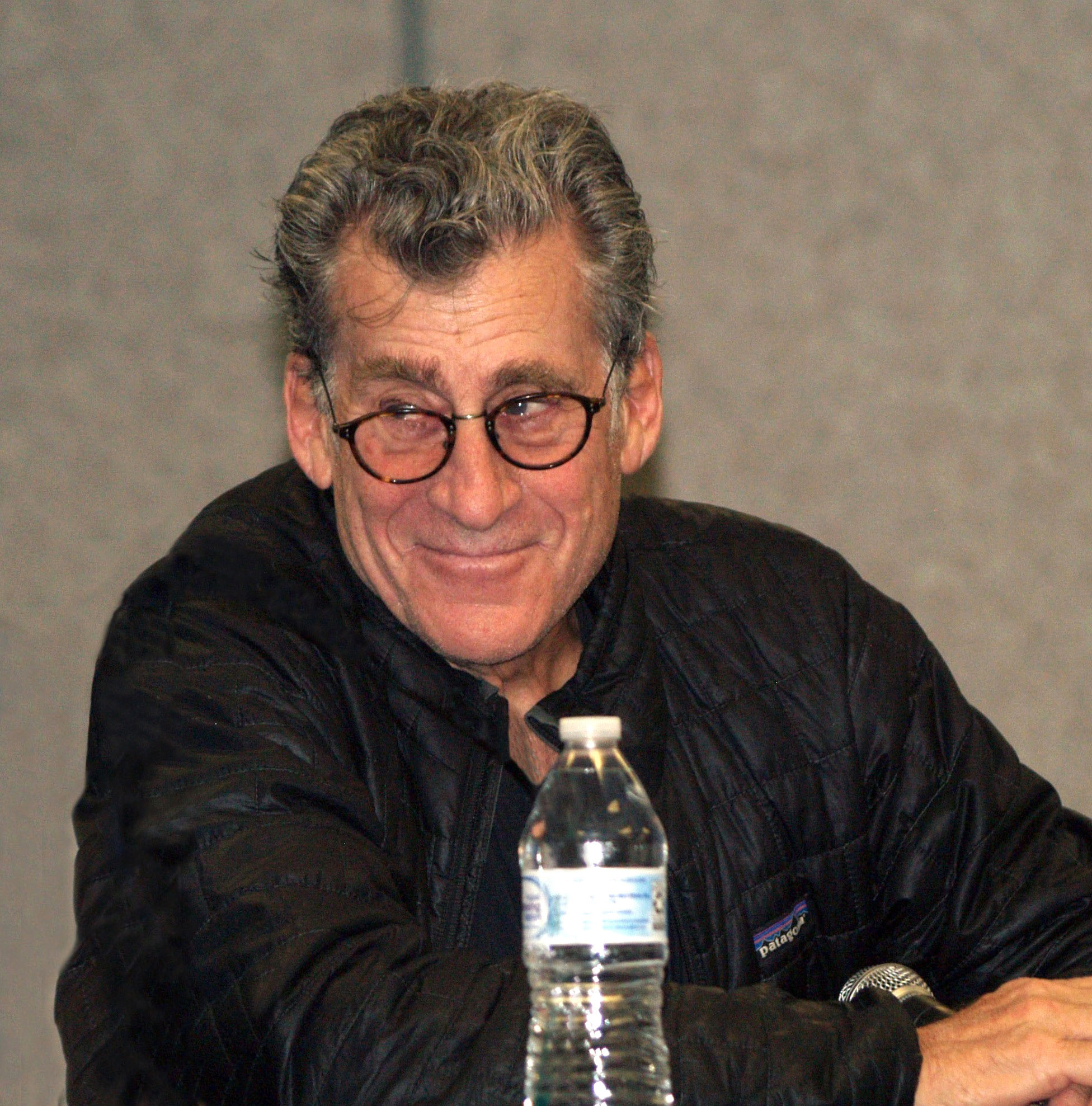
- Glaser at the 2018 East Coast Comicon in Secaucus, New Jersey
- Born: Paul Manfred Glaser; March 25, 1943 (age 83); Cambridge, Massachusetts, U.S.
- Other names: Paul M. Glaser; Paul Glaser; Michael Glaser; Mike Glaser; P.M. Glaser
- Education: Tulane University (BA); Boston University (MFA)
- Years active: 1966–present
- Known for: Detective Dave Michael Starsky – Starsky & Hutch
- Spouses: Elizabeth Glaser (m. 1980; died 1994) Tracy Barone (m. 1996; div. 2007)
- Children: 3

Paul Michael Glaser (born Paul Manfred Glaser; March 25, 1943) is an American actor, director, and writer whose career has spanned five decades. He made his acting debut in the television series Love Is a Many Splendored Thing and went on to have many acting roles, appearing in The Waltons, The Streets of San Francisco, and Kojak. Glaser rose to prominence for his portrayal as Detective Dave Starsky in the 1970s television series Starsky & Hutch and went on to write and direct five episodes for the show. Following the show's success, he ventured into directing for other series including Miami Vice, Judging Amy, and Las Vegas.

Glaser also had some success in movies. He made his acting film debut in the musical film Fiddler on the Roof and acted in the box office hit Something's Gotta Give. He also directed the cult classic film The Cutting Edge and the moderately successful box office film The Running Man. In the early 2000s, he played Captain Jack Steeper on the NBC series Third Watch from 2004 to 2005, appeared in several episodes of Ray Donovan during the 2010s, and had minor roles in Criminal Minds and The Mentalist. Glaser had his first U.S. exhibition of his art work in 2018.

== Early life ==
Paul Manfred Glaser was born March 25, 1943, in Cambridge, Massachusetts, the youngest child and only son of Jewish parents Dorothy and Samuel Glaser, an MIT graduate and well-known Boston architect. He grew up in Brookline and Newton. Although his family did not observe Shabbat, they did celebrate Judaism's major holidays, including Glaser's own bar mitzvah. Samuel designed a shul in Rhode Island.

Glaser attended the Buckingham Browne & Nichols School until 1961 before transferring to the Cambridge School of Weston, completing high school. He attended Tulane University, where he was roommates with film director Bruce Paltrow, majoring in theater and English with a minor in architecture, and graduating in 1966. He was a member of the Sigma Alpha Mu fraternity. He earned a master's degree in fine arts from Boston University in acting and directing in 1967.

== Career ==
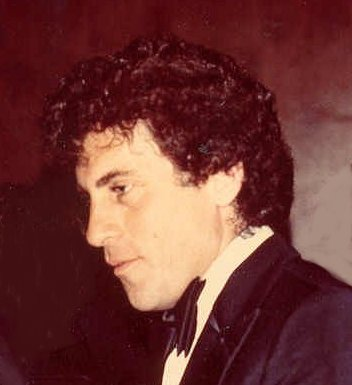
Glaser at the F.I.S.T. premiere in 1978.

Glaser made his movie debut as Perchick in the 1971 movie version of the musical Fiddler on the Roof. He found fame playing Detective Dave Starsky opposite David Soul in the television series Starsky & Hutch, of which he directed several episodes. It ran for four seasons (1975–1979) on ABC.

After that series, Glaser continued to act on television and in movies, and directed the 1987 film The Running Man starring Arnold Schwarzenegger as well as the 1992 movie The Cutting Edge. He also directed episodes of several TV series, including Miami Vice, Robbery Homicide Division and Judging Amy. Glaser returned to the big screen in 2003 in Something's Gotta Give, as Diane Keaton's ex-husband, and with a brief cameo in the 2004 film version of Starsky & Hutch, in which Starsky was played by Ben Stiller. He directed the children's movie Kazaam featuring Shaquille O'Neal. He guest featured in "The Scarlet Letter", the October 1, 2009, episode of CBS's The Mentalist.

Between 2013 and 2019, Glaser appeared as Alan in several episodes of the television series Ray Donovan. In an interview published in April 2018, Glaser, having not acted since that role was asked if he had retired from acting, and replied, "People ask me, 'What's your favorite: acting, directing or writing?' My answer: What life occurs. It's what happens. You never know when something will cross your path. I try to stay open to everything. I'm doing a guest appearance on Grace and Frankie right now. As long as it's a good group of people, I'm open to anything. That's the thing I enjoy most about filmmaking or acting: experience." That same month, Glaser had his first American solo exhibition for his paintings and digital illustrations at Cosmo Lofts in Hollywood. The show was titled "Act III", because his foray as an artist marked the third stage of his career, following acting in front of the camera, and writing/directing behind it.

== Personal life ==
Glaser has been married twice. He married his first wife, Elizabeth Glaser, in 1980. In August 1981, she contracted HIV through a blood transfusion while giving birth to the couple's first child, Ariel. Elizabeth did not know that she was infected with the virus until four years later, when both she and Ariel became sick with a mysterious illness. When the entire family was tested, Elizabeth, Ariel and the couple's one-and-a-half-year-old son Jake were found to be HIV positive. Ariel died three years later, soon after her seventh birthday. Elizabeth died on December 3, 1994.

Glaser later married Tracy Barone, who adopted Jake, who was 10 years old at the time. The couple had a daughter, Zoe. That marriage ended with Glaser filing for divorce in June 2007.

As of 2007, Jake remained healthy, and as of 2016, had maintained his relationship with Tracy.

== Filmography ==
=== Film ===
Director

- Band of the Hand (1986)
- The Running Man (1987)
- The Cutting Edge (1992)
- The Air Up There (1994)
- Kazaam (1996) (Also producer and story writer)

Actor

Year	Title	Role
1971	Fiddler on the Roof	Perchik
1972	Butterflies Are Free	Ralph
1974	Aces Up	Mover
1974	Trapped Beneath the Sea	Jack Beech
1976	The Great Houdini	Harry Houdini (Erik Weisz)
1980	Phobia	Dr. Peter Ross
1983	Wait till Your Mother Gets Home!	Coach Bob Peters
1983	Princess Daisy	Fred North
1984	Single Bars, Single Women	Gabe
1984	Jealousy	Daniel
1984	Attack on Fear	Dave Mitchell
2003	Something's Gotta Give	Dave Klein
2004	Starsky & Hutch	Original David Starsky
2007	Live!	Network President
2010	Lego: The Adventures of Clutch Powers	Kjeld Playwell (voice)

=== Television ===
Director

Year	Title	Episode(s)
1973	The Waltons	"The Air Mail Man"
1975–1979	Starsky & Hutch	"Bloodbath"
1975–1979	Starsky & Hutch	"Class in Crime"
1975–1979	Starsky & Hutch	"Deckwatch"
1975–1979	Starsky & Hutch	"Ballad for a Blue Lady" (Also writer)
1975–1979	Starsky & Hutch	"Sweet Revenge"
1984–1985	Miami Vice	"Calderone's Return: Calderone's Demise"
1984–1985	Miami Vice	"Smuggler's Blues"
1984–1985	Miami Vice	"The Prodigal Son"
1985	Otherworld	"Village of the Motorpigs"
1987	Amazing Stories	"Blue Man Down"
2001-2003	Judging Amy	"Look Closer"
2001-2003	Judging Amy	"Going Down"
2002	The Agency	Episode "Son Set"
2002	The Agency	"The Golden Hour"
2002	The Agency	"Doublecrossover"
2002	The Agency	"Elite Meat to Eat"
2002	The Agency	"Debbie Does Djakarta"
2002–2003	Robbery Homicide Division	"In/Famous"
2002–2003	Robbery Homicide Division	"Had"
2002–2003	Robbery Homicide Division	"Absolute Perfection"
2003	Mister Sterling	"Final Passage"
2004–2005	Third Watch	"Alone Again, Naturally"
2004–2005	Third Watch	"Welcome Home"
2005–2008	Las Vegas	"To Protect and Serve Manicotti"
2005–2008	Las Vegas	"Double Down
2005–2008	Las Vegas	Triple Threat"
2005–2008	Las Vegas	"For Sail by Owner"
2005–2008	Las Vegas	"Wines and Misdemeanors"
2005–2008	Las Vegas	"Adventures in the Skin Trade"
2006	E-Ring	"Brothers in Arms"
2007	Raines	"5th Step"
2008	Criminal Minds	"Masterpiece"

TV movie

- Amazons (1984)

Actor

Year	Title	Role	Episode(s)
1970–1973	Love Is a Many Splendored Thing	Dr. Peter Chernak	
1972	The Streets of San Francisco	Jason Kampacalas	"Bitter Wine"
1972	Cannon	Jason Logan	"Nobody Beats the House" (credited as "Michael Glaser")
1973	The Waltons	Todd Cooper	"The Air Mail Man"
1974	The Rockford Files	Ralph Correll	"Find Me If You Can"
1974	Kojak	Lou Giordino	"Down a Long and Lonely River"
1975–1979	Starsky & Hutch	Detective David Starsky	92 episodes
2001	And Never Let Her Go	Det Frank Gugliatta	
2004–2005	Third Watch	Captain Jack Steeper	"Sleeping Dogs Lie", "Blessed and Bewildered", "No More, Forever"
2008	The Closer	Davis Mayhan	"Speed Bump"
2008	Criminal Minds	Detective Garrity	"Masterpiece"
2008	Numbers	Brett Hanson	"Conspiracy Theory"
2009	The Mentalist	Walter Crew	"The Scarlet Letter"
2013	Ray Donovan	Alan	"Black Cadillac"
2019	Grace and Frankie	Leo	Season 5
