= Lincoln Kilpatrick Jr. =

American actor

- Born: October 4, 1961 (age 65); North Hollywood, California, U.S.
- Occupation: Actor
- Years active: 1971–1977
- Father: Lincoln Kilpatrick
- Relatives: Erik Kilpatrick (brother)

Lincoln Kilpatrick Jr. (born October 4, 1961) is a former child star and American actor during the 1970s.

== Biography ==
=== Early life ===
Kilpatrick was born on October 4, 1961, in North Hollywood, California. He was born the eldest of five children born to actor Lincoln Kilpatrick and former performer Helena Ferguson.

=== Career ===
Kilpatrick appeared in his first film and began his career at the age of 10 in the movie Dead Men Tell No Tales in 1971 as the role of Mike Carter. Kilpatrick also played the minor role of Jeff in the 1977 TV movie Alexander: The Other Side of Dawn.

Kilpatrick made his first television appearance on the March 9, 1973, episode of the NBC sitcom Sanford and Son. Kilpatrick also made a television appearance on the CBS sitcom Good Times in the episode Michael, the Warlord as Ratbone, the leader of the "Junior Warlords" street gang Michael has been bullied into. The episode aired on October 13, 1976.

=== Family ===
Kilpatrick is the son of longtime film and television actor Lincoln Kilpatrick and performer Helena Ferguson. He is also the nephew of actor John Kilpatrick. Kilpatrick is also the brother of actress DaCarla Kilpatrick, actor/director Erik Kilpatrick, actress Jozella Reed, and producer Marjorie L. Reed.

== Filmography ==
- Dead Men Tell No Tales (Mike Carter) (1971)
- Sanford and Son (Jason) (Episode: "The Kid" air date - March 9, 1973)
- Good Times (Ratbone) (Episode: "Michael, the Warlord")
- Alexander: The Other Side of Dawn (Jeff) (1977)
