= The Law & Harry McGraw =

American mystery crime drama television series

- Genre: Crime drama; Police procedural; Mystery
- Created by: Peter S. Fischer
- Starring: Jerry Orbach; Barbara Babcock
- Composer: Richard Markowitz
- Country of origin: United States
- Original language: English
- No. of seasons: 1
- No. of episodes: 16

Production
- Executive producer: Peter S. Fischer
- Producer: Tom Sawyer
- Running time: 60 minutes
- Production company: Universal Television

Original release
- Network: CBS
- Release: September 27, 1987 – February 10, 1988

Related
- Murder, She Wrote

The Law & Harry McGraw is an American mystery crime drama television series created by Peter S. Fischer and a spin-off of Murder, She Wrote that aired on CBS from September 27, 1987, to February 10, 1988.

Harry McGraw had been a recurring character in Murder, She Wrote, having appeared in six episodes, beginning with "Tough Guys Don't Die" (season 1, episode 16).

== Plot ==
The series stars Jerry Orbach as a loudmouthed, uncouth, old school private detective who continually finds himself solving mysteries on behalf of the prim and proper defense attorney Ellie Maginnis (played by Barbara Babcock) who has an office across the hall. Maginnis finds McGraw's methods somewhat hard to digest, albeit effective, and a romantic attraction between the two is suggested although the series didn't last long enough for such a subplot to fully develop.

== Cast ==
- Jerry Orbach as Harry McGraw
- Barbara Babcock as Ellie Maginnis
- Earl Boen as Howard
- Juliana Donald as E.J. Brunson
- Shea Farrell as Steve Lacey
- Marty Davis as Cookie
- Peter Haskell as Tyler Chase

== Episodes ==
No.	Title	Directed by	Written by	Original release date	Viewers (millions)
1	"Dead Men Don't Make Phone Calls"	Peter Crane	Peter S. Fischer	September 27, 1987	15.20
2	"Murder by Landslide"	Peter Crane	Peter S. Fischer	October 6, 1987	9.4 rating
3	"Mr. Chapman, I Presume?"	Sigmund Neufeld Jr.	Steven Long Mitchell & Craig W. Van Sickle	October 13, 1987	15.40
4	"The Fallen Arrow"	Allen Reisner	Robert E. Swanson	October 20, 1987	14.80
5	"Rapaport's Back in Town"	Jackie Cooper	Peter S. Fischer	October 27, 1987	12.70
6	"She's Not Wild About Harry"	Seymour Robbie	Janice Fishman	November 3, 1987	13.30
7	"Angela's Secret"	Nick Havinga	Arthur David Weingarten	November 10, 1987	15.40
8	"Solve It Again, Harry"	Jackie Cooper	Marvin Kupfer & Peter S. Fischer	November 17, 1987	12.40
9	"State of the Art"	Allen Reisner	Tom Sawyer	November 24, 1987	13.00
10	"Yankee Boodle Dandy"	Seymour Robbie	Tom Sawyer	December 1, 1987	17.40
11	"Old Heroes Never Lie"	Walter Grauman	Walter Brough	December 8, 1987	13.40
12	"Gilhooley's is History"	Sigmund Neufeld Jr.	Story by : Joe Goldberg; Teleplay by : Richard Stanley & Ralph Meyering Jr.	January 13, 1988	12.50
13	"Beware the Ides of May"	Seymour Robbie	Peter S. Fischer	January 20, 1988	12.90
14	"Waiting Game"	Allen Reisner	Peter S. Fischer	January 27, 1988	12.30
15	"Harry Does the Hustle"	John Llewellyn Moxey	Peter S. Fischer	February 3, 1988	13.10
16	"Maginnis for the People"	Allen Reisner	Peter S. Fischer	February 10, 1988	11.10

== Cancellation ==
After the show's fast cancellation (it lasted a little more than a half-season), Orbach reprised the role of Harry McGraw in a few episodes of Murder, She Wrote before a few years later moving on to play NYPD Senior detective Lennie Briscoe on fellow Universal Television series Law & Order.

== Home media ==
The complete series was released in Australia by Madman Entertainment in 2012 as a 5-Disc (PAL Format) box set for region 4.
