= Erik Kilpatrick =

American actor

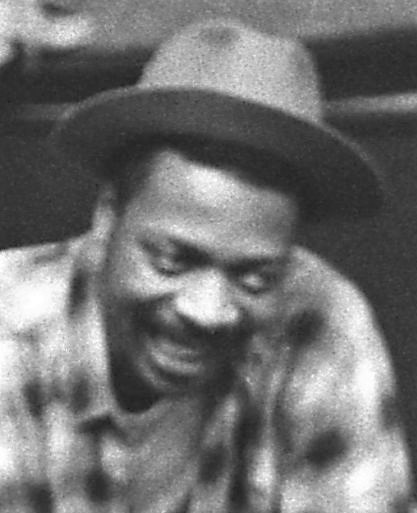
- Kilpatrick in 1986
- Occupation: Television actor
- Family: Lincoln Kilpatrick (father); Lincoln Kilpatrick Jr. (brother)

Erik Kilpatrick (born 1952) is an American actor who is best known for playing Curtis Jackson on the CBS television series The White Shadow. He is the son of Lincoln Kilpatrick. Erik and his father co-starred in "Here's Mud in Your Eye", an episode from the first season of The White Shadow. Kilpatrick has a younger brother, Lincoln Kilpatrick Jr., and a sister, DaCarla Kilpatrick, who also are actors. Kilpatrick is the father of Erika Kurzawa and Toussaint Kilpatrick. Married to Chris Anthony. Today, Kilpatrick devotes much of his time directing and is the founder and Artistic Director of KOLA Theatre.
