= A Cry for Help (1975 film) =

- Genre: Drama
- Written by: Peter S. Fischer
- Directed by: Daryl Duke
- Starring: Robert Culp; Elayne Heilveil; Ken Swofford; Julius Harris
- Music by: Gil Mellé
- Country of origin: United States
- Original language: English

Production
- Executive producers: Richard Levinson; William Link
- Producer: Howie Horwitz
- Cinematography: Richard C. Glouner
- Editors: Frank Morriss; Douglas Stewart
- Running time: 73 minutes
- Production company: Universal Television

Original release
- Network: ABC
- Release: February 12, 1975

A Cry for Help is a 1975 American made-for-television drama film directed by Daryl Duke and written by Peter S. Fischer. The film starred Robert Culp as an abusive radio talk-show host and premiered as the ABC Movie of the Week on February 12, 1975.

== Plot ==
Harry Freeman is a radio talk-show host who abuses those who call in, but changes his behavior when he receives a call from a suicidal teenage girl. He asks his listeners for help in finding her by soliciting information about her description and possible location.

== Cast ==
- Robert Culp as Harry Freeman
- Elayne Heilveil as Ingrid Brunner
- Ken Swofford as Paul Church
- Julius Harris as George Rigney
- Chuck McCann as Buddy Marino
- Michael Lerner as Phillip Conover
- Bruce Boxleitner as Richie Danko

== Reception ==
Synopsis from Modcinema:

A Cry for Help (working title: End of the Line) stars Robert Culp as an acerbic, Don Imus-like radio talk show host. When one of his callers, an anxious young woman, threatens to kill herself, Culp laughs it off. Later, however, he realizes that the girl wasn't kidding, and mounts a frantic effort-with the help of his loyal audience-to locate the would-be suicide. Richard Levinson and William Link's script stretches the tension level to the snapping point, and you'll love every minute of it.
