= Point Reyes Light (newspaper) =

Newspaper in Point Reyes Station, California

- Type: Weekly newspaper
- Format: Tabloid
- Owner(s): Tess Elliott; David Briggs
- Founder(s): Dave and Wilma Rogers
- Founded: 1948 (as The Baywood Press)
- Language: English
- Headquarters: Point Reyes Station, CA 94956; United States
- Sister newspapers: North Coaster
- Website: ptreyeslight.com

The Point Reyes Light is a weekly newspaper published since 1948 in western Marin County, California. The Light won a Pulitzer Prize in 1979 for its reporting on the cult Synanon. The paper is owned by Tess Elliott and David Briggs.

The Light covers regional issues in and near West Marin, including the communities of Point Reyes Station, Inverness, Olema, Bolinas, Inverness Park, Nicasio, Stinson Beach, the San Geronimo Valley, Tomales, and the nearby Point Reyes National Seashore, as well as Fairfax and Bodega Bay.

== History ==
=== Early years ===
On March 1, 1948, Dave L. and Wilma S. Rogers published the first edition of The Baywood Press in Inverness, California. Mrs. Rogers served as editor while her husband worked as business manager. The paper was soon relocated to Point Reyes Station, California. The Press was acquired by Allan C. and Madonna Bartlett in 1951, George and Nancy Sherman in 1956, and Don and Clara Mae DeWolfe in 1957.

The newspaper was renamed to the Point Reyes Light on Sept. 8, 1966, in order to better inform advertising agencies and law enforcement where the publication was based. The name Light is a reference to the Point Reyes Lighthouse. After 13 years of ownership, the DeWolfes sold the Light in 1970 to Michael D. and Annabelle Gahagan. In 1975, David V. Mitchell and his wife Catherine "Cathy" Mitchell bought the Light from the Gahagans. The sale price was $47,000 when its circulation was 1,700.

=== Pulitzer Prize ===
In 1979, the Light won the Pulitzer Prize for Public Service for a six month investigation into Synanon, a drug rehab program turned cult. Mitchell uncovered evidence of alleged beatings, hoarding of weapons and revenge attacks and published seven news articles and 13 editorials on the group. The Light was the first weekly in 26 years to win the award, and the forth weekly ever. The Mitchells, both age 35 at the time, garnered requests for speeches and television appearances for their win.

The Mitchells and UC Berkeley sociologist Richard Ofshe wrote a book on Synanon called The Light on Synanon: How a Country Weekly Exposed a Corporate Cult and Won the Pulitzer Prize. It was published by Seaview Books in 1980, and was turned into a two-hour movie for CBS titled Attack on Fear in 1984.

Synanon sued Reader's Digest for an article they published on the Mitchells and their Pulitzer Prize win. In 1984, the California Supreme Court threw out the $260 million libel suit and ruled that reporters may not have to identify confidential sources in civil cases. Synanon also filed several libel and slander suits against the Mitchells and Ofshe for comments made during a KQED (TV) broadcast. The Mitchells countersued and in 1986 settled with Synanon for $100,000.

=== Post-Pulitzer ===
In 1981, the Mitchells divorced due to the financial strain of the paper. David Mitchell went to go work as reporter at the San Francisco Examiner and in May the two put The Light up for sale at $135,000. That October, William A. Remos and Rosalie W. Laird acquired the paper. Remos soon left the business. In December 1983, David Mitchell reacquired the paper from Laird.

=== Plotkin era ===
In 2005, Mitchell sold the Light to 35-year-old Robert Plotkin, an attorney and recent Columbia Journalism School graduate living in Bolinas, California. Mitchell remained on as publisher emeritus and continued to write his column "Sparsely Sage and Timely." At that time the paper's circulation was 4,000 and had lost $30,000 the year prior, but currently breaking even. Plotkin agreed to buy the paper for $500,000 and pay Mitchell $175 a week for five years of consultation. Locals criticized Plotkin for allowing less room for Letter to the editor section, publishing more national and international news, and featuring a story on an alleged rapist on the front cover of the Christmas edition. Mitchell and Plotkin soon got into a bitter public feud over management disagreements.

In February 2005, Plotkin said Mitchell attempted to strangle him and run him over with his car after getting into an argument over how to cover a local land dispute. This incident led Plotkin to petition for a temporary restraining order against Mitchell. In May 2006, the Maine Superior Court issued a three-year restraining order Mitchell barring him from contacting Plotkin or visiting the paper's office. Mitchell denied the accusation and called Plotkin a "manic-depressive" in his column, which prompted a sheriff's deputy to take Plotkin into custody for a psychiatric evaluation. The conflict between the present and former owner, along with controversy over changes to the paper, led to profiles on the Light in the San Francisco Chronicle, Los Angeles Times, The New York Times, along with a critique in the Columbia Journalism Review.

In August 2006, the court issued another injection against Mitchell, this time barring him from posting his column to the website of the Bodega Bay Navigator, a local newspaper in Sonoma County with a defunct print edition, with Plotkin arguing it being in violation of the non-compete clause in their Light sale agreement. Plotkin attempted to buy The Navigator from Joel Hack, who instead decided to close it. In June 2007, a former booker at the Light was pleaded guilty to embezzling $62,000. That same month, Hack launched a rival paper in Point Reyes Station aimed at residents dissatisfied with Plotkin. It was originally called the West Marin Pilot, but soon renamed to the West Marin Citizen. Hack employed several former Light staffers including managing editor Jim Kravets. In January 2008, Mitchell and Plotkin reached an out-of-court settlements on a pair of lawsuits and countersuits. Over the next year, income at the Light dropped by 37% amid the Great Recession. This prompted Plotkin to sell the paper. He entered into negotiations with Marinscope Community Newspapers, owner of the Novato Advance, and a locally owned limited liability company called Mount Vision Associates, which aimed to acquire both the Light and Citizen and consolidate the two, but both buyers eventually dropped out.

=== After Plotkin ===
In May 2010, Plotkin sold the Light to the nonprofit Marin Media Institute, which ran the paper as a low-profit limited liability company. The sale was financed by $350,000 in donations from 75 people, including Warren Hellman. In October 2011, Hack retired from the Citizen and turned it over to advertising director Linda Petersen. In 2015, Light editor Tess Elliott and her partner David Briggs purchased the Light in exchange for waiving $100,000 in back wages and converted it into a LLC. That same year, the couple acquired the Citizen from Petersen for $50,000 raised from donors and folded it into the Light. In 2023, former Light owner Mitchell died.

== Point Reyes Family Album ==
Art Rogers has provided photographs published in the feature "Point Reyes Family Album" since 1975. The Album's pages include portraits of babies and newlyweds, panoramic photos of multi-generation family gatherings, and then-and-now pairings showing the passage of time in local families and places. One of Rogers' 1980 photos for the Album, of a local couple holding eight puppies, was used by Jeff Koons as the basis for a sculpture called "String of Puppies," After Koons put several of the sculptures on sale at a New York gallery, Rogers sued for copyright infringement, winning at the District Court in 1990 and winning an appeal in 1992. (See Rogers v. Koons.) The case was eventually settled out of court and is frequently referred to in articles on the appropriation or "transformative reinterpretation" of one artist's work by another.
