= Something Wicked (book) =

1988 novel by Carolyn Hart

- Author: Carolyn Hart
- Genre: Mystery fiction
- Published: 1988
- Publisher: Bantam Books
- Pages: 226
- Awards: Anthony Award for Best Paperback Original (1989)
- ISBN: 978-0-553-27222-2
- Website: Something Wicked

Something Wicked is a novel written by Carolyn Hart and published by Bantam Books on 1 May 1988 which later went on to win the Anthony Award for Best Paperback Original in 1989.
