= Chosen Survivors =

1974 film by Sutton Roley

- Original poster art
- Directed by: Sutton Roley
- Screenplay by: Harry Spalding (as H.B. Cross); Joe Reb Moffly
- Story by: Harry Spalding (as H.B. Cross)
- Produced by: Leon Benson; Charles W. Fries (as Charles Fries)
- Starring: Jackie Cooper; Alex Cord; Richard Jaeckel; Bradford Dillman; Pedro Armendáriz Jr. Diana Muldaur
- Cinematography: Gabriel Torres
- Edited by: John F. Link; Dennis Virkler
- Music by: Fred Karlin
- Color process: Color
- Production companies: Metromedia Producers Corporation; Alpine Productions Inc. Estudios Churubusco Azteca S.A.
- Distributed by: Columbia Pictures
- Release date: May 24, 1974
- Running time: 99 minutes
- Countries: Mexico; United States
- Language: English

Chosen Survivors is a 1974 Mexican-American horror science fiction film directed by Sutton Roley and starring Jackie Cooper, Alex Cord, Richard Jaeckel, Bradford Dillman, Pedro Armendáriz Jr. and Diana Muldaur

== Plot ==
After being selected at random by a computer to seek safety in an underground bomb shelter on the eve of a nuclear attack, a group of refugees makes a horrible realization: They are sharing the space with a colony of vampire bats. And since going back above ground is not an option, they are forced to stay and fight for their lives.

== Cast ==
- Jackie Cooper as Raymond Couzins
- Alex Cord as Steven Mayes
- Richard Jaeckel as Major Gordon Ellis
- Bradford Dillman as Peter Macomber
- Pedro Armendáriz, Jr. as Luis Cabral (as Pedro Armendariz Jr.)
- Diana Muldaur as Alana Fitzgerald
- Lincoln Kilpatrick as Woody Russo
- Gwenn Mitchell as Carrie Draper
- Barbara Babcock as Dr. Lenore Chrisman
- Cristina Moreno as Kristin Lerner (as Christina Moteno)
- Nancy Rodman as Claire Farraday
- Kelly Lange as Mary Louise Borden

== Reception ==
The Monster Times wrote that the film "manages to overcome its only middling script and provide enough moments of hair-stiffening horror to make it worth seeing." In Detour, Mike White wrote "Instead of being a poignant post-apocalyptic character study, the movie quickly devolves into a crazed creature feature" Leslie Halliwell wrote "Another misfit group united by disaster; more shocks than suspense, and not much."

== Releases ==
The film was released theatrically in the United States on May 24, 1974. The original distributor was Columbia Pictures.

The film was released on DVD in a double feature with The Earth Dies Screaming as part of MGM's Midnite Movies series.

Most recently, film restoration company Kino Lorber released blu-ray collectors edition on October 16, 2016.

== See also ==
- List of American films of 1974
- Midnite Movies
