= Barbara Babcock =

American actress (born 1937)

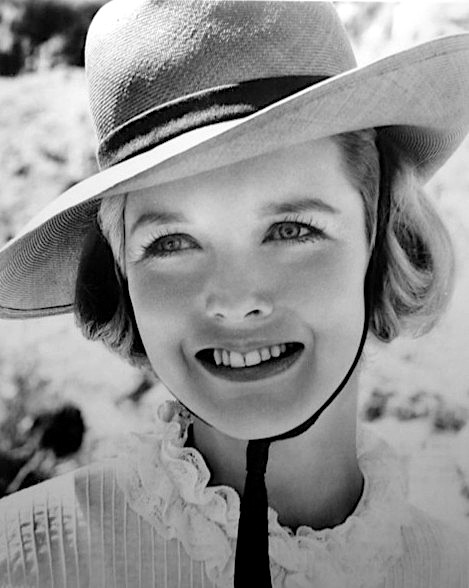
- Babcock in 1968
- Born: February 27, 1937 (age 89); Fort Riley, Kansas, US
- Education: Wellesley College; University of Lausanne; University of Milan
- Occupation: Actress
- Years active: 1956–2004
- Spouse: Jay Sheffield (1962–1968)
- Awards: Primetime Emmy Award for Outstanding Lead Actress in a Drama Series (Hill Street Blues, 1981)

Barbara Babcock (born February 27, 1937) is an American actress. She began her career on television in mid-1950s with guest-starring appearances in more than 60 television series through her career. She made several appearances on Star Trek: The Original Series, Mannix and Murder, She Wrote and had a recurring role in the CBS prime time soap opera, Dallas from 1978 to 1982.

In 1981, Babcock received the Primetime Emmy Award for Outstanding Lead Actress in a Drama Series for her role as Grace Gardner in the NBC police drama series, Hill Street Blues (1981–87). She later starred in a number of short-lived television series, most notably The Law & Harry McGraw (1987–88). From 1993 to 1998, Babcock starred as Dorothy Jennings in the CBS Western series, Dr. Quinn, Medicine Woman, for which she was nominated for a Primetime Emmy Award for Outstanding Supporting Actress in a Drama Series in 1995. Babcock also appeared in films Day of the Evil Gun (1968), Heaven with a Gun (1969), Chosen Survivors (1974), The Black Marble (1980), The Lords of Discipline (1983), Far and Away (1992) and Space Cowboys (2000).

== Early life ==
Born in Fort Riley, Kansas, Babcock spent a large part of her childhood in Tokyo, Japan, where her father, U.S. Army Gen. Conrad Stanton Babcock, Jr., was stationed. She learned to speak Japanese before English.

Babcock studied at the University of Lausanne in Switzerland and in Italy at the University of Milan. She also attended Miss Porter's School and graduated from Wellesley College, where she was a classmate of Ali MacGraw.

== Career ==
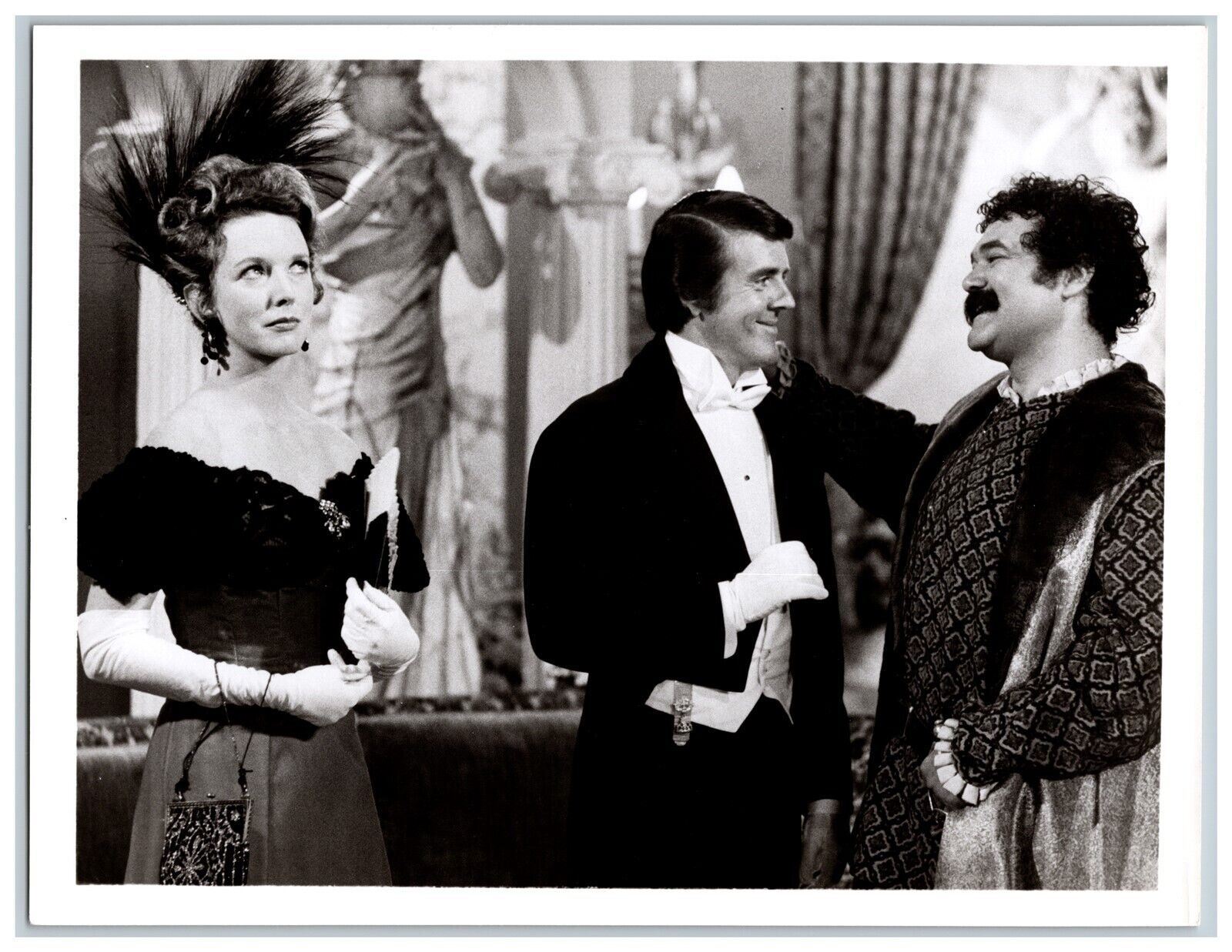
Babcock with Avery Schreiber (right) and Jack Burns in Love, American Style (1973)

Babcock made her television debut appearing in an episode of anthology series The United States Steel Hour in 1956. The following years she made many guest-starring appearances on television, notable in The Many Loves of Dobie Gillis as a cousin to the rich boy nemesis of the title character. She made appearances on The Lieutenant; The Munsters; The Green Hornet; The Lucy Show; Judd, for the Defense and Mission: Impossible. From 1967 to 1969 she appeared in several episodes of the original series of Star Trek, although much of her work on the show consisted of uncredited voice roles. She also appeared in three episodes of Hogan's Heroes from 1967 to 1970.

In 1968, Babcock made her motion picture debut in the Metro-Goldwyn-Mayer Western film Day of the Evil Gun starring Glenn Ford, followed by role in the Heaven with a Gun (1969) also with Glenn Ford. She appeared in a number of made-for-television movies and miniseries in 1970s, including The Last Child (1971), Christmas Miracle in Caufield, U.S.A. (1977), The Survival of Dana (1979) and Salem's Lot (1979). She had supporting roles in films Bang the Drum Slowly (1973), Chosen Survivors (1974), The Black Marble (1980), Back Roads (1981), The Lords of Discipline (1983), and That Was Then... This Is Now (1985), Heart of Dixie (1989) and Happy Together (1989). She also made guest appearances on The F.B.I.; Cannon; Love, American Style; Medical Center; Starsky & Hutch, The Rockford Files, Quincy, M.E. and four appearances on Mannix. She had regular role on the CBS daytime soap opera Search for Tomorrow in 1976 and from 1978 to 1982 had the recurring role of Liz Craig in the CBS prime time soap opera, Dallas.

In 1981, Babcock received critical acclaim for playing Grace Gardner in the NBC police drama series Hill Street Blues. She won the 1981 Primetime Emmy Award for Outstanding Lead Actress in a Drama Series for her work on Hill Street Blues. She appeared in 17 episodes of the series from 1981 to 1987. Babcock starred in the TV movies Quarterback Princess (1983), Attack on Fear (1984) and News at Eleven (1986). She appeared in the short-lived CBS drama series The Four Seasons in 1984, based on the 1981 film. She also starred in the short-lived sitcom Mr. Sunshine in 1986, and the detective series The Law & Harry McGraw during 1987-88. During 1980s, Babcock also guest-starred on Cheers, Hotel, Remington Steele, and starred in an episode of Alfred Hitchcock Presents — receiving the 1987 CableACE Award for Outstanding Actress in a Dramatic Series. She made five appearances on Murder, She Wrote from 1985 to 1993, and also appeared on The Golden Girls, Empty Nest, China Beach, Wings, and Sisters. She played the mother of Nicole Kidman's character in the 1992 Western film Far and Away.

From 1993 to 1998, Babcock played the role of Dorothy Jennings in the CBS Western series Dr. Quinn, Medicine Woman, for which she was nominated for an Emmy Award for Outstanding Supporting Actress in a Drama Series in 1993. (However, the Emmy Awards website lists the nomination for 1995.) She was voted one of the 50 Most Beautiful People in the World by People in 1994. She reprised her role in the 1998 made-for-television movie Dr. Quinn, Medicine Woman: The Movie. In 1999 she played the leading role in A Vow to Cherish opposite Ken Howard. In 2000, Babcock made her final big screen appearance in the science fiction film Space Cowboys with Clint Eastwood and James Garner. She also made guest appearances on The Pretender, Chicago Hope, Frasier, and Judging Amy. From 2001 to 2002, she played the role of the mother of Dana Delany's character in the Fox drama series, Pasadena. In 2002, she appeared in a made-for-television comedy Home Alone 4.

== Personal life ==
In 2004, Babcock was diagnosed with Parkinson's disease. She resides in Carmel, California.

In 1982, Babcock and actress Susan Bjurman received U.S. patent 4,344,446 for a combination solid stick scalp cleanser and hair shampoo-conditioner gel that they developed.

== Filmography ==
=== Film ===
Year	Title	Role
1968	Day of the Evil Gun	Angie Warfield
1969	Heaven with a Gun	Mrs. Andrews
1971	The Last Child	Shelley Drumm
1973	Bang the Drum Slowly	Team Owner
1974	Chosen Survivors	Dr. Lenore Chrisman
1977	Christmas Miracle in Caufield, U.S.A.	Rachel Sullivan
1978	Operating Room	Jean Lawrence
1979	Survival of Dana	Lorna Sims
1980	The Black Marble	Madeline Whitfield
1981	Back Roads	Rickey's Mom
1982	Memories Never Die	Louise Lowry
1983	Quarterback Princess	Judy Maida
1983	The Lords of Discipline	Abigail St. Croix
1984	Attack on Fear	Jane Dutton
1985	That Was Then... This Is Now	Mrs. Douglas
1986	News at Eleven	Joanna Steckler
1989	Happy Together	Ruth Carpenter
1989	Heart of Dixie	Coralee Claibourne
1990	A Family for Joe	Miss Quinn Collins
1992	Far and Away	Nora Christie
1993	Fugitive Nights: Danger in the Desert	Rhonda Devon
1996	A Mother's Instinct	Mrs. Mitchell
1997	Childhood Sweetheart?	Rose Carlson
1999	A Vow to Cherish	Ellen Brighton
1999	Dr. Quinn, Medicine Woman: The Movie	Dorothy Jennings
2000	Space Cowboys	Barbara Corvin
2002	Home Alone 4	Molly

=== Television ===
Year	Title	Role	Notes
1961	NBC Sunday Showcase	Annie Lee	1 episode
1963	The Many Loves of Dobie Gillis	Pamela Osborne	1 episode
1963	Combat!	Bar Patron At The Savoy	Uncredited
1965	The Munsters	Miss Guthrie	1 episode
1966–1967	The Green Hornet	Elaine Carey	2 episodes
1967	The Lucy Show	English Teacher	1 episode
1968	Mission: Impossible	Major Maria Felder	1 episode
1967–1968	Star Trek	Mea 3 / Philana / Voice-Over Work	"A Taste of Armageddon" and S3:E10, "Plato's Stepchildren", plus 5 other episodes
1969	Family Affair	Pamela	1 episode
1967–1970	Hogan's Heroes	Mama Bear / Maria Schmidt	3 episodes
1971	Night Gallery	Flora Alden	1 episode
1972	The F.B.I.	Mary Hale	1 episode
1972	Banyon	Caroline Wheeler	1 episode
1968–1973	Mannix	Ellen West	4 episodes
1973	Cannon	Ruth Gardner	The Good Samaritan
1973	Love, American Style	Anna Scott	1 episode
	Shaft	Jane Cunningham	1 episode
1975	The Streets of San Francisco	Judy Tyrell	1 episode
1976	Starsky & Hutch	Ellen Forbes	1 episode
1977	McMillan & Wife	Lydia Corman	1 episode
1977	Quincy, M.E.	Melissa Asten	1 episode
1977	The Rockford Files	Karen Hall	1 episode
1978	Logan's Run	Marianne	1 episode
1979	Salem's Lot	June Petrie	Television miniseries
1980	Benson	Lily Maxwell	1 episode
1981	Taxi	Karen	1 episode
1981	Flo	Louise Browning	1 episode
1978–1982	Dallas	Liz Craig	16 episodes
1983	Cheers	Lana Marshall	1 episode
1984	The Four Seasons	Lorraine Elliot	13 episodes
1984	Steambath	Wanda Blakely	Episode: "Madison Avenue Madness"
1985	Hotel	Monica Shawcross	1 episode
1986	Mr. Sunshine	Mrs. June Swinford	11 episodes
1981–1982, 1984, 1986, 1987	Hill Street Blues	Grace Gardner	16 episodes Primetime Emmy Award for Outstanding Lead Actress in a Drama Series (1981)
1987	The New Alfred Hitchcock Presents	Cissie Enright	1 episode CableACE Award for Outstanding Actress in a Dramatic Series (1988)
1987	Remington Steele	Marisa Peters	2 episodes
1987–1988	The Law & Harry McGraw	Ellie Maginnis	16 episodes
1989–1990	Empty Nest	Paula Conroy	2 episodes
1990	The Golden Girls	Charmaine Hollingsworth	1 episode
1990	China Beach	Lieutenant Colonel Libby Heiss	1 episode
1991	Wings	Mae Hackett	1 episode
1985–1993	Murder, She Wrote	Various roles	5 episodes
1993–1998	Dr. Quinn, Medicine Woman	Dorothy Jennings	100 episodes Nominated— Primetime Emmy Award for Outstanding Supporting Actress in a Drama Series (1995)
1998	Chicago Hope	Beverly Kronk	2 episodes
2000	The Pretender	Edna Raines	2 episodes
2001	Frasier	Penelope Janvier	1 episode
2001–2002	Pasadena	Lillian Greeley	8 episodes
2002–2004	Judging Amy	Diane McCarty	2 episodes
