= Christmas Miracle in Caufield, U.S.A. =

1977 film directed by Jud Taylor

- VHS cover
- Genre: Drama
- Written by: Dalene Young
- Directed by: Jud Taylor
- Starring: Kurt Russell; Melissa Gilbert
- Music by: Fred Karlin
- Country of origin: United States
- Original language: English

Production
- Producer: Lin Bolen
- Production location: Roundup, Montana
- Cinematography: Terry K. Meade
- Editor: Peter Parasheles
- Running time: 97 minutes
- Production companies: 20th Century Fox Television; Lin Bolen Productions

Original release
- Network: NBC
- Release: December 26, 1977

Christmas Miracle in Caufield, U.S.A. (also released as The Christmas Coal Mine Miracle) is a 1977 American made-for-television drama film directed by Jud Taylor.

== Plot ==
Inspired by true events, the plot takes place in 1950 and revolves around Mr. Caufield, the owner of a coal mine. During Christmas, there are several explosions. His employees worry about their health and decide to strike, without any luck. One of the miners, Johnny, is determined to improve the working conditions and wants the other miners to have a great holiday. However, this goes terribly wrong when they are trapped underground following an explosion. Their families are desperate to save them, worrying there might be an even bigger and deadlier explosion.

== Cast ==
- Mitchell Ryan as Matthew Sullivan
- Kurt Russell as Johnny
- Andrew Prine as Arthur
- John Carradine as Grampa
- Barbara Babcock as Rachel Sullivan
- Don Porter as Caufield
- Karen Lamm as Matilda Sullian
- Melissa Gilbert as Kelly Sullivan
- Bill McKinney as Willie

== See also ==
- List of Christmas films
