= Michael Cole (actor) =

American actor (1940–2024)

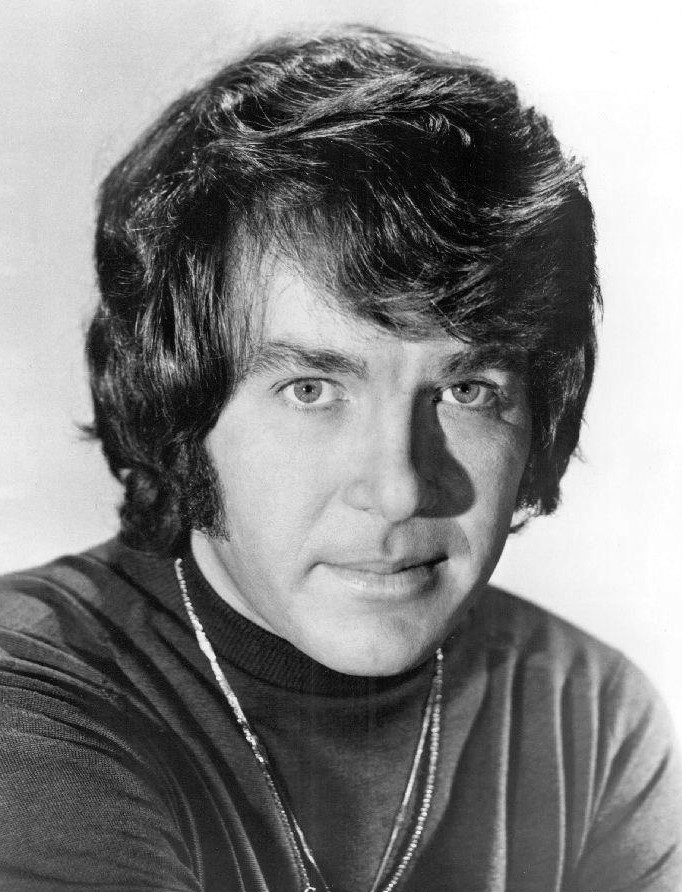
- Cole in 1973
- Born: July 3, 1940; Madison, Wisconsin, U.S.
- Died: December 10, 2024 (aged 84); Tarzana, California, U.S.
- Occupation: Actor
- Years active: 1961–2010
- Spouse: Shelley Funes (m. 1996)
- Children: 3

Michael Cole (July 3, 1940 – December 10, 2024) was an American actor best known for his role as Pete Cochran on the television crime drama The Mod Squad (1968–1973).

== Early life ==
Cole was born in Madison, Wisconsin, on July 3, 1940. In a Sept 10, 2018 video interview, Michael said he slept under a freeway bridge when he first arrived in Hollywood. Later on, a huge Mod Squad billboard happened to be erected on the same freeway bridge, where Michael had once camped below.

== Career ==
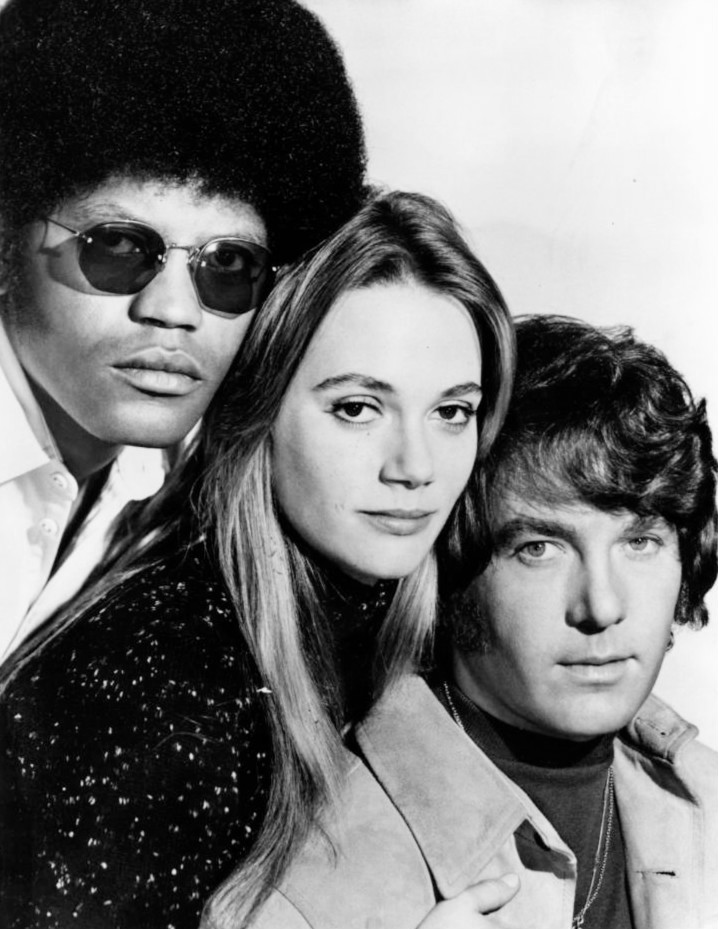
The Mod Squad main cast in 1971 from left: Clarence Williams III, Peggy Lipton and Cole

Cole appeared in numerous films and television shows, beginning in 1961 with a role in the film drama Forbid Them Not. His other film credits include the role of Mark in the 1966 science fiction film The Bubble, later re-titled Fantastic Invasion of Planet Earth; Spivey in the western Chuka (1967); Alan Miller in The Last Child (1971), that was nominated for the Best Movie Made for TV Golden Globe Award in 1972; and as Cliff Norris in Beg, Borrow or Steal (1973). He did a great deal of stage work after The Mod Squad went off the air, including Cat on a Hot Tin Roof.

Cole also appeared on Gunsmoke, in 1966, as Kipp. During the 1970s, he had many guest appearances on Wonder Woman, The Love Boat and CHiPs, and in 1978 appeared in the made-for-TV thriller Evening in Byzantium . In the 1980s and 1990s, he worked on Nickel Mountain. He also worked on shows such as The Eddie Capra Mysteries; Murder, She Wrote; Fantasy Island, and Diagnosis: Murder. Later, Cole appeared as the disturbed adult Henry Bowers in Stephen King's 1990 two-part TV miniseries It. During his brief role in the miniseries, he started to enjoy the scene where Henry nearly murders Mike Hanlon. In 1991, he joined the cast of General Hospital in the role of Harlan Barrett.

But it was his role as Pete Cochran, a troubled youth turned crime fighter in The Mod Squad (1968–1973), that made Cole an international celebrity. Cole's boyish good looks and brooding, deep-voiced personality meshed perfectly with his character's backstory—a ne'er-do-well son of wealthy parents who had evicted him from their home after he had stolen a car. Produced by Aaron Spelling and Danny Thomas, The Mod Squad resonated with counterculture-era viewers and ran for five seasons, during which a total of 123 episodes were produced.

According to TV Guide, Cole initially balked at the part of Peter Cochran when he realized he would be playing an undercover cop, saying: "I'm not going to take the part of a guy who finks on his friends!" He changed his mind, however, when he read the script and gathered the show's potential appeal.

Cole is also known for an incident in 1973 which was broadcast live on Australian television during the annual TV Week Logie Awards. Stepping on stage to accept an award, Cole described in subsequent news articles as either drunk or "in a tired and emotional state". – gave a barely coherent "thank you" speech that ended with the actor saying, "Oh, shit." This was the first time this profanity had been heard on Australian television.

Cole went through treatment in the Betty Ford Clinic in the early 1990s to get his drinking problem under control.

Cole later played Charles Hadley in a 2006 episode of the television series ER. Also in 2006, Cole played opposite Clarence Williams III in Mystery Woman: At First Sight, an episode of the Mystery Woman film series that aired on the Hallmark Channel. Cole later made an appearance in the 2007 thriller Mr. Brooks as the attorney for Demi Moore's character of Detective Tracy Atwood.

== Personal life ==
Cole was married three times and divorced twice. He had two children from his first marriage, and a daughter from the second marriage. Cole married Shelley Funes in 1996. Funes helped stage an intervention for Cole's alcoholism, and he remained sober afterward.

Cole died at the Providence Tarzana Medical Center in Tarzana, California, on December 10, 2024 at the age of 84.

== Filmography ==
- Gunsmoke (1966, TV) as Kipp
- The Bubble (1966) as Mark
- Chuka (1967) as Spivey
- The Mod Squad (1968–1973, TV) as Pete Cochran
- The Last Child (1971, TV Movie) as Alan Miller
- Police Story (1973 TV series) (1975, TV) as Det. Lew Reeves in "The Witness"
- Wonder Woman (1978, TV) as Ted
- The Love Boat (1979, TV) as Mike Kelly
- The Littlest Hobo (1979, TV) as Phil in 'Second Chance'
- The Return of the Mod Squad (1979, TV Movie) as Pete Cochran
- CHiPs (1979–1981, TV) as himself/Tom Gibson
- Beyond Westworld (1980, TV) as Corey Burns
- Fantasy Island (1981, TV) as Falco
- Nickel Mountain (1984) as Henry Soames
- Murder, She Wrote (1987–1990, TV) as Earl Tuchman/Lt. John Meyerling
- It (1990, TV) as Henry Bowers
- General Hospital (1991, TV) as Harlan Barrett
- Diagnosis: Murder (1996, TV) as Senator Terrence Bell
- ER (2006, TV) as Charles Hadley
- Mr. Brooks (2007) as Atwood's Lawyer
- Grave Misconduct (2008, TV Movie) as Jason Connelly
- Pennywise: The Story of It (2021, Documentary film) as Himself

== Bibliography ==
- I Played the White Guy. BearManor Media. 2018. ISBN 978-1-62933-296-3.
