= Attack on Fear =

- Genre: Crime; Drama
- Based on: The Light on Synanon by Dave Mitchell, Cathy Mitchell, Richard Ofshe
- Written by: T. S. Cook
- Directed by: Mel Damski
- Starring: Paul Michael Glaser; Linda Kelsey; Kevin Conway; John Harkins; Alan Fudge; Barbara Babcock
- Music by: Tony Berg
- Country of origin: United States
- Original language: English

Production
- Producer: Herbert Hirschman
- Cinematography: Donald M. Morgan
- Editor: Leonard Malek
- Running time: 100 minutes
- Production company: Tomorrow Entertainment

Original release
- Network: CBS
- Release: October 10, 1984

Attack on Fear is a 1984 American made-for-television drama film directed by Mel Damski and starring Paul Michael Glaser, Linda Kelsey, Kevin Conway and Barbara Babcock. It premiered on CBS on October 10, 1984. The teleplay by T. S. Cook is based on the 1980 book The Light on Synanon: How a Country Weekly Exposed a Corporate Cult written by Dave Mitchell, Cathy Mitchell and Richard Ofshe.

== Overview ==
Paul Michael Glaser and Linda Kelsey portray Dave and Cathy Mitchell, the new owners of a small-circulation weekly newspaper called The Point Reyes Light in Marin County, California. Upon hearing of iniquities at the famed Santa Monica drug rehabilitation center Synanon, the Mitchells begin publishing their evidence. Despite legal pressure from Synanon and bizarre anonymously mailed threats, the Mitchells' story results in a major investigation of the revered institution.

Although Attack on Fear was completed in 1982, it was not telecast until October 1984 and then only after being reshaped to satisfy Synanon's battery of attorneys.

== Cast ==
- Paul Michael Glaser as Dave Mitchell
- Linda Kelsey as Cathy Mitchell
- Kevin Conway as Richard Ofshe
- John Harkins as Banner
- Alan Fudge as Art Disterhoft
- Barbara Babcock as Jane Dutton
- Tom Villard as Keith
- Jerry Hardin as Sheriff Bergus
- Hugh Reilly as Lofgren
- Wendy Goldman as Gail
- Jack Gregory as Thompkins
- Patricia E. Parris as Bonnie
- Gary Bayer as Veteran Reporter
- Michael Mallory as SWAT Officer
- David Roberts as Seth Anderson
