= The Last Child (film) =

- Genre: Drama; Science Fiction; Thriller
- Written by: Peter S. Fischer
- Directed by: John Llewellyn Moxey
- Starring: Michael Cole; Van Heflin; Harry Guardino; Janet Margolin
- Music by: Laurence Rosenthal
- Country of origin: United States
- Original language: English

Production
- Executive producer: Aaron Spelling
- Producer: William Allyn
- Production location: Paramount Studios
- Cinematography: Archie R. Dalzell
- Editor: Art Seid
- Running time: 73 minutes
- Production company: Aaron Spelling Productions

Original release
- Network: ABC
- Release: October 5, 1971

The Last Child is a 1971 American TV film. It was made for the ABC Movie of the Week anthology series and was the last film of Van Heflin.

== Plot ==
In the future, overpopulation has meant that, in the United States, people are allowed to have only one child and are denied all medical care (save for palliative care) when they turn 65.

== Reception ==
Reviewing the film in the present day for the SF Weekly, David-Elijah Nahmod wrote:

When The Last Child was first broadcast on ABC in October 1971, star Michael Cole was enjoying a brief brush with stardom on the hit cop show The Mod Squad. The actor proved his acting chops with this intense drama set in the “not too distant future”.

Many issues come up during the film’s 71 minute running time — The Last Child remains potent and topical even today.

The last child is about women being allowed to have ONLY one child. Nothing to do with women's rights or a woman's control of her body. She can have ONE child, if she wants. One. Having two is against the law.

Cole and Janet Margolin star as Alan and Karen, a couple still mourning the loss of their baby the year before. Karen is pregnant again, but in the grossly overpopulated futuristic society they live in, only one child per couple is allowed.

The fact that Karen’s baby died is of little consequence to the population control police, headed by a sociopathic Ed Asner. Asner was, at the time, achieving TV immortality for his delightful portrayal of the grumpy-if-kindhearted Mr. Grant on The Mary Tyler Moore Show. He offers a deliciously over-the-top, against-type performance as The Last Child’s villain.

== Cast ==
- Michael Cole as Alan Miller
- Janet Margolin as Karen Miller
- Harry Guardino as Howard Drumm
- Van Heflin as Senator Quincy George
- Edward Asner as Barstow
- Kent Smith as Gus Iverson
- Michael Larrain as Sandy
- Ivor Francis as Dr. Young
- Roy Engel as Conductor
- Philip Bourneuf as Dr. Tyler
- Phyllis Avery as Nurse
- Barbara Babcock as Shelley Drumm
- Victor Izay as Silverman
