= Criminal Minds season 4 =

Season of television series Criminal Minds

Criminal Minds
- Season 4
- Season 4 U.S. DVD cover
- Starring: Joe Mantegna; Paget Brewster; Shemar Moore; Matthew Gray Gubler; A. J. Cook; Kirsten Vangsness; Thomas Gibson
- No. of episodes: 26

Release
- Original network: CBS
- Original release: September 24, 2008 – May 20, 2009

Season chronology
- ← Previous; Season 3 Next → Season 5

The fourth season of Criminal Minds premiered on CBS on September 24, 2008, and ended May 20, 2009.

== Cast ==
=== Main ===
- Joe Mantegna as Supervisory Special Agent David Rossi (BAU Senior Agent)
- Paget Brewster as Supervisory Special Agent Emily Prentiss (BAU Agent)
- Shemar Moore as Supervisory Special Agent Derek Morgan (BAU Agent)
- Matthew Gray Gubler as Supervisory Special Agent Dr. Spencer Reid (BAU Agent)
- A. J. Cook as Supervisory Special Agent Jennifer "JJ" Jareau (BAU Communications Liaison)
- Kirsten Vangsness as Special Agent Penelope Garcia (BAU Technical Analyst)
- Thomas Gibson as Supervisory Special Agent Aaron "Hotch" Hotchner (BAU Unit Chief)

=== Special guest star ===
- Luke Perry as Benjamin Cyrus
- Jason Alexander as Professor Rothchild
- Cybill Shepherd as Leona Gless

=== Recurring ===
- Meta Golding as Special Agent Jordan Todd (BAU Interim Communications Liaison)
- Nicholas Brendon as Kevin Lynch
- Jane Lynch as Diana Reid
- Cade Owens as Jack Hotchner
- Josh Stewart as William "Will" LaMontagne Jr.

== Guest stars ==
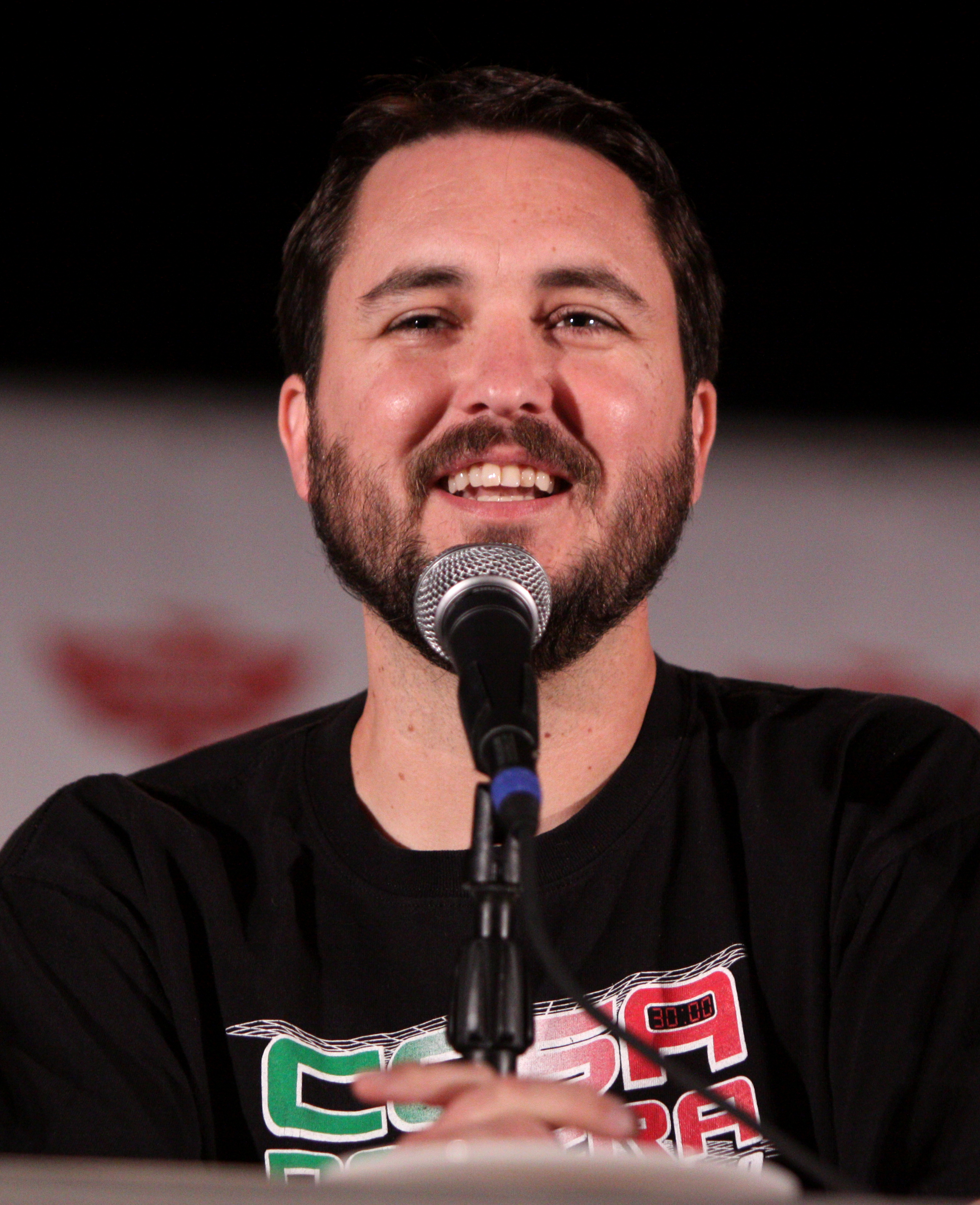
Wil Wheaton appears in the episode "Paradise" as Floyd Hansen.

In the season premiere "Mayhem", Sienna Guillory and Erik Palladino reprise as SSA Kate Joyner and Detective Cooper, respectively. Adoni Maropis guest-starred as Ben Abner, a member of the NYC Terrorist Cell who disguises as a paramedic, and Michael Steger guest-starred as Sam, another member of the cell. In the episode "The Angel Maker", Lauren Bowles guest-starred as Chloe Kelcher, the copycat killer and love interest of Courtland Bryce Ryan, aka "The Angel Maker", played by Neil Hopkins. Blake Lindsley guest-starred as Shara Carlino, another attempted copycat and admirer of Ryan. In the episode "Minimal Loss", Luke Perry guest-starred as Benjamin Cyrus, the leader of a religious cult known as the "Separatarian Sect". Jeff Fahey guest-starred as Leo Kane, an inmate and fervent libertarian who founded the Liberty Ranch. In the episode "Paradise", William Mapother and Robyn Lively guest-starred as Ian and Abby Corbin, a married couple who go on vacation, only to be held captive by Floyd Hansen.

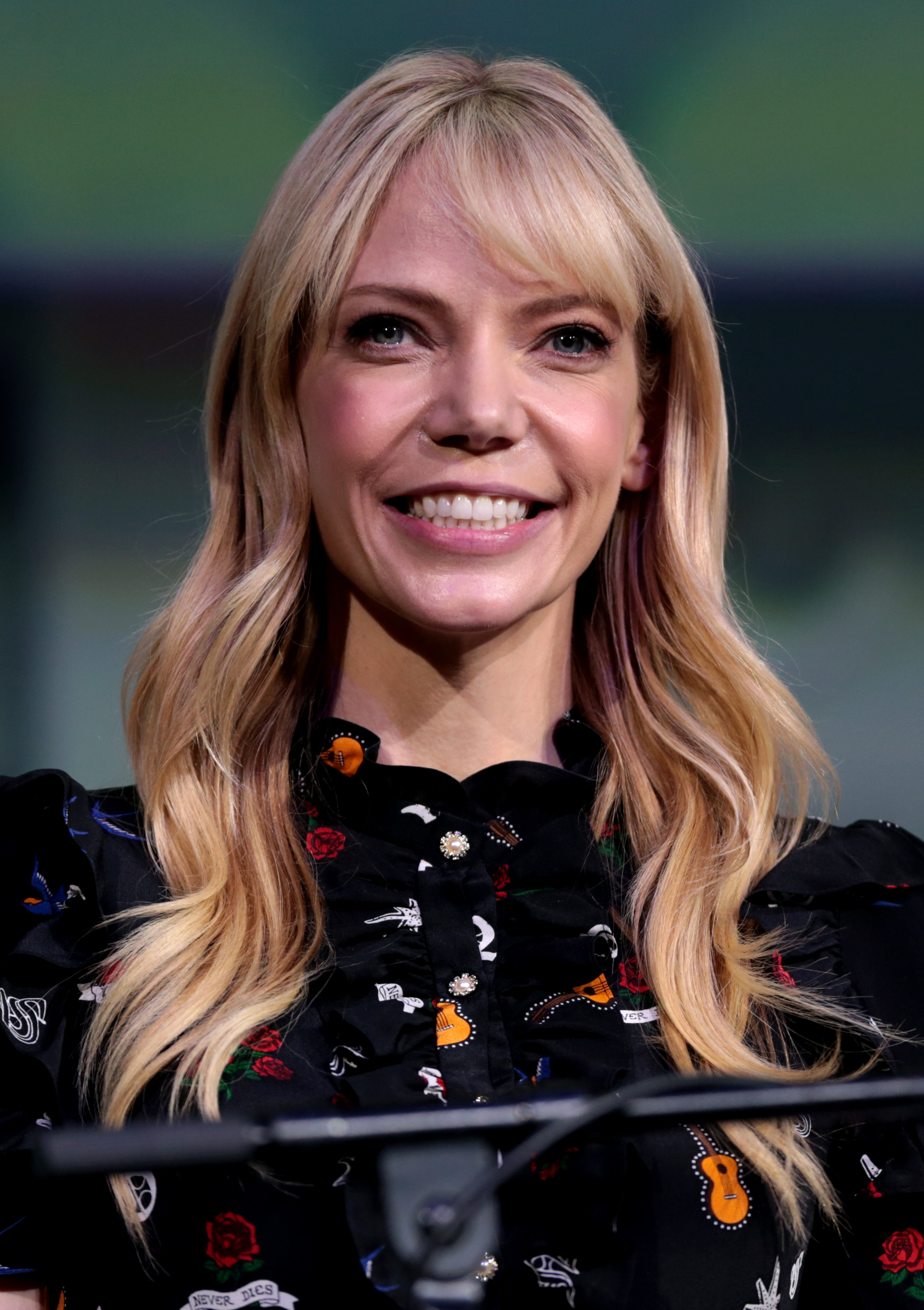
Riki Lindhome appears in the episode "52 Pickup" as Vanessa Holden.

In the episode "The Instincts", Melinda Page Hamilton guest-starred as Claire Bates, a child abductor who kidnaps a young boy. In the episode "Memoriam", Taylor Nichols guest-starred as Spencer Reid's father, William, who confesses to murdering Gary Michaels, a pedophile who intended to rape and murder Reid after he already raped and murdered another young boy. Dee Wallace guest starred as Reid's therapist, Dr. Jan Mohikian. In the episode "Masterpiece", Jason Alexander guest-starred as Henry Grace, a serial killer obsessed with the fibonacci sequence. In the episode "52 Pickup", Gabriel Olds guest-starred as Robert Parker, a serial killer who has perfected his skills as a pick-up artist. Courtney Ford guest-starred as Austin, a bartender who develops a crush on Reid. Currie Graham guest-starred as Paul "Viper" Thomas, another pick-up artist who was a suspect in the murders, and Joanna Cassidy guest-starred as Mrs. Holden, a woman whose youngest daughter Vanessa, is murdered by Parker.

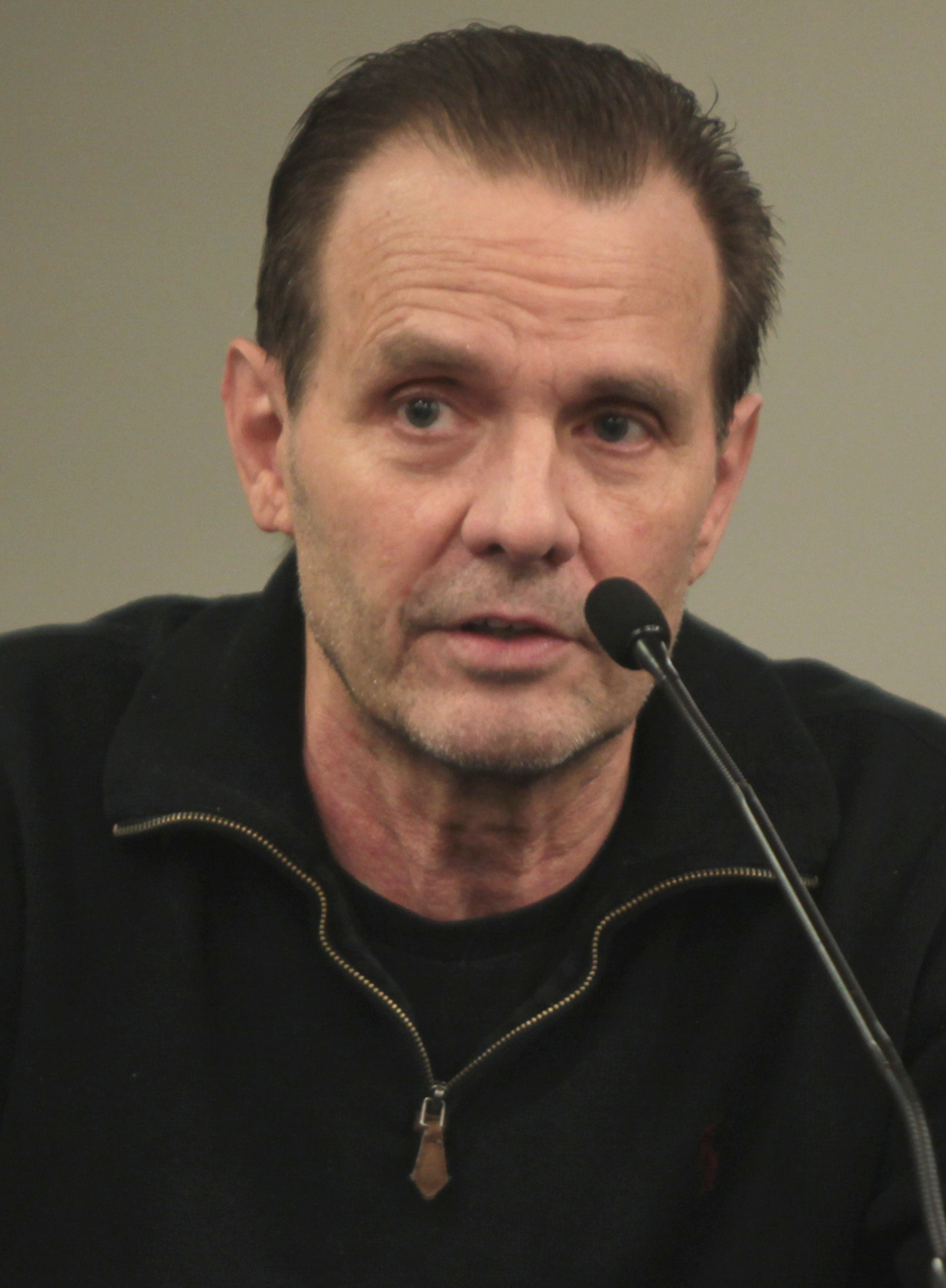
Michael Biehn appears in the episode "Cold Comfort" as Det. Ron Fullwood.

In the episode “Brothers in Arms”, Mark Pellegrino guest-starred as Lt. Evans of the Phoenix, Arizona police department. Guillermo Díaz guest-starred as gang member and suspect Playboy, and Doug Jones appeared as fight club captain Beanie. In the episode "Normal", Mitch Pileggi guest-starred as Norman Hill, aka "The Road Warrior", a man who goes on a murderous rampage after murdering his entire family, with Danny Nucci making a brief appearance. Faith Ford guest-starred as Norman's deceased wife, Vanessa, and Gina Torres guest-starred as Detective Thea Salinas, who leads the investigation of the murders. Elaine Hendrix guest-starred as one of Norman’s victims. In the episode "Soul Mates", George Newbern and Michael Boatman guest-starred as Steven Baleman and William Harris, aka, "The Soul Mates", a duo of serial rapists who murdered several women. Dana Davis guest-starred as William's daughter Andrea. In the episode "Bloodline", Andrew Divoff and Cynthia Gibb guest-starred as Lewis and Kathy "Sylvia" Gray, a gypsy couple who abducted young girls for their son to marry by the time he comes of age.

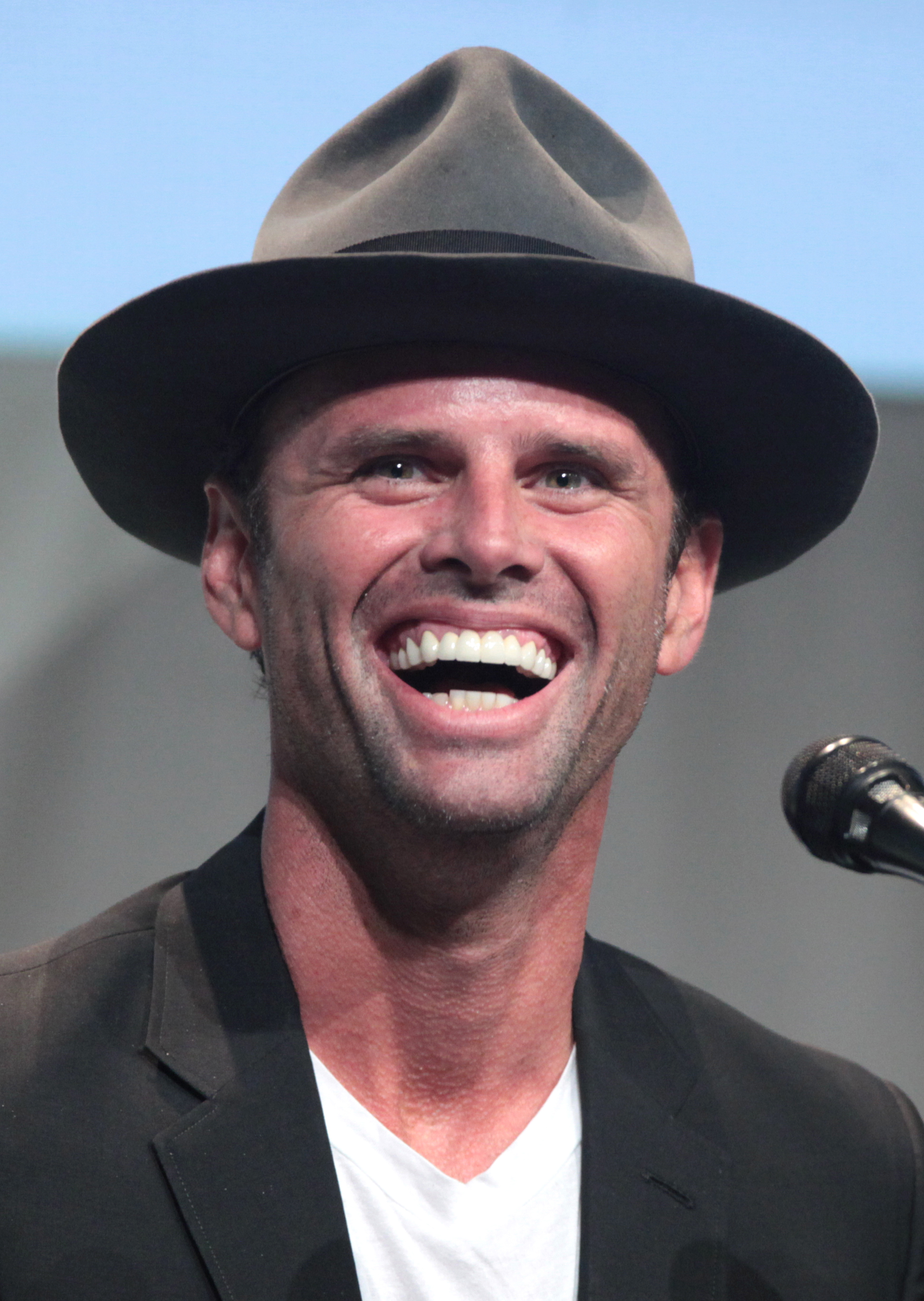
The Shield star Walton Goggins appears in the episode "Demonology" as John Cooley.

In the episode "Cold Comfort", Vondie Curtis-Hall guest-starred as Stanley Usher, a self-proclaimed psychic of whom David Rossi is skeptical, and Cybill Shepherd as Leona Gless. In the episode "Zoe's Reprise", Amy Davidson guest-starred as Zoe Hawkes, an admirer of Rossi who aspires to become an FBI agent, only to be murdered by Eric Olson, played by Johnny Lewis. Shannon Woodward guest-starred as Eric's girlfriend, Linda Jones. In the episode "Pleasure Is My Business", Brianna Brown guest starred as Megan Kane, a call girl who fatally poisons her clients. In the episode "Demonology", Carmen Argenziano guest-starred as Father Paul Silvano, an Italian priest who murders his victims through exorcisms. Bruce Davison guest-starred as Father Jimmy Davison.

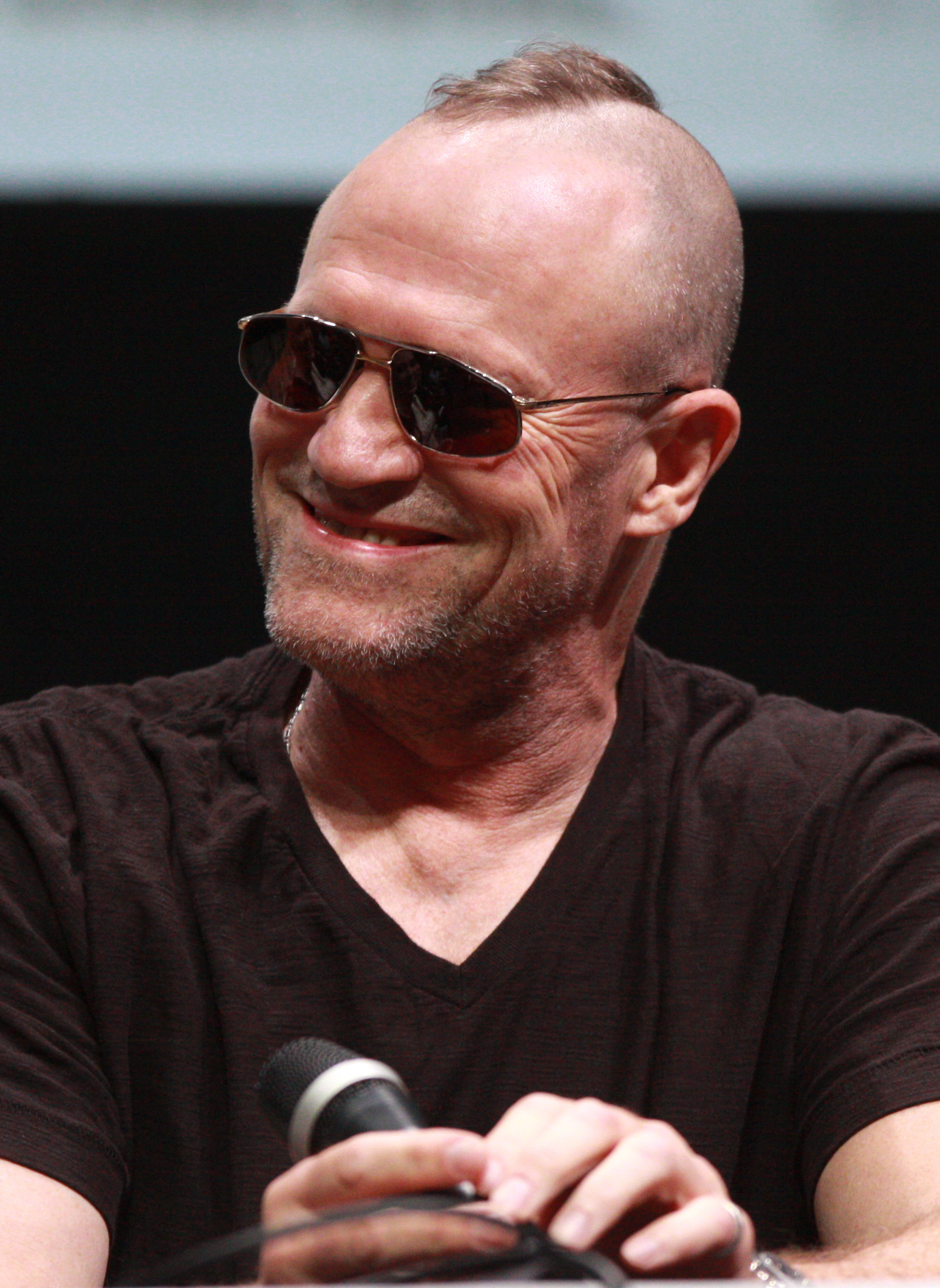
The Walking Dead star Michael Rooker appears in the episode "House on Fire" as Chief Brad Carlson.

In the episode "Omnivore", C. Thomas Howell guest-starred as George Foyet, the only person who survived a string of killings committed by a killer known as "The Boston Reaper". Louis Ferreira guest-starred as Roy Colson, a novelist and the author of the novel Night of The Reaper. In the episode "House on Fire", Tommy Dewey guest-starred as Tommy Wheeler, a serial arsonist who burns down a movie theater, killing everyone trapped in it. Shannon Lucio guest-starred as Tommy's sister Tina. In the episode "Conflicted", Jackson Rathbone guest-starred as Adam Jackson, a delusional serial killer who has a female alter-ego named Amanda. Susan Ward guest-starred as Julie Riley, a hotel manager who was suspected of committing the murders of several men. Roma Maffia guest-starred as Detective Reese Evans, who leads the investigation of the murders.

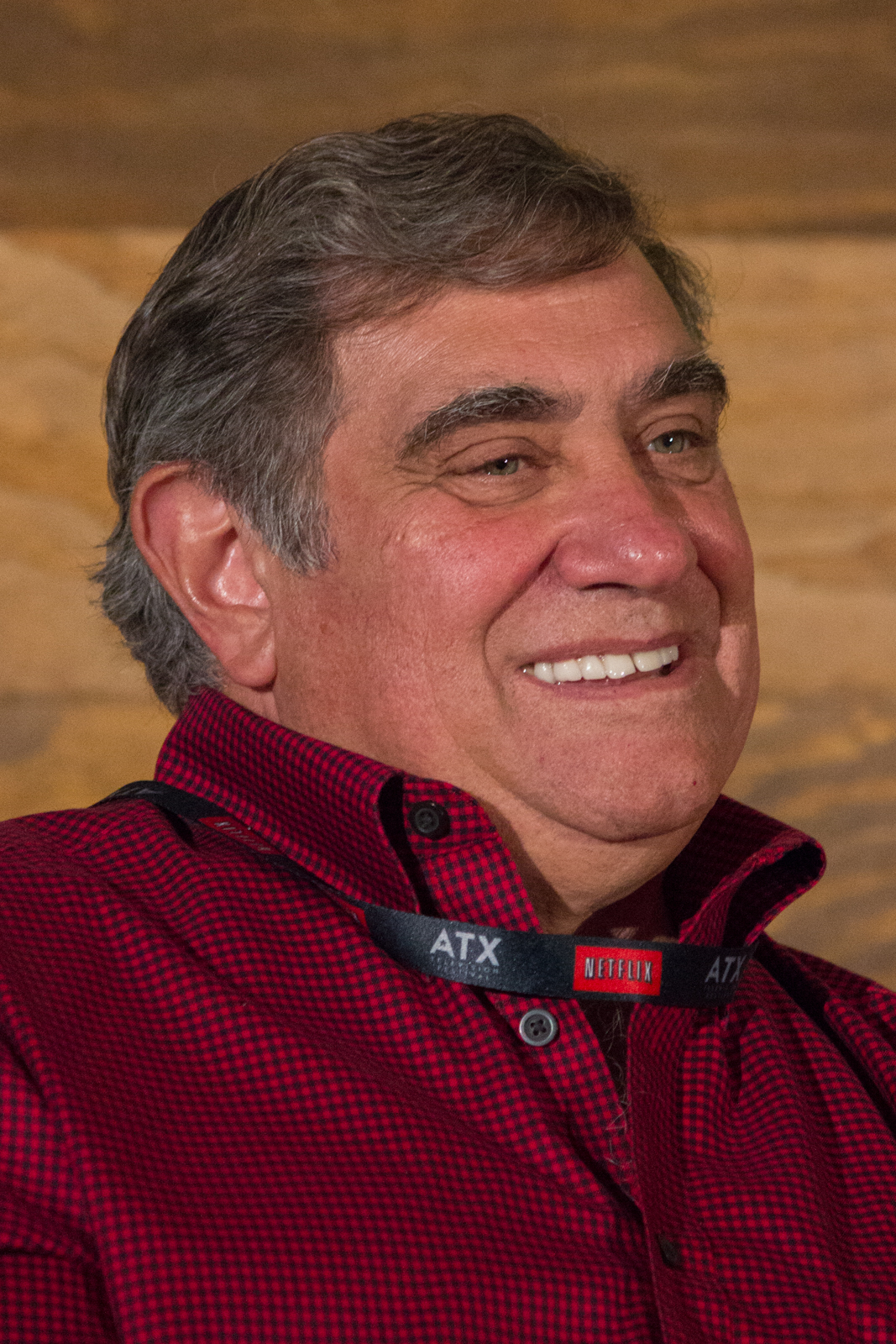
Dan Lauria appears in the episode "Amplification" as Gen. Lee Whitworth.

In the episode "The Big Wheel", Alex O'Loughlin guest-starred as Vincent Rowlings, a repentant serial killer who suffers from uncontrollable homicidal urges. Timothy Carhart plays a detective in "Roadkill". In the episode "Amplification", Tamlyn Tomita guest-starred as Dr. Linda Kimura, who aids the BAU with the investigation of an anthrax outbreak that has infected several people. In the two-part season finale "To Hell and Back", Garret Dillahunt guest-starred as Mason Turner, whose developmentally disabled brother and partner in crime, Lucas, abducts a teenage girl and holds her captive at a barn in Canada. C. Thomas Howell reprises as George Foyet, who breaks into Aaron Hotchner's apartment and seemingly shoots him. Hotch's fate is left unknown until the premiere of the following season.

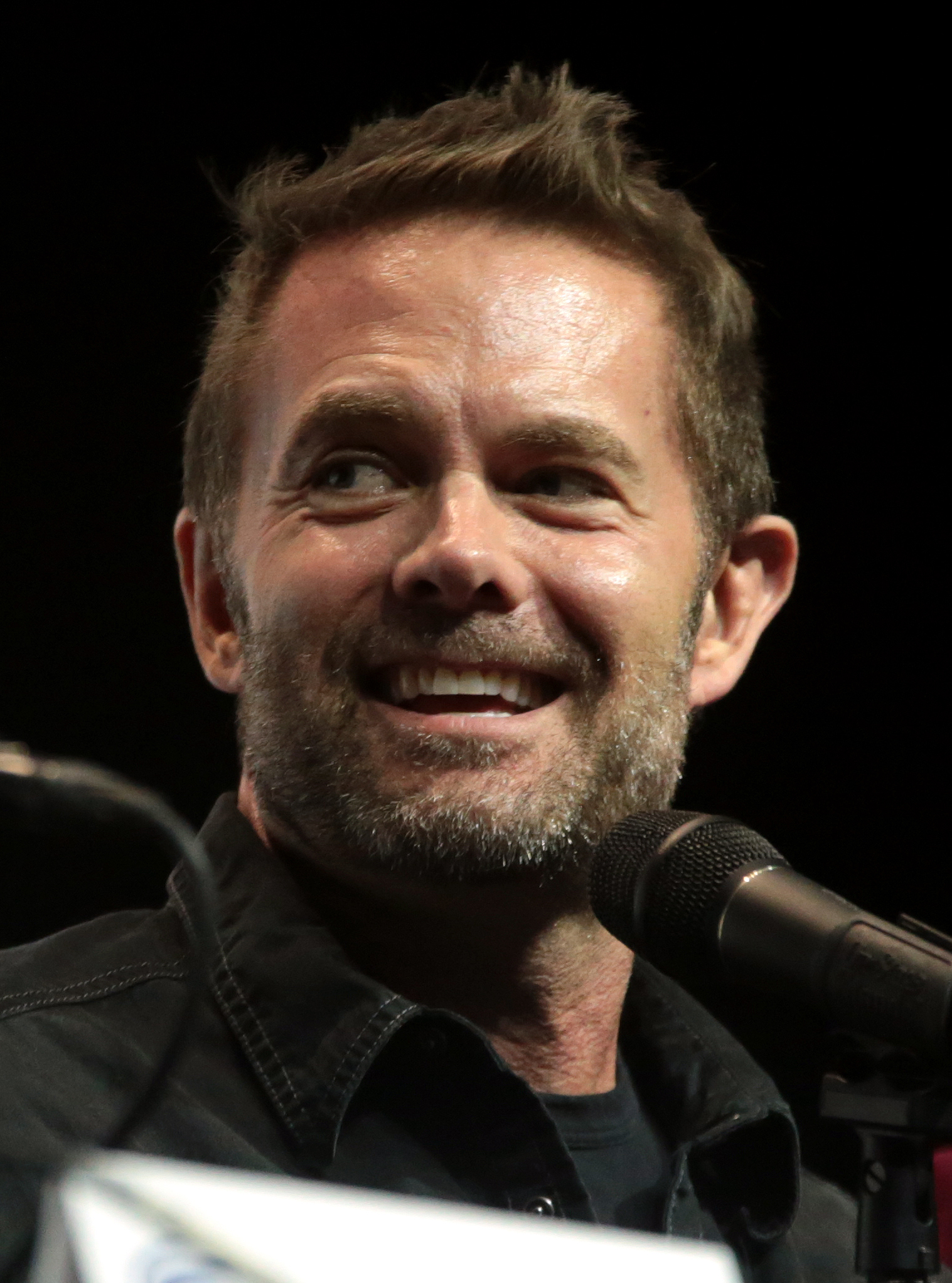
Garret Dillahunt appears in the episode "To Hell... and Back" as Mason Turner.

== Episodes ==
No. overall	No. in season	Title	Directed by	Written by	Original release date	Prod. code	U.S. viewers (millions)
66	1	"Mayhem"	Edward Allen Bernero	Simon Mirren	September 24, 2008	401	17.01
As the BAU continues to investigate the New York City shootings, a bomb placed under a government-owned SUV detonates. The team finds themselves in a race against time as they work to determine if one of their own was injured and apprehend the people responsible before a larger-scale incident occurs.
67	2	"The Angel Maker"	Glenn Kershaw	Dan Dworkin & Jay Beattie	October 1, 2008	402	14.78
When an Ohio woman is murdered on the anniversary of the execution of a serial killer who targeted six other women in the same area 10 years earlier, the BAU determines a copycat is attempting to finish what the original killer started. Meanwhile, Hotch struggles to recover from a debilitating injury he suffered during the previous case.
68	3	"Minimal Loss"	Félix Alcalá	Andrew Wilder	October 8, 2008	403	16.19
When La Plata County, Colorado authorities are dispatched to investigate a 911 call alleging child abuse at a compound belonging to a religious cult, Prentiss and Reid go undercover only to find themselves as part of a high-stakes hostage crisis after a raid goes disastrously wrong.
69	4	"Paradise"	John Gallagher	Debra J. Fisher & Erica Messer	October 22, 2008	404	15.01
When three unrelated car accidents around Lake Tahoe are revealed to have been staged, the BAU attempts to catch a Nevada killer who abducts and psychologically torments traveling couples.
70	5	"Catching Out"	Charles Haid	Oanh Ly	October 29, 2008	406	13.97
When a series of burglaries in California's Central Valley claim the lives of six people, the BAU determines the killer chooses his victims based on their proximity to the railroad. Meanwhile, JJ prepares to go on maternity leave and introduces the team to prospective temporary replacement Jordan Todd (Meta Golding).
71	6	"The Instincts"	Rob Spera	Chris Mundy	November 5, 2008	405	14.30
When a five-year-old Las Vegas, Nevada boy is found dead and another boy is abducted soon afterwards, the BAU attempts to find a common demoninator between the crimes. Meanwhile, Reid starts suffering from recurring dreams that force him to recall forgotten childhood memories.
72	7	"Memoriam"	Guy Norman Bee	Dan Dworkin & Jay Beattie	November 12, 2008	407	14.83
Following the previous case, Reid decides to stay in Las Vegas in an attempt to determine whether or not his estranged father is responsible for the murder of a childhood friend. Meanwhile, JJ goes into premature labor and gives birth to a son named Henry.
73	8	"Masterpiece"	Paul Michael Glaser	Edward Allen Bernero	November 19, 2008	408	16.33
When a narcissistic Virginia psychopath obsessed with the Fibonacci sequence confesses to killing seven women and claims that an eighth woman along with four young children will die, the BAU attempts to locate his latest victims before time runs out. Meanwhile, Todd struggles to deal with the fact that the team does not yet trust her.
74	9	"52 Pickup"	Bobby Roth	Breen Frazier	November 26, 2008	409	14.11
When three Atlanta, Georgia women are disemboweled and left to bleed to death, the BAU determines the killer is a man who uses his social charm to lure potential victims to their death. Meanwhile, Todd's working relationship with Hotch is put to the test when she lies about her background to the latest victim's mother in an attempt to obtain sensitive information.
75	10	"Brothers in Arms"	Glenn Kershaw	Holly Harold	December 10, 2008	410	14.68
When three Phoenix, Arizona police officers are shot and killed in the line of duty, the BAU juggles gaining the department's trust and building a profile as they set out to catch a killer whose ruthlessness is matched by his determination.
76	11	"Normal"	Steve Boyum	Andrew S. Wilder	December 17, 2008	411	15.16
When an Orange County, California woman narrowly survives a car crash after getting shot, the BAU sets out to catch an emasculated spree killer before he can strike again. Meanwhile, Todd makes a decision that causes her to reevaluate her new position and JJ and her son pay a surprise visit.
77	12	"Soul Mates"	John Gallagher	Debra J. Fisher & Erica Messer	January 14, 2009	412	13.78
After arresting a Sarasota, Florida family man for the abductions and murders of three young women, the BAU works with his teenage daughter in an attempt to identify his partner and prevent him from killing another woman.
78	13	"Bloodline"	Tim Matheson	Mark Linehan Bruner	January 21, 2009	413	13.82
When a Harvest, Alabama couple is stabbed to death in their sleep and their 10-year-old daughter is abducted, the BAU determines the crime was committed by a Romani family enacting a ritual aimed at acquiring wives for growing sons.
79	14	"Cold Comfort"	Anna J. Foerster	Dan Dworkin & Jay Beattie	February 11, 2009	414	12.48
With JJ back from maternity leave, the BAU travels to Olympia, Washington to identify a serial killer responsible for the deaths of three young women, whom he embalms after killing them. Meanwhile, Rossi comes into conflict with a psychic hired by the latest victim's mother.
80	15	"Zoe's Reprise"	Charles S. Carroll	Oanh Ly	February 18, 2009	415	14.54
While investigating a series of seemingly unrelated murders in Cleveland, Ohio, the BAU determines a copycat killer is recreating murder techniques used by past serial killers. Meanwhile, Rossi becomes personally involved in the case after learning that the latest victim was a criminology student who tried to bring the case to his attention.
81	16	"Pleasure Is My Business"	Gwyneth Horder-Payton	Breen Frazier	February 25, 2009	416	13.93
When two corporate executives are poisoned while staying in high-end Dallas, Texas hotels, the BAU juggles searching for a call girl with a sinister vendetta and convincing the victims' lawyers to cooperate.
82	17	"Demonology"	Edward Allen Bernero	Chris Mundy	March 11, 2009	417	14.34
When two Washington, D.C. men are found dead under suspicious circumstances, the BAU determines a Catholic priest deliberately subjected both victims to fatal exorcisims. Meanwhile, Prentiss becomes emotionally involved in the case after learning that the second victim was a childhood friend.
83	18	"Omnivore"	Nelson McCormick	Andrew S. Wilder	March 18, 2009	418	13.74
When a Boston, Massachusetts serial killer resurfaces after a 10-year absence, the BAU sets out to catch him before he can pick up where he left off. Meanwhile, Hotch becomes personally involved in the investigation when the former lead investigator reveals a stunning secret.
84	19	"House on Fire"	Félix Alcalá	Holly Harold	March 25, 2009	419	14.36
When an escalating Indiana serial arsonist torches a recreation center and a movie theater, killing a total of 31 people, the BAU races to determine his identity and prevent him from setting another fire before he can strike again.
85	20	"Conflicted"	Jason Alexander	Rick Dunkle	April 8, 2009	420	13.61
When two male college students are sexually assaulted and fatally suffocated while vacationing in South Padre Island, Texas, the BAU finds themselves forced to rethink their initial theories of a two-person team after an unexpected twist changes the course of the investigation.
86	21	"A Shade of Gray"	Karen Gaviola	Debra J. Fisher & Erica Messer	April 22, 2009	421	13.72
While investigating a series of child abductions and murders in Cherry Hill, New Jersey, the BAU uncovers a horrifying truth after noticing several differences between the most recent disappearance and the first two murders.
87	22	"The Big Wheel"	Rob Hardy	Simon Mirren	April 29, 2009	422	13.61
When Buffalo, New York authorities receive a video showing a man stabbing a real estate agent to death and subsequently writing a plea for help, the BAU sets out to catch an obsessive-compulsive serial killer who has murdered several women over the last 10 years.
88	23	"Roadkill"	Steve Boyum	Dan Dworkin & Jay Beattie	May 6, 2009	423	14.13
When two Bend, Oregon women are found dead from apparent hit-and-runs, the BAU determines the victims were targeted by a killer seeking revenge. Meanwhile, Garcia finds herself forced to make a personal decision after Kevin reveals the NSA is interviewing him for an overseas position.
89	24	"Amplification"	John Gallagher	Oanh Ly	May 13, 2009	424	13.37
When a modified strain of anthrax infects 25 people at an Annapolis, Maryland community park, killing 12 of them, the BAU works with the U.S. Armed Forces to identify the perpetrator before he stages another attack. Meanwhile, the team becomes emotionally involved in the case after Reid stumbles into the prime suspect's private home lab and is exposed to the strain.
90	25	"To Hell…"	Charles Haid	Chris Mundy	May 20, 2009	425	13.99
When an Iraq War veteran goes to great lengths to convince authorities to find his missing sister, the BAU sets out to catch a serial killer who abducts homeless people from Detroit, Michigan and smuggles them into Canada for a twisted agenda.
91	26	"…and Back"	Edward Allen Bernero	Edward Allen Bernero	May 20, 2009	426	13.99
After identifying two Ontario brothers as the perpetrators behind the disappearances of over 80 people, the BAU juggles profiling the brothers and preventing their latest abductee from meeting a gruesome fate. Meanwhile, a killer from the team's past prepares to exact vengeance against one of their own.

== Home media ==
The Complete Fourth Season
Set details		Special features
26 episodes; 7-disc set; Aspect Ratio: 2.35:1; Subtitles: English; English: Dolby Digital 5.1		Working the Scene featurettes; Profiled featurettes; Gag Reel
DVD release date
Region 1	Region 2	Region 4
September 8, 2009	March 1, 2010	March 9, 2010
