= Dead Man's Island =

- Genre: Mystery; Thriller
- Based on: Dead Man's Island by Carolyn G. Hart
- Written by: Peter S. Fischer
- Directed by: Peter H. Hunt
- Starring: Barbara Eden; William Shatner; Christopher Atkins; Roddy McDowall; Traci Lords; Morgan Fairchild; David Faustino; Olivia Hussey; Jameson Parker; Don Most
- Music by: Arthur B. Rubinstein
- Country of origin: United States
- Original language: English

Production
- Executive producers: Robert A. Papazian; James G. Hirsch
- Producer: Gene Schwam
- Cinematography: Robert D. Hayes
- Editor: Daniel Cahn
- Running time: 120 minutes
- Production companies: Papazian-Hirsch Productions; Bar-Gene Productions; CBS Productions

Original release
- Network: CBS
- Release: March 5, 1996

Dead Man's Island is a 1996 American made-for-television mystery-thriller film starring Barbara Eden, William Shatner and featuring an ensemble cast: Roddy McDowall, Morgan Fairchild, Traci Lords, David Faustino, Christopher Atkins, Olivia Hussey, Jameson Parker, Christopher Cazenove and Don Most. It is based on the 1993 novel of the same name by Carolyn Hart and premiered on CBS on March 5, 1996.

== Synopsis ==
Henrietta O'Dwyer Collins (Barbara Eden), known simply as "Henrie O.", is an investigative journalist called to a mysterious remote island by her old friend Chase Prescott (William Shatner) who fears that someone is trying to kill him. The weekend is filled with intrigue as Henrie O. and all the guests try to figure out who is trying to murder their host.

== Cast ==
- Barbara Eden as Henrietta O'Dwyer Collins (Henrie O.)
- William Shatner as Chase Prescott
- Roddy McDowall as Trevor Dunnaway
- Morgan Fairchild as Valerie St. Vincent
- Traci Lords as Miranda Prescott
- David Faustino as Haskell Prescott
- Christopher Atkins as Roger Prescott
- Olivia Hussey as Rosie, the housemaid
- Jameson Parker as Lyle Stedman
- Don Most as Burton Andrews
- Christopher Cazenove as Milo

== Home media ==
Dead Man's Island was released on Region 1 DVD on August 7, 2013, by CBS Home Entertainment.
