= Tagget =

1991 American crime television film

- Genre: Crime; Thriller
- Written by: Irving A. Greenfield; Peter S. Fischer; Richard T. Heffron; Janis Diamond
- Directed by: Richard T. Heffron
- Starring: Daniel J. Travanti; Roxanne Hart; William Sadler; Sarah Douglas
- Music by: Michel Colombier
- Country of origin: United States
- Original language: English

Production
- Executive producer: Andrew Mirisch
- Production location: Beverly Hills High School
- Cinematography: Billy Dickson
- Editors: Robert Hyams; Ralph E. Winters
- Running time: 85 minutes
- Production companies: HBO; Universal Television

Original release
- Network: HBO
- Release: February 14, 1991

Tagget (alternative title Dragonfire) is a 1991 American crime drama / spy film telemovie directed by Richard T. Heffron for HBO.

== Plot ==
The film's title character, a disabled Vietnam War veteran and director of an electronics firm, investigates an attempt to kill him.

== Cast ==
- Daniel A. Travanti
- William Sadler
- Roxanne Hart
- Stephen Tobolowsky
