= George Sherman (publicist) =

American comics publicist

- Born: September 30, 1928 Evanston, Illinois, U.S.
- Died: August 3, 1974 (aged 45) Woodland Hills, U.S.
- Areas: Writer, editor

George Ransom Sherman (September 30, 1928 – August 3, 1974) was a publicist for foreign markets and then head of the Publications Department at the Disney Studios.

== Biography ==
He was the son of Ransom Sherman, an established vaudeville and radio comedian of the day. In the mid-40s the family moved to Hollywood as Ransom built a career in motion pictures and television.

While attending Pomona College he became friends with Roy Disney Jr. who suggested if Sherman ever needed a job he should apply at the Disney Studio. After a stint in the Army Sherman followed up on Roy Jr's offer and went to work at Disney handling publicity for foreign markets. In the mid-1950s he left the studio to briefly edit and publish the Baywood Press in Northern California. Returning to Disney, he became head of the Publications Dept. where he was involved with its licensees both domestic and foreign.

In 1962 he established the Disney Studio Program, producing comic book stories for the foreign market. He provided editorial support to the Program plus authored (or co-authored) the text for several illustrated children books adapting contemporary Disney films (Babes in Toyland, The Absent-Minded Professor) plus did Little Golden Books involving Disney characters (Pinocchio and Ludwig Von Drake). In addition he edited and provided much of the content of the Gulf Oil tie-in Wonderful World of Disney magazine (1969–1970).

Sherman brainstormed with Disney United Kingdom merchandising representative Peter Woods the initial concept of Super Goof.

In the early 1970s through his efforts Carl Barks was granted permission to create and sell oil paintings of the Donald Duck clan. Sherman also gave permission for Barks' ten page story from Walt Disney's Comics and Stories #126 to be reprinted in Les Daniels's book Comix: A History of the Comic Book in America.

After an extended illness Sherman died of paraganglioma, a rare neuroendocrine neoplasm, at the Motion Picture & Television Country House and Hospital. Like his friend Roy E. Disney his ashes were scattered in the Pacific Ocean. Disney paid all his medical bills.

An oil painting of Scrooge McDuck Barks gave to Sherman in gratitude for his aid in arranging permission for the artist to sell paintings of Disney's copyrighted duck characters was sold at auction in 2010 for $20,315.

Sherman's daughter Cathy Sherman Freeman in 2012 published a memoir A Disney Childhood including several chapters on her father.
