= George Carter Sherman Sr. =

American polo player

- Born: April 2, 1880
- Died: January 4, 1933
- Occupation: Polo player

George Carter Sherman Sr. (April 2, 1880 – January 4, 1933) was an American polo player known as the “father of indoor polo.”

== Early life and career ==
George C. Sherman Sr. was the founder of the Indoor Polo Association and its first president from 1915 to 1926. He modified the rules of outdoor polo for indoor use and redesigned standard polo equipment for the arena game’s specific needs, including the introduction of the inflatable polo ball.

The game's origins were not promising. In 1939, the New York Post noted, "Grooms, while exercising some Western horses indoors at Durland's Riding Academy, took to batting a soccer ball about with ordinary kitchen brooms... Sherman and [Robert A.] Granniss, along with several other winter-bound horsemen, improved on that, developing a miniature soccer ball that permitted use of orthodox polo mallets."

In 1928, Sherman presented the first Interscholastic Cup, now known as the George C. Sherman Trophy, given annually to winners of the National Interscholastic Championship. The National Arena Sherman Memorial was started in his honor in 1934 and is still played today.

In February 2020, George C. Sherman Sr. was inducted into the Polo Hall of Fame at the Museum of Polo as the Posthumous Iglehart Inductee. He follows his son, George C. Sherman Jr., who was inducted into the Polo Hall of Fame in 1998 for his contributions to the sport.

In his business life, Sherman was President of Sherman & Bryan advertising in New York City, which became Sherman & Lebair in 1920, and then George C. Sherman Co. In his career, he was also President of the National Outdoor Advertising Bureau, head of the Universal Tobacco Machine Company and of the Fulton Motor Truck Company.

== Death ==
George C. Sherman Sr. died on January 4, 1933, in Greenwich, Connecticut, after a fall in his home.
