= Carolyn Hart =

American mystery author (born 1936)

Carolyn Hart (also known as Carolyn G. Hart) is an American mystery and suspense writer. She is the author of 63 books, including the Death on Demand, Henrie O and Bailey Ruth series. In 2014, she was named a Grand Master by the Mystery Writers of America. She was born in Oklahoma in 1936.

== Biography ==
Hart was born Carolyn Gimpel and was raised in Oklahoma City, Oklahoma, where she still lives. She attended Cleveland Elementary School, Taft Junior High School, and Classen High School. At the age of 11, Hart decided that she wanted to be a newspaper reporter. She worked on school papers beginning in grade school, continuing all the way through her college years.

Hart is a Phi Beta Kappa graduate of the University of Oklahoma (class of 1958), where she majored in journalism. Hart met her husband Philip while traveling in Europe during her junior year in college. After graduation, while her husband attended law school, Hart worked as a newspaper reporter for The Norman Transcript. She gave up journalism after the birth of her son, Philip Jr.

In 1964, the year her daughter Sarah was born, Hart won a writing contest, sponsored by Dodd, Mead and Calling All Girls, calling for a mystery novel that would appeal to adolescent girls. She went on to write several more young adult mysteries between 1965 and 1972. From 1972 to 1987, she wrote nine stand-alone suspense novels and mysteries, with only modest success. Until the publication of mystery novels by Marcia Muller, Sara Paretsky, and Sue Grafton, publishers had little interest in mysteries written by contemporary American female writers; the success of these authors, however, opened the door for Hart's Death on Demand (1987), which became the first in a long-running series of the same name.

Hart's stand-alone World War II novel Letter from Home was nominated for the Pulitzer Prize for Fiction by the Oklahoma Center for Poets and Writers at Oklahoma State University–Tulsa. She has twice appeared as one of the featured mystery authors at the Library of Congress National Book Festival in Washington, D.C.

== Awards ==
Hart has won awards throughout her four-decade writing career.

- Mystery Writers of America Grand Master 2014
- Agatha Award – nine nominations and three wins
- Anthony Award for Best Paperback Original – five nominations and two wins
- Macavity Award for Best Paperback Original – two wins
- Ridley Pearson Award for significant contribution to the mystery field
- Guest of Honor at the Malice Domestic annual conference in 1997 and recipient of its Lifetime Achievement Award in 2007
- Oklahoma Center for the Book award for fiction in 2001 and Lifetime Achievement Award in 2004
- Distinguished Alumnus of the Gaylord College of Journalism and Mass Communication
- Featured mystery author at the Library of Congress National Book Festival on the Mall in Washington DC in 2003 and 2007
- Past president of Sisters in Crime

== Works ==
=== Death on Demand series ===
Hart's first commercially successful adult mystery series features Annie Laurance, proprietor of the Death on Demand bookstore, located in the fictional South Carolina island community of Broward's Rock. By using a mystery bookstore for her background, Hart has given her characters the opportunity to talk freely about other mystery authors and books. One of the ongoing themes of the series is a contest whereby the first customer who correctly identifies a series of five mysteries from the clues in a painting hanging in the shop wins his or her choice of a novel.

1. Death on Demand (1987) also in Something Wicked
2. Design for Murder (1988)
3. Something Wicked (1988)
4. Honeymoon with Murder (1988)
5. A Little Class on Murder (1989)
6. Deadly Valentine (1990)
7. The Christie Caper (1991)
8. Southern Ghost (1992)
9. Mint Julep Murder (1995)
10. Yankee Doodle Dead (1998)
11. White Elephant Dead (1999)
12. Sugarplum Dead (2000)
13. April Fool Dead (2002)
14. Engaged to Die (2003)
15. Murder Walks the Plank (2004)
16. Death of the Party (2005)
17. Dead Days of Summer (2006)
18. Death Walked In (2008)
19. Dare to Die (2009)
20. Laughed 'Til He Died (2010)
21. Dead by Midnight (2011)
22. Death Comes Silently (2012)
23. Dead, White and Blue (2013)
24. Death at the Door (2014)
25. Don't Go Home (2015)
26. Walking on My Grave (2017)

=== Henrie O series ===
Hart's Henrie O mysteries feature 70-something retired newswoman, Henrie O'Dwyer Collins, as she travels the country and the world, solving crimes that seem to follow her as she travels. Henrie gets by on her grit, tenacity, and sensible shoes.

1. Dead Man's Island (1993), turned into a 1996 TV movie starring Barbara Eden and William Shatner
2. Scandal in Fair Haven (1994)
3. Death in Lovers' Lane (1997)
4. Death in Paradise (1998)
5. Death on the River Walk (1999)
6. Resort to Murder (2001)
7. Set Sail for Murder (2007)

=== Bailey Ruth Raeburn series ===
Hart's newest protagonist, the ghost of a woman killed at sea who returns to earth via the "Rescue Express" to help her fictional hometown of Adelaide, Oklahoma while trying not to violate the Precepts for Earthly Visitation and adjusting to her powers on earth.

1. Ghost at Work (2008)
2. Merry, Merry Ghost (2009)
3. Ghost In Trouble (2010)
4. Ghost Gone Wild (2013)
5. Ghost Wanted (2014)
6. Ghost to the Rescue (2015)
7. Ghost Times Two (2016)
8. Ghost on the Case (2017)
9. Ghost Ups Her Game (2020) published by SEVERN House Great Britain and USA

=== Non-series books ===
==== Pre-teens ====
- The Secret of the Cellars (1998, ebook 2013)

==== Teens ====
- Dangerous Summer (1968, ebook 2013)
- No Easy Answers (1970, reprint 2013)
- Rendezvous in Veracruz (1972, reprint 2012)
- Danger, High Explosives! (1972, ebook 2013)

==== Adults ====
- Flee from the Past (1975, reprint 1998, reprint 2012)
- A Settling of Accounts (1976, reprint 2013) also in Secrets and Other Stories of Suspense
- Escape from Paris (1982, reprint 2013)
- The Rich Die Young (1983, reprint 2001)
- Death by Surprise (1983, reprint 2013)
- Skulduggery (1984, reprint 2012)
- The Devereaux Legacy (1986, reprint 2013)
- Brave Hearts (1987, reprint 2013)
- Letter from Home (2003)
- What the Cat Saw (2012)
- Cry in the Night (2013)
- Castle Rock (1983, reprint 2014)
- Cliff's Edge (2014)
- High Stakes (November 2015)
- Peril Off Padre (2018) e-book only

==== Anthologies ====
Collection or Anthology	Contents	Publication Date	Comments
Crimes of the Heart	Riding High	1995	edited anthology
Crime on her Mind		1999 2013 ebook	
Love & Death		2001	edited anthology
Something Wicked	Death on Demand	2004	
Malice Domestic Volume 4		2007	
Secrets and Other Stories of Suspense	Spooked Secrets Turnaround A Settling of Accounts	2008	
Motherhood is Murder	Mothers must do	2009	

=== Non-fiction books ===
- The Sooner Story, 1890–1980 (1980, with Charles F. Long)
