= David V. Mitchell =

American editor and publisher (1943–2023)

David Vokes Mitchell (November 23, 1943 – October 26, 2023) was an American editor and publisher of a small-town newspaper, the Point Reyes Light. In 1979, while he and his former wife Cathy Casto Mitchell together published The Light, the paper became one of the few weekly newspapers to ever win a Pulitzer Prize.

== Life ==
Mitchell was born in San Francisco, California, to Herbert Houston Mitchell (1902–1984) and Edith Vokes Mitchell (1906–1975). Herbert Mitchell was vice president and a minority partner in the San Francisco printing company Kennedy-ten Bosch. Mitchell's mother, whose maiden name was Edith Alfred Vokes, was an immigrant from Canada. Both his parents were Christian Scientists, and his mother for several years sold advertising for The Christian Science Monitor.

When Mitchell, an only child, was three, the family moved to Berkeley, where he later attended Berkeley High School. He spent his last three semesters in St. Louis, where he graduated in 1961 from Principia Upper School.

In 1965, Mitchell earned a bachelor's degree in English from Stanford University where his father had graduated in 1924. While still an undergraduate, Mitchell married Linda Foor in 1965, but the marriage lasted only a year. In 1967, Mitchell received a master's degree in Communications from Stanford.

After teaching a semester at Marvel Academy in Rye, New York, Mitchell left in December 1967 to marry Catherine “Cathy” Casto, whom he had met in graduate school. The couple relocated to Leesburg, Florida, where he taught Speech and Literature at Leesburg. Leesburg in the spring of 1968 was still segregated, and Mitchell joined efforts to register black voters.

From September 1968 to June 1970, Mitchell taught English, world literature, and journalism at Upper Iowa University in Fayette, Iowa. He also was the faculty advisor to the student newspaper, The Collegian, and the black student union, The Brotherhood.

From June to December 1970, Mitchell was the city hall reporter for the daily newspaper in Council Bluffs, Iowa, The Nonpareil. From 1971 to 1973, Mitchell covered Tuolumne County government for the daily newspaper in Sonora, California, The Union Democrat. From 1973 to 1975, Mitchell edited the weekly Sebastopol Times in Sonoma County, California, and his wife Cathy was the paper's feature editor.

== The Point Reyes Light ==
Light won the Pulitzer gold medal for Meritorious Public Service. It was only the fourth year since the prizes were created in 1917 that any Pulitzer went to a weekly newspaper.

The prize was for an exposé of Synanon Incorporated, a onetime drug-rehabilitation program that changed its name to the Church of Synanon and evolved into a violent cult.

The Light intensified its reporting on Synanon, which was headquartered in the nearby town of Marshall, in early 1978 as violent incidents involving its followers began coming to the newspaper's attention.

At the height of its violence, Synanon members on October 10, 1978, tried to kill Los Angeles attorney Paul Morantz by planting a rattlesnake in his mailbox. Morantz survived being bitten, and in an October 19, 1978, article, Mitchell revealed that Synanon founder Charles Dederich had been calling for an attack on Morantz, who three weeks earlier had won a $300,000 judgment against the cult.

Dederich and followers Lance Kenton and Joe Musico were arrested and in July 1980 pleaded no contest to charges of conspiracy to commit murder.

An unnamed member of the Pulitzer board told Los Angeles Times reporter David Shaw, “The job that couple [the Mitchells] did was damn good, but the guts they showed with Synanon just a few miles down the road… That’s what the Pulitzers are all about, that’s what won the award.”

Working with his wife, Cathy Mitchell, and University of California at Berkeley sociologist Richard Ofshe (an unpaid consultant for the Synanon investigation), Mitchell subsequently wrote The Light on Synanon: How a Country Weekly Exposed a Corporate Cult and won the Pulitzer Prize.

The book was published in 1980 by Seaview Books, then a wholly owned division of Playboy, and was made into a two-hour movie for CBS, Attack on Fear.

Lawyers for Synanon responded to the exposé by filing six libel suits against the Mitchells. The Mitchells received a pro bono defense from Heller Ehrman White and McAuliffe, which in representing them won a significant victory for the state's press. In its 1984 decision, the California Supreme Court ruled that reporters could often keep confidential sources secret in libel and other civil cases without forfeiting their defense.

The cult settled the litigation it had instigated by paying the Mitchells $100,000 in the form of two $50,000 checks, and Mitchell published a photo of the checks on The Light's front page.

== Post-Pulitzer Prize ==
David and Cathy Mitchell divorced in 1981, selling The Light to Rosalie Laird and her short-term partner Ace Ramos.

David Mitchell spent two years reporting for the then-Hearst-owned San Francisco Examiner. In 1982, The Examiner sent Mitchell to Central America for three months as part of a news team reporting on upheaval in the region. Mitchell was assigned to the insurrections in El Salvador and Guatemala.

In 1983, Mitchell, working as a freelancer for The Examiner, returned to Central America during his vacation, with his fiancée Cynthia Clark serving as his translator.

In El Salvador, Mitchell and Clark observed cooperation between government phone workers and guerrillas, and they were caught in a firefight between guerrillas and government forces.

On December 31, 1983, Mitchell reacquired The Point Reyes Light through a default action against Rosalie Laird. He and Clark were married in June 1984. Mitchell and Clark separated in 1995 and subsequently divorced.

In 2003, Mitchell married for a fourth time. His wife, Ana Carolina Monterroso, was a Guatemalan he had met while working in Central America. The marriage lasted only a few months.

During Mitchell's 27 years of publishing The Point Reyes Light, the small paper won 108 state, regional, and national journalism awards, as well as the Pulitzer Prize. In a July 4, 1989, report on the US First Amendment, Germany's ARD network reported, “America’s small newspapers top the list of things US citizens can take pride in, and among America’s best small papers is The Point Reyes Light.”

After Mitchell's return to The Light, the paper's longest-running story was a series on five historic waves of immigration to Point Reyes in the previous 150 years. One purpose of the series was to put in perspective an ongoing immigration from Jalostotitlán, Mexico. Despite being a small-town weekly with only about 4,000 circulation, The Light sent reporters abroad four times in 13 years to interview relatives of Point Reyes’ immigrant families to learn why some members left the old country and some did not.

Mitchell married long-time partner Lynn Axelrod Mitchell in 2018.

== Awards ==
During Mitchell's 27 years of publishing The Point Reyes Light, the small paper won 108 state, regional, and national journalism awards, as well as the Pulitzer Prize. In 2006 after his retirement, Mitchell received the James Madison Freedom of Information Award for career achievement from the Northern California Chapter of the Society of Professional Journalists. [**2] In 2014, the International Society of Weekly Newspaper Editors representing journalists in the United States, Canada, England, Ireland, Scotland, South Africa, and Australia gave him its highest honor for career achievement as the editor of a weekly, the Eugene Cervi Award.

In November 2005, Mitchell sold the weekly to Robert Israel Plotkin of Bolinas, California.

== Post sale of The Light ==
After the sale, Mitchell initially worked as a consultant to The Light, but he and Plotkin soon got into litigation with each other over a variety of issues. The dispute began with Plotkin in February 2006 accusing Mitchell of attacking him in front of The Light’s office. Mitchell was not charged with any wrongdoing and on his blog cited statements the witnesses had made to Marin County sheriff's deputies. All said that neither man had been violent but had merely shouted at each other. In court filings Mitchell claimed that Plotkin was trying to break a consulting contract.

In January 2008, the two men announced they had reached an out-of-court settlement to all their litigation. Both said they were happy with the agreement but had agreed to keep details private.

In November 2013, Tomales Regional History Center published a book written by him with Jacoba Charles as coauthor, The Light on the Coast: 65 Years of News Big and Small as Reported in The Point Reyes Light.

Mitchell died at his Point Reyes Station home on October 26, 2023, of complications from Parkinson's disease.

== Books ==
- The Light on Synanon: How a Country Weekly Exposed a Corporate Cult and Won the Pulitzer Prize Seaview Books, 1980. ISBN 0-87223-761-3
- Pulitzer’s Gold: Behind the Prize for Public Service Journalism University of Missouri Press, 2007. ISBN 0-8262-1768-0
- The Light on the Coast: 65 Years of News Big and Small As Reported in The Point Reyes Light Tomales Regional History Center, 2013. ISBN 978-0-615-91662-0
