= Stranger at My Door (1991 film) =

- Genre: Drama; Thriller
- Written by: Peter S. Fischer
- Directed by: Vincent McEveety
- Starring: Robert Urich; Markie Post; Michael Beck; Ken Swofford; James Gammon
- Music by: David Bell
- Country of origin: United States
- Original language: English

Production
- Producer: Kevin G. Cremin
- Production location: Austin, Texas
- Cinematography: Fred Murphy
- Editor: John C. Horger
- Running time: 100 minutes
- Production companies: Carlton America; Dry Canyon; Gold Creek Films

Original release
- Network: CBS
- Release: September 27, 1991

Stranger at My Door (also known as Dead Run) is a 1991 American made-for-television thriller drama film directed by Vincent McEveety and starring Robert Urich.

== Premise ==
A rich city woman and murder witness on the run from her psychotic husband takes refuge in the barn of a Texas dirt farmer. The farmer is also on the run from the law and has been for years and finally must confront the police when they come for the woman.

== Cast ==
- Robert Urich as Joe Fortier
- Markie Post as Sharon Dancey
- James Gammon as Sheriff Bitterman
- Michael Beck as Jimmy Lee Dancey
- Helen Griffiths as Laverne
- Nick Stahl as Robert Fortier
- Ken Swofford as Lieutenant McIvers
