= Levinson & Link =

American television producers and writers

Richard Levinson and William Link were American television writers and producers who collaborated for 43 years, until Levinson's death. They wrote for the CBS anthology drama The DuPont Show with June Allyson, and they created classic television detective series such as Columbo; Mannix; Ellery Queen; and Murder, She Wrote; and made-for-TV movies including The Gun, My Sweet Charlie, That Certain Summer, The Judge and Jake Wyler, The Execution of Private Slovik, Charlie Cobb: A Nice Night for a Hanging, Murder by Natural Causes, Rehearsal for Murder, and Guilty Conscience. They also collaborated on two feature films: The Hindenburg (1975) and Rollercoaster (1977).

Levinson and Link occasionally used the pseudonym "Ted Leighton", most notably on the telefilm Ellery Queen: Don't Look Behind You, where their work was substantially re-written by other hands, and Columbo when they came up with stories to be scripted by their collaborators.

In 1979, Levinson and Link received a Special Edgar Award from the Mystery Writers of America for their work on Ellery Queen and Columbo. During the 1980s, they were three-time winners of the Edgar for Best TV Feature or MiniSeries Teleplay, and in 1989 they were given the Mystery Writers of America's Ellery Queen Award, which honors outstanding mystery writing teams. In November 1995, they were jointly elected to the Television Academy Hall of Fame.

== Credits ==
=== Short stories ===
Collected in 2021 as Shooting Script and Other Mysteries.

- Whistle While You Work, November 1954, Ellery Queen's Mystery Magazine
- Child's Play, January 1959, Alfred Hitchcock's Mystery Magazine
- Shooting Script, April 1959, Alfred Hitchcock's Mystery Magazine
- Suddenly, There Was Mrs. Kemp, April 1959, Alfred Hitchcock's Mystery Magazine
- Operation Staying-Alive, July 1959, Alfred Hitchcock's Mystery Magazine
- Robbery, Robbery, Robbery, August 1959, Alfred Hitchcock's Mystery Magazine
- The Hundred-Dollar Bird's Nest, August 1959, Alfred Hitchcock's Mystery Magazine (writing as Ted Leighton)
- One for the Road, August 1959, Escapade
- One Bad Winter Day, September 1959, Alfred Hitchcock's Mystery Magazine
- Memory Game, September 1959, Alfred Hitchcock's Mystery Magazine) (writing as Ted Leighton)
- The Joan Club, November 1959, Playboy Magazine
- May I Come In? (also titled Dear Corpus Delicti), March 1960, Alfred Hitchcock's Mystery Magazine (served as the basis for the television series Columbo)
- Who is Jessica?, August 1960, Alfred Hitchcock's Mystery Magazine
- No Name, Address, Identity?, July 1961, Alfred Hitchcock's Mystery Magazine
- The End of an Era, January 1962, Alfred Hitchcock's Mystery Magazine
- Top-Flight Aquarium, April 1962, Alfred Hitchcock's Mystery Magazine
- Exit Line, June 1962, Alfred Hitchcock's Mystery Magazine
- The Man in the Lobby, June 1966, Alfred Hitchcock's Mystery Magazine

=== Screen ===
Year	Title	Creator	Producer/Executive Producer	Writer	Notes
1959	Westinghouse Desilu Playhouse	No	No	Yes	Episode: "Chain of Command"
1959	General Motors Presents	No	No	Yes	2 episodes
1959-1960	Johnny Ringo	No	No	Yes	3 episodes
1959	Black Saddle	No	No	Yes	Episode: "The Deal"
1959	The DuPont Show with June Allyson	No	No	Yes	Episode: "The Crossing"
1959	The Rebel	No	No	Yes	Episode: "Gun City"
1960	Richard Diamond, Private Detective	No	No	Yes	Episode: "Seven Swords"
1960	The Chevy Mystery Show	No	No	Yes	Episode: "Enough Rope"
1960-1961	Michael Shayne	No	No	Yes	6 episodes
1961	The Brothers Brannagan	No	No	Yes	Episode: "Mistaken Identity"
1961-1962	Adventures in Paradise	No	No	Yes	2 episodes
1961-1962	Alfred Hitchcock Presents	No	No	Yes	2 episodes
1962-1964	The Alfred Hitchcock Hour	No	No	Yes	5 episodes
1963	Stoney Burke	No	No	Yes	Episode: "A Matter of Percentage"
1963	The Third Man	No	No	Yes	2 episodes
1963	Dr. Kildare	No	No	Yes	2 episodes
1964	Arrest and Trial	No	No	Yes	Episode: "The Best There Is"
1964	The Rogues	No	No	Yes	Episode: "The Boston Money Party"
1964-1965	Burke's Law	No	No	Yes	3 episodes
1964-1965	The Fugitive	No	No	Yes	2 episodes
1965-1966	Honey West	No	No	Yes	4 episodes
1966-1967	Jericho	Yes	No	No	Created with Merwin A. Bloch
1967-1975	Mannix	Yes	No	No	
1968	Prescription: Murder	No	No	Yes	Television film; backdoor pilot for Columbo
1968	Istanbul Express	No	No	Yes	Television film
1968	The Name of the Game	No	No	Yes	2 episodes
1969	Trial Run	No	No	Yes	Television film
1969	The Whole World Is Watching	No	No	Yes	Television film
1970	My Sweet Charlie	No	Yes	Yes	Television film
1970	McCloud	No	No	Yes	Episode: "Portrait of a Dead Girl"
1970	San Francisco International Airport	No	No	Yes	Episode: "Crisis"
1970	The Psychiatrist	No	No	Yes	Episode: "God Bless the Children"
1971	Who Killed the Mysterious Mr. Foster?	No	No	Yes	Television film
1971	Ransom for a Dead Man	No	No	Yes	Television film; second Columbo pilot
1971-2003	Columbo	Yes	Yes	Yes	Series continued after Levinson's death
1971	Two on a Bench	No	Yes	Yes	Television film
1971	Ellery Queen: Don't Look Behind You	No	No	Yes	Television film; credited as "Ted Leighton"
1972	That Certain Summer	No	Yes	Yes	Television film
1972	The Judge and Jake Wyler	No	Yes	Yes	Television film
1973	Tenafly	Yes	Yes	Yes	
1973	Savage	No	Yes	Yes	Television film
1974	The Execution of Private Slovik	No	Yes	Yes	Television film
1974	The Gun	No	Yes	Yes	Television film
1975	The Hindenburg	No	No	Yes	Theatrical film
1975-1976	Ellery Queen	Yes	Yes	Yes	
1977	Charlie Cobb: Nice Night for a Hanging	No	Yes	Yes	Television film
1977	Rollercoaster	No	No	Yes	Theatrical film
1977	The Storyteller	No	Yes	Yes	Television film
1979	Murder by Natural Causes	No	Yes	Yes	Television film
1979-1980	Stone	Yes	No	Yes	Created with Stephen J. Cannell
1981	Crisis at Central High	No	Yes	Yes	Television film
1982	Darkroom	No	No	Yes	Episode: "Exit Line"
1982	Rehearsal for Murder	No	Yes	Yes	Television film
1982	Take Your Best Shot	No	Yes	Yes	Television film
1983	Prototype	No	Yes	Yes	Television film
1984-1996	Murder, She Wrote	Yes	Yes	Yes	Created with Peter S. Fischer, series continued after Levinson's death
1984	The Guardian	No	Yes	Yes	Television film
1985	Guilty Conscience	No	Yes	Yes	Television film
1986	Vanishing Act	No	Yes	Yes	Television film
1986	Blacke's Magic	Yes	No	Yes	Created with Peter S. Fischer
1987	Hard Copy	Yes	No	Yes	Created with Daniel Pyne, only Link produced
1988	Terrorist on Trial: The United States vs. Salim Ajami	No	Yes	Yes	Television film

== See also ==
- Richard Levinson
- William Link
