= Rosanna Huffman =

American actress (1938–2016)

- Born: August 12, 1938; Timblin, Pennsylvania, U.S.
- Died: May 20, 2016 (aged 77); Santa Monica, California, U.S.
- Occupations: Actress, voiceover artist
- Spouse: Richard Levinson (m. 1969; died 1987)

Rosanna Huffman (August 12, 1938 – May 20, 2016) was an American actress and voice-over artist. Huffman's film credits as a voice actress included Oliver & Company in 1988, The Fabulous Baker Boys in 1989, FernGully: The Last Rainforest in 1992, and Babe in 1995. She also appeared in recurring roles in Murder, She Wrote, Hill Street Blues, and Murder One. Huffman was the widow of Richard Levinson, the co-creator of Columbo and Murder, She Wrote, who died of a heart attack in 1987.

Huffman was born to Doras and Christine Huffman on August 12, 1938, in Timblin, Pennsylvania, a small coal mining town. She moved to New York in the 1960s and was quickly cast in a lead role in the 1965 Broadway production of Half a Sixpence.

She met Richard Levinson while attending a party. The couple married in 1969 and moved to Los Angeles, where Huffman soon won a lead role in a musical comedy, Jane Heights. Later, during the 1970s, she guest-starred in two episodes of Columbo, including the episode "Suitable for Framing" (1971) in which she was cast as the partner of a murderous art critic portrayed by Ross Martin, whose character later murders hers. Huffman also appeared in seven episodes of Murder, She Wrote, another series created by Levinson over the course of a decade. Additionally, she was cast in a recurring role on Hill Street Blues, playing the former wife of Joe Spano's character, Lt. Henry Goldblume. Her other television credits, spanning from the 1960s to the 2000s, include the series The Big Valley, Mission: Impossible, Ellery Queen, The Streets of San Francisco, Barnaby Jones, The Golden Girls, Family Ties, Cagney & Lacey, Tucker's Witch, and ER.

Huffman died from pancreatic cancer at her home in Santa Monica, California, on May 20, 2016, at age 77.

== Filmography ==
=== Film ===
Year	Title	Role	Notes
1972	Bone	Secretary	
1980	Seems Like Old Times	Court Clerk	
1985	Starchaser: The Legend of Orin		Voice
1986	The Ladies Club	Rona	
1988	Oliver & Company		Voice
1989	The Fabulous Baker Boys		Voice
1990	White Palace		Voice
1992	FernGully: The Last Rainforest		Voice
1992	The Distinguished Gentleman	Mrs. Bridges	
1995	Babe	Sheep	Voice
1995	Cops n Roberts		
1996	The Trigger Effect	Arguing Customer	
1998	Sour Grapes	Mr. Bell's Assistant	

=== Television ===
Year	Title	Role	Notes
1967	The Big Valley	Martha	Season 2 Episode 17: ”Image of Yesterday”
1967	The Felony Squad	Nurse	Season 2 Episode 8: ”Hit and Run, Run, Run”
1969	Insight	Mariana	Season 1 Episode 308: ”Tuesday Night Is the Loneliest Night of the Week”
1969	Then Came Bronson	Betty	Season 1 Episode 15: ”Sybil”
1970	Mission: Impossible	Guide	Season 5 Episode 8: ”Decoy”
1971	Love, American Style	The Maid of Honor	Season 2 Episode 17: ”segment: Love and the Serious Wedding”
1971	Sarge	Widow	Season 1 Episode 6: ”John Michael O'Flaherty Presents the Eleven O'Clock War”
1971	Columbo	Tracy O’Connor	Season 1 Episode 4: ”Suitable for Framing”
1972	The Judge and Jake Wyler	Hospital Receptionist	TV Movie
1973	Owen Marshall, Counselor at Law	Stella Wickley	Season 2 Episode 20: ”They've Got to Blame Somebody”
1973	Tenafly	Lorrie	3 episodes
1973	Griff	Ellie Dixon	Season 1 Episode 8: "Elephant in a Cage"
1975	The Streets of San Francisco	Alice	Season 3 Episode 23: "Solitaire"
1975	Crime Club	Martha	TV Movie
1975–1976	Ellery Queen	Radio Actress / Nancy McGuire	2 episodes
1977	The Feather & Father Gang	Helen	Season 1 Episode 13: "The Judas Bug"
1978	Richie Brockelman, Private Eye	Rena Brockelman	Season 1 Episode 1: "The Framing of Perfect Sydney"
1978	With This Ring	Photographer	TV Movie
1978	The Eddie Capra Mysteries	Judge	Season 1 Episode 9: "The Two Million Dollar Stowaway"
1979	Murder by Natural Causes	Woman in Play	TV Movie
1980	Barnaby Jones	Gwen Kingsley	Season 8 Episode 19: "The Final Victim"
1980	Rape and Marriage: The Rideout Case		TV Movie
1981	Crisis at Central High	Mrs. Farrow	TV Movie
1981	Stand by Your Man	Mrs. Hadley	TV Movie
1981–1984	Hill Street Blues	Rachel Goldblume	4 episodes
1982	Victims		TV Movie
1982	Teachers Only	Evelyn Helmsley	Season 1 Episode 4: "Quote, Unquote"
1982	Tucker's Witch	Diane Barringer	Season 1 Episode 1: "The Good Witch of Laurel Canyon"
1982	Take Your Best Shot	Gail	TV Movie
1983	Wait Till Your Mother Gets Home!		TV Movie
1983	The Other Woman	Minister	TV Movie
1983	Dempsey	Woman at door	TV Movie
1983	The Day After	Dr. Wallenberg	TV Movie
1983	The Awakening of Candra	Sara	TV Movie
1984	Passions	Maggie	TV Movie
1984–1994	Murder, She Wrote	Eleanor Thompson / Connie Miles / Helen Stully / Dora Manchester / Miriam Harwood / Marge Brickman / Nell Carson	7 episodes
1985	A Reason to Live	Felicia Massey	TV Movie
1985	Cover Up	ICU Nurse	Season 1 Episode 12: "Murder Offshore"
1985	Too Close for Comfort	Miss Fettison	Season 5 Episode 3: "My Son, the PhD"
1985	Scene of the Crime	Ellen	Season 1 Episode 4: "segment: The Medium is the Murder"
1986	Moonlighting	Woman in Room 458	Season 2 Episode 14: "Every Daughter's Father Is a Virgin"
1986	Crossings	Mrs. Freilich Hillman	Miniseries (2 episodes)
1986	Triplecross	Museum Receptionist	TV Movie
1986	North and South – Book II: Love and War	Mrs. Reilly	Miniseries (Episode 1)
1986	Kate's Secret	Megan	TV Movie
1987	The Golden Girls	Stephanie	Season 2 Episode 15: "Before and After"
1987	The Wizard	Mrs. Curtis	Season 1 Episode 15: "Daydream Believer"
1987	Harry's Hong Kong	Mrs. Hamilton	TV Movie
1987	Mistress	Female Agent	TV Movie
1988	Family Ties	Alice	Season 6 Episode 17: "The Play's the Thing"
1988	Cagney & Lacey	Anne	Season 7 Episode 18: "Amends"
1988	I Saw What You Did	Mrs. Harris	TV Movie
1989	The Case of the Hillside Stranglers	Woman at Bus Stop	TV Movie
1989	Guts and Glory: The Rise and Fall of Oliver North	Nun	Miniseries
1989	Nick Knight	Reporter #1	TV Movie
1990	Columbo: Rest in Peace, Mrs. Columbo	Mrs. Thornwood	TV Movie
1990	In the Best Interest of the Child	Mrs. Thacker	TV Movie
1990	Sisters	Mother	TV Movie
1991	Aftermath: A Test of Love	Leah	TV Movie
1991	The Boys	Carolyn	TV Movie
1991	Brooklyn Bridge	Lady	Season 1 Episode 10: ”Get a Job”
1992	Drive Like Lightning		TV Movie
1992	Honor Thy Mother	Psychiatrist	TV Movie
1993	Barbarians at the Gate	Juanita Kreps	TV Movie
1993	Empty Cradle	Dr. Genser	TV Movie
1993	Hart to Hart Returns	Marcia Lassiter	TV Movie
1994	Cries Unheard: The Donna Yaklich Story	Lenore Walker	TV Movie
1994	Menendez: A Killing in Beverly Hills	Lyle’s Jury: Juror #1	TV Movie
1995	My Brother’s Keeper	Loretta	TV Movie
1996	Murder One	Eleanor Iverson	11 episodes (Recurring role)
1996	Champs	Woman in restaurant	Season 1 Episode 6: "Live and Let Breathe"
1996	The Burning Zone	Passenger	Season 1 Episode 5: "Night Flight"
1998	Legalese	Teacher	TV Movie
1999	Night Ride Home	Iris	TV Movie
1999	7th Heaven	Cheryl Carberry	Season 3 Episode 20: "All Dogs Go to Heaven"
2000	ER	Mrs. McNamara	Season 6 Episode 20: "Loose Ends"
