= Prototype (1983 film) =

- Genre: Drama; Sci-Fi
- Written by: Richard Levinson; William Link
- Directed by: David Greene
- Starring: Christopher Plummer; David Morse; Frances Sternhagen
- Theme music composer: Billy Goldenberg
- Country of origin: United States
- Original language: English

Production
- Executive producers: Richard Levinson; William Link
- Producer: Robert Papazian
- Cinematography: Harry J. May
- Editor: Parkie L. Singh
- Running time: 96 min.
- Production companies: Richard Levinson / William Link Productions; Robert Papazian Productions

Original release
- Network: CBS
- Release: December 7, 1983

Prototype is a 1983 television film, starring Christopher Plummer.

== Plot synopsis ==
Just before Christmas, a security guard discovers a top secret project has disappeared from a laboratory. It is an advanced humanoid robot with learning and analytical abilities, developed by a team led by irascible Nobel laureate Dr. Carl Forrester. He has taken the robot – named Michael – out for field testing at a department store then to his own home for dinner to see if the robot can fool his wife, Dorothy. Lab security escort Forrester and Michael back to the lab, to Dorothy’s puzzlement.

Forrester’s associate, Gene Pressman, a scientist with ultra-liberal leanings, is ecstatic about the success of the unscheduled field test but Dr. Jarrett, the administrator of the lab, is furious at Forrester. After a confrontation with Forrester, Jarrett notifies the Pentagon that the prototype is ready for evaluation. When Forrester goes home for the night, military personnel enter the lab and take Michael.

Forrester and Pressman are angry that Jarrett allowed the Pentagon to take Michael. Once Michael returns, the entire team closely examines him to find out what the government did with him. They find that tests included using firearms. The pacifistic Forrester and Pressman believe that the military may intend to use expendable robots like Michael as soldiers or even political assassins. General Keating from the Pentagon assures him that isn’t their intent, but Forrester is unconvinced. He argues that he feels as responsible for the moral implications of his creation as Oppenheimer and Fermi felt for theirs, having testified for the defense himself at Oppenheimer's hearings.

At night, Forrester sneaks Michael out in his car after Pressman distracts the guard at the front desk. Forrester and Michael switch to a car Pressman rented and go on the run. When Forrester calls Dorothy from a payphone, she insists he hang up as Keating and government agents are there and trying to trace the call.

Forrester takes Michael to hide at the college campus where he used to teach as a young professor. He rents an off-campus apartment and a garage. Michael interacts with other people on campus as he learns about self-determination, including reading the fate of the creature in Mary Shelley’s Frankenstein novel after having watched most of the 1931 film on TV. Needing more money, Forrester calls Pressman one evening.

The next afternoon, they return to the apartment but the street surroundings seem suspect. Forrester orders Michael to hide in the garage. Inside the apartment, he finds Pressman. Aware that Pressman could not have withdrawn $2000 after business hours, Forrester accuses him of leading the government to him in exchange for a fully-funded research grant that he had long sought. Pressman denies it, claiming concern for Forrester as his only motivation. Forrester proposes a meeting at a nearby coffee shop if Pressman will lead the agents away as a gesture of trustworthiness.

Forrester meets Michael in the garage and is resigned to having to surrender him to the government. Michael decides he wants to be in control of his own fate and proposes self-immolation using flammable liquids stored in the garage. Forrester is aghast at the idea but finally agrees that it’s the only way to keep Michael out of the government’s hands until he can incorporate appropriate safeguards in the next prototype. They say their farewells and Pressman, Jarrett and Keating watch Forrester stumble numb and grief-stricken into the coffee shop to meet them as fire engines respond to the blaze at the garage.

== Cast ==
- Christopher Plummer as Dr. Carl Forrester
- David Morse as Michael
- Frances Sternhagen as Dorothy Forrester
- James Sutorius as Dr. Gene Pressman
- Stephen Elliott as Dr. Arthur Jarrett
- Doran Clark as Chris
- Alley Mills as Dr. Rebecca Bishop
- Arthur Hill as Gen. Keating
- Ed Call as Security guard
- Jonathan Estrin as Dr. Cooper
- Richard Kuss as Harris
- Pat McNamara as Landlord
- Vahan Moosekian as Dr. Kirk
- Molly Hansen as Elizabeth Hammond Ph.D. (uncredited)

== Production ==
Filmed as a made for TV movie airing on the CBS network.

Exteriors and most interiors of the research facility were filmed in the Hillside Campus "bridge building" of the ArtCenter College of Design in Pasadena, California.

== Reception ==
The New York Times praised the movie, citing the acting, script and directing as strong points, finding the movie "uncommonly riveting " Creature Features gave the movie 3.5 out of 5 stars, saying the movie was intelligent, well-acted and praised that it tried to address both sides of the issue.
