= Hard Copy (American TV series) =

- Created by: Daniel Pyne; Richard Levinson & William Link
- Developed by: Dan Cooke
- Starring: Michael Murphy; Wendy Crewson; Dean Devlin
- Composer: David Mansfield
- Country of origin: United States
- Original language: English
- No. of seasons: 1
- No. of episodes: 11

Production
- Running time: 60 minutes
- Production company: Universal Television

Original release
- Network: CBS
- Release: January 25 – July 2, 1987

Hard Copy is an American dramatic television series starring Michael Murphy that aired on CBS from January 25 to July 2, 1987.

Hard Copy was the lead-out program for CBS following Super Bowl XXI. It was the last series created by the writing-producing team of Levinson & Link.

== Plot ==
The series centered around the staff of the Los Angeles based newspaper "The Morning Post" led by veteran reporter Andy Omart.

== Cast ==
- Michael Murphy as Andy Omart
- Dean Devlin as David Del Valle
- Wendy Crewson as Blake Calisher
- E. Erich Anderson as Det. Parker
- Charles Cooper as William Boot
- Fionnula Flanagan as Lt. Guyla Cook

== Episodes ==
No.	Title	Original release date
1	"Pilot"	January 25, 1987
2	"Someday We'll All"	February 1, 1987
3	"The Trouble with Kids Today"	February 8, 1987
4	"Long Day's Journey"	February 15, 1987
5	"A Combination Plate"	February 22, 1987
6	"A Rumor with a View"	May 29, 1987
7	"Some Days You're Lucky"	June 5, 1987
8	"Fine Kettle of Fish"	June 12, 1987
9	"Down in Del Valle"	June 19, 1987
10	TBA	June 26, 1987
11	TBA	July 2, 1987
