= Edward M. Abroms =

American film editor and TV director (1935–2018)

- Born: May 6, 1935; Hollywood, Los Angeles, U.S.
- Died: February 13, 2018 (aged 82); Los Angeles, U.S.
- Occupations: Film editor and TV director

Edward M. Abroms (May 6, 1935 – February 13, 2018) was an American film editor and TV director.

Abroms was born and raised in Hollywood, Los Angeles. He studied film at the University of Southern California before dropping out to go to work at Republic Studios.

Abroms was nominated at the 56th Academy Awards for his work on the film Blue Thunder in the category of Academy Award for Best Film Editing, his nomination was shared with Frank Morriss.

Abroms worked with American film director Steven Spielberg on Night Gallery and The Sugarland Express and was bestowed the American Cinema Editors Career Achievement Award in 2006.

Abroms received Primetime Emmy Awards for editing the My Sweet Charlie World Premiere in 1970 and the Columbo NBC Mystery Movie in 1972 He shared the 2006 American Cinema Editors Career Achievement Award. He also directed for the 1978-1979 NBC television series The Eddie Capra Mysteries.

On February 13, 2018, Abroms died of heart failure in Los Angeles, California. He was 82.

Abroms also worked as an editor in Sam Peckinpah’s suspense thriller film The Osterman Weekend (1983).

== Career ==
Abroms had joined Review Productions (present Universal Studios) as an apprentice editor after a short stint at Technicolor. He later got an opportunity to edit the 1966 episode of NBC's Tarzan, which had featured Ron Ely. He earned his first Emmy Award for the 1970 NBC telefilm My Sweet Charlie, directed by Lamont Johnson and starring Patty Duke.

== Personal life ==
Abroms married Colleen, with whom he had three children.

== Selected filmography ==
Editor
Year	Film	Director	Notes	Ref.
1970	Tarzan's Deadly Silence	Robert L. Friend		
1972	The Groundstar Conspiracy	Lamont Johnson	First collaboration with Lamont Johnson	
1972	You'll Like My Mother	Lamont Johnson	Second collaboration with Lamont Johnson	
1974	The Sugarland Express	Steven Spielberg		
1983	Blue Thunder	John Badham		
1983	The Osterman Weekend	Sam Peckinpah		
1987	Cherry 2000	Steve De Jarnatt		
1988	Plain Clothes	Martha Coolidge		
1988	Cohen and Tate	Eric Red		
1994	Street Fighter	Steven E. de Souza		
1997	T.N.T.	Robert Radler		

Editorial department
Year	Film	Director	Role
1985	The Jewel of the Nile	Lewis Teague	Additional editor

TV movies

Editor
Year	Film	Director
1969	Night Gallery	Boris Sagal; Steven Spielberg; Barry Shear
1970	My Sweet Charlie	Lamont Johnson
1970	Dial Hot Line	Jerry Thorpe
1970	Berlin Affair	David Lowell Rich
1971	Ransom for a Dead Man	Richard Irving
1971	Lock, Stock and Barrel	Jerry Thorpe
1971	The Impatient Heart	John Badham
1972	That Certain Summer	Lamont Johnson
1973	Savage	Steven Spielberg
1979	Diary of a Teenage Hitchhiker	Ted Post
1981	The Patricia Neal Story	Anthony Harvey; Anthony Page
1984	The Guardian	David Greene
1986	Florida Straits	Mike Hodges
1988	Glory Days	Robert Conrad
1989	Nightlife	Daniel Taplitz
1990	Columbo: Rest in Peace, Mrs. Columbo	Vincent McEveety
1990	Crash: The Mystery of Flight 1501	Philip Saville
1991	Aftermath: A Test of Love	Glenn Jordan
1991	Payoff	Stuart Cooper
1991	One Special Victory	Stuart Cooper
1992	Grave Secrets: The Legacy of Hilltop Drive	John Patterson
1993	Taking the Heat	Tom Mankiewicz

Editorial department
Year	Film	Director	Role
1982	The Executioner's Song	Lawrence Schiller	Editorial consultant

Director
Year	Film
1975	The Impostor
1978	The Case of the Baltimore Girls
1978	The $100,000 Bill
1980	The Sultan and the Rock Star

Producer
Year	Film	Director	Credit
1991	One Special Victory	Stuart Cooper	Associate producer

TV series

Editor
Year	Title	Notes	Ref.
1968	Untamed World	1 episode	
1966−68	Tarzan	14 episodes	
1968−69	Ironside	4 episodes	
1969	The Bold Ones: The Protectors	1 episode	
1969	Night Gallery	1 episode	
1970	It Takes a Thief	1 episode	
1970	The Virginian	1 episode	
1971	Columbo	2 episodes	
1975	Ellery Queen	2 episodes	
1987	Jake and the Fatman	1 episode	

Director
Year	Title	Notes
1972	Alias Smith and Jones	1 episode
1973	Night Gallery	1 episode
1973	McMillan & Wife	1 episode
1973	Griff	2 episodes
1972−73	Columbo	2 episodes
1974	Doc Elliot	1 episode
1974	The Rookies	1 episode
1974	Get Christie Love!	1 episode
1975	Apple's Way	1 episode
1975	Archer	1 episode
1975	Cannon	1 episode
1973−75	Police Story	2 episodes
1975−76	Doctors' Hospital	4 episodes
1976	Ellery Queen	1 episode
1976	Switch	2 episodes
1977	The Feather & Father Gang	1 episode
1977	CHiPs	1 episode
1977	Man from Atlantis	1 episode
1977	The Six Million Dollar Man	2 episodes
1976−78	Kojak	4 episodes
1978	The Hardy Boys/Nancy Drew Mysteries	1 episode
1978	ABC Weekend Special	1 episode
1978	The Eddie Capra Mysteries	2 episodes
1978−79	David Cassidy: Man Undercover	2 episodes
1979	Mrs. Columbo	1 episode
1979	Hawaii Five-O	1 episode
1979	Salvage 1	2 episodes
1979	Doctors' Private Lives	4 episodes
1980	The Chisholms	2 episodes
1980	Disney's Wonderful World	1 episode
1981	Nero Wolfe	3 episodes
1985	Murder, She Wrote	1 episode
