= Burton Miller =

American costume designer (1926–1982)

- Born: January 17, 1926; Pittsburgh, Pennsylvania, U.S.
- Died: March 5, 1982 (aged 56); Los Angeles, California, U.S.
- Occupation: Costume designer
- Years active: 1961–1983 (Last film released posthumously)

Burton Jay Miller (January 17, 1926 – March 5, 1982) was an American costume and fashion designer. A native of Pittsburgh, Pennsylvania, he was educated at the Carnegie Institute of Technology (now Carnegie Mellon University) and the Parsons School of Design. He began his career as a dress designer in Manhattan with the actress and singer Lisa Kirk being his first celebrity client. He also designed ready-to-wear clothes for American department stores in the 1950s. He created dresses for many entertainers, first in New York, and then in Hollywood where he relocated in 1956. From 1961 until his death in 1982 he worked as a costume designer for Universal Studios; designing clothes for both American film and television. He was nominated for the Academy Award for Best Costume Design at the 50th Academy Awards for Airport '77. He was the first costume designer elected to the governing board of the Academy of Motion Picture Arts and Sciences, and also was elected six times to the governing board of the Costume Designers Guild.

== Early life and career ==
The son of A. Louis Miller and his wife Ethel Miller, Burton Jay Miller was born on January 17, 1926, in the Oakland neighborhood of Pittsburgh, Pennsylvania. He had two sisters, Edith and Marion. His father owned a large car dealership in Pittsburgh, and died in 1965. He graduated from Taylor Allderdice High School in his native city, and then attended the Carnegie Institute of Technology (CIT). He was a drama major at CIT, and graduated from that institution in 1949.

Miller continued his education at The New School's Parsons School of Design in New York City from which he also earned a degree. In Manhattan he began his career as a designer of dresses. He befriended the actress and singer Lisa Kirk and it is for her that he made his first professional designs. Kirk was engaged as a nightclub performer at the Plaza Hotel and Miller designed all of her outfits for her act when it opened there in December 1949. He continued to design regularly for Kirk in the 1950s; also designing dresses while based in New York for other celebrities like singers Eileen Wilson Patrice Munsel, Marguerite Piazza, and Monica Lewis; and actresses Zsa Zsa Gabor Viveca Lindfors, Kaye Ballard, Jaye P. Morgan, and Dagmar. He also designed ready-to-wear fashions carried nationally by American department stores. Some of the stores that carried his designs included Saks Fifth Avenue, Neiman Marcus, and Bonwit Teller.

In 1950 Miller passed his licensing exam for costume design with New York's Designers Union Board. When Carol Channing replaced Rosalind Russell as Ruth Sherwood in the original Broadway production of Wonderful Town in 1954, Miller was hired to design new costumes for Channing in this part. That same year he designed costumes for regional theatre productions of Bell, Book and Candle, Kiss Me, Kate, and Panama Hattie.

== Career in California ==
Miller moved to Los Angeles, California in the summer of 1956; initially traveling there to do the interior design for the new home of Hollywood producer Jennings Lang and his new bride, Miller's friend and faithful client the singer Monica Lewis. He quickly picked up additional work designing dresses for Ginger Rogers, and ultimately decided to remain in Hollywood. He initially worked there as a dress designer for celebrities like Joan Fontaine, Barbara Stanwyck, Hope Lange, Carroll Baker, Dana Wynter, and Gisele MacKenzie among others.

In 1961 Miller signed a contract with Revue Studios, a subsidiary of Universal Studios, to work for them as an exclusive costume designer with his early designs for that organization being for the CBS television programs Checkmate, The Investigators, and Thriller. He worked as a costume designer for Universal until his death 21 years later. After several initial years working exclusively in the medium of television, he created his first costumes for the big screen for the 1964 feature Kitten with a Whip starring Ann-Margret.

From this point, Miller divided his time at Universal between television and film. He worked as a costume designer on the TV shows Alfred Hitchcock Presents, Wagon Train, The Virginian, Bob Hope Presents the Chrysler Theatre, It Takes a Thief, The Six Million Dollar Man, McCloud, Columbo, McMillan & Wife, Fay, Switch, and The Betty White Show. He designed costumes for the television films Night Gallery (1969, the Eyes segment directed by Steven Spielberg), The Judge and Jake Wyler (1972), Scream, Pretty Peggy (1973), Evening in Byzantium (1978) The Gossip Columnist (1980), Condominium (1980), Hellinger's Law (1981), The Marva Collins Story (1981), and Madame X (1981), He also designed costumes for the mini-series The Immigrants (1978), and was frequently employed as a designer for television specials using the revue format. In 1970 and 1975 he won Fashion Foundation Awards for his work in television costume design.

In film Miller had success with designs for disaster drama films like Earthquake (1974), Airport '77 (1977), and The Concorde ... Airport '79 (1979). For Airport '77 he received a nomination for the Academy Award for Best Costume Design. He shared his nomination with his co-designer Edith Head at the 50th Academy Awards. Some of the other films he designed costumes for included Counterpoint (1968), The Sugarland Express (1974), Newman's Law (1974), The Front Page (1974), Swashbuckler (1976), Rollercoaster (1977), Damien: Omen II (1978), House Calls (1978), The Nude Bomb (1980), and Visiting Hours (1982).

In addition to his work in television and film, Miller also occasionally designed costumes for stage productions in the Los Angeles area. In 1975 he designed the costumes for the Westwood Playhouse's inaugural production in which it presented The Little Foxes starring Lee Grant and Carroll O'Connor.

Miller continued to work as a personal fashion designer for celebrities while working for Universal. He designed clothing for Cicely Tyson, Jayne Mansfield, Bette Davis, Maureen O'Sullivan, and Shirley Jones among other clients. He was a member of both the Screen Actors Guild and the Academy of Motion Picture Arts and Sciences (AMPAS). In 1975 he became the first costume designer elected to the board of governors of the AMPAS; holding the post on the board which represented art directors. He was elected six times to the governing board of the Costume Designers Guild.

== Personal life and death ==
While not out publicly, Miller was known to be gay by his friends. In 1977 he was guest speaker at his alma mater, which by that time had been renamed Carnegie Mellon University.

Miller died on March 5, 1982, in Los Angeles at the age of 56. The cause of death was a heart attack resulting from an aneurysm that had formed a clot in his leg which then traveled to his heart. He had just completed the costume designs for The Sting II shortly before his death, and was at that time co-chair of the rules committee for the Academy Award for Best Costume Design.

At the request of his mother, Miller's body was transported back to Pittsburgh for burial. He is buried at the Beth Shalom Cemetery in Pittsburgh. The actor Robert Wagner, a friend of Miller, paid for a memorial service in Los Angeles.
