= Savage (1973 TV film) =

- Title card
- Genre: Drama; Thriller
- Written by: Mark Rodgers; William Link; Richard Levinson
- Directed by: Steven Spielberg
- Starring: Martin Landau; Barbara Bain; Will Geer; Paul Richards; Michele Carey
- Music by: Gil Melle
- Country of origin: United States
- Original language: English

Production
- Executive producers: Richard Levinson; William Link
- Producer: Paul Mason
- Production locations: Los Angeles, California; Universal Studios - 100 Universal City Plaza, Universal City, California
- Cinematography: Bill Butler
- Editors: Edward M. Abroms; Steven Spielberg
- Running time: 73 minutes
- Production company: Universal Television

Original release
- Network: NBC
- Release: March 31, 1973

Savage is a 1973 American thriller-drama television pilot directed by Steven Spielberg and starring Martin Landau. It was not picked up as a series and has been referred to as a standalone made-for-television film.

== Premise ==
A TV reporter investigates a compromising photograph of a nominee to the Supreme Court after the woman in the photograph mysteriously dies.

== Cast ==
- Martin Landau as Paul Savage
- Barbara Bain as Gail Abbott
- Will Geer as Joel Ryker
- Paul Richards as Peter Brooks
- Michele Carey as Allison Baker
- Barry Sullivan as Judge Daniel Stern
- Louise Latham as Marian Stern
- Susan Howard as Lee Reynolds
- Dabney Coleman as Ted Seligson
- Pat Harrington Jr. as Russell
- Jack Bender as Jerry
- Victor Millan as Director

== Background ==
Spielberg didn't want to direct another TV film, coming off the success of the theatrical release of Duel, and was trying to get his own projects into production. William Link and Richard Levinson were attempting to get their series The Savage Report off the ground as showrunners, and pushed Universal executive Sid Sheinberg to assign Spielberg the pilot. Link later said Spielberg didn't like the script, and that after a meeting with Sheinberg where Spielberg was pressured into taking on the project, "Steve came back almost in tears. We asked, 'What happened?' We were playing dumb because we had set this up," and went on to say "Steve had made the mistake of saying that he wasn't in the Universal business, he was in the Steven Spielberg business."

Landau thought the show was "ahead of its time" and claimed it did not become a series because of its critique of TV news.

== Filming locations ==
- Los Angeles, California, USA
- Universal Studios - 100 Universal City Plaza, Universal City, California, USA
