= Stone (TV series) =

- Created by: Stephen J. Cannell; Richard Levinson; William Link
- Starring: Dennis Weaver; Pat Hingle; Robby Weaver
- Theme music composer: Nancy Adams; Dennis Weaver
- Composers: Pete Carpenter; Mike Post
- Country of origin: United States
- Original language: English
- No. of seasons: 1
- No. of episodes: 9 (2 unaired)

Production
- Running time: 60 minutes
- Production companies: Stephen J. Cannell Productions; Gerry Productions; Universal Television

Original release
- Network: ABC
- Release: January 14 – March 17, 1980

Stone is an American police drama that aired on ABC on Monday nights from January 14 until March 17, 1980. The series was a Stephen J. Cannell Productions and Gerry Productions, Inc. in association with Universal Television (it was Cannell's last series before he went independent) and was created by Cannell, Richard Levinson and William Link.

== Premise ==
The series focused on Det Sgt. Daniel Stone, a police officer who wrote best-selling novels on police work based on his own experiences (similar to real-life cop-turned-writer Joseph Wambaugh). His superior Chief Paulton, his one-time mentor, was unhappy with Stone's writing but was unable to stop him.

== Cast ==
- Dennis Weaver as Det. Sgt. Daniel Stone
- Pat Hingle as Chief Gene Paulton
- Robby Weaver as Det. Buck Rogers (Note: Roby Weaver is the son of series lead Dennis Weaver)

== Episodes ==
No.	Title	Directed by	Written by	Original release date
0	"Pilot"	Corey Allen	Story by : Stephen J. Cannell and Richard Levinson & William Link; Teleplay by : Stephen J. Cannell	August 26, 1979
1	"Deep Sleeper"	Winrich Kolbe	Don Carlos Dunaway	January 14, 1980
2	"But Can She Type?"	Corey Allen	Juanita Bartlett	January 21, 1980
3	"Case Number HM-89428, Homicide"	Stephen J. Cannell	Stephen J. Cannell	January 28, 1980
4	"The Man in the Full Toledo"	Paul Stanley	Gordon Dawson	February 4, 1980
5	"Just a Little Blow Between Friends"	Corey Allen	Stephen J. Cannell	March 3, 1980
6	"Death Run"	Harry Winer	Donald P. Bellisario	March 10, 1980
7	"67 Hours, 24 Minutes and Counting"	Winrich Kolbe	Story by : Philip DeGuere; Teleplay by : Philip DeGuere & Stephen McPherson	March 17, 1980
8	"The Partner"	Guy Magar	Richard Christian Matheson & Thomas E. Szollosi	Unaired
9	"What Do You People Want from Me?"	Rod Holcomb	Stephen J. Cannell	Unaired
