= Rehearsal for Murder =

- DVD artwork.
- Genre: Drama; Mystery; Thriller
- Written by: Richard Levinson; William Link
- Directed by: David Greene
- Starring: Robert Preston; Lynn Redgrave; Patrick Macnee; Lawrence Pressman; William Russ; Madolyn Smith; Jeff Goldblum; William Daniels
- Music by: Billy Goldenberg
- Country of origin: United States
- Original language: English

Production
- Executive producers: Richard Levinson; William Link
- Producer: Robert A. Papazian
- Cinematography: Stevan Larner
- Editor: Parkie Singh
- Running time: 96 minutes
- Production companies: CBS Productions; A Richard Levinson / William Link Production in association with Robert Papazian Productions, Inc.

Original release
- Network: CBS
- Release: May 26, 1982

Rehearsal for Murder is an American murder mystery television film starring Robert Preston and Lynn Redgrave, and directed by David Greene. The script, written by Richard Levinson and William Link, won a 1983 Edgar Award from the Mystery Writers of America. It originally aired on the CBS Television Network on May 26, 1982.

== Plot ==
=== Television Film ===
When his leading lady (and fiancée) Monica Welles (Redgrave) is found dead from an apparent suicide after the opening night of her Broadway stage debut, playwright Alex Dennison (Preston) is left heartbroken. On the first anniversary of her death, he gathers the cast and crew from that ill-fated night in the same Broadway theater, ostensibly to read a new play he is working on, a mystery in which a famous actress is killed. As the reading progresses, the scenes seem to the cast to be uncomfortably close to actual encounters they might have had with Monica. When pressed, Alex finally reveals that he believes that Monica was murdered and that someone at the theater is her killer.

=== Theatrical Production ===
One year after the supposed suicide of his fiancée (Monica Welles) Alex Dennison invites his friends, some cast and crew from the play one year ago, to read through a new play, Killing Jessica. Along with the cast he invites another actor (Frank Heller) to pose as a police officer (Henry McElroy). During the reading of the scenes, some of the cast become unnerved by Jessica's similarity to the late Monica Welles and the scenes' similarity to reality. After reading a few scenes, the producer (Bella Lamb), director (Lloyd Andrews) and lead (David Matthews) demand to know what Alex's true intentions are, leading him to reveal that the killer of Monica is in the theater. Most of the cast and crew decides on leaving, but with aid of the false police officer and the unintentional aid of the producer (Bella Lamb), they are persuaded to continue. After reading a few more scenes, they start to question Alex's mental state, leading them to leave for the sake of Alex's mental health. However, Alex draws a revolver on his friends, forcing them to stay and keep reading through his scenes. After Alex is convinced that the comic (Leo Gibbs) killed Monica, he draws his revolver once more and fires at Leo with blank cartridges. The lights go out after someone conspiring with Alex pulls the switch. In the ensuing chaos Frank Heller reveals what he knows about Monica's apartment the day she died. Alex's friends reveal that they knew that he was the killer all along, and all they wanted out of him was a confession. Frank reveals that Monica nearly slept with him after a fight with Alex, and so he used that as blackmail to get a large sum of money from Monica. After the meeting went wrong, he unintentionally killed Monica. The real Henry McElroy reveals that he was watching the whole time and comes to arrest Frank. Alex and his friends rejoice that the killer has been brought to justice after all this time. The play ends after his friends leave and Alex toasts with Monica's untouched glass; showing him making peace with this new reality.

== Cast ==
- Robert Preston as Alex Dennison
- Lynn Redgrave as Monica Welles
- Patrick Macnee as David Matthews
- Lawrence Pressman as Lloyd Andrews
- William Russ as Frank Heller
- Madolyn Smith as Karen Daniels
- Jeff Goldblum as Leo Gibbs
- William Daniels as Walter Lamb
- John Finnegan as Damon
- Vahan Moosekian as The Moving Man
- Nicholas Mele as First Officer
- Charlie Robinson as Second Officer
- Sergio Kato as Third Officer
- Wallace Rooney as Ernie
- Buck Young as Lieutenant McElroy

== Stage version ==
In 1983, playwright D.D. Brooke adapted the film for the theatre.

== Home media ==
A DVD transfer of the film was marketed in Australia by Flashback Entertainment (cat no. 8695).
