= Blacke's Magic =

American crime drama television series

- Genre: Crime drama
- Created by: Richard Levinson; William Link
- Developed by: Peter S. Fischer
- Directed by: John Llewellyn Moxey
- Starring: Hal Linden; Harry Morgan
- Theme music composer: David Bell
- Country of origin: United States
- Original language: English
- No. of seasons: 1
- No. of episodes: 13

Production
- Executive producer: Peter S. Fischer
- Producers: Douglas Benton; Cliff Gould; Lee Sheldon
- Camera setup: Single-camera
- Running time: 48 minutes
- Production company: Universal Television

Original release
- Network: NBC
- Release: January 5 – May 7, 1986

Blacke's Magic is an American crime drama television series that aired for 13 episodes on NBC, from January 5 to May 7, 1986. Reruns later aired during the fall of 1988, to fill scheduling gaps caused by the 1988 Writers Guild of America strike.

== Plot ==
Hal Linden stars as magician Alexander Blacke who, with some help from his con-man father Leonard (Harry Morgan), solves mysteries that get in the way of his performances. The series aired for a total of thirteen episodes and featured crimes that tested logic against seemingly magical crimes. The stories were not so much whodunits as "how-he-do-its," because Alex Blacke often had to turn detective to solve the mysteries.

== Cast ==
=== Main ===
- Hal Linden as Alexander Blacke
- Harry Morgan as Leonard Blacke

=== Recurring ===
- Paula Beyers as Gina
- Claudia Christian as Laurie Blacke
- Stephen Elliott as Senator Garity
- Justin Gocke as Jamie Byrnes
- Pippin Ingalls as Jill Byrnes
- Mark Shera as Lt. Ted Byrnes

== Episodes ==
No.	Title	Directed by	Written by	Original release date
Pilot	"Breathing Room"	John Llewellyn Moxey	Story by : Richard Levinson & William Link and Peter S. Fischer; Teleplay by : Peter S. Fischer	January 5, 1986
Series pilot: Two hour pilot: Magician Alexander Blacke decides to retire after a near-death experience; however, when an old friend of his is mysteriously murdered during a magic trick – he was somehow shot while sealed in a coffin underwater – Alex and his father Leonard investigate and help the police to figure it out.
1	"Ten Tons of Trouble"	Allen Reisner	Story by : Geoffrey Fischer; Teleplay by : Geoffrey Fischer & Cliff Gould	January 8, 1986
When a statue disappears in a matters of moments, Alex is asked to investigate. And when Alex learns that the chief of security is being held accountable, he tries to solve it and clear the man's name.
2	"Knave of Diamonds, Ace of Hearts"	Alan Cooke	Robert E. Swanson	January 15, 1986
Alex refuses an offer from a store manager to test the impenetrability of his vault, instead concocting a plan that Leonard carries out when he leaves town. Leonard reports a break-in to the police, and when they open up the vault they find that it contains the store manager's body. Leonard is arrested and bailed out by Alex when he returns, and they then go on the run in search of the truth.
3	"Revenge of the Esperanza"	Alvin Ganzer	Story by : Robert Brush; Teleplay by : Tom Sawyer & Robert Brush	January 22, 1986
Some marine biologists are looking for a lost wreck. They find it but as soon as they do, it floats up and goes away.
4	"Death Goes to the Movies"	Michael A. Hoey	Peter S. Fischer	January 29, 1986
While Alex is playing plot-advisor for a movie in the making, the movie's producer is suddenly killed.
5	"Vanishing Act"	Walter Grauman	Lee Sheldon	February 12, 1986
Alex and Leonard are stranded in the small town of Cryerville, California and use their magic skills to prevent a group of thieves from perpetrating an elaborate hoax.
6	"Prisoner of Paradise"	Alan Cooke	Philip Saltzman	February 19, 1986
Victor Kroeger, a man who had swindled a lot of people out of $122 million and had been on the run for 18 years, is finally caught, and Alex is asked to help bring him back to the US from San Marcos. Kroeger is kept in a guarded room atop a tower, but later in the evening he's found dead at the bottom of the tower, and the room is still locked from the inside. What happened?
7	"Address Unknown"	Allen Reisner	Lee Sheldon	February 26, 1986
Alex's former assistant comes to Alex for help when her ex-husband approaches her for help about corruption in a defense contract he's been working on. When Alex goes to meet the contact, someone shoots at him, and when he goes to take the police to the street where he met the contact, the street itself has gone missing.
8	"Forced Landing"	Paul Lynch	Robert Malcolm Young	March 5, 1986
An airplane lands with no crew and no passengers.
9	"Last Flight from Moscow"	Peter Sasdy	Cliff Gould	March 12, 1986
Alex is recruited to help a woman escape the Soviet embassy.
10	"A Friendly Game of Showdown"	Michael A. Hoey	Jackson Gillis	March 19, 1986
Alex finds himself requested to help stop industrial espionage.
11	"It's a Jungle Out There"	Alan Cooke	Steven Greenberg & Aubrey Solomon	April 2, 1986
Alex and Leonard find a U.S. diplomat being blackmailed by a Monte Carlo casino owner involving in selling technological secrets, so they come to the diplomat's aid.
12	"Wax Poetic"	Allen Reisner	Lee Sheldon	May 7, 1986
A Poe manuscript is purloined to Alex's apartment during an auction. Alex finds himself requested to rule at an auction selling the original, unpublished script made by Edgar Allan Poe.

== Ratings ==
The show ended the season in 38th place with an average 15.5/23 rating/share, being the highest rated series of the season not to be renewed. While it performed somewhat better than the series that preceded it in this time slot (Hell Town (TV series)), it shared the same two failures that were the downfall of both series: it failed to carry over a majority of the audience from its lead-in (Highway to Heaven) while also failing to capture any viewers from ABC's Dynasty. Though 'Magic' did perform just as well as the series that followed it (St. Elsewhere).

No.	Title	Air Date	Time	Rank	Rating	Viewers (Millions)
Pilot	Breathing Room	January 5, 1986	Sunday at 9:00 P.M.	#14 of 64	21.8	18.7
1	Ten Tons of Trouble	January 8, 1986	Wednesday at 9:00 P.M.	#20 of 51	19.1	16.4
2	Knave of Diamonds, Ace of Hearts	January 15, 1986	Wednesday at 9:00 P.M.	#32 of 71	17.2	14.8
3	Revenge of the Esperanza	January 22, 1986	Wednesday at 9:00 P.M.	#46 of 67	14.7	12.6
4	Death Goes to the Movies	January 29, 1986	Wednesday at 9:00 P.M.	#39 of 68	16.1	13.8
5	Vanishing Act	February 12, 1986	Wednesday at 9:00 P.M.	#39 of 68	16.1	13.8
6	Prisoner of Paradise	February 19, 1986	Wednesday at 9:00 P.M.	#38 of 55	15.8	13.6
7	Address Unknown	February 26, 1986	Wednesday at 9:00 P.M.	#37 of 63	14.3	12.3
8	Forced Landing	March 5, 1986	Wednesday at 9:00 P.M.	#34 of 69	15.2	13.0
9	Last Flight from Moscow	March 12, 1986	Wednesday at 9:00 P.M.	#31 of 69	15.7	13.4
10	A Friendly Game of Showdown	March 19, 1986	Wednesday at 9:00 P.M.	#38 of 65	13.7	11.8
11	It's a Jungle Out There	April 2, 1986	Wednesday at 9:00 P.M.	#31 of 67	15.7	13.4
12	Wax Poetic	May 7, 1986	Wednesday at 9:00 P.M.	#31 of 65	13.4	11.5

Source: A.C. Nielsen Company via Los Angeles Times

== Awards ==
- Primetime Emmy Awards 1986 - Nominated - Outstanding Cinematography for a Series - Terry K. Meade - For episode "Prisoner of Paradise".
- Edgar Allan Poe Awards 1987 - Nominated - Best Television Episode - Lee Sheldon (writer) - For episode "Wax Poetic".
