= The Gun (film) =

- Main title
- Genre: Drama; Thriller
- Screenplay by: Richard Levinson; William Link
- Story by: Jay Benson; Richard Levinson; William Link
- Directed by: John Badham
- Starring: David Huffman; Ron Thompson; Richard Bright; Pepe Serna; Lee de Broux; Stephen Elliott; Michael McGuire; John Sylvester White; Mariclare Costello
- Country of origin: United States
- Original language: English

Production
- Producers: Richard Levinson; William Link
- Cinematography: Stevan Larner
- Editor: Frank Morriss
- Running time: 78 minutes
- Production companies: Fairmont/Foxcroft Productions; Universal Television

Original release
- Network: ABC
- Release: November 13, 1974

The Gun is a 1974 American thriller drama television film.

The film stars David Huffman, Ron Thompson, Richard Bright, Pepe Serna, Lee de Broux, Stephen Elliott, Michael McGuire and John Sylvester White. It was written for television by Jay Benson, Richard Levinson, William Link and directed by John Badham. It aired as an ABC Movie of the Week on November 13, 1974.

The Gun was inspiration for the song "Golden Ring", recorded by George Jones and Tammy Wynette in 1976. The song would reach number-one on the Billboard Country Singles chart later that year.

== Plot ==
A series of interweaving stories tell the journey of a handgun, specifically, a .38 Special revolver, as it passes from one owner to another.

The opening credits run over scenes of the manufacture of the weapon. It is shipped to a gun store, where it is purchased by an older business owner whose home was recently burglarized. His wife is uncomfortable with the weapon in the house and convinces him to get rid of it. He gives it away to a security guard at his company, who pawns the gun.

Wayne, a young professional, asks for a gun at the pawn shop. He is displeased when told there is a five-day waiting period required by law. When the pawnbroker turns to get the blank paperwork, Wayne loads the gun with his own bullets and departs at gunpoint after paying for the pistol. At his place of employment, Wayne is given the news that because he has the least seniority, he is being laid off. He considers shooting his supervisor before walking outside to the building's plaza during lunchtime, making mock shooting motions at random bystanders with the gun. They are alarmed and call the police. When the police arrive, Wayne throws the gun through the open window of a parked car before he is arrested.

Two women get in the car, driving it to a car wash where an employee, Ignacio, discovers the gun under the front seat while vacuuming the interior. He takes it to his home in the barrio, where his brother and his pregnant wife both object to its presence. One day, the gun and his elderly father both go missing. They search and finally realize that after the recent death of his best friend, the father is depressed and considering suicide at the grave of his late wife. After stopping him, Ignacio throws the gun and bullets into a dumpster. A nearby worker sees the action, retrieves the gun and sells it to an illicit gun dealer.

The gun dealer sells the gun to a man who supplies criminals. The two criminals the pistol is intended for are planning to rob a porn theater's box office receipts, but their third member had second thoughts and backed out. After much wheedling, the third member agrees to be their lookout and getaway driver, keeping the pistol in his lap. At the theater, the owner recognizes one of the two criminals, Tom, as a former employee despite a ski mask. The owner pulls his own gun and threatens the robbers, as well as activating the silent alarm. They finally attempt to flee, but are immediately arrested outside.

Much later, the pistol is taken with a cache of other weapons for disposal at a scrapyard. It somehow survives intact after passing through the metal shredder and is picked up by the driver of a dump truck hired to haul the scrap to a steel mill. He takes it home, where his wife is concerned that their young son will find it. He promises to lock it up. One day, he is delayed by a breakdown of his truck. The bored boy looks through his parents' bedroom, finds the loaded gun on a closet shelf and starts to play with it, finally pointing the barrel towards his face. The camera pans away — and as the scene shows a shock-cut to black, the sound of the gun firing can be heard. It is implied (but never actually shown) that the boy has accidentally shot himself to death with the only bullet the gun ever fired.

== Critical reception ==
AllMovie rated the film one star out of five.

The New York Times, "The odyssey of an American handgun and the dramatic way it reshapes the lives of its various owners, in a plot similar to the famed overcoat in "Flesh and Fantasy" (1943)."

Sun Sentinel, "Powerful, episodic film, directed in a lean, semidocumentary style by John Badham (WarGames)."

== See also ==
- List of American films of 1974
