= Ellery Queen: Don't Look Behind You =

- Genre: Drama
- Based on: Cat of Many Tails by Ellery Queen
- Written by: Richard Levinson; William Link (together credited as "Ted Leighton")
- Directed by: Barry Shear
- Starring: Peter Lawford; Harry Morgan; E.G. Marshall; Stefanie Powers
- Theme music composer: Jerry Fielding
- Country of origin: United States
- Original language: English

Production
- Executive producer: Edward Montagne
- Producer: Leonard Ackerman
- Cinematography: William Margulies
- Editor: Sam E. Waxman
- Running time: 95 min.

Original release
- Network: NBC
- Release: November 19, 1971

Ellery Queen: Don't Look Behind You is a 1971 TV film adaptation of Ellery Queen's novel Cat of Many Tails. It aired on NBC.

== Production ==
The film was intended to spawn a new television series like the earlier versions of the character (The Adventures of Ellery Queen). Richard Levinson and William Link authored the script but were so dismayed with the changes made during production that they took their names off and instead used a pseudonym, "Ted Leighton".

Notably, the character of Inspector Richard Queen is here portrayed as Ellery's uncle instead of his father, as in the original stories. Critics speculated that this change was made because Harry Morgan was only eight years older than Peter Lawford and because the two had different accents (American and British).

== Cast ==
- Peter Lawford – Ellery Queen
- Harry Morgan – Inspector Richard Queen
- E.G. Marshall – Dr. Edward Cazalis
- Skye Aubrey – Christy
- Stefanie Powers – Celeste Phillips
- Coleen Gray – Mrs. Cazalis
- Morgan Sterne – Police Commissioner
- Bill Zuckert - Sgt. Thomas Velie
- Bob Hastings - Hal Hunter
- Than Wyenn - Registrar
- Buddy Lester - Policeman
- William Lucking - Lt. Summers
- Pat Delaney - Miss Price
- Tim Herbert
- Robin Raymond
- Victoria Hale
- Billy Sands as Adrian Abbott

== Legacy ==
While the film failed to generate a series, four years later Levinson and Link were given an opportunity to try again. 1975's Ellery Queen: Too Many Suspects led to Ellery Queen which starred Jim Hutton and David Wayne. The show lasted one season, but has remained a cult classic.
