= Guilty Conscience (film) =

1985 American television film by David Greene

- Genre: Crime; Drama; Mystery
- Written by: Richard Levinson; William Link
- Directed by: David Greene
- Starring: Anthony Hopkins; Blythe Danner; Swoosie Kurtz
- Music by: Billy Goldenberg
- Country of origin: United States
- Original language: English

Production
- Executive producers: Richard Levinson; William Link
- Producer: Robert A. Papazian
- Production location: San Francisco
- Cinematography: Stevan Larner
- Editor: Parkie L. Singh
- Running time: 104 min.
- Production companies: Richard Levinson / William Link Productions; Robert Papazian Productions

Original release
- Network: CBS
- Release: April 2, 1985

Guilty Conscience is a 1985 American television film, produced by Robert A. Papazian, written by Richard Levinson and William Link, directed by David Greene, starring Anthony Hopkins, Blythe Danner and Swoosie Kurtz. The film score was composed by Billy Goldenberg. It premiered on April 2, 1985 on CBS.

== Plot ==
Arthur Jamison, a wealthy criminal defense attorney, is facing a costly divorce from his wife, Louise. Arthur deals with the predicament by imagining numerous schemes in which he kills her. As a defense attorney, Arthur is familiar with both the courts and the minds of criminals, and he spends much of the film consulting an officious imaginary version of himself for the perfect scheme to rid himself of Louise. Arthur runs each murder, or the subsequent trial, through in his mind, searching for problems, loopholes, and the elusive watertight alibi.

Arthur's mistress, Jackie Willis, meets up with Louise in secret. The two concoct a scheme to kill Arthur. They confront Arthur at gunpoint, planning to stage his murder as a suicide. Unfazed, Arthur takes control of the situation, pointing out the flaws in what was supposed to be their foolproof scheme. For one thing, Arthur tells them he has been cheating on both of them with a third woman and was about to go out on a highly anticipated date with her, so was not of a mindset to commit suicide.

Furthermore, Arthur reveals that he had been recording the entire confrontation with Louise and Jackie. He uses the tape to attempt to blackmail Louise, but, enraged by the implosion of her plan, she chases her husband with a gun. A brief struggle ensues, and Louise is shot dead. Now, however, Louise's accidental death implicates Arthur for having murdered her. Arthur had only been bluffing about the tape, there is no evidence that the shooting was an accident other than the word of Jackie, his mistress, who may not be willing to testify to exonerate him. Arthur imagines himself in court, his imaginary self now his own prosecutor, and how the case will unfold.

At this point the film shows Arthur back at home, again poking holes in the scheme. It is revealed to be yet another of his unrealized, purely imaginary plans.

Louise arrives home, shoots him dead, and phones Jackie to inform her the deed is done. The film ends with Louise rearranging the living room to cover up evidence of the murder.

== Cast ==
- Anthony Hopkins as Arthur Jamison
- Blythe Danner as Louise Jamison
- Swoosie Kurtz as Jackie Willis
- Donegan Smith as Arthur Jamison's Double
- Wiley Harker as Older Man
- Ruth Manning as Older Woman

== Critical reception ==
TV Guide gave a rave review, writing "Tightly plotted, flawlessly paced and clever rather than gimmicky, Guilty Conscience is the sort of Hitchcock homage that can hold its own against the master's work."
