= Jack Swain =

English footballer

Personal information
- Full name: John Sanderson Swain
- Date of birth: 13 April 1914
- Place of birth: Grimsby, England
- Date of death: 2000 (aged 85–86)
- Height: 5 ft 7 in (1.70 m)
- Position: Winger

Senior career*
Years	Team	Apps	(Gls)
1936–1939	Grimsby Town	22	(6)
1939	Scunthorpe & Lindsey United		
- * Club domestic league appearances and goals

John Sanderson Swain (13 April 1914 – 2000) was an English professional footballer who played as a winger.
