= The Guardian (1984 film) =

1984 American TV film

- Genre: Thriller
- Written by: Richard Levinson; William Link
- Directed by: David Greene
- Starring: Martin Sheen; Louis Gossett Jr. Arthur Hill; Tandy Cronyn; Simon Reynolds; Tom Harvey
- Composer: Robert O. Ragland
- Countries of origin: United States; Canada
- Original language: English

Production
- Producer: Stanley Chase
- Production locations: New York City; Toronto
- Cinematography: Richard Ciupka
- Editor: Edward M. Abroms
- Running time: 105 minutes
- Production companies: HBO Premiere Films; Robert Cooper Productions; Stanley Chase Productions; Lorimar Productions

Original release
- Network: HBO
- Release: October 20, 1984

The Guardian is a 1984 American thriller film directed by David Greene and written by Richard Levinson and William Link. The film stars Martin Sheen, Louis Gossett Jr., Arthur Hill, Tandy Cronyn, Simon Reynolds and Tom Harvey. The film premiered on HBO on October 20, 1984.

== Plot ==
The inhabitants of a New York City apartment building are plagued by burglaries and murder, and they have finally had enough. So they employ ex-military man John Mack (Louis Gossett Jr.) to protect their building as a security guard. Mack's techniques are precise and intense, and soon his overbearing and power-mad nature begins to chafe resident Charles Hyatt (Martin Sheen). Hyatt seeks Mack's removal, but will he have to forfeit his own safety in his quest for freedom?

The ending illustrates how Charles Hyatt comes to terms with the necessity of having a tough, no-nonsense security guard in order to protect the residents in their part of town (albeit reluctantly).

== Cast ==
- Martin Sheen as Charlie Hyatt
- Louis Gossett Jr. as John Mack
- Arthur Hill as Dr. Phil Julian
- Tandy Cronyn as Lynn Hyatt
- Simon Reynolds as Robbie Hyatt
- Tom Harvey as Mr. Wicker
- Maury Chaykin as Rudy Simbro
- Anthony Sherwood as Mr. Chambers
- Taborah Johnson as Mrs. Chambers
- Dinah Christie as Claire Julian
- Kate Lynch as Fran
- Bathsheba Garnett as Mrs. Jacobs
- Hadley Kay as Jason
- Wendy Crewson as Marlee Kramer
- Sean McCann as Lieutenant Yaeger
- Harvey Atkin as Mr. Wallace
- Robert Reece as Beret
- Al Bernardo as Mr. Andriola
- Sharon Dyer as Mrs. Andriola
- Alex Leslie as Lorraine
- Marcia Diamond as Mrs. Wallace
- John Dee as Fletch
- John LeFleur as Stuart
- Ross Petty as McCarthey
