= Honey West (TV series) =

American crime drama television series (1965–1966)

- Honey West complete series DVD cover (UK version)
- Genre: Crime drama Action
- Based on: Honey West by Skip and G.G. Fickling
- Developed by: Gwen Bagni; Paul Dubov
- Starring: Anne Francis; John Ericson
- Theme music composer: Joseph Mullendore
- Country of origin: United States
- Original language: English
- No. of seasons: 1
- No. of episodes: 30 (list of episodes)

Production
- Executive producer: Aaron Spelling
- Producer: Richard Newton
- Camera setup: Single camera
- Running time: 25 minutes
- Production company: Four Star Television

Original release
- Network: ABC
- Release: September 17, 1965 – April 8, 1966

Related
- Burke's Law

Honey West is an American crime drama television series that aired on ABC from September 17, 1965, to April 8, 1966, as an entry in the 1965–1966 television season. Based upon a series of novels that had launched in 1957, the series starred Anne Francis as female private detective Honey West and John Ericson as her partner Sam Bolt. It was one of the first network TV series whose title was the name of a female lead character, another being Hazel in 1961 (the syndicated Annie Oakley had a similar distinction in its category a decade earlier).

Thirty half-hour episodes were produced. Historians today sometimes call the show "ground-breaking" due to its portrayal of the female lead.

== Creation ==
The Honey West character was created by Gloria and Forrest E. "Skip" Fickling under the pseudonym "G.G. Fickling" in the late 1950s. Skip had been a United States Army Air Forces air gunner during World War II, then enlisted in the U.S. Marine Corps Reserve after the war, when he was called back into active service during the Korean War. The G.G. represented the initials of his wife, Gloria Gautraud, whom he married in 1949, with initials used so the sex of the author would remain vague. Though Gloria said that most of the writing was done by Forrest, Forrest said Gloria's ideas were used to make a plausible female character, with Gloria also providing Honey's dress sense. Forrest told the Los Angeles Times, "I first thought of Marilyn Monroe, and then I thought of [fictional detective] Mike Hammer and decided to put the two together ... We thought the most used name for someone you really like is Honey. And she lives in the West, so there was her name."

West was one of the first female "private eyes" to appear on television. Francis first played West in the second-season episode of Burke's Law entitled "Who Killed the Jackpot?", broadcast on April 21, 1965, which led to this series being commissioned as a spin-off. West drove a Jaguar convertible in the Burke's Law episode and was twice referred to as the "private eyeful". She carried a gun and was trained in martial arts. Honey West was intended to be the American equivalent of characters Cathy Gale and Emma Peel in the British series The Avengers.

Producer Aaron Spelling's first choice for the role of Honey was Honor Blackman, whom he had seen in England playing Cathy Gale on The Avengers and as Pussy Galore in Goldfinger. Blackman turned down the role. Anne Francis' fashions in the Honey role were by Nolan Miller, and her action scenes choreographed by Gene LeBell. The series was developed for television by Gwen Bagni and Paul Dubov, writers of several Burke's Law episodes.

== Synopsis ==
As in the Burke's Law episode introducing her, West has a partner and man-Friday, Sam Bolt (John Ericson), who communicates with Honey via a radio hidden in her lipstick case. In the television series, she keeps a pet ocelot named Bruce.

Honey's alluring feline qualities were reflected in her animal-print wardrobe and apartment decor. For sneaking around at night and engaging in fight scenes, she wore a black fabric bodystocking. West often went on solo undercover missions that required a provocative or revealing outfit.

She used a number of James Bond–like gimmicks: a high-tech surveillance van, an exploding compact, a garter-belt gas mask, and tear-gas earrings. West was a black-belt in judo, as was Sam, an ex-Marine.

Some episodes of this series, including the final one, were scripted by Richard Levinson and William Link, who would later be affiliated with such series as Columbo and Murder, She Wrote. Episode 3, "The Abominable Snowman", has a plot where cocaine is being smuggled inside snow globes, and is one of the earliest references in popular TV culture to cocaine as "snow".

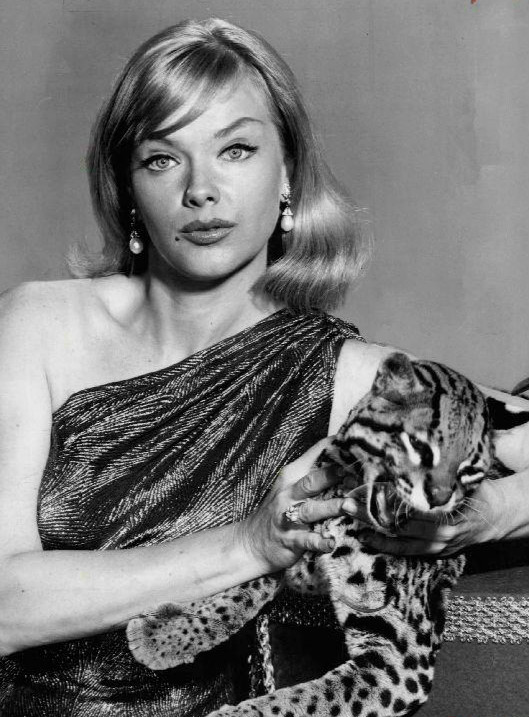
Francis as Honey West with Bruce

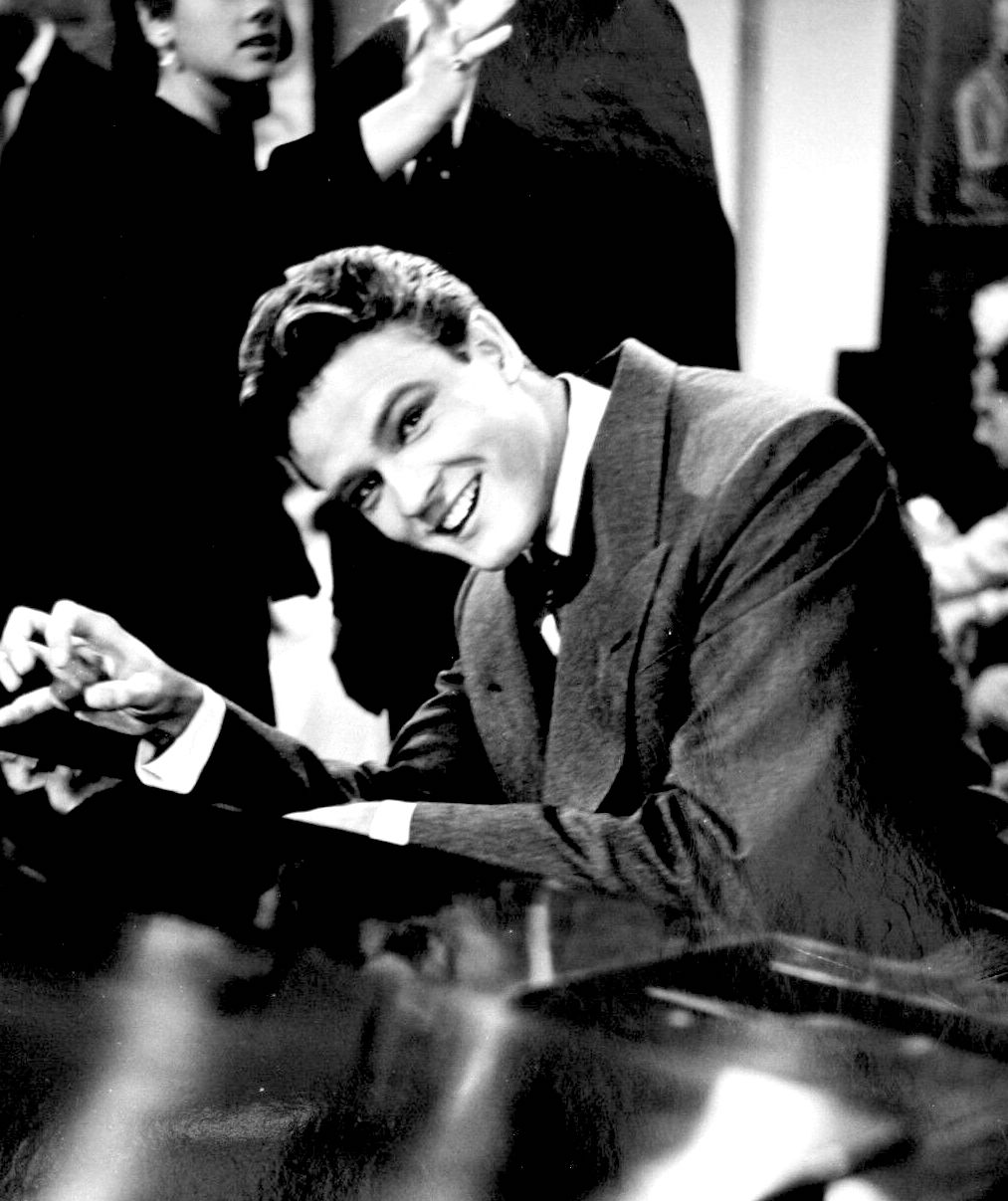
John Ericson

== Cast ==
- Anne Francis as Honey West
- John Ericson as Sam Bolt
- Irene Hervey as Aunt Meg

=== Guest stars ===
Among those appearing during the series' 30-episode run were Joe Don Baker, Fred Beir, James Best, Lloyd Bochner, Edd Byrnes, Dick Clark, Duke Fishman, Chuck Hicks, Bern Hoffman, Charlene Holt, George Keymas, Nancy Kovack, Joel Lawrence, Leon Lontoc, Kevin McCarthy, Maureen McCormick, Troy Melton, Bert Parks, Joseph V. Perry, Joe Ploski, Michael J. Pollard, Wayne Rogers, Frank J. Scannell, Everett Sloane, Bobby Sherman, Paul Stader, Jack Tornek and Charles Wagenheim.

== Episodes ==
No.	Title	Directed by	Written by	Original release date	Prod. code
1	"The Swingin' Mrs. Jones"	Paul Wendkos	Gwen Bagni & Paul Dubov	September 17, 1965	6410
Honey sets out to solve a mystery at a resort.
2	"The Owl and the Eye"	Paul Wendkos	William Bast	September 24, 1965	6404
A jade owl is stolen from a museum.
3	"The Abominable Snowman"	Paul Wendkos	Gwen Bagni & Paul Dubov	October 1, 1965	6402
When a man is murdered, Honey and Sam discover and expose a cocaine ring.
4	"A Matter of Wife and Death"	John Florea	Tony Barrett	October 8, 1965	6420
Honey and Sam take action when Maggie's life is threatened....or is it?
5	"Live a Little... Kill a Little"	Murray Golden	Tony Barrett	October 15, 1965	6406
Karen has been targeted for death. Will Honey and Sam be able to keep her safe?
6	"Whatever Lola Wants...."	John Peyser	William Bast	October 22, 1965	6416
When Honey agrees to go to Lola's party with Vargas, she discovers Lola is a criminal mastermind.
7	"The Princess and the Paupers"	Virgil W. Vogel	Leonard Stadd	October 29, 1965	6422
Honey and Sam investigate the kidnapping of a rock group's frontman (Bobby Sherman).
8	"In the Bag"	Seymour Robbie	Gwen Bagni & Paul Dubov	November 5, 1965	6408
Honey has her hands full with a bratty child and a gang of gem smugglers.
9	"The Flame and the Pussycat"	James Goldstone	George Clayton Johnson	November 12, 1965	6428
Honey and Sam are on the trail of a mysterious arsonist.
10	"A Neat Little Package"	Murray Golden	Gwen Bagni & Paul Dubov	November 19, 1965	6418
An amnesiac, a hotel room key, and a huge wad of money are essential clues in a bizarre mystery.
11	"A Stitch in Crime"	John Peyser	Gwen Bagni & Paul Dubov	November 26, 1965	6424
En route to a fashion show in San Francisco, Honey and Sam are carjacked, and a number of very expensive gowns are stolen along with their van.
12	"A Million Bucks in Anybody's Language"	John Florea	Tony Barrett	December 3, 1965	6426
When their friend, Charlie is killed by a car bomb, Honey and Sam discover a counterfeiting ring.
13	"The Gray Lady (Pilot Episode)"	Walter Grauman	Richard Levinson & William Link	December 10, 1965	5953
Honey comes up with a plan to prevent the theft of a valuable diamond.
14	"Invitation to Limbo"	Tom Gries	Richard Levinson & William Link	December 17, 1965	6412
Local businessmen are being hypnotized into committing inside jobs.
15	"Rockabye the Hard Way"	Bill Colleran	Gwen Bagni & Paul Dubov	December 24, 1965	6434
Honey and Sam deal with bad guys in Mexico.
16	"A Nice Little Till to Tap"	Jerry Hopper	Tony Barrett	December 31, 1965	6432
Honey and Sam take on bank robbers.
17	"How Brillig, O, Beamish Boy"	Ida Lupino	Don Ingalls	January 7, 1966	6440
A criminal gang led by Mr. Brillig is after a package containing a large amount of cash.
18	"King of the Mountain"	Thomas Carr	Jay Simms	January 14, 1966	6438
A paraplegic man may be behind the murder of his own nurse.
19	"It's Earlier Than You Think"	James H. Brown	Marc Brandel	January 21, 1966	6446
A newspaper with a front page story about Lincoln's assassination, a murder victim's cryptic statement, and three men claiming to be the dead man's brother draw Honey into her most baffling case yet.
20	"The Perfect Un-Crime"	Sidney Miller	Ken Kolb	January 28, 1966	6442
A thief recruits Honey and Sam to put back the money he stole from his own department store. Note: The scene of Honey posing as a mannequin was inspired by The Twilight Zone episode "The After Hours", which starred Anne Francis.
21	"Like Visions and Omens and All That Jazz"	John Florea	Tony Barrett	February 4, 1966	6448
A psychic's predictions endanger the life of a young heiress.
22	"Don't Look Now, But Isn't That Me"	James H. Brown	Gwen Bagni & Paul Dubov	February 11, 1966	6444
A woman disguised as Honey frames her for a series of robberies. Note: Anne Francis plays both Honey West and the impostor, Pandora.
23	"Come to Me, My Litigation Baby"	Thomas Carr	Gwen Bagni & Paul Dubov	February 18, 1966	6450
A gang of criminals are committing insurance fraud by faking accidents.
24	"Slay, Gypsy, Slay"	James H. Brown	Tony Barrett	February 25, 1966	6454
When a rich man is kidnapped by a band of gypsies, things are not what they appear to be.
25	"The Fun-Fun Killer"	Murray Golden	Arthur Weingarten	March 4, 1966	6458
The owner of a toy factory, and a researcher at the factory's testing lab have both been murdered by a life-sized robot.
26	"Pop Goes the Easel"	James H. Brown	Story by : Gail Allen & Chris Christensen; Teleplay by : Lila Garrett & Bernie Kahn	March 11, 1966	6460
Aunt Meg can't understand why thieves stole a can of chicken gumbo that she just bought at the supermarket.
27	"Little Green Robin Hood"	Sidney Miller	Ken Kolb	March 18, 1966	6456
A man suffers from delusions about being Robin Hood.
28	"Just the Bear Facts, Ma'am"	James H. Brown	Gwen Bagni & Paul Dubov	March 25, 1966	6462
Honey and Sam look into criminal activity on a movie set where they're working as stunt doubles.
29	"There's a Long, Long, Fuse A'Burning"	Thomas Carr	Gwen Bagni & Paul Dubov	April 1, 1966	6468
An ex-convict realizes criminals are framing him for robberies by setting off explosives.
30	"An Eerie, Airy, Thing"	James H. Brown	Richard Levinson & William Link	April 8, 1966	6466
George Forbes is discovered on the ledge of a hotel, calling out for his wife, Diana. Trouble is, she's been murdered.

== Reception ==
Honey West was cancelled after just one season, largely because of competition from the more established Gomer Pyle, U.S.M.C. and financial considerations. ABC executives reportedly decided it would be cheaper to import The Avengers and air it in the same time slot rather than produce Honey West at a significantly steeper price.

While the series was short-lived, it was one of the high-water marks of Francis's professional career. She received nominations for a Golden Globe Award and a Best Actress Emmy, the latter for which she was declared the winner.

The series was rerun in the late 1990s as part of TV Land's inaugural lineup. It also occasionally aired on Decades (currently Catchy Comedy).

== Home media ==
In 2006, Delta Home Entertainment released the entire series on Region 0 DVD in the UK.

VCI Entertainment issued a North American Region 1 DVD release of the series in September 2008.

== Print adaptations ==
Gold Key Comics issued a one-shot comic book adaptation of the television series in September 1966, scripted by Paul S. Newman, with artwork by Jack Sparling. Overlook Press published Honey West - This Girl For Hire, a novel, in 2005. From 2010-2013, Moonstone (comics) produced Honey West comics, a hardcover novel, and a two paperbacks. BearManor Media, in 2011, published a profusely illustrated 228-page tribute to the series, examining it in detail with interviews of the surviving cast members, and listings of websites, addresses, bibliographies, episode synopses, and an appendix.
