= The Boys (1991 film) =

- British VHS cover of The Guys
- Genre: Drama; Black Comedy
- Written by: William Link
- Directed by: Glenn Jordan
- Starring: James Woods; John Lithgow
- Theme music composer: David Shire
- Country of origin: United States
- Original language: English

Production
- Executive producers: James G. Hirsch; William Link; Robert A. Papazian
- Producer: Glenn Jordan
- Cinematography: Steve Yaconelli
- Editor: Eric Sears
- Running time: 95 minutes
- Production companies: Papazian-Hirsch Entertainment International; William Link Productions

Original release
- Network: ABC
- Release: April 15, 1991

The Boys (aka The Guys) is a drama/black comedy television film starring James Woods and John Lithgow. It was directed by Glenn Jordan, who had previously worked with Woods on the 1986 TV movie Promise and later worked with Woods again in 1994 for the TV drama film Jane's House. The film first aired on September 15, 1991 on the ABC Network.

== Plot ==
Walter and Artie are longtime writing partners who have worked together on film and television scripts for 20 years. Walter, who has maintained a healthy lifestyle despite Artie's heavy smoking, is diagnosed with lung cancer and given six months to live. As he deals with his illness, Walter attempts to put his affairs in order by teaching writing to prison inmates, reconnecting with his son and former wife, and encouraging Artie to stop smoking.

== Cast ==
- James Woods as Walter Farmer
- John Lithgow as Artie Margulies
- Joanna Gleason as Marie
- Eve Gordon as Amanda
- Alan Rosenberg as the Psychiatrist
- Rosemary Dunsmore as Helene
- Albert Hall (uncredited role)
- Rosanna Huffman as Carolyn
- Natalia Nogulich as Denise
- John Vickery as Dr. Simon
- Ebbe Roe Smith as Sokalow
- George Wallace as Ray
- Jesse Bradford as Walter Farmer Jr.
- Alma Martinez as the Therapist

== Production ==
The film was largely inspired by the lives of the film's writer William Link and his long-time writing partner, Richard Levinson, and Levinson's death. However, the key plot point of the story didn't happen in reality, as Levinson was the smoker.

Link spoke of the film's story and the writing of the script. "Call it therapy. I had mentioned this concept to Dick several years before he died, but he did not want to write it. I asked him why, and he said "you guess". I don't think he wanted to be under scrutiny in promoting the show, with people asking him, "Why are you chain-smoking in this interview when you just produced a movie that is against it?" A week after Dick died in 1987, I was at ABC with Brandon Stoddard (the network's former programming chief). He said "What have your got for us?" I told him this idea, he thought it was terrific, and he said I had an on-the-air commitment. He also said "I think it'll be very good therapy for you." Dick and I had written every line together. I was used to working in a room with my best friend for 41 years, and when he died, I felt stranded. I was very fearful that I couldn't write, because my crutch wasn't there anymore. It was as if I'd had an amputation, and it took me about 10 months to get around to this. In four two-day weekends, I wrote "The Boys," and it just poured out. It was like someone was dictating it to me."

Link's worries of writing solo were soothed considerably with the signing of the two central roles to Woods and Lithgow. "It's rare in this business that you get two people who are so dedicated to the material. They wouldn't change one syllable, and they treated the script like Biblical text. That's amazing, because sometimes, you work with people who learn their dialogue right on the set while the director is blocking the shot." In the article, Woods also stated that he believed that The Boys is "very lighthearted in its approach to a very serious subject. It's a very odd piece, but in the best sense of that term. It's not a structured three-act story, but a pastiche of the relationship of these two wonderful men who loved each other for so long. Some of it's very funny and some of it's very sad, but finally, it's like a two-hour window into this long relationship. It's a real love letter from Bill Link to his friendship with Dick Levinson."

According to the Los Angeles Times, Link used to say that his relationship with Levinson was like marriage without the sex. The story was written by Link as a form of private therapy to get over Levinson's death. Neither Woods or Lithgow worried about taking time out of their film careers to do a TV film. "Each of us looks for good material. And a lot of good material today is written for television," said Lithgow, whilst Woods agreed that "there's always been great material on television."

The film was the first TV movie to deal directly with the issue of secondary smoke, although both leading actors insisted that The Boys was not a network disease-of-the-week movie. "The secondary smoke is certainly an important aspect of the story," Lithgow said. "One man is dying because the other man smokes. It's an important little turn of the plot, but it's sort of the last thing I think about. This is not an advocacy film, in my mind, at all."

"But (secondary smoke) is the motor of the story," Woods said. "It's the deus ex machina, if you will, that propels the story. It causes this almost repressed friendship to finally blossom. It's that terrible reality in life that sometimes we only are able to express our love to people when we're losing them or have lost them."

Lithgow and Woods said they developed the kind of comic rapport and unspoken bond that Levinson and Link shared. After Woods was cast in the film, the filmmakers searched for the best person to play Woods' partner: "I told my agent to close his eyes and imagine the best person to play Artie, and I'll do the same thing. And we both came up with Mickey Rooney, but he wasn't available. After, we went for Andy Rooney, and then Andy Garcia, then finally John. But John was doing The Last Elephant at the time."

"I was off in Africa," Lithgow said. "You couldn't phone in and you couldn't get calls out, but somehow or other a faxed script arrived on my bed one night by a carrier caribou." Describing the acting in the film, Lithgow stated "The first time I saw James was in a student production of Jean-Paul Sartre's The Victors, when he was 19 years old, even back then, I'd heard an awful lot about him and his work process. We work in a very, very similar way, which is perfect for this movie." Woods added "It's a sort of shorthand". "Very fast," Lithgow said. "In fact, the relationship between these two writers is so easy and fun for us to play because that's very much like our collaborative relationship as actors. We have already devised a thousand little tricks. His mind just whirs along, and I love to keep pace with it."

Woods and Lithgow were immediately looking for a new project together after The Boys. "We have the same agency, so we told our agents to put their heads together on our behalf," Lithgow said. "And they'll probably come up with some fabulous script, and then give it to Redford and Newman," Woods said. However, Woods and Lithgow wouldn't work together again.

Today, the film remains out-of-print in America, having never received a VHS or DVD release. In the UK, where the film was re-titled The Guys, the movie was released on VHS via CIC Video, where it has remained out-of-print.

== Critical reception ==
Upon release, the film was highly acclaimed.

Allmovie gave the film three out of five stars and wrote "The Boys is an "a clef" celebration of the famed script writing team of Richard Levinson and William Link. Link himself wrote this story about two lifelong collaborator/friends. Some observers have suggested that Link penned this tale more out of guilt than friendship; whatever the case, he wisely avoids overloading the material with sentiment, allowing the "boys" to kid around and squabble as much as they ever had. As a bonus, there's a Columbo-style mystery angle in the proceedings to keep the hard-core Levinson/Link fans happy."

Entertainment Weekly awarded the film a C grade and wrote "Woods and Lithgow spend the length of the movie examining their friendship and talking, talking, talking. Although Woods has a girlfriend and Lithgow a wife, much of The Boys operates like a two-character play. The Boys is an exhausting, all-too-cleverly-crafted tragicomedy. The TV movie was written by William Link, who for years wrote and produced scripts with his partner, Richard Levinson. Levinson died in 1987; The Boys is clearly Link's salute to his collaborator and friend. This noble, heartfelt gesture has yielded a sentimental story."

Sky Movies gave a favorable review, stating "This TV movie will be of interest to anyone who has ever sat through a Columbo case or a Murder, She Wrote mystery. It tells the story of the final months in the life of their creator Richard Levinson as he fought lung cancer. It was penned by his partner-in-crime William Link, which makes it all the more poignant. Given the subject matter, The Boys is surprisingly funny. The plot bubbles along nicely and only puts a foot wrong when it tries to be clever or ends up a touch melodramatic. But Artie and Walter emerge as real flesh and blood characters and no-one can doubt the depth of feelings harboured by Link for his late colleague or the pain at his loss."

The Chicago Tribune gave an unfavorable review, writing "As a two-hour anti-smoking advertisement, The Boys is an effective message. As a two-hour homage from one-half of a famous screenwriting team to his dead partner, The Boys is an affectionate tribute. But as a showcase for the talents of two fine actors, John Lithgow and James Woods, The Boys is a bust, just as it is as entertainment or tearjerker. Sure, it's well-intentioned. William Link who, along with the late Richard Levinson, created such hits as Columbo, Mannix and Murder, She Wrote, obviously means this film as a memorial to Levinson. But filled with a shocking playfulness, the film doesn't delineate, in any interesting fashion, the nature of the friendship or the pain of its end. Woods and Lithgow are forced to behave like rambunctious, emotionally shackled toddlers. Surely there are people who behave with such virtue, who try to tidy their lives. Perhaps this is really the way Levinson behaved. But here it has a forced ring, at once too giddy and righteous."

The Lawrence Journal-World gave an unfavorable review, stating '"Take two first-rate character actors, the prodigiously talented John Lithgow and James Woods. Give them a script unworthy of their powers. Watch their light blast through the holes in it like laser beams. The film has its moments, to be sure, but mostly it's the pleasure of watching these two pros at work. The Boys is somewhere between drama and black comedy, a modified Felix-and-Oscar story hinged on passive smoking, cancer and male bonding."'
