= Murder by Natural Causes =

1979 American made-for-television film

- Written by: Richard Levinson; William Link
- Directed by: Robert Day
- Starring: Hal Holbrook; Katharine Ross; Richard Anderson; Barry Bostwick
- Music by: Dick DeBenedictis
- Country of origin: United States
- Original language: English

Production
- Producers: Richard Levinson; William Link; Robert Papazian; Pattee Roedig
- Cinematography: Jack Swain
- Editor: Frank Morriss
- Running time: 100 minutes
- Production company: Richard Levinson/William Link Productions

Original release
- Network: CBS

Murder by Natural Causes is a 1979 American television film directed by Robert Day and starring Hal Holbrook, Katharine Ross, Richard Anderson, and Barry Bostwick. It is a crime mystery written by the creators of the TV series Columbo, Richard Levinson and William Link.

== Plot ==
Arthur Sinclair (Hal Holbrook) is a successful and famous mentalist who is recovering from a cardiac condition. The movie opens as Arthur is talking on the phone with his much younger wife Allison (Katharine Ross). She wishes him luck as he departs to appear as a guest on a late-night television talk show. However, she is in fact in bed with another, much younger man, Gil Weston (Barry Bostwick). Weston is a struggling actor in love with Allison, and we soon learn she is planning to have Gil kill Arthur by scaring him to death (by overloading his weakened heart).

The night comes and Gil breaks in. When Arthur finds him in the house, Gil presents himself as a journalist there to have a supposedly scheduled interview with Arthur arranged by Allison. He and Gil have a conversation, with Gil trying to push Arthur's buttons by insinuating that Arthur is a fake. Gil then uses Arthur's competitive behavior to goad him into doing 50 push-ups to allegedly tire out Arthur's heart. Soon Gil reveals that he is Allison's lover and has come to kill him, pointing a gun Allison had planted in the room at Arthur. When Gil is momentarily distracted, the two men struggle, and Arthur apparently shoots Gil. When Allison comes home, he is distraught by the incident; then when Arthur appears to be having a heart attack, Allison leaves, supposedly get his medicine, but stops at the top of the stairs. Gil (Allison had loaded a blank bullet into the gun) comes up behind Arthur, and Arthur screams in terror, stumbles across the house and collapses...then laughs and applauds Gil's "performance".

Arthur has known about Allison and Gil for months, thanks to his private investigator, and now he is out to get them. Gil is forced to leave after Arthur reveals he has taken precautions against any further attempts on his life. Alone with Allison, Arthur reveals his plan to divorce her but make sure she leaves with nothing. Then suddenly, Arthur's attorney and longtime friend George (Richard Anderson) arrives. He turns out to be Allison's real lover, with Gil being just a patsy whom George and Allison had used in order to frame him for Arthur's murder. George shoots Arthur, then he and Allison depart to establish their alibi. Some time afterwards, Allison returns to the house and finds that Arthur's body is gone; frantically, she searches the house but finds nothing. Then Arthur's voice on a playing video recording brings her into the living room, where she finds Arthur very much alive. It turned out that Arthur had known about George as well, but had wondered if George would actually go through with murder. Arthur had replaced all the bullets in the gun with blanks and secretly audio-recorded the events of the evening, including both attempts to murder him.

Arthur next outlines possible outcomes: first, to send the recording, which includes the fact that Gil Weston was used as a scapegoat, to Gil; second, to give the recording to the authorities, which will result in Allison and George's being arrested and tried. He then points the pistol, now loaded with real bullets, at Allison and outlines a third alternative: to kill her, frame Gil for her murder, just as she and George had planned to frame him for Arthur's, and force George to remain silent, since Arthur still has the recorded evidence. Broken, she asks him what he is going to do. Arthur replies: "I have a suggestion for you, darling...why don't you read my mind?"

== Releases ==
Murder by Natural Causes first aired on CBS on February 17, 1979, and later was broadcast in syndication a few times and then it was released on VHS.

In 1985, Tim Kelly penned a stage adaptation.
