= That Certain Summer =

- Original promotional ad
- Genre: Drama
- Written by: Richard Levinson; William Link
- Directed by: Lamont Johnson
- Starring: Hal Holbrook; Hope Lange; Martin Sheen; Scott Jacoby
- Theme music composer: Gil Melle
- Country of origin: United States
- Original language: English

Production
- Producers: Richard Levinson; William Link
- Cinematography: Vilis Lapenieks
- Editor: Edward M. Abroms
- Running time: 73 min.
- Production company: Universal Television

Original release
- Network: ABC
- Release: November 1, 1972

That Certain Summer is a 1972 American made-for-television drama film directed by Lamont Johnson. The teleplay by Richard Levinson and William Link was considered the first sympathetic depiction of gay people on American television.

Produced by Universal Television, it was broadcast as an ABC Movie of the Week on November 1, 1972, and received a number of television awards and nominations. The movie was also recognized as being the first network drama to depict a stable, same-sex couple; the first to depict a gay parent; and the first gay-themed show to win an Emmy, with Scott Jacoby winning for his performance. A novelization of the film written by Burton Wohl was published by Bantam Books.

== Plot ==
Divorced San Francisco contractor Doug Salter is looking forward to a summer visit from his 14-year-old son Nick, who lives in Los Angeles with his mother Janet. The boy does not know that his father is gay and in a committed relationship to Gary McClain, his life partner of several years.

Gary stays temporarily with his sister and brother-in-law so that Doug can come out to Nick and tell him about their relationship, rather than surprise him all at once. But Gary otherwise spends most of his time with Doug and Nick, and the boy notices his father seems unusually close to Gary. At one point, Doug takes off his watch to reach into an aquarium. Nick sees the inscription on the watch - "To Doug With Love Gary" and realizes his father and Gary are more than friends. Greatly confused, he runs off.

Janet arrives from L.A. as Doug and Gary are looking for him. Nick is at the cable car barn, where a sympathetic employee, realizing the boy has something on his mind, convinces him to go home. Janet and Gary have a poignant conversation during which Gary asserts, "If I were a woman, this would all be acceptable!" to which Janet calmly replies, "If you were a woman, I would know how to compete with you."

Meanwhile, Doug and Nick have gone off alone to have a talk. Nick has sort of heard of the word homosexuality but is not quite sure what it means. Doug attempts to explain that, "Gary and I have a kind of marriage." It is too much for Nick to take in; the visit ends so it is time for him to pack and go home. Doug and Janet talk briefly, and Janet tells him not to worry about Nick. "Just give him a little time."

== Production notes ==
Hal Holbrook said he turned down the role when it initially was offered to him. "I wasn't worried about whether the character was a gay person or not; the reason I turned it down, frankly, is I read the script and I didn't think much happened in it. I just thought it was kind of tame." After discussing the script with Carol Rossen, his second wife, he changed his mind and accepted the role. He felt an emotional connection to the character in the film because at the time he had separated from his first wife and had not told his two young children about the split. "It was very easy and natural for me to translate the emotional turmoil I personally was feeling into the turmoil [Doug] was feeling." The film remains important to him because it meant so much to so many people.

In a 2007 interview with the Dallas Voice, Martin Sheen reminisced, "I thought it was wonderful. There was a great deal of freedom in it because it wasn't about advocating a lifestyle or a sexuality. It was about two people who adored each other, and they weren't allowed to have a relationship that involved their sexuality." When asked if at the time he was concerned the role could affect his career, he responded, "I'd robbed banks and kidnapped children and raped women and murdered people, you know, in any number of shows. Now I was going to play a gay guy and that was like considered a career ender. Oh, for Christ’s sake! What kind of culture do we live in?"

Doug's coming out speech to Nick was criticized by gay activists who objected to the father telling his son "some people think that it's [homosexuality] a sickness" and "if I had a choice, it isn't something I'd pick for myself." According to writer Richard Levinson, ABC insisted those lines be inserted. He said ABC felt that the film was taking a pro–homosexual stand and the opposing view had to be aired. Levinson said they strongly resisted and totally disagreed with their decision. Additionally, ABC insisted there be no physical contact between the lead actors, not even lingering eye contact.

In an interview with the Television Academy foundation, writer William Link said they first took the project to NBC, but they said "we wouldn't touch that with a ten foot pole, get out of here." When they took their script to Barry Diller, who created the ABC Movie of the Week, he said yes, but he had to "fight his own network to get it on." Link also reported that they could not get actors to play that part [Doug Salter], and when Cliff Robertson was approached about the role, he flatly stated, "I'd rather play Hitler than play that man." Link also said the night it was on, a bomb threat came in to an ABC affiliate.

== Cast ==
- Hal Holbrook as Doug Salter
- Martin Sheen as Gary McClain
- Scott Jacoby as Nick Salter
- Hope Lange as Janet Salter
- Joe Don Baker as Phil Bonner
- Marlyn Mason as Laureen Hyatt
- James McEachin as Mr. Early, the Conductor

== Principal production credits ==
- Producers: Richard Levinson, William Link
- Original music: Gil Mellé
- Cinematography: Vilis Lapenieks
- Art Direction: William D. DeCinces

== Critical reception ==
Marilyn Beck called it "one of the finest pieces of drama you'll see this year on large or small screen." Out Magazine said the film was "the first television-movie to offer a sympathetic portrayal of homosexuality, and with an all-star cast of Hal Holbrook and Martin Sheen, it was a pretty big deal."

Diane Trzcinski wrote in The Lesbian Tide, "this movie explored its subject with sensitivity and honesty. The situation is one that is painfully all too common: a homosexual parent who somehow has to explain to his child the facts of a sexual preference which is a taboo in our society...there were few slick cliches, and perhaps because of the quality of the cast, no glib acting".

Television critic for The New York Times John J. O'Connor observed, the movie "is not 'about' homosexuality. It is about personal relationships being affected by the fact of homosexuality. In terms of average television, however, it is something of a major event. The performances throughout the film are excellent"...and the movie "can lay claim to some of the most impressive and sensitive acting ever contributed to television".

Gay historian Stephen Tropiano wrote in his book The Prime Time Closet: A History of Gays and Lesbians on TV that the movie "broke new ground by portraying homosexuals as real people, rather than one-dimensional stereotypes. How honestly and accurately the film reflected gay life in America is certainly debatable, but there's a more important question: who exactly is the film's intended audience? Clearly, it was not male couples living in San Francisco, but heterosexuals who have never met a gay person that hopefully gained some new insight into gay male relationships and the emotional struggle many gay people endure as they seek acceptance from loved ones."

Film critic Charles Champlin praised the movie for "avoiding melodrama, moralizing or convenient resolutions, and it "would do honor to any size screen."

== Awards and nominations ==
Award	Category	Nominee(s)	Result	Ref.
American Cinema Editors Awards	Best Edited Television Special	Edward M. Abroms	Nominated	
Directors Guild of America Awards	Outstanding Directorial Achievement in Movies for Television	Lamont Johnson	Won	
Golden Globe Awards	Best Television Film		Won	
Primetime Emmy Awards	Outstanding Single Program – Drama or Comedy	Richard Levinson and William Link	Nominated	
Primetime Emmy Awards	Outstanding Single Performance by an Actor in a Leading Role	Hal Holbrook	Nominated	
Primetime Emmy Awards	Outstanding Single Performance by an Actress in a Leading Role	Hope Lange	Nominated	
Primetime Emmy Awards	Outstanding Performance by an Actor in a Supporting Role in a Drama	Scott Jacoby	Won	
Primetime Emmy Awards	Outstanding Directorial Achievement in Drama – A Single Program	Lamont Johnson	Nominated	
Primetime Emmy Awards	Outstanding Writing Achievement in Drama – Original Teleplay	Richard Levinson and William Link	Nominated	
Primetime Emmy Awards	Outstanding Achievement in Film Sound Mixing	Melvin M. Metcalfe and Thom K. Piper	Nominated	
Producers Guild of America Awards	Hall of Fame – Television Programs	Richard Levinson and William Link	Won	

== Legacy ==
In 1998, the movie was honored with the Hall of Fame Award at the Producers Guild of America Awards.

In 2014, The Paley Center For Media added the movie to its media collection in celebration of television's impact on LGBT equality. The center noted the movie's success at "educating and enlightening a select few and giving others a little bit of hope", and also "demonstrated the more progressive element of television".

== See also ==
- List of made-for-television films with LGBT characters
- Lists of television programs with LGBT characters
