= Stephen Elliott (actor) =

American actor (1918–2005)

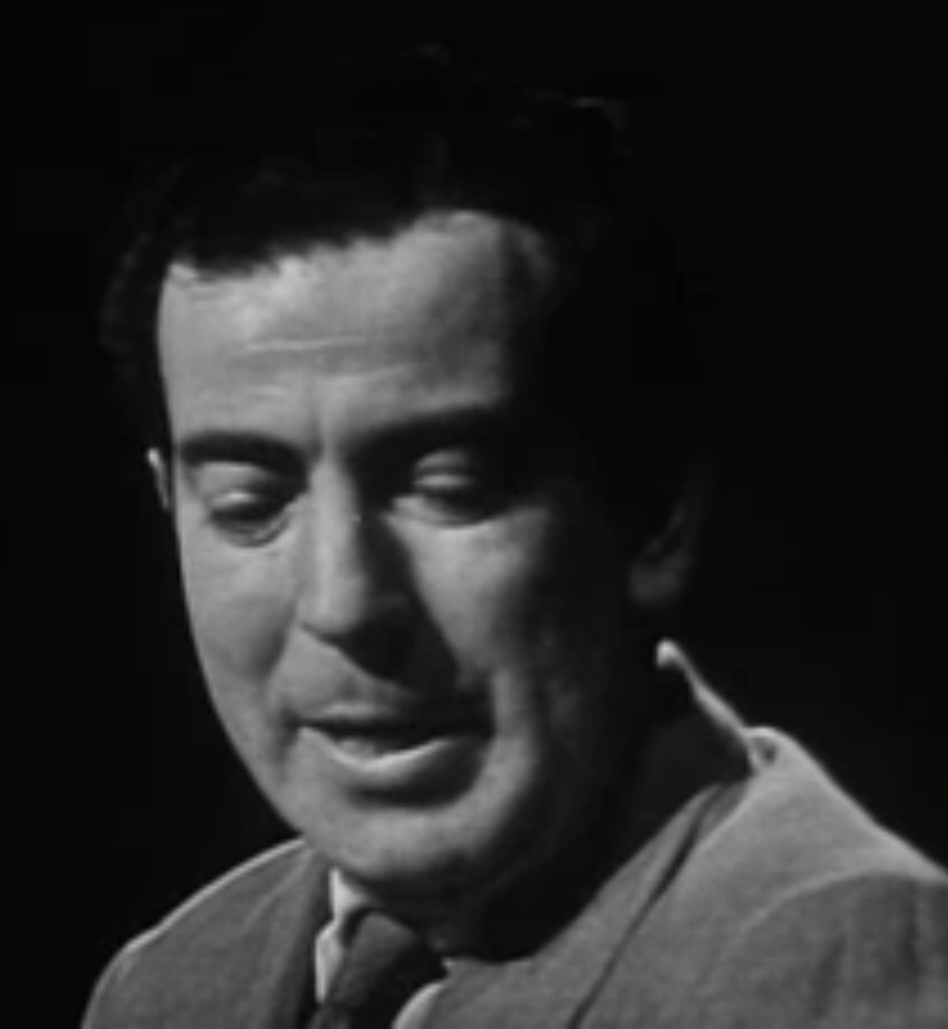
- Stephen Elliott appearing in Tales of Tomorrow, 1952
- Born: Elliott Pershing Stitzel; November 27, 1918; New York City, U.S.
- Died: May 21, 2005 (aged 86); Woodland Hills, Los Angeles, California, U.S.
- Other names: Stephen Elliot; Steve Elliott
- Occupation: Actor
- Years active: 1946–1999
- Spouses: Nancy Chase (m. 1947; div. 1960) Alice Hirson (m. 1980)
- Children: 2

Elliott Pershing Stitzel (November 27, 1918 – May 21, 2005), better known by his stage name Stephen Elliott, was an American actor. His best known roles were that of the prospective father-in-law, Burt Johnson, in the hit 1981 film Arthur and as Chief Hubbard in the 1984 blockbuster Beverly Hills Cop.

== Career ==
=== Theatre ===
From 1940 to 1942, Elliott studied acting with Sanford Meisner at New York's Neighborhood Playhouse. After serving in World War II with the United States Merchant Marine, he started a successful career on Broadway with his debut in Shakespeare's The Tempest; two years later, Elliott was selected by Robert Lewis to be one of The Actors Studio's founding members.

In 1967, Elliott was nominated for the Tony Award for Best Featured Actor in a Play for Marat/Sade. Two years later, he won the Drama Desk Award for A Whistle in the Dark. Additional Broadway credits include King Lear, The Miser, Georgy, The Crucible, and The Creation of the World and Other Business.

=== Television ===
Elliott's television credits include the role of Jane Wyman's first husband, newspaper publisher Douglas Channing, in Falcon Crest, General Padget in Columbo, Harold W. Smith in the 1988 television adaptation of Remo Williams, Texan millionaire attorney Scotty Demarest in Dallas, and Judge Harold Aldrich in Chicago Hope. He also appeared in the "Murder! Murder!" episode of The Eddie Capra Mysteries. In 1981 he had a small role as the newspaper magnate William Randolph Hearst in the TV serial Winston Churchill: The Wilderness Years. Elliott appeared in the Highway To Heaven episodes "Thoroughbreds: Part 1" and "Thoroughbreds: Part 2" with Helen Hunt and Michael Landon in 1985. He was a member of the regular cast of the short-lived 1988 situation comedy Trial and Error.

=== Radio ===
In 1981, Elliott played the role of Bail Organa, father of Princess Leia, in the radio drama adaptation of Star Wars.

== Personal life and death ==
Elliott was born Elliott Pershing Stitzel in New York City. His marriage to Barbara Blaise was terminated by divorce in February 1947, according to The Kingston Daily Freeman (Kingston, NY), 4 October 1947, page 3. He married stage actress Nancy Chase on 9 October 1947 (Billboard, 18 October 1947, p. 47) and divorced in 1960. They had two children, Jency and Jon.

He married his third wife, actress Alice Hirson, in 1980; they met on Broadway in 1964. Hirson appeared for several seasons in a recurring role as Mavis Anderson, close friend of Ellie Ewing Farlow, on the television series Dallas, although her character never interacted with Elliot’s Scotty Demerest.

Elliott died in 2005 in Woodland Hills, California as result of congestive heart failure.

== Filmography ==
Year	Title	Role	Notes
1954	Three Hours to Kill	Sheriff Ben East	
1955	Canyon Crossroads	Larson	
1956	The Proud and Profane		
1957	Street of Sinners	Harry	Bit part
1971	The Hospital	Dr. Sundstrom	
1974	Death Wish	Police Commissioner	
1974	The Gun	Art Hilliard	
1975	Report to the Commissioner	Police Commissioner	
1975	The Hindenburg	Captain Fellows	
1981	Cutter's Way	J.J. Cord	
1981	Arthur	Burt Johnson	
1984	Beverly Hills Cop	Chief Hubbard	
1984	Roadhouse 66	Sam	
1984	Vultures	Theatre Attendant	
1987	Assassination	Fitzroy	
1987	Walk Like a Man	Walter Welmont	
1988	Arthur 2: On the Rocks	Burt Johnson	
1990	Taking Care of Business	Walter	

== Television ==
Year	Title	Role	Notes
1953	Monodrama Theater		3 episodes
1975	Kojak	Tyler Meadows	Episode: "Elegy in an Asphalt Graveyard"
1975, 1989	Columbo	Carl Donner/General Padget	2 episodes
1977	The Bionic Woman	Duke	Episode: "Iron Ships and Dead Men"
1977	The Six Million Dollar Man	Morgan Grayland	Episode: "Sharks"
1977	The Court-Martial of George Armstrong Custer	Major General Schofield	TV film
1977	Young Joe, the Forgotten Kennedy	Joseph Kennedy, Sr	TV film
1978	Hawaii Five-O	Enslow	Episode: "Deadly Courier"
1980–1987	Dallas	Attorney Scotty Demerest	14 episodes
1981	Taxi	Ed McKenzie	Episode: "Thy Boss' Wife"
1981	Winston Churchill: The Wilderness Years	William Randolph Hearst	Episode: "Down and Out"
1981–1982	Falcon Crest	Douglas Channing	9 episodes
1982	Little House on the Prairie	Spencer Hollingsworth	Episode: "The Empire Builders"
1982	Magnum, P.I	Rear Admiral Philip Wheeler	Episode: "Almost Home"
1982	My Body, My Child	Edgar	TV film
1983	Remington Steele	Norman Baines	Episode: "My Fair Steele"
1983	Prototype	Dr. Arthur Jarrett	TV film
1984	St. Elsewhere	Manny Schecter	8 episodes
1984–1986	Benson	Whitley Endicott	2 episodes
1985	Murder, She Wrote	Dr. Sam	Episode: "Armed Response"
1985	The Fall Guy	Colonel Payne	Episode: "Femme Fatale"
1987	Perry Mason: The Case of the Lost Love	Eliott Moore	TV film
1988	Trial and Error	Edmund Kittle	Miniseries
1988	Remo Williams: The Prophecy	Harold W. Smith	TV film
1989	When He's Not a Stranger	Attorney Forster	TV film
1990	The Big One: The Great Los Angeles Earthquake	Owen	TV film
1991, 1992	Law & Order	Judge Neil Markham/Dr. Hogan	2 episodes
1994–1999	Chicago Hope	Judge Harold Aldrich	10 episodes
