= Ellery Queen (TV series) =

American mystery television series

- Main title design: Jack Cole & N. Lee Lacy
- Genre: Mystery; Drama
- Based on: Ellery Queen novels by Ellery Queen
- Developed by: Richard Levinson; William Link
- Starring: Jim Hutton; David Wayne; Tom Reese
- Theme music composer: Elmer Bernstein
- Composers: Elmer Bernstein; Dana Kaproff
- Country of origin: United States
- Original language: English
- No. of seasons: 1
- No. of episodes: 22 + pilot (list of episodes)

Production
- Executive producers: Richard Levinson; William Link
- Producers: Peter S. Fischer; Michael Rhodes
- Camera setup: Single-camera
- Running time: 44–48 minutes
- Production companies: Fairmount/Foxcroft Productions; Tom Ward Enterprises; Universal Television

Original release
- Network: NBC
- Release: September 11, 1975 – April 4, 1976

Ellery Queen is an American TV drama series, developed by Richard Levinson and William Link, who based it on the fictional character of the same name. The series ran for a single season on NBC from September 11, 1975, to April 4, 1976. Jim Hutton stars as the eponymous sleuth, along with David Wayne as his father, Inspector Richard Queen.

Each episode revolves around author Queen investigating a murder, usually with the assistance of his father. The series uses some of the same dramatic devices found in the early Queen novels and radio shows. This includes Hutton breaking the fourth wall, to challenge the viewer to solve the mystery.

== Plot ==
Set in post-World War II New York City (the first episode is set on New Year's Eve of 1946) the show revolved around author and amateur detective Ellery Queen (Jim Hutton), a bachelor who lives with his widowed father, Inspector Richard Queen (David Wayne). Ellery solves cases while writing his latest book, usually with assistance from his father, and Inspector Queen's right-hand-man, Sergeant Velie (Tom Reese).

Similar to the early Queen books and radio episodes, the audience is challenged to solve the mystery. For the television series, this led to Hutton breaking the fourth wall before the confrontation scene. This gave the viewers a short exposition about the case, and leaving the viewer to put together the clues.

The final act always used the detective cliché of calling together all the suspects, with Ellery Queen presenting the solution (except in one episode when the elder Queen took over). The great detective's detailed exposition allowed audience members to assess how they had guessed right and wrong. In some episodes, Queen's explanation disproved the theory of a rival sleuth.

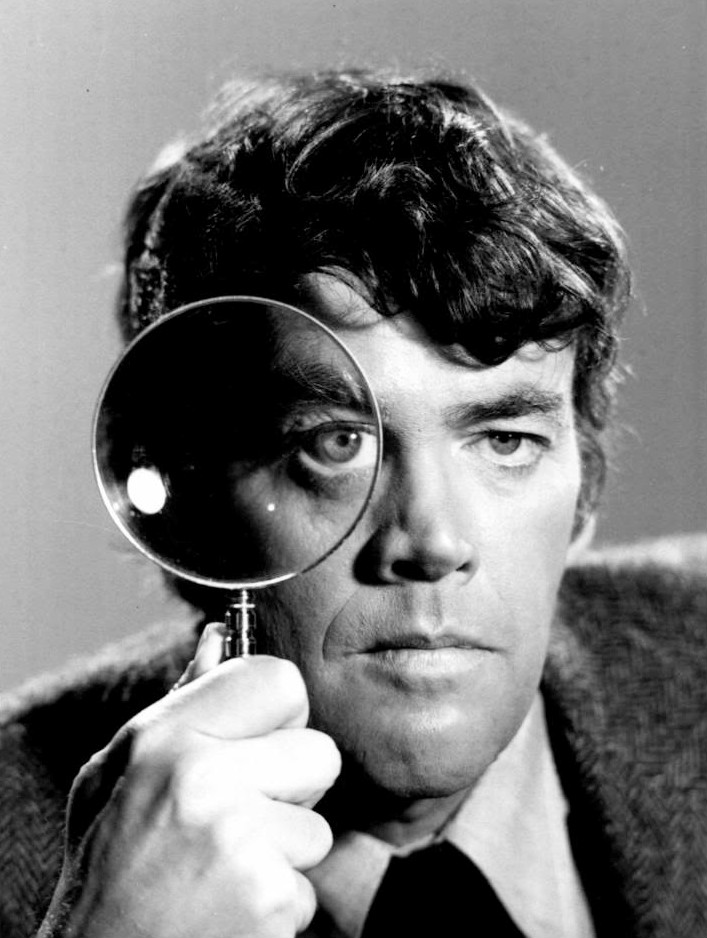
Jim Hutton as Ellery Queen

The series departed from the original stories in two respects. An element of mild humour was added by making the Ellery Queen character slightly physically clumsy, and the character of rival radio detective Simon Brimmer (John Hillerman) was created for the series.

== Cast ==
- Jim Hutton as Ellery Queen
- David Wayne as Inspector Richard Queen
- Tom Reese as Sgt. Thomas Velie

=== Recurring ===
- John Hillerman as Simon Brimmer, a radio host and Queen's frenemy. He frequently competes with Ellery, and jumps to conclusions about the murderer based on one piece of minor evidence.
- Ken Swofford as Frank Flannigan, a reporter who competes with Queen on several cases.
- Nina Roman as Grace, Inspector Queen's secretary.
- Arch Johnson as Deputy Commissioner Hayes, Inspector Queen's boss.
- Maggie Nelson as Vera, Frank Flannigan's secretary.

=== Guest stars ===
- Julie Adams
- Rene Auberjonois
- Don Ameche
- Dana Andrews
- Eve Arden
- Jim Backus
- Ken Berry
- Lloyd Bochner
- Tom Bosley
- George Burns
- Gretchen Corbett
- Joan Collins
- William Demarest
- Troy Donohue
- Rhonda Fleming
- Anne Francis
- Eva Gabor
- Lynda Day George
- Larry Hagman
- Pat Harrington
- Rosanna Huffman
- Robert Loggia
- Guy Lombardo
- Ida Lupino
- Nan Martin
- Roddy McDowall
- Ed McMahon
- Vera Miles
- Ray Milland
- Sal Mineo
- Dina Merrill
- Donald O'Connor
- Bert Parks
- Walter Pidgeon
- Vincent Price
- Pernell Roberts
- Cesar Romero
- Barbara Rush
- Dean Stockwell
- Dee Wallace
- Ray Walston
- Betty White

== Production ==
Richard Levinson and William Link had previously written a pilot based on the Ellery Queen character, Ellery Queen: Don't Look Behind You, also produced by Universal. The pilot, directed by Barry Shear, aired as a television movie on NBC on November 19, 1971. Peter Lawford and Harry Morgan had portrayed Ellery and Inspector Queen, respectively, with E. G. Marshall and Stefanie Powers in co-starring roles, and Bill Zuckert as Sgt. Velie. However, Levinson and Link did not like the changes to the script made by producer Leonard Ackerman, and used the pseudonym Ted Leighton as the credited writer. NBC did not order a series from this pilot.

In 1974, Levinson and Link retooled their idea into a new pilot, this time with Jim Hutton and David Wayne as Ellery and Inspector Queen. A television pilot premiered on March 23, 1975, with the made-for-TV movie Ellery Queen: Too Many Suspects. Levinson and Link adapted the script from the 1965 Ellery Queen novel The Fourth Side of the Triangle. NBC ordered a series based on the pilot in May 1975.

A single season of 22 episodes followed. The theme music was by Elmer Bernstein. The last episode aired on April 4, 1976, after which NBC cancelled the series. The series ranked 68 out of 97 shows that season. Levinson and Link later retooled the idea of an author and amateur sleuth who solves murders into the CBS series, Murder, She Wrote.

=== Reception ===
Richard Schickel, reviewing the series at its premiere in September 1975, called it "a garage-sale period piece"; he said "the presence of Guy Lombardo, some ancient autos and the oldest of detective story conventions (all suspects are assembled in one room to await the results of the detective's ratiocinations) are supposed to evoke nostalgia. They do not—and the format's stasis is numbing."

In 1979, Levinson and Link won a Special Edgar Award for creating the Columbo and Ellery Queen TV series.

== Episodes ==
No.	Title	Directed by	Written by	Original release date
0	Ellery Queen: Too Many Suspects	David Greene	Richard Levinson and William Link	March 23, 1975
98-minute pilot: When a famous fashion designer is found murdered, Inspector Richard Queen of the NYPD is baffled by her dying clue (she pulled the plugs for her clock and TV set out of the wall at exactly 10:25 PM), prompting him to bring in his son, mystery writer Ellery Queen, to help in the investigation.
1	"The Adventure of Auld Lang Syne"	David Greene	S : Richard Levinson and William Link; S/T : Peter S. Fischer	September 11, 1975
Soon after a wealthy industrialist threatens to disinherit family and staff at a 1947 New Year's Eve party, he is found murdered in a nearby phone booth by fellow guest Inspector Queen, who calls on son Ellery to help unmask the killer.
2	"The Adventure of the Lover's Leap"	Charles S. Dubin	Robert Pirosh	September 18, 1975
When an heiress is found dead from an apparent suicide, Ellery Queen suspects she was murdered, but the investigation is hindered by interference from radio detective Simon Brimmer.
3	"The Adventure of the Chinese Dog"	Ernest Pintoff	S : Gene Thompson; T : Robert van Scoyk	September 25, 1975
A fishing trip for Richard and Ellery Queen soon becomes a working vacation when they are asked to help investigate the murder of a small-town magnate who was whacked over the head with an ornamental dog figurine.
4	"The Adventure of the Comic Book Crusader"	Peter H. Hunt	Robert van Scoyk	October 2, 1975
A tyrannical comic book creator is shot to death in his office, and Ellery Queen becomes the prime suspect because of arguments over how he was portrayed in the victim's comics.
5	"The Adventure of the 12th Floor Express"	Jack Arnold	David H. Balkan and Alan Folsom	October 9, 1975
Inspector Queen calls in his son Ellery to help investigate the murder of a newspaper publisher, who first disappears from his private express elevator and then is later found there dead by gunshot.
6	"The Adventure of Miss Aggie's Farewell Performance"	James Sheldon	S : Richard Levinson and William Link; S/T : Peter S. Fischer	October 16, 1975
Beloved Vera Bethune stars as Miss Aggie in a radio soap opera, but is about to be written out. One day she drinks water from a jug and is poisoned in a murder attempt. She is taken to the hospital and survives, but the killer returns.
7	"The Adventure of Colonel Nivin's Memoirs"	Seymour Robbie	Robert E. Swanson	October 23, 1975
Ellery's publicist becomes embroiled in a murder investigation when she finds the body of one of her clients, a World War II spy who recently wrote a tell-all memoir.
8	"The Adventure of the Mad Tea Party"	James Sheldon	S : Ellery Queen; T : Peter S. Fischer	October 30, 1975
Fun-loving theatrical producer Spencer Lockridge invites Ellery to his mansion for a weekend of working out how to adapt one of Ellery's works for the stage. But the producer disappears shortly thereafter, and presumed murdered. A series of clues are delivered by pranksters' means. The idea is to try to get the killer to implicate himself or herself.
9	"The Adventure of Veronica's Veils"	Seymour Robbie	Robert Pirosh	November 13, 1975
Burlesque producer Sam Packer is found dead of an apparent heart attack but he leaves behind a cine film to be shown at his funeral in which he states that, no matter what it looks like, he will have been murdered.
10	"The Adventure of the Pharaoh's Curse"	Seymour Robbie	S : Rudolph Borchert; T : Peter S. Fischer	December 11, 1975
Much-hated museum benefactor Norris Wentworth is found dead in the museum. The autopsy indicates he died of a heart attack, but did he have help in dying? He was let into the museum by somebody and couldn't reach his nitroglycerin medicine, indicating that whoever let him in also intimidated him. An Egyptologist shows up and claims that the piece, a pharaoh's tomb, was stolen from Egypt and vows that a curse has been laid upon the tomb to haunt anyone who robs it.
11	"The Adventure of the Blunt Instrument"	Ernest Pintoff	Story by : Robert van Scoyk; S/T : Michael Robert David	December 18, 1975
Edgar Manning, a mystery writer, wins the annual Blunt Instrument Award for his year's work and celebrates with a party at his residence. Ellery, who was Edgar's rival for the award, is sidelined because of a nasty cold. So Edgar gleefully phones Ellery and gives a blow-by-blow description of the award ceremony (including describing the trophy) as he leans back in his easy chair. But the phone call is interrupted by a sickening thud. Ellery calls out to Edgar but gets no response. Cut back to Edgar, who's now face down on his desk. His skull was shattered by... The Blunt Instrument, the trophy itself.
12	"The Adventure of the Black Falcon"	Walter Doniger	Marc B. Ray	January 4, 1976
Letting a fine wine "breathe" proves deadly for the wine's owner Nick Kingston, who leaves it unattended for a killer to poison it. The vintner, who's hosting a party upstairs, comes back only to collapse. He tries to implicate the killer but breaks the wine cellar's only pencil, so he crawls to a wine rack and grabs a bottle, smashing it on the floor. The shattered bottle bears the label Black Falcon, indicating it was tied to World War One. But how?
13	"The Adventure of the Sunday Punch"	Seymour Robbie	Larry Alexander	January 11, 1976
During a practice bout, a lucky shot knocks champion boxer Kid Hogan unconscious. He revives enough to sip some water from his manager's "swill bottle," then falls comatose and is soon pronounced dead. An autopsy reveals he was poisoned, and the "swill bottle" was loaded with poison. The manager is strongly implicated, but so is the opponent Joe Simpson.
14	"The Adventure of the Eccentric Engineer"	Peter H. Hunt	David P. Lewis and Booker Bradshaw	January 18, 1976
Lamont Franklin, a once brilliant but now seemingly senile inventor, is murdered in his electric train workshop. It appears as though no one could have entered or left the workshop during the time in which the murder must have taken place.
15	"The Adventure of the Wary Witness"	Walter Doniger	Peter S. Fischer	January 25, 1976
Linville Hagen, on trial for murder, claims that the victim Nick Danello was shot through a window from a fire escape, and that Hagen fired at the killer. The defendant's lawyer Leo Campbell claims that he can bring in a witness, a woman who was beaten up by the victim. But the woman can't be found. When she's finally tracked down, Inspector Queen, Ellery and Frank Flannigan hear a gunshot from outside her window, break down the door and find the woman lying unconscious — shot from the fire escape.
16	"The Adventure of the Judas Tree"	Walter Doniger	Martin Roth	February 1, 1976
Someone makes the murder of wealthy George Sherman look like a ritualistic killing, hanging his corpse from a Cercis tree (aka a Judas tree) and adorning it with branches. When George is found to be far less wealthy than thought (he had given everything away except a huge life insurance policy), suspicion turns to his wife Paulette, who already has a boyfriend on the side.
17	"The Adventure of the Sinister Scenario"	Peter H. Hunt	Robert Pirosh	February 8, 1976
Gil Mallory, an actor playing Ellery Queen in a motion picture, is supposed to be shot on camera, then jump up and nab the woman who shot him, exclaiming "Bulletproof vest!" The rehearsal with blanks goes fine. But the ensuing take with the same gun finds it loaded with real bullets, and Mallory drops dead. The film crew tries to carry on, and soon stunt man Mike Hewitt is killed when the car he was driving is rigged to wipe out before he was ready. Are the two murders linked — and how?
18	"The Adventure of the Two-Faced Woman"	Jack Arnold	Robert E. Swanson	February 29, 1976
Simon Brimmer once again fingers the wrong culprit in this tale about the murder of a socialite who was apparently leading a double life. The case has its underpinnings in events that happened in 1922 France.
19	"The Adventure of the Tyrant of Tin Pan Alley"	Seymour Robbie	Robert van Scoyk	March 7, 1976
The radio payola scandals of the 1940s and '50s are recalled when popular songwriter Alvin Winer is murdered during the musical interlude on a radio show when he goes to the station's record library to find a record. Ellery must clear a friend who had just accused Winer of stealing his song.
20	"The Adventure of Caesar's Last Sleep"	Richard Michaels	S : Michael Rhodes; T : Rudolph Borchert	March 14, 1976
Inspector Queen is in charge of protecting mob witness Ralph Caesar, but the witness is murdered before he can testify. The evidence points to none other than Sgt. Velie. The Inspector must also deal with rivals in the department who feel he's gotten long in the tooth and relies too much on Ellery.
21	"The Adventure of the Hardhearted Huckster"	Edward M. Abroms	S : Lewis Davidson; S/T : Robert E. Swanson	March 21, 1976
Madison Avenue advertising executive James Bevin Long wants to make newspaper columnist Frank Flanagan a TV star by setting him up with a variety show. But then Long is murdered in his private bathroom, stabbed in the back. The killer had to be someone who knew Long's meticulous habits. The plans for the TV show go forward and Ellery takes an inside look at the advertising industry to determine how the killer could have slipped in and out undetected.
22	"The Adventure of the Disappearing Dagger"	Jack Arnold	Story by : Robert van Scoyk; S/T : Stephen Lord	April 4, 1976
An elderly amateur criminologist finally figures out how a five-year-old "locked-room" murder was committed, and is murdered by the killer before he can alert Inspector Queen. Ellery takes up the challenge himself. The criminologist had first implicated an airline pilot, because he was flying the plane where the murder was committed and had the opportunity to toss the murder weapon out the window. Nobody else seems to have been able to get rid of the weapon, but Ellery finds that the murder victim had stolen someone else's invention, and that the murderer may have invented the weapon as well.

== Home media ==
The series, including the pilot, was released on DVD - in Australia (region 4, PAL) on 15 September 2010 and in the US by Entertainment One (region 1, NTSC) on September 28, 2010. The Australian release also includes Ellery Queen: Don't Look Behind You. In 2016, the complete series of Ellery Queen was released on DVD in the UK. This release does not include Ellery Queen: Don't Look Behind You.
