= The Judge and Jake Wyler =

- Genre: Drama
- Written by: Richard Levinson; William Link; David Shaw
- Directed by: David Lowell Rich
- Starring: Bette Davis; Doug McClure; Eric Braeden
- Theme music composer: Gil Melle
- Country of origin: United States
- Original language: English

Production
- Producers: Richard Levinson; William Link
- Production locations: Universal Studios - 100 Universal City Plaza, Universal City, California
- Cinematography: William Margulies
- Editor: Buddy Small
- Running time: 120 min.
- Production company: Universal Television

Original release
- Network: NBC
- Release: December 2, 1972

The Judge and Jake Wyler is a 1972 American TV movie directed by David Lowell Rich. The teleplay was written by Richard Levinson, William Link, and David Shaw. It was produced by Universal Television and broadcast by NBC on December 2, 1972.

The title characters are a hypochondriac former judge who owns a private detective agency and her parolee partner. The two are hired by Alicia Dodd to investigate the alleged suicide of her father, whom she suspects was really a murder victim.

== Production notes ==
The film was a pilot for a proposed weekly series that failed to make the network's schedule. Earlier that year, Bette Davis had starred in Madame Sin, a pilot for ABC that also failed to sell.

In 1973, the character of Judge Meredith resurfaced in the form of Lee Grant in the TV movie Partners in Crime, scripted by Shaw and directed by Jack Smight. This, too, was a pilot that went no further than its initial airing.

The premise returned as “Hardcastle and McCormick” which aired on ABC from September 18, 1983, through May 5, 1986. The series starred Brian Keith as Judge Milton C. Hardcastle and Daniel Hugh Kelly as ex-con and race car driver Mark "Skid" McCormick.

== Cast ==
- Bette Davis as Judge Meredith
- Doug McClure as Jake Wyler
- Eric Braeden as Anton Granicek
- Joan Van Ark as Alicia Dodd
- Gary Conway as Frank Morrison
- Lou Jacobi as Lieutenant Wolfson
- Kent Smith as Robert Dodd

== Principal production credits ==
- Producers: Jay Benson, Richard Levinson, William Link
- Original Music: Gil Melle
- Cinematography: William Margulies
- Art Direction: Alexander A. Mayer
- Costume Design: Burton Miller
