= Rollercoaster (1977 film) =

1977 American disaster-suspense film directed by James Goldstone

- Promotional poster of Rollercoaster
- Directed by: James Goldstone
- Written by: Richard Levinson; William Link
- Story by: Sanford Sheldon; Richard Levinson; William Link; Tommy Cook
- Produced by: Jennings Lang
- Starring: George Segal; Richard Widmark; Timothy Bottoms; Harry Guardino; Susan Strasberg; Henry Fonda
- Cinematography: David M. Walsh
- Edited by: Edward A. Biery; Richard M. Sprague
- Music by: Lalo Schifrin
- Distributed by: Universal Pictures
- Release date: June 10, 1977
- Running time: 119 minutes
- Country: United States
- Language: English
- Budget: $9 million
- Box office: $8.2 million

Rollercoaster is a 1977 American disaster-suspense film directed by James Goldstone and starring George Segal, Richard Widmark, Henry Fonda and Timothy Bottoms. It was one of the few films to be shown in Sensurround, which used extended-range bass frequencies to give a sense of vibration to the viewers during the coaster rides.

== Plot ==
An unnamed man sneaks into Ocean View Amusement Park and places a small radio-controlled bomb on the tracks of the park's wooden roller coaster, The Rocket. The bomb detonates, causing the ride's train to derail, killing or injuring the riders as a result. Safety inspector Harry Calder, who initially cleared the ride, is called to the park to investigate. A park worker tells Calder that he saw what he thought was a park maintenance man up on the tracks earlier that day, but there is no record of anyone being assigned there.

The bomber causes a fire on a dark ride at another park in Pittsburgh. Calder suspects the incidents might be linked, and learns that the executives of companies running the largest amusement parks in America are holding a meeting in Chicago. Calder flies to Chicago and intrudes on the meeting. One of the executives plays a tape sent by the bomber, wherein he demands $1 million to stop his activities.

Back home, Calder is visited by FBI Agent Hoyt, who says the extortion money is to be delivered by Calder at Kings Dominion. There, Calder is ordered to wait at a public telephone. The bomber calls and warns him there is a bomb in the park. He sends Calder a two-way radio so that he can keep contact, then orders Calder to go on various rides in the park, such as the Rebel Yell roller coaster. While Calder is riding on the Skyway, the bomber tells Calder that the bomb is located in the radio. He warns Calder not to throw it away, because it will explode on impact on the paths below, which are occupied by many of the park's visitors. He orders Calder to falsely signal that he has made the delivery in order to distract the FBI, then leave the money on a bench. Calder complies and walks away. Later, Hoyt admits that he marked the money (violating the bomber's instructions). Calder demands to be sent home and leaves the bomb radio with the bomb squad.

Back home, Calder gets another call from the bomber. He blames Calder for the marked money and threatens another attack. Assuming it will be directed at himself personally, Calder deduces that the next target will be Revolution at Magic Mountain. The FBI rejects Calder's hypothesis but decides to investigate anyway because the ride is scheduled to debut on July 4, when park attendance will be at its highest for the season. Agents disguised as park maintenance men eventually find a bomb attached to the tracks and disarm it.

The bomber returns to his car and gets a new bomb just as the Revolution is about to open. In order to get on board, he pays a park guest $100 for his "Gold Ticket", which entitles the holder to be one of the first passengers. He places the bomb under his seat in the rear of the train. Following the inaugural ride, Calder recognizes the bomber's voice during his ride exit interview with a reporter. He chases the bomber and alerts the agents that he might have placed something in the coaster train. The train leaves the chain lift on its second ride through.

The bomber is eventually cornered and threatens to blow up the ride, holding the detonator in his hand while the agents try to jam the signal. He demands a firearm. Calder takes one from an agent and begins to hand it to him. Agents succeed in jamming the detonator's signal and alert Calder. Calder retains the gun but in doing so accidentally shoots the bomber, who then runs away. He hops a fence into the area below the Revolution and runs blindly, eventually circling back toward Calder. The bomber climbs onto the track but sees Calder and freezes. He is hit and killed by the coaster train. The ride reopens following the accident.

== Cast ==
- George Segal as Harry Calder
- Richard Widmark as Agent Thomas Hoyt
- Timothy Bottoms as Young Man
- Henry Fonda as Simon Davenport
- Harry Guardino as Lt. Keefer
- Susan Strasberg as Fran
- Dorothy Tristan as Helen
- Helen Hunt as Tracy Calder
- Wayne Tippit as Christie
- Michael Bell as Chuck Demerest
- Craig Wasson as Hippie
- William Prince as Quinlan
- Robert Quarry as Mayor
- Monica Lewis as Tourist Mother
- Dick Wesson as Tourist Father
- Charlie Tuna as Rock Concert MC
- Ron Mael and Russell Mael as themselves/"Sparks"
- Steve Guttenberg as Messenger (uncredited)
- Henry “Hank” Mauro as Insurance Adjuster (uncredited)

== Production ==
This was the third film to be presented in Sensurround. Special low-frequency bass speakers were used during the roller coaster sequences. Sensurround was employed in only three other films released by Universal: Earthquake (1974), Midway (1976) and the theatrical version of Battlestar Galactica (1978).

"Sensurround is as big a star as there is in movies today," said Sidney Sheinberg, head of MCA, who attributed the better-than-expected success of Earthquake and Midway at the box office to the device.

The film was announced in July 1976. Director James Goldstone said the film was "not a disaster movie but a Hitchcock-like suspense cat and mouse story".

=== Casting ===
George Segal's casting was announced in August 1976. He called it "simply an action-adventure, something Alfred Hitchcock would do, structured beautifully, and combined with Universal's technology". Goldstone said Segal had "that humanity factor and it does come through. George plays the Everyman character who is repeatedly dumped on but who's never a buffoon... He knows who he is and is therefore free to take chances, to try something new, to expose his vulnerability."

Opposite was Timothy Bottoms. "It's the first time I've ever played the villain," said Bottoms. Helen Hunt, in her first feature film, has a supporting role as Tracy Calder, Harry's teenage daughter. Steve Guttenberg, in his first film role, has an uncredited bit part as a messenger at Magic Mountain who brings the plans for the Revolution to Calder and Hoyt. Craig Wasson, in his second film, appears as a hippie. Radio announcer Charlie Tuna also appears in the film as the emcee for the concert and The Revolution coaster launch.

The film features an appearance by the band Sparks for the roller coaster's opening concert, playing the songs "Fill 'Er Up" and "Big Boy" from their 1976 album Big Beat. Sparks later cited their appearance in the film when asked about the biggest regret of their career.

=== Locations ===
Filming started September 13, 1976.

Several real amusement parks were used in the film for the various park and roller coaster scenes. Ocean View Park in Norfolk, Virginia, was used for the first park in the film. Although the park was located on the Chesapeake Bay, it was described as a west coast park in the film. Goldstone chose the park because of its old-fashioned feeling. The park's major wooden roller coaster, The Skyrocket, was renamed simply "The Rocket" for the film. Kings Dominion in Doswell, Virginia, also appeared in the film. Some of the rides featured in the film, such as the Shenandoah Lumber Company and Rebel Yell wooden roller coaster (renamed Racer 75), still exist today. The final park used was Magic Mountain (now called Six Flags Magic Mountain) in Valencia, California. The park's Great American Revolution roller coaster was featured prominently in the film's climax.

Originally, Kennywood was one of the locations to be used in the opening "crash" segment of the film. But after the park's owners declined their participation, the producers of the film ended up shooting the "Wonder World" segment at Kings Dominion instead.

According to Goldstone, the three parks that appeared in the final film were chosen from over 20 candidates.

Additionally, parts of the movie were filmed at the Hyatt Regency Chicago.

== Soundtrack ==
The film's musical score was written by composer Lalo Schifrin.

== Reception ==
=== Box office ===
It was released in the late spring of 1977 and was overshadowed by the smash hit Star Wars, resulting in financial disappointment, with Universal losing enthusiasm for Sensurround films as a result.

=== Critical ===
In a positive review, Vincent Canby of The New York Times called the film "effective pop entertainment that, like an amusement-park ride, deals in the sensation of suspense for the foolish fun of it". Charles Champlin of the Los Angeles Times also praised the film, stating that the film "is not so much a disaster story as an unexpectedly articulate and well-polished piece of cat-and-mouse suspense whose derivation is more from Hitchcock than, say, Irwin Allen".

Gene Siskel of the Chicago Tribune was less positive, giving the film 1½ stars out of 4 and called it "a traffic accident masquerading as a movie" with "one of the dullest villains imaginable". Kenneth Turan, then also of The Washington Post, stated, "I was going take the high road, be the Father Flanigan of film criticism, and say there is no such thing as a bad movie, that standards are relative, tastes differ. Then I saw 'Rollercoaster.' 'Rollercoaster,' slambang title notwithstanding, is a singularly tepid piece of work, so dull not even Sensurround can keep you fully awake. Yes, I cried when it was finally over, there is such a thing as a bad movie, and this is it. By the next morning, I'd calmed down, decided 'Rollercoaster' had its virtues after all, and was maybe even marginally entertaining."

Other reviews were split. Gary Arnold of The Washington Post wrote, "The Sensurround process, fundamentally unnecessary as it is, supplements the subjective visual thrills effectively." He added, "There's such a disparity of interest between the locations themselves and the melodramatic motions the actors are required to go through that one could easily believe Universal had a greater stake in the amusement park business than the movie business." Variety noted, "The rollercoaster rides are the picture’s highlights and they are fabulous." Time Out London felt that "the results should have been sensational", but that "ultimately the film-makers botched the job. Many of the best runs are interrupted by close-ups, and the filler plot is dumb in the extreme."

The film holds an approval rating of 53% on review aggregator website Rotten Tomatoes as of May 2023, based on 17 reviews.
