= Richard Levinson =

American screenwriter and producer (1934–1987)

- Born: Richard Leighton Levinson; August 7, 1934; Philadelphia, Pennsylvania, U.S.
- Died: March 12, 1987 (aged 52); Los Angeles, California, U.S.
- Resting place: Westwood Village Memorial Park
- Education: University of Pennsylvania
- Occupations: Screenwriter; producer
- Years active: 1946–1987
- Known for: Co-creator of Columbo; Murder, She Wrote; Mannix
- Spouse: Rosanna Huffman (m. 1969)
- Children: 1

Richard Leighton Levinson (August 7, 1934 – March 12, 1987) was an American screenwriter and producer who often worked in collaboration with William Link.

== Life and career ==
Levinson was born in Philadelphia, Pennsylvania. He attended the University of Pennsylvania, where he earned a Bachelor's Degree in Economics in 1956. He served in the United States Army from 1957 to 1958 and married actress Rosanna Huffman in 1969. Levinson was of Jewish heritage.

William Link and Richard Levinson began a 41-year friendship in 1946, on their first day of junior high school. Both were avid Ellery Queen fans from boyhood and enjoyed mental puzzles and challenges, a characteristic that would spill over into their work.

Beginning with radio scripts, the team wrote plays and then prime-time TV scripts. In 1965, they wrote three episodes of Honey West including the final episode. They went on to co-create and sometimes produce the detective television series Columbo, Mannix, Ellery Queen, Murder, She Wrote (with Peter S. Fischer), as well as made-for-TV movies The Gun, My Sweet Charlie, That Certain Summer, The Judge and Jake Wyler, The Execution of Private Slovik, Charlie Cobb: A Nice Night for a Hanging, Rehearsal for Murder, Guilty Conscience, and the short-lived TV series Blacke's Magic. The team were proud of creating "intelligent" rather than violent programs.

The partners also collaborated on two feature films, The Hindenburg (1975) and Rollercoaster (1977), and the Broadway show Merlin, featuring the magician Doug Henning.

The team occasionally used the pseudonym "Ted Leighton," drawn from each of their middles names—most notably on the telefilm Ellery Queen: Don't Look Behind You, (where their work was substantially rewritten by other screenwriters), and Columbo when they came up with stories to be scripted by their collaborators. They used the name as early as 1959 for short stories published in Alfred Hitchcock's Mystery Magazine when the magazine already contained stories appearing as by Levinson and Link. They also used the name for their contribution to the script for Steve McQueen's final movie, The Hunter.

In 1979, Levinson and Link received a Special Edgar Award from the Mystery Writers of America for their work on Ellery Queen and Columbo. During the 1980s, they were three-time winners of the Edgar for Best TV Feature or MiniSeries Teleplay, and in 1989 they were given the MWA's Ellery Queen Award, which honors outstanding mystery-writing teams. In November 1995, they were jointly elected to the Television Academy Hall of Fame.

== Death ==
Levinson died of a heart attack at his home in Brentwood, Los Angeles early on March 12, 1987. He was interred at Pierce Brothers Westwood Village Memorial Park and Mortuary. The first Murder, She Wrote spin-off novel, Gin and Daggers, is dedicated to his memory.

In tribute to Levinson, Link wrote the script for the 1991 TV film The Boys, starring James Woods and John Lithgow.

== Publications ==
- Levinson, Richard; Link, William (1983) [1981]. Stay Tuned: An Inside Look at the Making of Prime-Time Television. New York: Ace Books. ISBN 978-0441785469.
- Levinson, Richard; Link, William (1986). Off Camera: Conversations with the Makers of Prime-time Television. New York: New American Library. ISBN 9780452258730.

== Accolades ==
Awards and nominations
Year	Association	Category	Work	Result
1966	Edgar Awards	Best Episode in a TV Series	Honey West: "The Gray Lady"	Nominated
1970	Primetime Emmy Awards	Outstanding Dramatic Program	My Sweet Charlie	Nominated
1970	Primetime Emmy Awards	Outstanding Writing Achievement in Drama	My Sweet Charlie	Won
1972	Primetime Emmy Awards	Outstanding Drama Series	Columbo	Nominated
1972	Primetime Emmy Awards	Outstanding New Series	Columbo	Nominated
1972	Primetime Emmy Awards	Outstanding Writing Achievement in Drama	Columbo: "Death Lends a Hand"	Won
1973	Primetime Emmy Awards	Outstanding Single Program - Drama or Comedy	That Certain Summer	Nominated
1973	Primetime Emmy Awards	Outstanding Writing Achievement in Drama - Original Teleplay	That Certain Summer	Nominated
1973	Writers Guild of America Awards	Episodic Drama	Columbo: "Étude in Black"	Nominated
1974	Primetime Emmy Awards	Outstanding Special - Comedy or Drama	The Execution of Private Slovik	Nominated
1974	Primetime Emmy Awards	Best Writing in Drama - Adaptation	The Execution of Private Slovik	Nominated
1978	Primetime Emmy Awards	Outstanding Writing in a Special Program - Drama or Comedy - Original Teleplay	The Storyteller	Nominated
1980	Edgar Awards	Best Television Feature or Miniseries	Murder by Natural Causes	Won
1983	Edgar Awards	Best Television Feature or Miniseries	Rehearsal for Murder	Won
1985	CableACE Award	Movie or Miniseries	The Guardian	Nominated
1985	Primetime Emmy Awards	Outstanding Drama Series	Murder, She Wrote	Nominated
1986	Edgar Awards	Best Television Feature or Miniseries	Guilty Conscience	Won
1986	Writers Guild of America Awards	Laurel Award for TV Writing Achievement		Won

=== Posthumous ===
- 1999 - Producers Guild of America Hall of Fame – Television Programs for That Certain Summer
