= William Link =

American screenwriter and producer (1933–2020)

- Born: December 15, 1933; Philadelphia, Pennsylvania, U.S.
- Died: December 27, 2020 (aged 87); Los Angeles, California, U.S.
- Other names: William O. Link; Bill Link
- Education: University of Pennsylvania
- Occupations: Screenwriter, producer
- Known for: Co-creator of Columbo; Murder, She Wrote; Mannix
- Spouse: Margery Nelson (m. 1980)

William Theodore Link (December 15, 1933 – December 27, 2020) was an American film and television screenwriter and producer who often worked in collaboration with Richard Levinson.

== Biography ==
=== Early life ===
Born in Philadelphia, Pennsylvania, William Link was the son of Elsie (née Roerecke) and William Theodore Link, a textile broker. His mother had German Huguenot heritage. Link discovered late in life that his father's parents were Jewish. Link's niece, Amy, examined a suitcase William Theodore had left to his son, which they had kept in their attic. She opened it in 2011 and it turned out to contain genealogical research and evidence done by William Theodore during World War II. Amy had discovered that Link's paternal grandparents were Jewish. Link earned a degree from the University of Pennsylvania's Wharton School of Business prior to serving in the United States Army from 1956 to 1958.

=== Levinson partnership ===
William Link and Richard Levinson met on their first day of junior high school. Each had enjoyed doing magic tricks and other students repeatedly mentioned to each of them that they should meet. They began writing together soon after. In high school, they created radio scripts. While studying at the University of Pennsylvania, they wrote film criticism for the college newspapers. Some of their short stories were published in Playboy.

They sold their first short story, "Whistle While You Work", to Ellery Queen Mystery Magazine, which published it in the November 1954 issue. In 1959, their play Chain of Command was produced by the Westinghouse Desilu Playhouse. This was followed by script-writing for Alfred Hitchcock Presents (Day of Reckoning, original air date November 22, 1962, based on a novel by John Garde), Dr. Kildare, and The Fugitive. In 1965, they wrote three episodes of Honey West (TV series) including the final episode. They co-created and sometimes produced such TV series as Mannix in 1968, Columbo in 1969, Ellery Queen, and Murder, She Wrote (co-created with Peter S. Fischer). The character of Columbo was first introduced by Link and Levinson in a 1960 episode of The Chevy Mystery Show. For the Jessica Fletcher character they created in 1983 when CBS contacted them to create a new mystery TV show, they found inspiration in a mix of Agatha Christie and her Miss Marple character. At first, they wanted Jean Stapleton for the role, but she declined the offer.

They collaborated on several made-for-TV movies, including The Gun, My Sweet Charlie, That Certain Summer, The Judge and Jake Wyler, Guilty Conscience, The Execution of Private Slovik, Charlie Cobb: A Nice Night for a Hanging, and Blacke's Magic; the last, which starred Hal Linden and Harry Morgan, was also developed into a short-lived TV series. The partners collaborated, as well, on two feature films: The Hindenburg (1975) and Rollercoaster (1977). Levinson and Link occasionally used the pseudonym "Ted Leighton", most notably on the telefilm Ellery Queen: Don't Look Behind You (1971), where their work was substantially rewritten by other hands, and on Columbo when they came up with stories to be scripted by their collaborators.

They co-wrote the Broadway musical magic show Merlin starring Doug Henning and co-scripted the film The Execution of Private Slovik.

=== Post 1990s ===
Following the sudden death of Levinson in 1987, Link continued his writing and producing career in many media. In 1991, in tribute to Levinson, he wrote the script for the 1991 TV film The Boys, starring James Woods and John Lithgow. He was a frequent contributor to such mystery fiction publications as Ellery Queen's Mystery Magazine and Alfred Hitchcock's Mystery Magazine. His post-Levinson TV work includes The Cosby Mysteries (1994–95), starring Bill Cosby. Link also was executive story consultant on the short-lived science fiction/detective series Probe in 1988.

In 2010, the specialist mystery publishing house, Crippen & Landru, released The Columbo Collection, a book featuring a dozen original short stories about Lieutenant Columbo, all written by Link. In 2021, a further collection of stories, Shooting Script, was edited for C&L by Joseph Goodrich.

Link died from heart failure in Los Angeles, on December 27, 2020, twelve days after his 87th birthday.

== Accolades and honors ==
Link received the following awards and nominations jointly with Levinson :

Year	Association	Category	Work	Result
1966	Edgar Awards	Best Episode in a TV Series	Honey West: "The Gray Lady"	Nominated
1970	Primetime Emmy Awards	Outstanding Dramatic Program	My Sweet Charlie	Nominated
1970	Primetime Emmy Awards	Outstanding Writing Achievement in Drama	My Sweet Charlie	Won
1972	Primetime Emmy Awards	Outstanding Drama Series	Columbo	Nominated
1972	Primetime Emmy Awards	Outstanding New Series	Columbo	Nominated
1972	Primetime Emmy Awards	Outstanding Writing Achievement in Drama	Columbo: "Death Lends a Hand"	Won
1973	Primetime Emmy Awards	Outstanding Single Program - Drama or Comedy	That Certain Summer	Nominated
1973	Primetime Emmy Awards	Outstanding Writing Achievement in Drama - Original Teleplay	That Certain Summer	Nominated
1973	Writers Guild of America Awards	Episodic Drama	Columbo: "Étude in Black"	Nominated
1974	Primetime Emmy Awards	Outstanding Special - Comedy or Drama	The Execution of Private Slovik	Nominated
1974	Primetime Emmy Awards	Best Writing in Drama - Adaptation	The Execution of Private Slovik	Nominated
1978	Primetime Emmy Awards	Outstanding Writing in a Special Program - Drama or Comedy - Original Teleplay	The Storyteller	Nominated
1980	Edgar Awards	Best Television Feature or Miniseries	Murder by Natural Causes	Won
1983	Edgar Awards	Best Television Feature or Miniseries	Rehearsal for Murder	Won
1985	CableACE Award	Movie or Miniseries	The Guardian	Nominated
1985	Primetime Emmy Awards	Outstanding Drama Series	Murder, She Wrote	Nominated
1986	Edgar Awards	Best Television Feature or Miniseries	Guilty Conscience	Won
1986	Writers Guild of America Awards	Laurel Award for TV Writing Achievement		Won

The following awards were granted only to Link:

Year	Association	Category	Work	Result
1999	Producers Guild of America Awards	PGA Hall of Fame – Television Programs	That Certain Summer	Won

=== Other awards and recognition ===
- 2002: Named president of the Mystery Writers of America (one of the few television writers to achieve this honor).
- 2018: Edgar Allan Poe Grand Master Award

== Eponyms ==
The William Link Theatre on the campus of California State University, Long Beach, is named after Link in honor of his work and donation of plays.

== Published works ==
- Link, William; Levinson, Richard (1983) [1981]. Stay Tuned: An Inside Look at the Making of Prime-Time Television. New York: Ace Books. ISBN 978-0441785469.
- Levinson, Richard; Link, William (1986). Off Camera: Conversations with the Makers of Prime-time Television. New York: New American Library. ISBN 9780452258730.
- William Link (January 19, 2010). The Columbo Collection by William Link. Crippen & Landru Publishers. ASIN B01B98WOZK.
