= Mrs. Columbo =

1979 American television series

- Title card for earliest episodes
- Also known as: Kate Columbo; Kate the Detective; Kate Loves a Mystery; Madame Columbo
- Genre: Crime drama
- Created by: Richard Alan Simmons
- Starring: Kate Mulgrew; Lili Haydn; Henry Jones; Don Stroud
- Music by: John Cacavas; C.R. Cassey (one episode)
- Country of origin: United States
- Original language: English
- No. of seasons: 2
- No. of episodes: 13

Production
- Producers: Fred Silverman; Richard Alan Simmons
- Running time: 60 minutes
- Production companies: Universal Television; Gambit Productions

Original release
- Network: NBC
- Release: February 26, 1979 – March 19, 1980

Related
- Columbo (1968–2003)

Mrs. Columbo (later called Kate Columbo, Kate the Detective, and Kate Loves a Mystery) is an American crime drama television series, initially based on the wife of Lieutenant Columbo, the title character from the television series Columbo. It was created and produced by Richard Alan Simmons and Universal Television for NBC, and stars Kate Mulgrew as a news reporter helping to solve crimes while raising her daughter.

The series debuted in February 1979 as a spin-off to the mystery crime drama series Columbo, focusing on Lieutenant Columbo's wife, who is never given a first name in the original Columbo series but was named Kate in this series. After poor ratings and reception from both audiences and the original producers of Columbo, both the series and the eponymous character herself were renamed in an attempt to change direction, but this did not help ratings and the series ended with a run of just 13 episodes. Neither Peter Falk nor the character of Lieutenant Columbo ever appeared on the show.

== Series overview ==
Kate Columbo (later renamed Kate Callahan) is originally presented as the wife of Lieutenant Columbo, the title character from the television series Columbo. Kate is a news reporter who solves crimes while raising her daughter.

== Cast ==
- Kate Mulgrew as Kate Columbo / Kate Callahan
- Lili Haydn as Jenny Columbo / Jenny Callahan (Kate's daughter)
- Henry Jones as Josh Alden
- Don Stroud as Sergeant Mike Varrick

== Production ==
=== Development ===
Shortly after the Columbo series ended its original run on NBC in 1978, and despite objections from Columbo creator-producers Richard Levinson and William Link, NBC executive Fred Silverman went forward in producing Mrs. Columbo as a spin-off to the original series. Levinson and Link further objected to Silverman's insistence on casting someone young to play the part; Kate Mulgrew was only 24 years old when the show made its debut. (Mulgrew was 12 when Peter Falk first appeared as Columbo and discussed his wife in the pilot film Prescription: Murder.) The information NBC released about the show was unambiguous that Mrs. Columbo in the new series was the previously unseen wife frequently mentioned on Columbo.

=== Retooling ===
The show received poor ratings, and as part of efforts to revamp it, as of the sixth episode broadcast, the linkage between this Kate Columbo and the Mrs. Columbo of the original television series was reduced. The name of the character was changed to Kate Callahan after an off-screen divorce, and the series was renamed Kate the Detective at the beginning of the second season, followed by Kate Loves a Mystery. There was evidently some confusion over what the new title would be, since the first episode of season 2, "Ladies of the Afternoon," was listed in guides as an episode of Kate the Detective while ads called the show Kate Loves a Mystery. The revamped series also introduced the character Sergeant Mike Varrick of the Valley Municipal Police Department, played by Don Stroud.

In this final incarnation, the producers completed their retreat from the show's original premise, and Kate Callahan was then regarded as being a completely different character from Mrs. Columbo of Columbo, Kate's ex-husband now named Philip. Lt. Columbo was previously shown to have the first name Frank in the 1971 Columbo episode "Dead Weight." None of the changes aided the show's ratings, however, and it was cancelled in December 1979. One last new episode, the thirteenth, aired in March 1980.

== Episodes ==
=== Season 1 (1979) ===
| No. overall | No. in season | Title | Directed by | Written by | Original release date |
|---|---|---|---|---|---|
| 1 | 1 | "Word Games" | Boris Sagal | Richard Alan Simmons | February 26, 1979 |
Kate stumbles into a crime-fighting career of her own when she overhears an attorney's plan to murder his wife. Double-length pilot film (90 min.).
| 2 | 2 | "Murder Is a Parlor Game" | Don Medford | Story by : Sheldon Willens; Teleplay by : Sheldon Willens & Al Reynolds & Howard Berk | March 1, 1979 |
Kate suspects a former Scotland Yard inspector of murdering a waiter.
| 3 | 3 | "A Riddle for Puppets" | Edward Abroms | Gregory S. Dinallo | March 15, 1979 |
Kate goes after a psychotic ventriloquist who murdered the craftsman who made his dummy.
| 4 | 4 | "Caviar with Everything" | Don Medford | Al Reynolds & Howard Berk | March 22, 1979 |
Kate suspects the death of a chic Beverly Hills caterer was not as accidental as it appeared.
| 5 | 5 | "A Puzzle for Prophets" | Sam Wanamaker | Al Reynolds | March 29, 1979 |
Kate is skeptical when the business manager of a clairvoyant is scared to death of a TV show.

=== Season 2 (1979–80) ===
| No. overall | No. in season | Title | Directed by | Written by | Original release date |
|---|---|---|---|---|---|
| 6 | 1 | "Ladies of the Afternoon" | Don Medford | Story by : Larry Alexander; Teleplay by : Lawrence Hertzog | October 18, 1979 |
Kate investigates a murder that involves a group of housewives turned daytime prostitutes. Don Stroud debuts as Sgt. Varrick; this episode also features Ted Danson. As of this episode Kate is now named "Kate Callahan", all references to her husband are removed, and the paper she works for is now The Valley Advocate (rather than The Weekly Advertiser). None of these changes are explained or even commented upon within the show.
| 7 | 2 | "It Goes with the Territory" | Leo Penn | Merwin Gerard | October 25, 1979 |
A scoop about political corruption leads to a murderous car bombing. With Peter Donat and Bibi Besch
| 8 | 3 | "Off the Record" | Reza Badiyi | Story by : Chris Bunch & Alan Cole; Teleplay by : Simon Muntner | November 1, 1979 |
Kate is in serious trouble with the law after trying to keep a source secret during a murder investigation. Kate mentions to Varrick she has reverted to her maiden name of Callahan (without mentioning her married name). She had already been using the name for the previous two episodes; this episode appears to be shown out of order.
| 9 | 4 | "The Valley Strangler" | Sigmund Neufeld Jr. | Story by : Will Lorin; Teleplay by : Lawrence Hertzog | November 8, 1979 |
Unconvinced that the police have the right man, Kate befriends a suspected serial killer (Andrew Robinson) after his arrest.
| 10 | 5 | "A Chilling Surprise" | Philip Leacock | E. Arthur Kean | November 22, 1979 |
A business associate of Kate's collapses outside the restaurant he is co-owner of. Kate rushes to get help, returning seconds later only to discover the man — and his car — have disappeared. With Armand Assante.
| 11 | 6 | "Falling Star" | Sam Wanamaker | Story by : Robert McKee & Robert Misiorowski; Teleplay by : Lawrence Hertzog & Merwin Gerard and Robert McKee & Robert Misiorowski | November 29, 1979 |
Kate's new beau, a local political hopeful (David Rasche), finds his campaign in jeopardy when a woman from his past shows up and is subsequently murdered.
| 12 | 7 | "Feelings Can Be Murder" | Seymour Robbie | Mary Anne Kasica & Michael Scheff | December 6, 1979 |
After a woman is murdered, Kate hones in on a therapy group she had attended, led by a dubiously credentialed doctor (René Auberjonois).
| 13 | 8 | "Love, on Instant Replay" | E. Arthur Kean (credited as Alan Smithee) | Joe Gores | March 19, 1980 |
A former Czechoslovak freedom fighter is the chief suspect in the murder of a video dating service worker. Kate remains doubtful of his guilt even after she discovers a recording of the matchmaker threatening the man with deportation.

== Reception ==
Peter Falk expressed his disapproval of the spin-off, calling it a "bad idea" and "disgraceful". Richard Levinson later joked that if they made another episode of Columbo they would have Columbo say "There's a woman running around pretending to be my wife. She's changing things. She's a young girl. I wish my wife was like that. She's an impostor."

== Home media ==
The Mrs. Columbo episode "A Riddle for Puppets" was included as a bonus feature in the Region 1 DVD release of the fourth season of Columbo, released in August 2005. The episode "Murder Is a Parlor Game" was included in the third season of Columbo. The episode "Caviar with Everything" was included in the fifth season of Columbo. Both seasons of Mrs. Columbo were released as a 5-disc set, Madame Columbo — Saisons 1 & 2, in France on October 22, 2014, by Universal and Elephant Films.
