= Columbo (character) =

Fictitious character in eponymous American TV detective crime drama series

- Columbo character
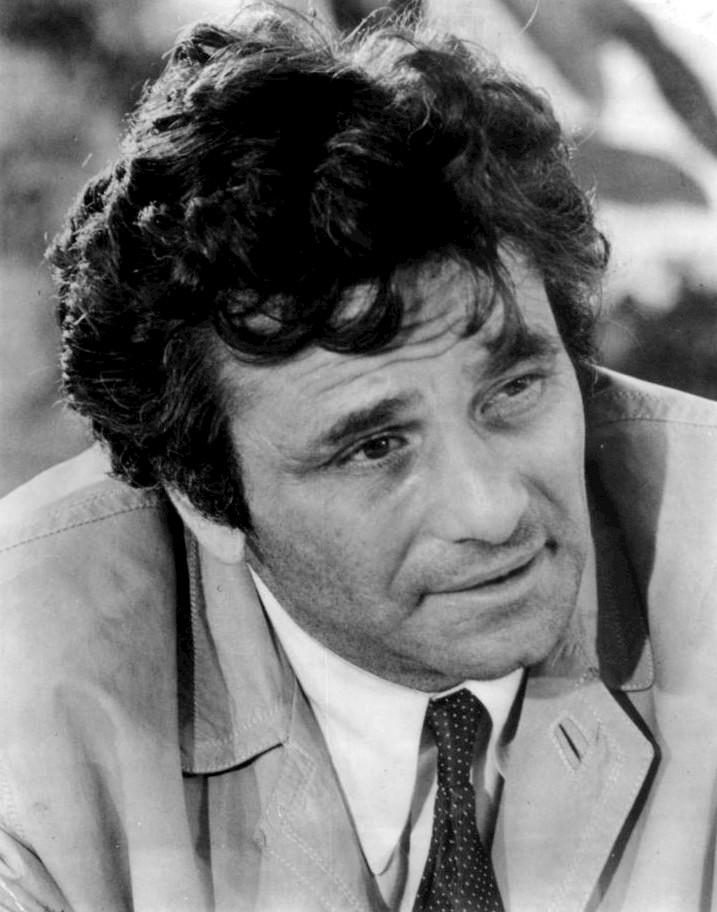
- Peter Falk as Columbo, 1973
- First appearance: "Enough Rope" (1960)
- Last appearance: "Columbo Likes the Nightlife" (2003)
- Created by: Richard Levinson; William Link
- Portrayed by: Bert Freed (1960, TV); Thomas Mitchell (1962, stage); Peter Falk (1968–2003, TV); Norm Boucher (2007, stage); Dirk Benedict (2010, stage); John Guerrasio (2011, stage)

Lieutenant Frank Columbo is the main character in the American detective crime drama television series Columbo, in which is he portrayed by Peter Falk. The character was created by Richard Levinson and William Link. Columbo is a shrewd and exceptionally observant homicide detective who often disguises his aptitude with his inelegant, shambling manner; trademarks of his blue-collar ethos include his rumpled beige raincoat, cigar and relentless investigative approach. Columbo's "everydayness" is what enables him to succeed, as "his attunement to routines and their disruption, to habits of speech and behaviour, and to the things people ordinarily say and do ... makes his distinctive mode of detection possible, allowing him to notice when something doesn't 'fit'."

== Character history ==
The episode of The Chevy Mystery Show in which Columbo first appears, depicted by Bert Freed

Columbo first appeared in a 1960 episode of The Chevy Mystery Show titled "Enough Rope", wherein he was portrayed by Bert Freed. After this, the character was portrayed almost invariably by Peter Falk, who appeared in the role from 1968 through 2003.

Levinson and Link said that the character was based on the Crime and Punishment character Porfiry Petrovich. Roger Ebert speculated that Columbo's character was also influenced by Inspector Fichet from the French suspense-thriller film Les Diaboliques.

Columbo's signature catchphrase, "just one more thing", originated when Levinson and Link were writing a scene in which Columbo interrogated a criminal before leaving his apartment. The scene was too short, however, and they could not add conversation into the middle of the scene as they were using a typewriter, and that would require rewriting the scene from the beginning. They decided to fix this by having Columbo stick his head back through the door and say "just one more thing" as if he had forgotten something.

Columbo's first name is never mentioned in dialogue, although the name "Frank Columbo" can be seen on pieces of identification in a few episodes. Due to Columbo's first name being obscure in the show, author Fred L. Worth intentionally included a fictitious entry in The Trivia Encyclopedia, falsely claiming that the character's first name was "Philip" in order to catch copyright infringement of the book. This incorrect trivium was reused in Trivial Pursuit, causing Worth to sue the game's publishers. The judge ultimately decided against Worth.

== Fictional character biography ==
As an east-coast Italian American working as a police lieutenant for the Los Angeles Police Department, Columbo investigates elaborate murders committed by intelligent criminals who "have some combination of wealth, power, prestige and influence," and are thus often members of high society. With his high intelligence and keen eye for detail, Columbo usually suspects the true killer soon after investigating the scene of the crime. During the rest of the investigation, Columbo relies on his outsider status, unassuming personality, and seemingly clumsy manner to ingratiate himself with the suspect. Often, the suspect eventually confesses after Columbo reveals small but highly incriminating details he has discovered about the crime. Columbo classically drives an old beat-up Peugeot 403 car, which sometimes helps lull suspects into a false sense of security about the detective's competence. He does not carry a gun, and in later episodes is occasionally accompanied by a Basset Hound he calls "Dog".

Information about Columbo's life outside of his police work is scarce and revealed through his rambling anecdotes. Columbo often refers to his wife, who is an unseen character in the show. She later received a spin-off show called Mrs. Columbo, although the canonicity of this show is disputed.

== Reception and legacy ==
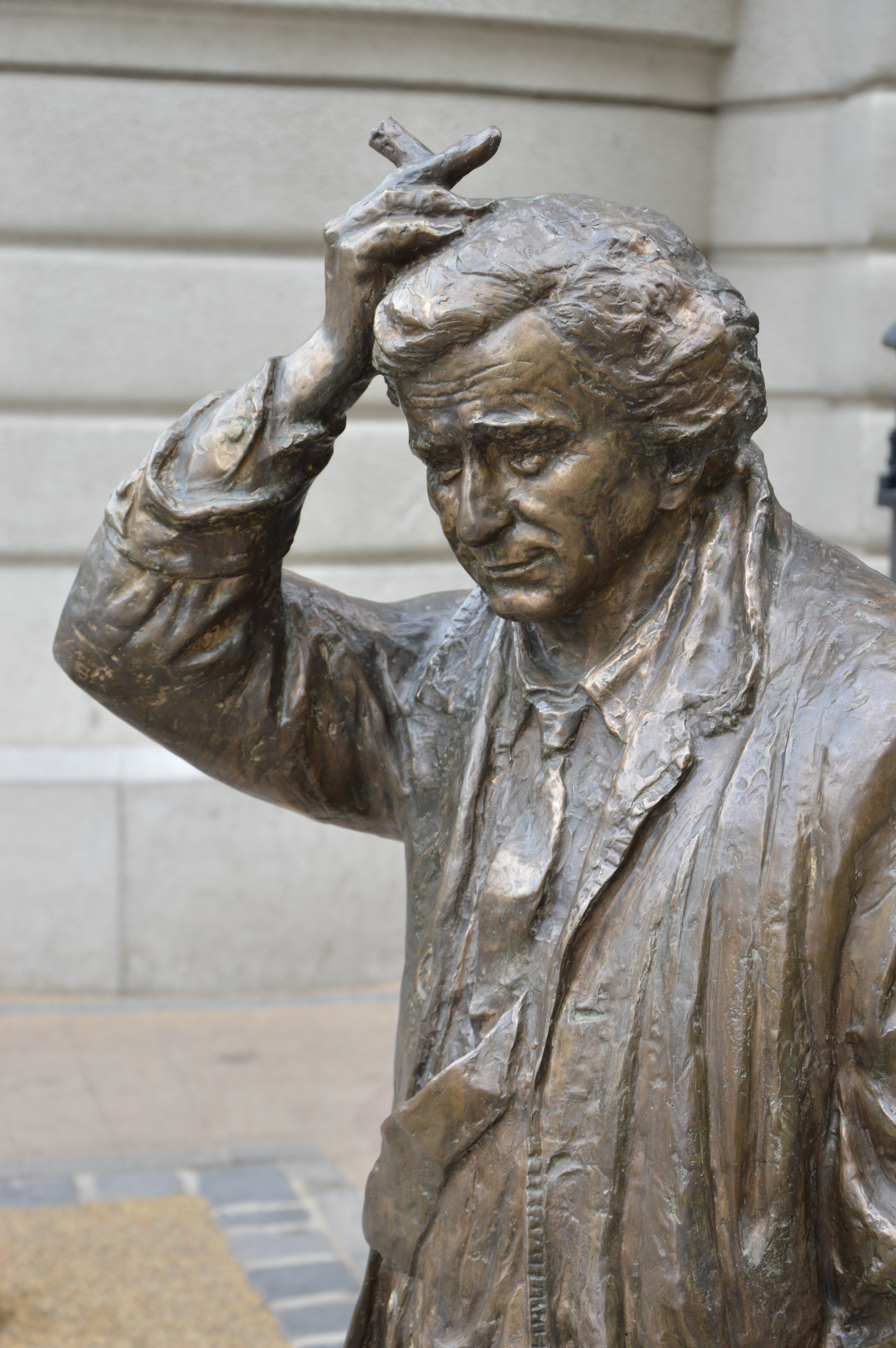
The statue of Columbo in Budapest, Hungary

In a 2001 poll conducted by Channel 4 in the UK, Columbo was ranked 18th on their list of the 100 Greatest TV Characters. He was also listed by Parade as one of the "greatest TV cops of all time", and The Independent described him as "an enduring TV icon".

=== Statue ===
In 2014, a bronze sculptural work with life-sized statues of Columbo and his dog, Dog, by the sculptor Géza Dezső Fekete was erected in Miksa Falk Street, Budapest. An urban legend states that the Hungarian politician and journalist Miksa Falk and Peter Falk were distant relatives, although this is untrue.

== See also ==
- List of fictional police detectives
