= James Langham =

James Langham may refer to:

- Sir James Langham, 2nd Baronet (1621–1699)
- Sir James Langham, 7th Baronet (1736–1795)
- Sir James Langham, 10th Baronet (1776–1833), of the Langham baronets
- James R. Langham, American crime writer
- James Wallace Langham, American actor
