= List of Columbo episodes =

The following is an episode list for the crime fiction television series Columbo. After two pilot episodes, the show originally aired on NBC from 1971 to 1978 as one of the rotating programs of The NBC Mystery Movie. Columbo then aired on ABC as part of The ABC Mystery Movie from 1989 to 1990 and less frequently starting in late 1990. The last installment was broadcast in 2003.

Because the Columbo episodes from late 1990 to 2003 aired infrequently, different DVD sets have been released around the world. In Region 2 and 4, all episodes have now been released as 10 seasons. Seasons 8–9 reflect the two seasons aired as part of The ABC Mystery Movie, and the 10th season covers the last 14 episodes from "Columbo Goes to College" (1990) to the series finale, "Columbo Likes the Nightlife" (2003). In France and the Netherlands (also Region 2), however, the DVDs were released as 12 seasons. In Region 1, all episodes from season 8 are grouped differently: Those that were originally aired on ABC were released in four volumes under the banner COLUMBO: The Mystery Movie Collection. For the sake of clarity, all episodes in this article are arranged as they appear in the UK release.

== Series overview ==
Season	Episodes	Originally released		
Season	Episodes	First released	Last released	Network
Pilots	2	February 20, 1968	March 1, 1971	NBC
1	7	September 15, 1971	February 9, 1972	NBC
2	8	September 17, 1972	March 25, 1973	NBC
3	8	September 23, 1973	May 5, 1974	NBC
4	6	September 15, 1974	April 27, 1975	NBC
5	6	September 14, 1975	May 2, 1976	NBC
6	3	October 10, 1976	May 22, 1977	NBC
7	5	November 21, 1977	May 13, 1978	NBC
8	4	February 6, 1989	May 1, 1989	ABC
9	6	November 25, 1989	May 14, 1990	ABC
10 + Specials	14	December 9, 1990	January 30, 2003	ABC

== Episodes ==
=== Pilot episodes ===
Before Peter Falk was cast in the role of Columbo, Bert Freed played the character in "Enough Rope", a 1960 episode of The Chevy Mystery Show, a TV anthology series. In 1962, that episode became a stage play titled Prescription: Murder, which starred Thomas Mitchell as Columbo, Joseph Cotten and Agnes Moorehead as Roy and Claire Flemming, and Patricia Medina as Flemming's mistress.

The play was adapted to a made-for-TV movie in 1968, with Falk debuting in the role. In this made-for-TV movie, Columbo—rather than making the rumpled presentation that later became the character's trademark—is less shabbily dressed, wearing suits, shorter hair, and heavier stage makeup. He carries a raincoat, which would become a staple. He wears the raincoat in most of the scenes. He also appears somewhat more aggressive when confronting suspects.

Columbo pilot episodes
No. in series	Title	Directed by	Written by	Murderer played by	Victim played by	Original air date	Runtime
1	"Prescription: Murder"	Richard Irving	Richard Levinson & William Link based on their play	Gene Barry as Ray Flemming	Nina Foch as Carol Flemming	February 20, 1968	94 min
Dr. Ray Flemming (Gene Barry), a psychiatrist, murders his wife (Nina Foch) and persuades his mistress Joan Hudson (Katherine Justice), who is an actress and one of his patients, to support his alibi by impersonating her aboard his plane flight. Columbo notices that Flemming does not call out to his wife when he gets back. Final clue and twist: Columbo stages the suicide of Flemming's mistress, then urges him to confess now that the love of his life has killed herself for him. Flemming mocks Columbo's words, saying he never cared deeply for Joan and would have gotten rid of her eventually, anyway. Joan, listening in, agrees to testify against Flemming.
2	"Ransom for a Dead Man"	Richard Irving	Story by : Richard Levinson & William Link; Teleplay by : Dean Hargrove	Lee Grant as Leslie Williams	Harlan Warde as Paul Williams	March 1, 1971	92 min
Leslie Williams (Lee Grant), a brilliant and ruthless lawyer, murders her husband Paul (Harlan Warde) to get his money, arranging the act to look as if he had been kidnapped and killed by his captors. Final clue and twist: Margaret (Patricia Mattick), who hates her stepmother Leslie, tells Leslie she will go away if Leslie gives her a lot of money. When Leslie pays Margaret off with some of the ransom cash, identified by the serial numbers, Columbo, who had persuaded Margaret to demand money from Leslie, has the final proof he needs.

=== Season 1 (1971–72) ===
No. overall	No. in season	Title	Directed by	Written by	Murderer played by	Victim(s) played by	Original release date	Runtime
3	1	"Murder by the Book"	Steven Spielberg	Steven Bochco	Jack Cassidy as Ken Franklin	Martin Milner as Jim Ferris and Barbara Colby as Lilly La Sanka	September 15, 1971	72 min
4	2	"Death Lends a Hand"	Bernard Kowalski	Richard Levinson & William Link	Robert Culp as Investigator Brimmer	Patricia Crowley as Lenore Kennicut	October 6, 1971	72 min
5	3	"Dead Weight"	Jack Smight	John T. Dugan	Eddie Albert as Martin Hollister	John Kerr as Roger Dutton	October 27, 1971	72 min
6	4	"Suitable for Framing"	Hy Averback	Jackson Gillis	Ross Martin as Dale Kingston and Rosanna Huffman as Tracy O'Connor	Robert Shayne as Rudy Matthews and Rosanna Huffman as Tracy O'Connor	November 17, 1971	72 min
7	5	"Lady in Waiting"	Norman Lloyd	Story by : Barney Slater; Teleplay by : Steven Bochco	Susan Clark as Beth Chadwick	Richard Anderson as Bryce Chadwick	December 15, 1971	72 min
8	6	"Short Fuse"	Edward M. Abroms	Story by : Lester Pine & Tina Pine and Jackson Gillis; Teleplay by : Jackson Gillis	Roddy McDowall as Roger Stanford	James Gregory as David Buckner and Lawrence Cook as Quincy	January 19, 1972	72 min
9	7	"Blueprint for Murder"	Peter Falk	Story by : William Kelley; Teleplay by : Steven Bochco	Patrick O'Neal as Elliot Markham	Forrest Tucker as Beau Williamson	February 9, 1972	71 min

=== Season 2 (1972–73) ===
No. overall	No. in season	Title	Directed by	Written by	Murderer played by	Victim(s) played by	Original release date	Runtime
10	1	"Étude in Black"	Nicholas Colasanto	Story by : Richard Levinson & William Link; Teleplay by : Steven Bochco	John Cassavetes as Alex Benedict	Anjanette Comer as Jenifer Welles	September 17, 1972	91 min
11	2	"The Greenhouse Jungle"	Boris Sagal	Jonathan Latimer	Ray Milland as Jarvis Goodland	Bradford Dillman as Tony Goodland	October 15, 1972	70 min
12	3	"The Most Crucial Game"	Jeremy Kagan	John T. Dugan	Robert Culp as Paul Hanlon	Dean Stockwell as Eric Wagner	November 5, 1972	70 min
13	4	"Dagger of the Mind"	Richard Quine	Story by : Richard Levinson & William Link; Teleplay by : Jackson Gillis	Richard Basehart as Nicholas Frame and Honor Blackman as Lillian Stanhope	John Williams as Sir Roger Haversham and Wilfrid Hyde-White as Tanner	November 26, 1972	92 min
14	5	"Requiem for a Falling Star"	Richard Quine	Jackson Gillis	Anne Baxter as Nora Chandler	Pippa Scott as Jean Davis and John Colicos as Al Cumberland (photograph)	January 21, 1973	70 min
15	6	"A Stitch in Crime"	Hy Averback	Shirl Hendryx	Leonard Nimoy as Barry Mayfield	Anne Francis as Sharon Martin and Jared Martin as Harry Alexander	February 11, 1973	70 min
16	7	"The Most Dangerous Match"	Edward M. Abroms	Story by : Richard Levinson & William Link and Jackson Gillis; Teleplay by : Jackson Gillis	Laurence Harvey as Emmett Clayton	Jack Kruschen as Tomlin Dudek	March 4, 1973	70 min
17	8	"Double Shock"	Robert Butler	Story by : Jackson Gillis and Richard Levinson & William Link; Teleplay by : Steven Bochco	Martin Landau in a dual role as Dexter Paris and Norman Paris	Paul Stewart as Clifford Paris and Julie Newmar as Lisa Chambers	March 25, 1973	70 min

=== Season 3 (1973–74) ===
No. overall	No. in season	Title	Directed by	Written by	Murderer played by	Victim(s) played by	Original release date	Runtime
18	1	"Lovely but Lethal"	Jeannot Szwarc	Story by : Myrna Bercovici; Teleplay by : Jackson Gillis	Vera Miles as Viveca Scott	Martin Sheen as Karl Lessing and Sian Barbara Allen as Shirley Blaine	September 23, 1973	70 min
19	2	"Any Old Port in a Storm"	Leo Penn	Story by : Larry Cohen; Teleplay by : Stanley Ralph Ross	Donald Pleasence as Adrian Carsini	Gary Conway as Rick Carsini	October 7, 1973	91 min
20	3	"Candidate for Crime"	Boris Sagal	Story by : Larry Cohen; Teleplay by : Irving Pearlberg and Alvin R. Friedman and Roland Kibbee & Dean Hargrove	Jackie Cooper as Nelson Hayward	Ken Swofford as Harry Stone	November 4, 1973	94 min
21	4	"Double Exposure"	Richard Quine	Stephen J. Cannell	Robert Culp as Bart Keppel	Robert Middleton as Vic Norris and Chuck McCann as Roger White	December 16, 1973	70 min
22	5	"Publish or Perish"	Robert Butler	Peter S. Fischer	Jack Cassidy as Riley Greenleaf and John Chandler as Eddie Kane	Mickey Spillane as Alan Mallory and John Chandler as Eddie Kane	January 13, 1974	71 min
23	6	"Mind Over Mayhem"	Alf Kjellin	Story by : Robert Specht; Teleplay by : Steven Bochco and Dean Hargrove & Roland Kibbee	José Ferrer as Marshall Cahill	Lew Ayres as Howard Nicholson	February 10, 1974	70 min
24	7	"Swan Song"	Nicholas Colasanto	Story by : Stanley Ralph Ross; Teleplay by : David Rayfiel	Johnny Cash as Tommy Brown	Ida Lupino as Edna Brown and Bonnie Van Dyke as Maryann Cobb	March 3, 1974	94 min
25	8	"A Friend in Deed"	Ben Gazzara	Peter S. Fischer	Richard Kiley as Mark Halperin and Michael McGuire as Hugh Caldwell	Rosemary Murphy as Margaret Halperin and an uncredited actress as Janice Caldwell	May 5, 1974	94 min

=== Season 4 (1974–75) ===
No. overall	No. in season	Title	Directed by	Written by	Murderer played by	Victim(s) played by	Original release date	Runtime
26	1	"An Exercise in Fatality"	Bernard Kowalski	Story by : Larry Cohen; Teleplay by : Peter S. Fischer	Robert Conrad as Milo Janus	Philip Bruns as Gene Stafford	September 15, 1974	94 min
27	2	"Negative Reaction"	Alf Kjellin	Peter S. Fischer	Dick Van Dyke as Paul Galesko	Antoinette Bower as Frances Galesko and Don Gordon as Alvin Deschler	October 6, 1974	91 min
28	3	"By Dawn's Early Light"	Harvey Hart	Howard Berk	Patrick McGoohan as Lyle Rumford	Tom Simcox as William Haynes	October 27, 1974	94 min
29	4	"Troubled Waters"	Ben Gazzara	Story by : Jackson Gillis and William Driskill; Teleplay by : William Driskill	Robert Vaughn as Hayden Danzinger	Poupée Bocar as Rosanna Wells	February 9, 1975	93 min
30	5	"Playback"	Bernard L. Kowalski	Booker Bradshaw & David P. Lewis	Oskar Werner as Harold van Wick	Martha Scott as Margaret Midas	March 2, 1975	70 min
31	6	"A Deadly State of Mind"	Harvey Hart	Peter S. Fischer	George Hamilton as Mark Collier	Stephen Elliott as Carl Donner and Lesley Ann Warren as Nadia Donner	April 27, 1975	70 min

=== Season 5 (1975–76) ===
No. overall	No. in season	Title	Directed by	Written by	Murderer played by	Victim(s) played by	Original release date	Runtime
32	1	"Forgotten Lady"	Harvey Hart	William Driskill	Janet Leigh as Grace Wheeler	Sam Jaffe as Henry Willis	September 14, 1975	93 min
33	2	"A Case of Immunity"	Ted Post	Story by : James Menzies; Teleplay by : Lou Shaw	Héctor Elizondo as Hassan Salah and Sal Mineo as Rachman Habib	André Lawrence as Youseff Alafa and Sal Mineo as Rachman Habib	October 12, 1975	70 min
34	3	"Identity Crisis"	Patrick McGoohan	William Driskill	Patrick McGoohan as Nelson Brenner	Leslie Nielsen as A.J. "Geronimo" Henderson	November 2, 1975	93 min
35	4	"A Matter of Honor"	Ted Post	Brad Radnitz	Ricardo Montalbán as Luis Montoya	Robert Carricart as Hector Rangel	February 1, 1976	70 min
36	5	"Now You See Him..."	Harvey Hart	Michael Sloan	Jack Cassidy as Stefan Mueller	Nehemiah Persoff as Jesse Jerome	February 29, 1976	85 min
37	6	"Last Salute to the Commodore"	Patrick McGoohan	Jackson Gillis	Fred Draper as Swanny Swanson	John Dehner as Otis Swanson and Robert Vaughn as Charles Clay	May 2, 1976	91 min

=== Season 6 (1976–77) ===
No. overall	No. in season	Title	Directed by	Written by	Murderer played by	Victim(s) played by	Original release date	Runtime
38	1	"Fade in to Murder"	Bernard L. Kowalski	Story by : Henry Garson; Teleplay by : Peter Feibleman and Lou Shaw	William Shatner as Ward Fowler	Lola Albright as Claire Daley	October 10, 1976	70 min
39	2	"Old Fashioned Murder"	Robert Douglas	Story by : Lawrence Vail; Teleplay by : Peter Feibleman	Joyce Van Patten as Ruth Lytton	Peter Feibleman as Milton Schaeffer and Tim O'Connor as Edward Lytton	November 28, 1976	72 min
40	3	"The Bye-Bye Sky High I.Q. Murder Case"	Sam Wanamaker	Robert Malcolm Young	Theodore Bikel as Oliver Brandt	Sorrell Booke as Bertie Hastings	May 22, 1977	70 min

=== Season 7 (1977–78) ===
No. overall	No. in season	Title	Directed by	Written by	Murderer played by	Victim(s) played by	Original release date	Runtime
41	1	"Try and Catch Me"	James Frawley	Story by : Gene Thompson; Teleplay by : Gene Thompson and Paul Tuckahoe	Ruth Gordon as Abigail Mitchell	Charles Frank as Edmund Galvin	November 21, 1977	70 min
42	2	"Murder Under Glass"	Jonathan Demme	Robert Van Scoyk	Louis Jourdan as Paul Gerard	Michael V. Gazzo as Vittorio Rossi	January 30, 1978	73 min
43	3	"Make Me a Perfect Murder"	James Frawley	Robert Blees	Trish Van Devere as Kay Freestone	Laurence Luckinbill as Mark McAndrews	February 25, 1978	97 min
44	4	"How to Dial a Murder"	James Frawley	Story by : Anthony Lawrence; Teleplay by : Tom Lazarus	Nicol Williamson as Eric Mason	Joel Fabiani as Charlie Hunter	April 15, 1978	73 min
45	5	"The Conspirators"	Leo Penn	Suggested by the story by : Pat Robison; Teleplay by : Howard Berk	Clive Revill as Joe Devlin	Albert Paulsen as Vincent Pauley	May 13, 1978	93 min

=== Season 8 (1989) ===
No. overall	No. in season	Title	Directed by	Written by	Murderer played by	Victim(s) played by	Original release date	Runtime
46	1	"Columbo Goes to the Guillotine"	Leo Penn	William Read Woodfield	Anthony Andrews as Elliott Blake	Anthony Zerbe as Max Dyson	February 6, 1989	88 min
47	2	"Murder, Smoke and Shadows"	James Frawley	Richard Alan Simmons	Fisher Stevens as Alex Brady	Jeff Perry as Leonard Fisher	February 27, 1989	90 min
48	3	"Sex and the Married Detective"	James Frawley	Jerry Ludwig	Lindsay Crouse as Joan Allenby	Stephen Macht as David Kincaid	April 3, 1989	90 min
49	4	"Grand Deceptions"	Sam Wanamaker	Sy Salkowitz	Robert Foxworth as Frank Brailie	Andy Romano as Lester Keegan	May 1, 1989	90 min

=== Season 9 (1989–90) ===
No. overall	No. in season	Title	Directed by	Written by	Murderer played by	Victim(s) played by	Original release date	Runtime
50	1	"Murder: A Self Portrait"	James Frawley	Robert Sherman	Patrick Bauchau as Max Barsini	Fionnula Flanagan as Louise Barsini; Harold Harris as Harry Chudnow	November 25, 1989	88 min
51	2	"Columbo Cries Wolf"	Daryl Duke	William Read Woodfield	Ian Buchanan as Sean Brantley	Deidre Hall as Dian Hunter	January 20, 1990	92 min
52	3	"Agenda for Murder"	Patrick McGoohan	Jeffrey Bloom	Patrick McGoohan as Oscar Finch	Louis Zorich as Frank Staplin	February 10, 1990	92 min
53	4	"Rest in Peace, Mrs. Columbo"	Vincent McEveety	Peter S. Fischer	Helen Shaver as Vivian Dimitri	Edward Winter as Charlie Chambers	March 31, 1990	93 min
54	5	"Uneasy Lies the Crown"	Alan J. Levi	Steven Bochco	James Read as Wesley Corman	Marshall R. Teague as Adam Evans	April 28, 1990	92 min
55	6	"Murder in Malibu"	Walter Grauman	Jackson Gillis	Andrew Stevens as Wayne Jennings	Janet Margolin as Theresa Goren	May 14, 1990	90 min

=== Season 10 and specials (1990–2003) ===
No. overall	No. in season	Title	Directed by	Written by	Murderer played by	Victim(s) played by	Original release date	Runtime
56	1	"Columbo Goes to College"	E.W. Swackhamer	Story by : Jeffrey Bloom and Frederick King Keller; Teleplay by : Jeffrey Bloom	Stephen Caffrey as Justin Rowe and Gary Hershberger as Cooper Redman	James Sutorius as D.E. Rusk	December 9, 1990	89 min
57	2	"Caution: Murder Can Be Hazardous to Your Health"	Daryl Duke	Sonia Wolf & Patricia Ford & April Raynell	George Hamilton as Wade Anders	Peter Haskell as Budd Clarke	February 20, 1991	86 min
58	3	"Columbo and the Murder of a Rock Star"	Alan J. Levi	William Read Woodfield	Dabney Coleman as Hugh Creighton	Cheryl Paris as Marcy Edwards	April 29, 1991	91 min
59	4	"Death Hits the Jackpot"	Vincent McEveety	Jeffrey Bloom	Rip Torn as Leon Lamarr and Jamie Rose as Nancy Brower	Gary Kroeger as Freddy Brower	December 15, 1991	92 min
60	5	"No Time to Die"	Alan J. Levi	Story by : Ed McBain; Teleplay by : Robert Van Scoyk	(No murderer. Daniel McDonald plays the kidnapper Rudy Strassa.)	(No murder. Joanna Going plays the kidnapping victim, and intended murder victim, Melissa Hayes.)	February 15, 1992	87 min
61	6	"A Bird in the Hand..."	Vincent McEveety	Jackson Gillis	Tyne Daly as Dolores McCain and Greg Evigan as Harold McCain	Steve Forrest as Fred McCain, León Singer as Fernando and Greg Evigan as Harold McCain	November 22, 1992	89 min
62	7	"It's All in the Game"	Vincent McEveety	Peter Falk	Faye Dunaway as Lauren Staton and Claudia Christian as Lisa Martin	Armando Pucci as Nick Franco	October 31, 1993	91 min
63	8	"Butterfly in Shades of Grey"	Dennis Dugan	Peter S. Fischer	William Shatner as Fielding Chase	Jack Laufer as Gerry Winters	January 10, 1994	88 min
64	9	"Undercover"	Vincent McEveety	Story by : Ed McBain; Teleplay by : Gerry Day	Ed Begley Jr. as Irving Krutch (Jon Beshara and an uncredited actor also portray two characters who kill each other)	Burt Young as Mo Weinberg and Shera Danese as Geraldine Ferguson	May 2, 1994	89 min
65	10	"Strange Bedfellows"	Vincent McEveety	Lawrence Vail	George Wendt as Graham McVeigh	Jeff Yagher as Teddy McVeigh and Jay Acovone as Bruno Romano	May 8, 1995	89 min
66	11	"A Trace of Murder"	Vincent McEveety	Charles Kipps	David Rasche as Patrick Kinsley and Shera Danese as Cathleen Calvert	Raye Birk as Howard Seltzer	May 15, 1997	88 min
67	12	"Ashes to Ashes"	Patrick McGoohan	Jeffrey Hatcher	Patrick McGoohan as Eric Prince	Rue McClanahan as Verity Chandler	October 8, 1998	86 min
68	13	"Murder with Too Many Notes"	Patrick McGoohan	Story by : Jeffrey Cava; Teleplay by : Jeffrey Cava and Patrick McGoohan	Billy Connolly as Findlay Crawford	Chad Willett as Gabriel McEnery	March 12, 2001	85 min
69	14	"Columbo Likes the Nightlife"	Jeffrey Reiner	Michael Alaimo	Matthew Rhys as Justin Price and Jennifer Sky as Vanessa Farrow	Carmine Giovinazzo as Tony Galper and Douglas Roberts as Linwood Coben	January 30, 2003	84 min

== Repeat performers ==
Here is a list of the actors who starred as more than one murderer:

- Patrick McGoohan guest starred in four episodes as the murderer: "By Dawn's Early Light" (Emmy Award) (1974), "Identity Crisis" (also directed) (1975), "Agenda for Murder" (Emmy Award) (also directed) (1990), and "Ashes to Ashes" (also directed) (1998). He also directed two additional episodes: "Last Salute to the Commodore" (1976) and "Murder With Too Many Notes" (2001; which he also wrote).
- Jack Cassidy guest starred in three episodes as the murderer: "Murder by the Book" (1971), "Publish or Perish" (1974), and "Now You See Him..." (1976).
- Robert Culp guest starred in three episodes as the murderer: "Death Lends a Hand" (1971, filmed at the Marion Davies estate), "The Most Crucial Game" (1972), and "Double Exposure" (1973). He also appeared in one episode as the father of the murderer: "Columbo Goes to College" (1990).
- George Hamilton guest starred in two episodes as the murderer: "A Deadly State of Mind" (1975) and "Caution: Murder Can Be Hazardous to Your Health" (1991).
- William Shatner guest starred in two episodes as the murderer: "Fade in to Murder" (1976) and "Butterfly in Shades of Grey" (1994). He also did a voiceover in "Double Exposure" (1973).
- Martin Landau guest starred in one episode in a double role as identical twin brothers who committed murder together: "Double Shock" (1973).

Some actors starred as the murderer in one episode and played supporting roles in other episodes:

- Though not a repeat murderer, Robert Vaughn guest starred in two episodes: once as the murderer in "Troubled Waters" (1975), and once as the victim in "Last Salute to the Commodore" (1976).
- Ray Milland appeared as a murderer in "The Greenhouse Jungle" (1972) and the husband of the victim in "Death Lends a Hand" (1971).
- Fred Draper appeared as the murderer in "Last Salute to the Commodore" (1976) and appeared in supporting roles in "Lady in Waiting" (1971), "Lovely but Lethal" (1973), "Negative Reaction" (1974), "A Deadly State of Mind" (1975), and "Fade in to Murder" (1976).
- Patrick O'Neal played the murderer in "Blueprint for Murder" (1972), and appeared in "Make Me a Perfect Murder" (1978).
- Joyce Van Patten starred in "Old Fashioned Murder" (1976) as the murderer, and played a minor supporting role in "Negative Reaction" (1974).
- Dabney Coleman appeared as the murderer in "Columbo and the Murder of a Rock Star" (1991), and also appeared as a cop in "Double Shock" (1973).
- Ed Begley, Jr., played the murderer in "Undercover" (1994) and played Officer Stein in "How to Dial a Murder" (1978).
- Tyne Daly starred in "A Bird in the Hand" as co-murderer Dolores McCain (1992), and "Undercover" as the supporting character Dorothea McNally (1994).
- Shera Danese plays a disgruntled wife who assists in a murder in "A Trace of Murder" (1997), in addition to appearing in five other episodes as a supporting character.

== See also ==
- List of The NBC Mystery Movie episodes
