= The Red-Light Sting =

- Genre: Crime; Thriller
- Based on: "The Whorehouse Sting" by Henry Post
- Written by: Howard Berk
- Directed by: Rod Holcomb
- Starring: Farrah Fawcett; Beau Bridges; Harold Gould
- Music by: James Di Pasquale
- Country of origin: United States
- Original language: English

Production
- Executive producer: Jon Epstein
- Cinematography: Woody Omens
- Editor: Scott C. Eyler
- Running time: 100 minutes
- Production company: Universal Television

Original release
- Network: CBS
- Release: April 5, 1984

The Red-Light Sting is a 1984 American crime thriller television film directed by Rod Holcomb and written by Howard Berk, based on true events detailed in the February 2, 1981 New York magazine article "The Whorehouse Sting" by Henry Post. It stars Farrah Fawcett, Beau Bridges, and Harold Gould. It aired on CBS on April 5, 1984.

== Plot ==
In order to arrest an elusive San Francisco crime boss, agents of the Justice Department come up with a plan to buy a brothel, install hidden cameras, and catch him in a sting operation when he inevitably extorts it for protection money. The rookie agent put in charge of the operation is aided by a veteran call girl at the brothel.

== Cast ==
- Farrah Fawcett as Kathy Dunn
- Beau Bridges as Frank Powell
- Harold Gould as Oliver Sully
- Paul Burke as Brockelhurst
- Alex Henteloff as Jesse Lorner
- Conrad Janis as Bowman
- Sunny Johnson as Sonia
- James Luisi as Renny Lucas
- Philip Charles MacKenize as Ruger
- Murray MacLeod as Ruger's assistant
- Macon McCalman as Jeffers
- Lawrence Pressman as Larry Barton
