= Columbo =

American crime drama television film series

- Genre: Crime drama Detective fiction Neo-noir
- Created by: Richard Levinson; William Link
- Starring: Peter Falk
- Theme music composer: Henry Mancini (NBC Mystery Movie theme, Seasons 1–7); Mike Post (ABC Mystery Movie theme, Seasons 8–9)
- Country of origin: United States
- Original language: English
- No. of seasons: 10
- No. of episodes: 69 (list of episodes)

Production
- Executive producers: Dean Hargrove (1973–1975); Roland Kibbee (1973–1975); Richard Levinson (1971); William Link (1971); Philip Saltzman (1989)
- Camera setup: Single-camera
- Running time: 70–97 minutes
- Production companies: Universal Television (1968–1978, 1989–1997); Studios USA (1998–2001); Universal Network Television (2003)

Original release
- Network: NBC
- Release: February 20, 1968 – May 13, 1978
- Network: ABC
- Release: February 6, 1989 – January 30, 2003

Related
- Mrs. Columbo (1979–1980); The NBC Mystery Movie

Columbo is an American crime drama television series starring Peter Falk as Lieutenant Columbo, a homicide detective with the Los Angeles Police Department. After two pilot episodes in 1968 and 1971, the show originally aired on NBC from 1971 to 1978 as one of the rotating programs of The NBC Mystery Movie. Columbo then aired on ABC as a rotating program on The ABC Mystery Movie from 1989 to 1990, and on a less frequent basis from 1990 to 2003. During its run, the series received 68 award nominations and won 22; Falk won four Primetime Emmy Awards (1972, 1975, 1976, 1990) and a Golden Globe Award (1973).

Columbo is a shrewd and exceptionally observant homicide detective whose trademarks include a rumpled beige raincoat, an unassuming demeanor, a cigar, a battered Peugeot 403, love of chili, and a frequently mentioned but unseen wife. He often leaves a room only to return with the catchphrase "Just one more thing" to ask a critical question.

The character and show, created by Richard Levinson and William Link, popularized the inverted detective story format (sometimes referred to as a "howcatchem"). This genre begins by showing the commission of the crime and its perpetrator; the plot, therefore, usually has no "whodunit" element of determining which of several suspects committed the crime. It instead revolves around how a perpetrator known to the audience will finally be caught and exposed. The clues Columbo finds to help him solve the case are sometimes revealed to the audience beforehand, but often not until the episode's end.

According to Alex Clayton and Sarah Moore, the "essential features of the Columbo villain" are "highness and mightiness. He needs to have some combination of wealth, power, prestige and influence." The casting of well known performers, such as Donald Pleasence and Dick Van Dyke, as villains ensures this connection. As the series' homicide suspects are often affluent members of high society, this has led some critics to see class conflict as an element of each story. Suspects carefully cover their tracks and are initially dismissive of Columbo's circumstantial speech and apparent ineptitude. They become increasingly unsettled as his superficially pestering behavior teases out incriminating evidence. His relentless approach often leads to self-incrimination or outright confession.

Episodes of Columbo are between 70 and 98 minutes long, and they have been broadcast in 44 countries. The show has been described by the BBC as "timeless" and remains popular today.

== Episodes ==
Season	Episodes	Originally released		
Season	Episodes	First released	Last released	Network
Pilots	2	February 20, 1968	March 1, 1971	NBC
1	7	September 15, 1971	February 9, 1972	NBC
2	8	September 17, 1972	March 25, 1973	NBC
3	8	September 23, 1973	May 5, 1974	NBC
4	6	September 15, 1974	April 27, 1975	NBC
5	6	September 14, 1975	May 2, 1976	NBC
6	3	October 10, 1976	May 22, 1977	NBC
7	5	November 21, 1977	May 13, 1978	NBC
8	4	February 6, 1989	May 1, 1989	ABC
9	6	November 25, 1989	May 14, 1990	ABC
10 + Specials	14	December 9, 1990	January 30, 2003	ABC

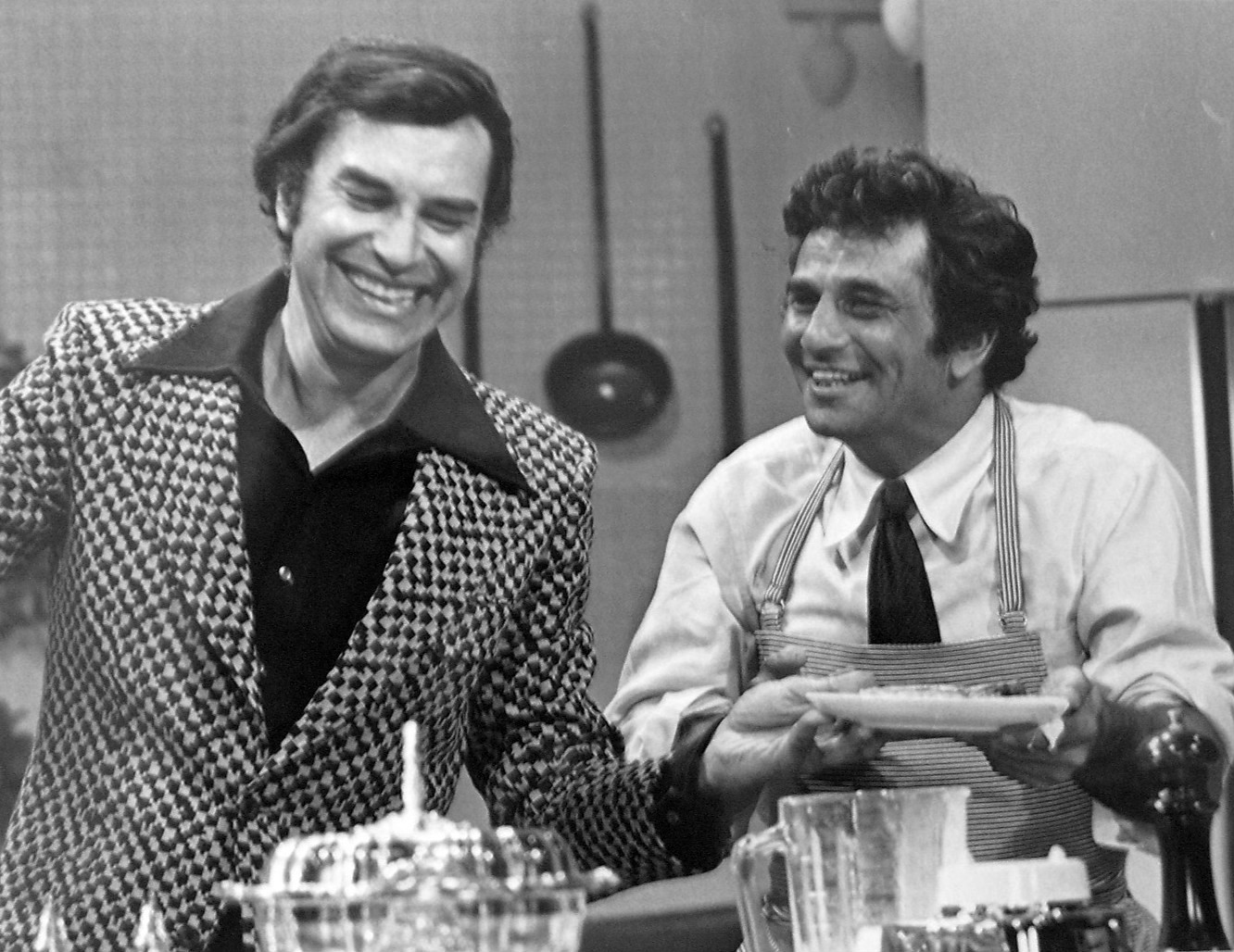
Martin Landau and Falk in the 1973 episode "Double Shock," in which Landau played a dual role as twins

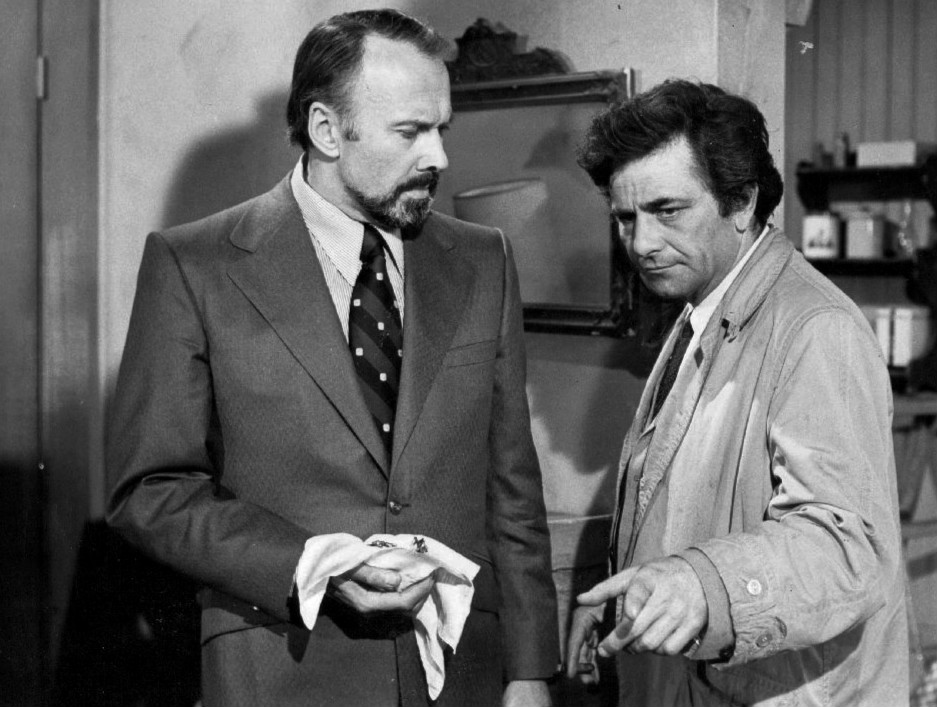
Richard Kiley and Falk in Season 3 Episode 8, "A Friend in Deed", 1974

After two pilot episodes, the show originally aired on NBC from 1971 to 1978 as one of the rotating programs of The NBC Mystery Movie. Columbo then aired on ABC under the umbrella of The ABC Mystery Movie from 1989 to 1990. After The ABC Mystery Movie was canceled, Columbo episodes continued to premiere on ABC on a less frequent basis; the last episode was broadcast in 2003 as part of ABC Thursday Night at the Movies.

In almost every episode, the audience sees the crime unfold at the beginning and knows the identity of the culprit, typically an affluent member of society. Once Columbo enters the story (he rarely appears in the first act), viewers watch him solve the case by sifting through the contradictions between the truth and the version presented to him by the killer(s). This style of mystery is sometimes referred to as a "howcatchem", in contrast to the traditional whodunit. In structural analysis terms, the majority of the narrative is therefore dénouement, a feature normally reserved for the very end of a story. Episodes tend to be driven by their characters, the audience observing the criminal's reactions to Columbo's increasingly intrusive presence.

When Columbo first appears in an episode, his genius is hidden from the viewer by his frumpy, friendly, and disarming demeanor. While the details, and eventually the motivations, of the murderers' actions are always shown to the viewer, Columbo's true thoughts and intentions are sometimes concealed until the end of the episode. He occasionally begins to whistle the tune "This Old Man" as the pieces begin to fall into place.

Columbo generally maintains a friendly relationship with the murderer until the end, and sometimes even after their confession or incrimination, despite both characters being aware of their adversarial positions. The detective usually suspects the murderer within moments of their meeting, or even earlier, often based on their reaction to the news of the victim's death. The murderer, in turn, almost always soon sees through Columbo's scruffy and absent-minded manner to his underlying investigative intellect, and accordingly takes steps to divert his efforts by disguising evidence, manipulating witnesses, manufacturing evidence to lead Columbo towards a different suspect, and/or feigning irritation as an excuse for declining requests for searches and interrogations. In some cases, the murderer will even taunt Columbo over his inability to prove their guilt. There are two sides to Columbo's character: the disarming and unkempt detective and the hidden genius sleuth. The genius sometimes starkly manifests itself through his eyes, as when the magician The Great Santini escapes from police handcuffs that Columbo coyly presents him during Santini's show ("Now You See Him..."). In some instances, such as the avenging elderly mystery writer in "Try and Catch Me" and the terminally ill and deluded actress in "Forgotten Lady", many viewers find the killer more sympathetic than the victim.

Each episode is generally concluded with Columbo proving the killer's guilt, though some episodes, such as "Swan Song", go on to show the killer confessing or quietly submitting to arrest. There are a few attempts to deceive the viewer or provide a twist in the tale. One exception is "Last Salute to the Commodore", where Robert Vaughn is seen elaborately disposing of a body, but later proved to have been covering for his alcoholic wife, whom he mistakenly thought to be the murderer. Sometimes, Columbo sets up the murderer with a trick designed to elicit a confession. An example occurs in "Dagger of the Mind", in which Columbo flips an evidentiary pearl into the victim's umbrella, bringing about incriminating activity from Nicholas Frame and Lillian Stanhope.

== Development and character profile ==
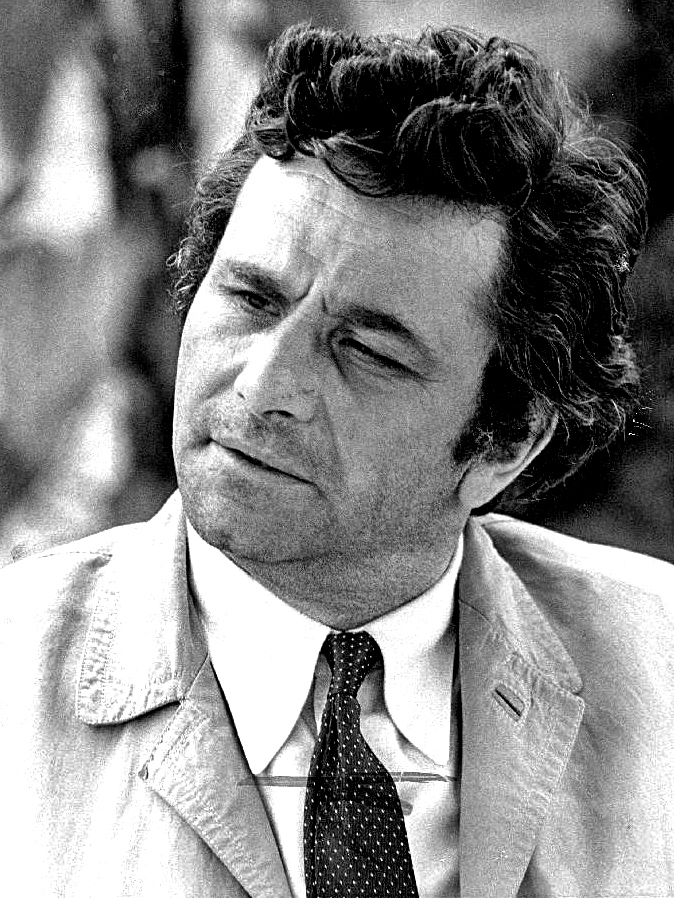
Peter Falk as Lt. Columbo, 1973

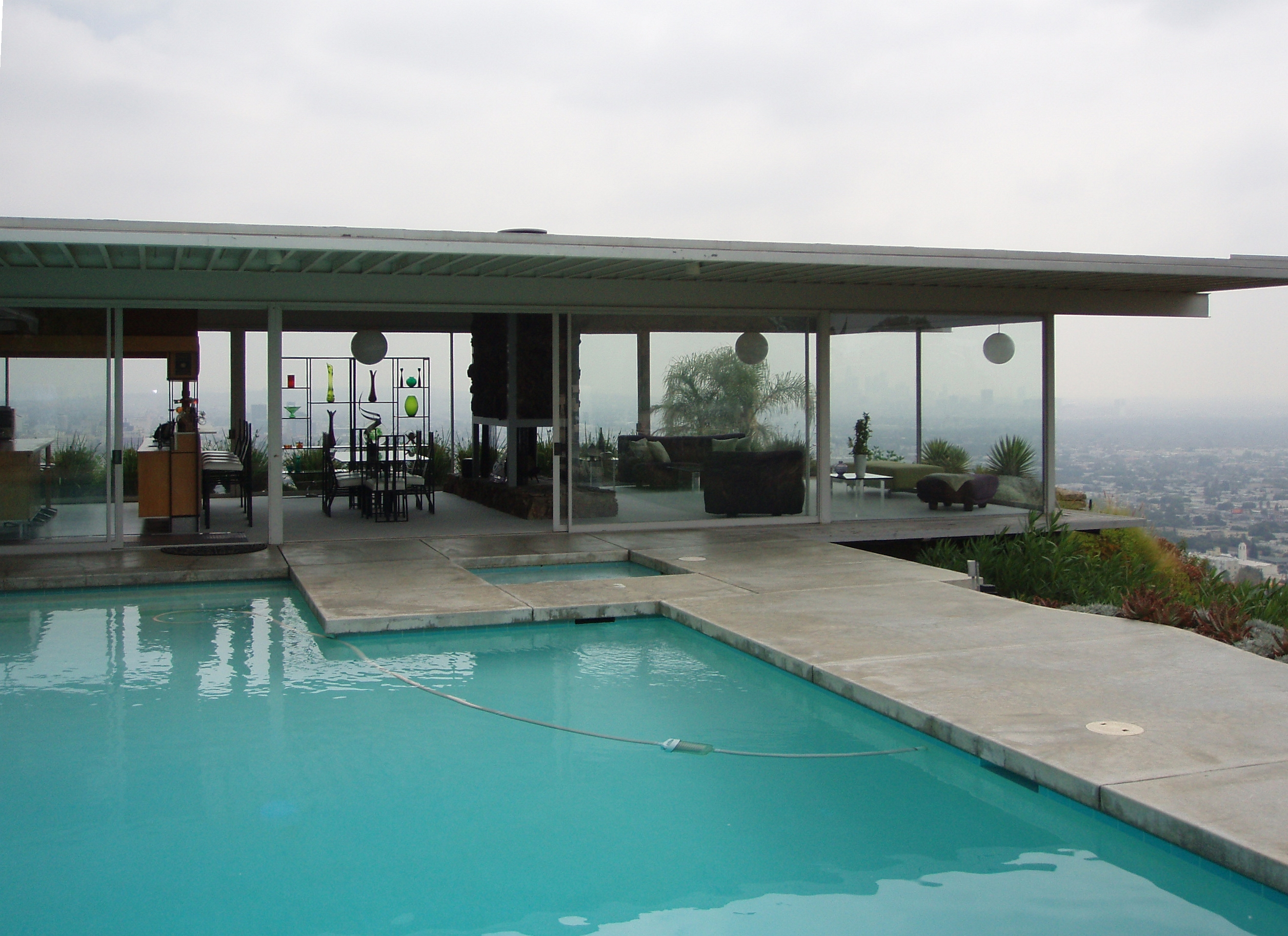
The first Columbo pilot, "Prescription: Murder", guest starring Gene Barry, Nina Foch, and William Windom, was filmed at the Stahl House.

The character of Columbo was created by the writing team of Richard Levinson and William Link, who said that Columbo was partially inspired by Fyodor Dostoevsky's Crime and Punishment character Porfiry Petrovich, as well as G. K. Chesterton's humble cleric-detective Father Brown. Other sources claim Columbo's character is also influenced by Inspector Fichet from the French suspense-thriller film Les Diaboliques (1955).

The character first appeared in a 1960 episode of the television anthology series The Chevy Mystery Show, titled "Enough Rope". This was adapted by Levinson and Link from their short story "May I Come In?", which had been published as "Dear Corpus Delicti" in the March 1960 issue of Alfred Hitchcock's Mystery Magazine. The short story featured a police lieutenant then named Fisher, though Fisher did not solve the case. The first actor to portray Columbo, character actor Bert Freed, was a stocky character actor with a thatch of gray hair.

Freed's Columbo wore a rumpled suit and smoked a cigar; he otherwise had few of the other now-familiar Columbo mannerisms. The character is still recognizably Columbo and uses some of the same methods of misdirecting and distracting his suspects. During the course of the show, the increasingly frightened murderer brings pressure from the district attorney's office to have Columbo taken off the case, but the detective fights back with his own contacts.

Although Freed received third billing, he wound up with almost as much screen time as the killer and appeared immediately after the first commercial. This delayed entry of the character into the narrative of the screenplay became a defining characteristic of the structure of the Columbo series. This teleplay is available for viewing in the archives of the Paley Center for Media in New York City and the Beverly Hills Public Library in Los Angeles.

Levinson and Link then adapted the TV drama into the stage play Prescription: Murder. This was first performed at the Curran Theatre in San Francisco on January 2, 1962, with Oscar-winning character actor Thomas Mitchell in the role of Columbo. Mitchell was 70 years old at the time. The stage production starred Joseph Cotten as the murderer and Agnes Moorehead as the victim. Mitchell died of cancer while the play was touring in out-of-town tryouts; Columbo was his last role.

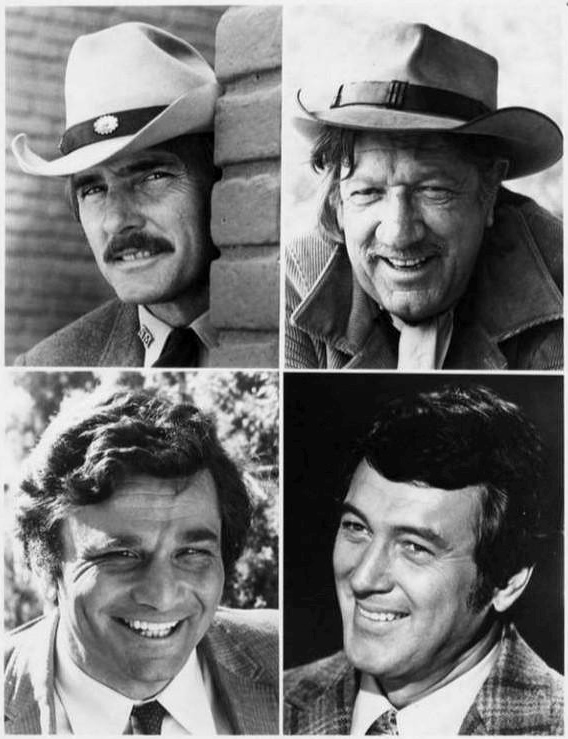
The NBC Mystery Movie program worked on a rotating basis – one per month from each of its shows. Top left: Dennis Weaver in McCloud. Top right: Richard Boone in Hec Ramsey. Bottom left: Peter Falk in Columbo. Bottom right: Rock Hudson in McMillan & Wife

In 1968, the same play was made into a two-hour television movie that aired on NBC. The writers suggested Lee J. Cobb and Bing Crosby for the role of Columbo, but Cobb was unavailable, and Crosby turned it down because he felt it would take too much time away from golf. Director Richard Irving convinced Levinson and Link that Falk, who excitedly said he "would kill to play that cop", could pull it off even though he was much younger than the writers had in mind.

Originally a one-off movie of the week, Prescription: Murder has Falk's Columbo pitted against a psychiatrist (Gene Barry). In this movie, the psychiatrist gives the new audience a perfect description of Columbo's character. Due to the success of this film, NBC requested that a pilot for a potential series be made to see if the character could be sustained on a regular basis, leading to the 1971 ninety-minute television production, Ransom for a Dead Man, with Lee Grant playing the killer. The popularity of the second film prompted the creation of a regular series on NBC, that premiered in September 1971 as part of The NBC Mystery Movie wheel series rotation: McCloud, McMillan & Wife, and other whodunits.

According to TV Guide, the original plan was that a new Columbo episode would air every week. However, Falk refused to commit to such a busy schedule given his steady work in motion pictures. As a result, the network decided to air Columbo segments once a month on Wednesday nights. The high quality of Columbo, McMillan & Wife, and McCloud was due in large part to the extra time spent on each episode. The term wheel show had been previously coined to describe this format, but no previous or subsequent wheel show achieved the longevity or success of The NBC Mystery Movie.

Columbo was an immediate hit in the Nielsen ratings and Falk won an Emmy Award for his role in the show's first season. In its second year, the Mystery Movie series was moved to Sunday nights, where it then remained during its seven-season run. The show became the anchor of NBC's Sunday night lineup. Columbo aired regularly from 1971 to 1978. After NBC canceled it in 1978, Columbo was revived on ABC between 1989 and 2003 for two seasons as part of The ABC Mystery Movie followed by 14 made-for-TV movie "specials".

Columbo's wardrobe was provided by Falk; they were his clothes, including the high-topped shoes and the shabby raincoat, which made its first appearance in Prescription: Murder. Falk said of the raincoat, "I just felt comfortable in it." Falk often ad libbed his character's quirky behaviors—fumbling through his pockets and finding a grocery list, asking to borrow a pencil, or getting distracted by something irrelevant in the room during a tense moment with a suspect. He inserted these idiosyncrasies into his performance to keep his fellow actors off-balance. He felt it helped to make their confused and impatient reactions to Columbo's antics more genuine. According to Levinson, the catchphrase "one more thing" was conceived when he and Link were writing the play: "we had a scene that was too short, and we had already had Columbo make his exit. We were too lazy to retype the scene, so we had him come back and say, 'Oh, just one more thing.' It was never planned."

A few years before his death, Falk expressed interest in returning to the role. In 2007, he claimed he had chosen a script for one last Columbo episode, "Columbo: Hear No Evil". The script was renamed "Columbo's Last Case". ABC declined the project. In response, producers for the series attempted to shop the project to foreign production companies. Falk was diagnosed with dementia in late 2007. During a 2009 trial over his care, physician Stephen Read stated that Falk's condition had deteriorated so badly that he could no longer remember playing a character named Columbo, nor could he identify Columbo. Falk died on June 23, 2011, aged 83.

== Contributors ==
=== Guest stars ===
The series featured many guest stars as murderers and in other roles. Some actors appeared more than once, playing a different character each time. Among those actors are Jack Cassidy, Robert Culp, Tyne Daly, Shera Danese, George Hamilton, Patrick McGoohan, Ray Milland, Leslie Nielsen, Tim O'Connor, Dean Stockwell, and William Shatner.

=== Directors and writers ===
The first season première, "Murder by the Book", was written by Steven Bochco and directed by Steven Spielberg. Jonathan Demme directed the seventh-season episode "Murder Under Glass". Jonathan Latimer was also a writer. Actor Ben Gazzara, a friend of Falk's, directed the episodes "A Friend in Deed" (1974) and "Troubled Waters" (1975). Falk himself directed the last episode of the first season, "Blueprint for Murder," and wrote the episode entitled "It's All in the Game" in Season 10. Actor Nicholas Colasanto, best known for playing Coach on Cheers, directed two episodes, "Swan Song" with Johnny Cash, and "Étude in Black".

Patrick McGoohan directed five episodes (including three of the four in which he played the murderer) and wrote and produced two. Vincent McEveety was a frequent director, and homage was paid to him by a humorous mention of a character with his surname in the episode "Undercover" (which he directed). Two episodes, "No Time to Die" and "Undercover", were based on the 87th Precinct novels by Ed McBain, and thus do not strictly follow the standard Columbo/inverted detective story format.

=== Score composers ===
Columbo episodes contain a variety of music that contributes to the uniqueness of each. The score becomes of particular importance during turning points of the plots. "The Mystery Movie Theme" by Henry Mancini, written for The NBC Mystery Movie series, was used extensively in the whole of 38 episodes, from 1971 to 1977. Unlike the other elements of the Mystery Movie wheel, Columbo never had an official theme as such, although some composers, such as Dick DeBenedictis and Gil Mellé, did write their own signature pieces. Several composers created original music for the series, which was often used along with "The Mystery Movie Theme":

- Dick DeBenedictis (23 episodes, 1972–2003)
- Patrick Williams (9 episodes, 1977–1992)
- Bernardo Segall (10 episodes, 1974–1976)
- Billy Goldenberg (7 episodes, 1971–1974)
- Gil Mellé (4 episodes, 1971–1972)
- Jeff Alexander (1 episode, 1975)
- Oliver Nelson (1 episode, 1972)
- Dave Grusin (1 episode, 1968)
- Robert Prince (1 episode, 1977)
- Jonathan Tunick (1 episode, 1978)
- John Cacavas (3 episodes, 1989–1991)
- James Di Pasquale (2 episodes, 1990)
- Steve Dorff (2 episodes, 1991)
- Dennis Dreith (1 episode, 1990)
- Richard Markowitz (1 episode, 1990)
- David Michael Frank (1 episode, 1990)
- The Crystal Method (1 episode, 2003)

Series Music department included:

- Quincy Jones—composer: "Mystery Movie" theme / "Wednesday Mystery Movie" theme (8 episodes, 1972–1973)
- Henry Mancini – composer: "Mystery Movie" theme / "Sunday Mystery Movie" theme (38 episodes, 1971–1977)
- Hal Mooney – music supervisor (27 episodes, 1972–1976)
- Mike Post – composer: "Mystery Movie" theme (9 episodes, 1989–1990)

Patrick Williams received two Emmys nominations for Outstanding Music Composition for a Series in 1978 (for "Try and Catch Me") and 1989 (for "Murder, Smoke and Shadows"). Billy Goldenberg was nominated in the same category in 1972 for "Lady in Waiting".

Columbo also featured an unofficial signature tune, the British children's song "This Old Man". It was introduced in the episode "Any Old Port in a Storm" in 1973, and the detective can be heard humming or whistling it often in subsequent films. Falk said it was a melody he personally enjoyed and one day it became a part of his character. The tune was also used in various score arrangements throughout the three decades of the series, including opening and closing credits. A version of it, titled "Columbo", was created by Patrick Williams.

== Reception ==
=== Awards and nominations ===
Columbo received numerous awards and nominations from 1971 to 2005, including 13 Emmys, two Golden Globe Awards, two Edgar Awards and a TV Land Award nomination in 2005 for Peter Falk.

Awards and nominations

Primetime Emmy Awards
Year	Category	Nominee	Result
1971	Outstanding Single Performance by an Actress in a Leading Role	Lee Grant in "Ransom for a Dead Man"	Nominated
1972	Outstanding Series – Drama	Everett Chambers, Richard Levinson and William Link	Nominated
1972	Outstanding Continued Performance by an Actor in a Leading Role in a Dramatic Series	Peter Falk	Won
1972	Outstanding Directorial Achievement in Drama – A Single Program of a Series with Continuing Characters and/or Theme	Edward M. Abroms, for "Short Fuse"	Nominated
1972	Outstanding Writing Achievement in Drama	Steven Bochco for "Murder by the Book"	Nominated
1972	Outstanding Writing Achievement in Drama	Jackson Gillis for "Suitable for Framing"	Nominated
1972	Outstanding Writing Achievement in Drama	Richard Levinson and William Link for "Death Lends a Hand"	Won
1972	Outstanding New Series	Everett Chambers, Richard Levinson and William Link	Nominated
1972	Outstanding Achievement in Cinematography for Entertainment Programming – For a Series or a Single Program of a Series	Lloyd Ahern for "Blueprint for Murder"	Won
1972	Outstanding Achievement in Film Editing for Entertainment Programming – For a Series or a Single Program of a Series	Edward M. Abroms for "Death Lends a Hand"	Won
1972	Outstanding Achievement in Music Composition – For a Series or a Single Program of a Series	Billy Goldenberg for "Lady in Waiting"	Nominated
1973	Outstanding Drama Series - Continuing	Dean Hargrove	Nominated
1973	Outstanding Continued Performance by an Actor in a Leading Role (Drama Series - Continuing)	Peter Falk	Nominated
1973	Outstanding Directorial Achievement in Drama – A Single Program of a Series with Continuing Characters and/or Theme	Edward M. Abroms for "The Most Dangerous Match"	Nominated
1973	Outstanding Writing Achievement in Drama	Steven Bochco for "Étude in Black"	Nominated
1973	Outstanding Achievement in Costume Design	Grady Hunt for "Dagger of the Mind"	Nominated
1974	Outstanding Limited Series	Douglas Benton, Edward K. Dodds, Dean Hargrove, Roland Kibbee and Robert F. O'Neill	Won
1974	Best Lead Actor in a Limited Series	Peter Falk	Nominated
1974	Best Cinematography for Entertainment Programming – For a Series or a Single Program of a Series	Harry L. Wolf for "Any Old Port in a Storm"	Won
1975	Outstanding Limited Series	Everett Chambers, Edward K. Dodds, Dean Hargrove and Roland Kibbee	Nominated
1975	Outstanding Lead Actor in a Limited Series	Peter Falk	Won
1975	Outstanding Single Performance by a Supporting Actor in a Comedy or Drama Series	Patrick McGoohan in "By Dawn's Early Light"	Won
1975	Outstanding Achievement in Cinematography for Entertainment Programming for a Series	Richard C. Glouner for "Playback"	Won
1975	Outstanding Individual Achievement in Art Direction or Scenic Design – For a Single Episode of a Comedy, Drama or Limited Series	Jerry Adams and Michael Baugh for "Playback"	Nominated
1976	Outstanding Drama Series	Everett Chambers	Nominated
1976	Outstanding Lead Actor in a Drama Series	Peter Falk	Won
1977	Outstanding Drama Series	Everett Chambers	Nominated
1977	Outstanding Lead Actor in a Drama Series	Peter Falk	Nominated
1978	Outstanding Drama Series	Richard Alan Simmons	Nominated
1978	Outstanding Lead Actor in a Drama Series	Peter Falk	Nominated
1978	Outstanding Film Editing in a Drama Series	Robert Watts, for "How to Dial a Murder"	Nominated
1978	Outstanding Achievement in Music Composition for a Series (Dramatic Underscore)	Patrick Williams for "Try and Catch Me"	Nominated
1989	Outstanding Achievement in Music Composition for a Series (Dramatic Underscore)	Patrick Williams for "Murder, Smoke and Shadows"	Nominated
1990	Outstanding Lead Actor in a Drama Series	Peter Falk	Won
1990	Outstanding Guest Actor in a Drama Series	Patrick McGoohan in "Agenda for Murder"	Won
1991	Outstanding Lead Actor in a Drama Series	Peter Falk	Nominated
1991	Outstanding Guest Actor in a Drama Series	Dabney Coleman in "Columbo and the Murder of a Rock Star"	Nominated
1994	Outstanding Lead Actor in a Drama Series	Peter Falk	Nominated
1994	Outstanding Guest Actress in a Drama Series	Faye Dunaway in "It's All in the Game"	Won
Edgar Allan Poe Awards
Year	Category	Nominee	Result
1972	Best Episode in a TV Series	Steven Bochco, for "Murder by the Book"	Nominated
1974	Best Episode in a TV Series	Jackson Gillis, for "Requiem for a Falling Star"	Nominated
1979	Best Episode in a TV Series	Robert Van Scoyk, for "Murder Under Glass"	Won
1979	Special Edgars	Richard Levinson & William Link for "Columbo and Ellery Queen TV series"	Won
Golden Globe Awards
Year	Category	Nominee	Result
1972	Actor in a Leading Role – Drama Series Or Television Movie	Peter Falk	Nominated
1973	Best Television Series – Drama		Won
1973	Best Performance by an Actor in a Television Series – Drama	Peter Falk	Won
1974	Best Television Series – Drama		Nominated
1974	Best Performance by an Actor in a Television Series – Drama	Peter Falk	Nominated
1975	Best Television Series – Drama		Nominated
1975	Best Performance by an Actor in a Television Series – Drama	Peter Falk	Nominated
1976	Best Performance by an Actor in a Television Series – Drama	Peter Falk	Nominated
1978	Best Television Series – Drama		Nominated
1978	Best Performance by an Actor in a Television Series – Drama	Peter Falk	Nominated
1991	Best Performance by an Actor in a TV-Series – Drama	Peter Falk	Nominated
1992	Best Performance by an Actor in a Mini-Series or Motion Picture Made for TV	Peter Falk	Nominated
1994	Best Mini-Series or Motion Picture Made for TV	"It's All in the Game"	Nominated
1994	Best Performance by an Actor in a Mini-Series or Motion Picture Made for TV	Peter Falk, for "It's All in the Game"	Nominated
1994	Best Performance by an Actress in a Mini-Series or Motion Picture Made for TV	Faye Dunaway, for "It's All in the Game"	Nominated

The 1971 episode "Murder by the Book", directed by Steven Spielberg, was ranked No. 16 on TV Guide's 100 Greatest Episodes of All-Time and in 1999, the magazine ranked Lt. Columbo No. 7 on its 50 Greatest TV Characters of All Time list. In 2012, the program was ranked the third-best cop or legal show on Best in TV: The Greatest TV Shows of Our Time. In 2013, TV Guide included it in its list of The 60 Greatest Dramas of All Time and ranked it 33rd on its list of the 60 Best Series. Also in 2013, the Writers Guild of America ranked it 57th on its list of 101 Best Written TV Series. In December 2023, Variety ranked Columbo #85 on its list of the 100 greatest TV shows of all time.

=== International reception ===
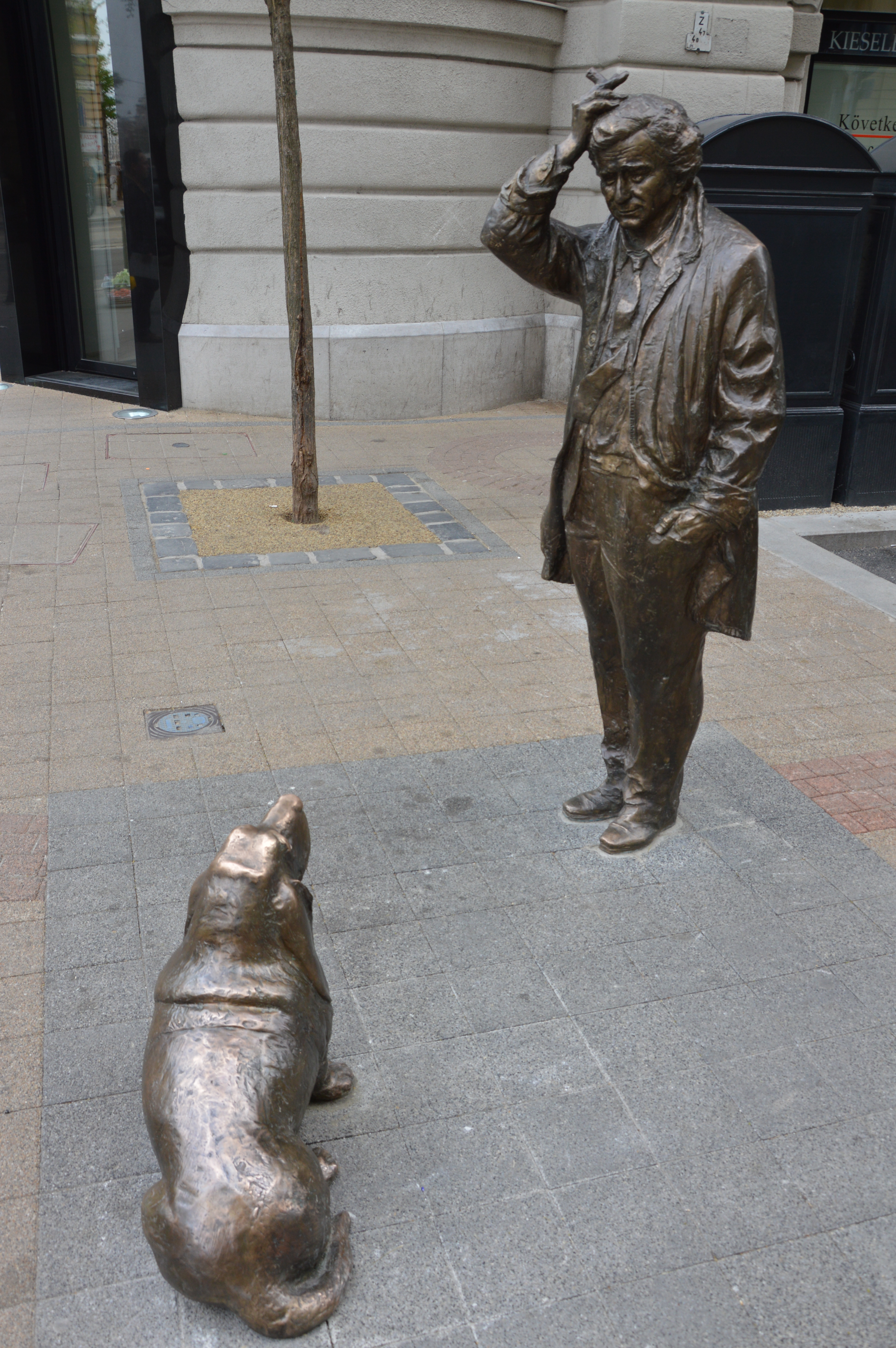
Peter Falk statue as Columbo with his dog, Dog, in Budapest, Hungary

Columbo was an international success during its initial run and was syndicated in 44 countries. According to a 1989 article in the Chicago Tribune, when production of Columbo stopped and no new episodes could be broadcast in Romania, the government feared that riots could break out, and Falk was asked by the U.S. State Department to record a special announcement to be broadcast on Romanian television. The story was repeated by Falk in an appearance on Late Show with David Letterman in 1995, and in Falk's memoir Just One More Thing. While the cable containing Falk's speech was released as part of the United States diplomatic cables leak, it is disputed whether riots or any kind of mass protest were imminent due to the cancellation of Columbo.

A statue of Lieutenant Columbo and his dog was unveiled in 2014 on Miksa Falk Street in Budapest, Hungary. According to Antal Rogán, then-district mayor of the city, Peter Falk may have been related to Hungarian writer and politician Miksa Falk, although there is no evidence yet to prove it.

=== Renewed popularity in 2020s ===
In the 2020s, the renewed popularity of Columbo with much younger audiences has been noted by several media publications. Collider and the BBC emphasized the timeless nature of Peter Falk's performance. GameRant suggested that the show is "comfort viewing" and that its repetitive nature easily engenders Internet memes.

== Home media ==
=== VHS ===
On August 3, 1994, MCA/Universal Home Video released the episode "Murder by the Book" on VHS.

=== DVD ===
As of January 10, 2012, Universal Studios had released all 69 episodes of Columbo on DVD. The episodes are released in the same chronological order as they were originally broadcast. On October 16, 2012, Universal released Columbo—The Complete Series on DVD in Region 1.

Because the Columbo episodes from 1989 to 2003 were aired very infrequently, different DVD sets have been released around the world. In many Region 2 and Region 4 countries, all episodes have now been released as 10 seasons, with the 10th comprising the last 14 episodes, from "Columbo Goes to College" (1990) to "Columbo Likes the Nightlife" (2003). In France and The Netherlands (also Region 2), the DVDs were grouped differently and released as 12 seasons.

In Region 1, all episodes from Seasons 8 on are grouped differently; the episodes that originally aired on ABC were released under the title COLUMBO: The Mystery Movie Collection.

Season	Eps.	Year	DVD release			
Season	Eps.	Year	DVD name	Region 1	Region 2	Region 4
Pilots	2	1968–71	The Complete First Season	September 7, 2004	September 13, 2004	December 3, 2004
1	7	1971–72	The Complete First Season	September 7, 2004	September 13, 2004	December 3, 2004
2	8	1972–73	The Complete Second Season	March 8, 2005	July 18, 2005	July 13, 2005
3	8	1973–74	The Complete Third Season	August 9, 2005	November 14, 2005	July 20, 2006
4	6	1974–75	The Complete Fourth Season	March 14, 2006	September 18, 2006	September 19, 2006
5	6	1975–76	The Complete Fifth Season	June 27, 2006	February 12, 2007	March 21, 2007
6	3	1976–77	The Complete Sixth & Seventh Seasons	November 21, 2006	April 30, 2007	May 2, 2007
7	5	1977–78	The Complete Sixth & Seventh Seasons	November 21, 2006	April 30, 2007	May 2, 2007
8	4	1989	The Mystery Movie Collection 1989 (R1/R4); The Complete Eighth Season (R2)	April 24, 2007	March 31, 2008	July 4, 2008
9	6	1989–90	The Mystery Movie Collection 1990 (R1); The Complete Ninth Season (R2/R4)	February 3, 2009	March 30, 2009	May 6, 2009
10 + specials	14	1990–93	The Mystery Movie Collection 1991–93 (R1); The Complete Tenth Season – Volume 1 (R2/R4)	February 8, 2011	June 15, 2009	July 28, 2009
10 + specials	14	1994–2003	The Mystery Movie Collection 1994–2003 (R1); The Complete Tenth Season – Volume 2 (R2/R4)	January 10, 2012	July 27, 2009	November 28, 2009
Complete series	69	1968–2003	Columbo: The Complete Series	October 16, 2012	October 19, 2009	December 7, 2016

=== Blu-ray ===
The complete series was released on Blu-ray in Japan in 2011 as a ten-season set, taken from new HD masters and original 1.33:1 (4:3) aspect ratio, apart from the 1989–2003 episodes presented in 1.78:1 (16:9)). The set contains 35 discs and is presented in a faux-wooden cigar box. It features a brochure with episode details, and a script for the Japanese version of Prescription: Murder. Special features include the original 96-minute version of "Étude In Black" and the original The NBC Mystery Movie title sequence. In addition, many episodes include isolated music and sound-effects tracks. Before this set's release, only the episodes up to "Murder, a Self-Portrait" were released on DVD in Japan.

In late 2023, specialist film distributor Kino Lorber released the first seven seasons of Columbo on Blu-ray in North America, using an NBCUniversal remaster. Although it was planned that the Blu-ray would have a commentary track for each episode, it was later cancelled for unexplained reasons. In mid-2024, Kino Lorber released a Blu-ray set of the remaining seasons in North America.

== Other appearances ==
=== Stage ===
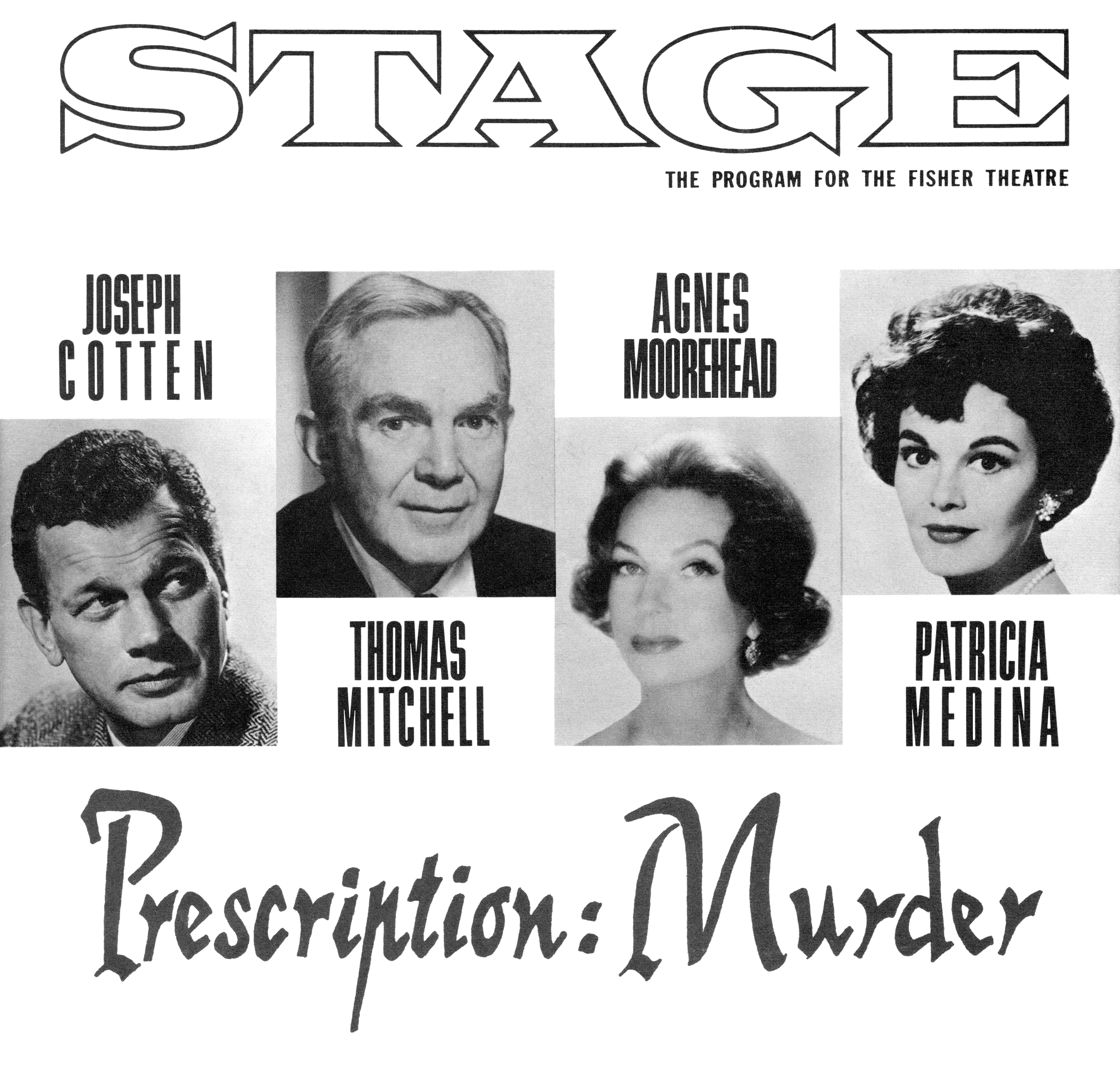
Program cover for Prescription: Murder, presented in March 1962 at Detroit's Fisher Theatre during a national tour. Plans for a Broadway run were abandoned due to the illness of Thomas Mitchell.

The Columbo character first appeared on stage in 1962 in Prescription: Murder with Thomas Mitchell in the role of Columbo.

In 2007, Link wrote a new Columbo play entitled Columbo Takes the Rap, which premiered during the inaugural International Mystery Writers Festival in Owensboro, Kentucky. Owing to Falk's advanced age and ill health, Chicago actor Norm Boucher played the lieutenant, giving a portrayal Link warmly approved of. The plot saw Columbo investigating the murder of a rapper by his record producer. Despite critical acclaim, the announced plans for a subsequent nationwide tour and Broadway run fell through for unspecified reasons.

In 2010, Prescription: Murder was revived for a tour of the United Kingdom with Dirk Benedict and later John Guerrasio as Columbo.

=== Television ===
Falk appeared as Columbo in an Alias sketch produced for a 2003 TV special celebrating the 50th anniversary of ABC.

Falk appeared in character as Columbo in 1977 at The Dean Martin Celebrity Roast of Frank Sinatra.

=== Cinema ===
While Falk generally appeared as himself in Wim Wenders's 1987 movie Wings of Desire, there is also a short cameo appearance in the film where Falk is specifically recognized and greeted as "Columbo" by a group of young men passing by. In another scene, a trapeze artist calls him “Lieutenant” and briefly asks for his help in finding someone. In another scene outside the movie set where the fictional used version of Peter Falk converses with the film's main character, a group of children can be heard chanting, “Co-lum-bo! Co-lum-bo!” over and over.

=== Books ===
A Columbo series of books was published by MCA Publishing, written by authors Alfred Lawrence, Henry Clements and Lee Hays. This series of books, with the first title published in 1972, was mostly adapted from the TV series.

Columbo was also used as the protagonist for a series of novels published between 1994 and 1999 by Forge Books, an imprint of Tor Books. All of these books were written by William Harrington.

William Link, the co-creator of the series, wrote a collection of Columbo short stories, titled The Columbo Collection, which was published in May 2010 by Crippen & Landru, a specialty mystery publisher.

=== Video games ===
A game for the Amiga computer was in development but never released. Early discussions in Amiga Power suggested it would be a point and click adventure game where Columbo solves a murder with the assistance of his dog and other characters from the show.

== Mrs. Columbo spin-off ==
Mrs. Columbo, a spin-off TV series starring Kate Mulgrew, aired in 1979 and was canceled after only thirteen episodes. Lt. Columbo was never seen on Mrs. Columbo; each episode featured the resourceful Mrs. Columbo, here given the first name Kate, solving a murder mystery she encountered in her work as a newspaper reporter. Connections with the original Columbo series were made obvious: the glaring presence of Columbo's car in the driveway, the dog, and Mrs. Columbo emptying ashtrays containing the famous green cigar butts—all featured in the show's opening sequence. References were also made to Kate's husband being a police lieutenant. The public didn't warm to this interpretation of the character, and in the second season all Columbo references were abruptly dropped. The show's title became Kate Loves A Mystery, Kate's last name became Callahan, and she was no longer married to a police lieutenant.

== The Trivia Encyclopedia lawsuit ==
Columbo's first name is notably never mentioned verbally in the series, but "Frank Columbo" or "Lt. Frank Columbo" can occasionally be seen in print on his police ID (though this was not generally evident to viewers until the advent of DVDs, which could be freeze-framed to present a sharp image of the ID badge). 'Lt Frank Columbo' is also seen written as the name of the investigating officer on an evidence bag, in the TV movie Grand Deceptions. This ambiguity surrounding Columbo's first name led the creator of The Trivia Encyclopedia, Fred L. Worth, to include a false entry that listed "Philip Columbo" as Columbo's full name as a copyright trap. When the board game Trivial Pursuit included "Philip" as the answer to the question, "What was Columbo's first name?", Worth launched a $300 million lawsuit against the creators of the game. The creators of the game argued that while they did use The Trivia Encyclopedia as one of their sources, facts are not copyrightable and there was nothing improper about using an encyclopedia in the production of a fact-based game. The district court judge agreed and the decision was upheld by the United States Court of Appeals for the Ninth Circuit in September 1987. Worth petitioned the Supreme Court of the United States to review the case, but the Court declined, denying certiorari in March 1988.

Ironically, Season 2 of Mrs. Columbo, which was renamed as Kate the Detective and Kate Loves a Mystery that season after it had ended all links to Columbo, had Kate Callahan (played by Kate Mulgrew) mention her ex-husband's first name as "Philip".

== See also ==
- Furuhata Ninzaburō, a Japanese television series often referred to as the Japanese version of Columbo
