= Headed for a Hearse =

1935 novel by Jonathan Latimer

- Author: Jonathan Latimer
- Language: English
- Publisher: Doubleday Doran
- Publication date: 9 August 1935
- Publication place: United States
- Media type: Print (hardback)
- Preceded by: Murder in the Madhouse
- Followed by: The Lady in the Morgue

Headed for a Hearse is a murder mystery by Jonathan Latimer, the second in the series to feature Detective Bill Crane. It was first published by Doubleday Doran as part of the Crime Club in 1935. In 1937 it served as the basis for the film, The Westland Case.

== The novel ==
In his 1990 introduction to the novel, Max Allan Collins locates the book as a typical fiction of the 1930s, but one that straddles genres in a "successful melding of the hardboiled novel and the classic drawing room mystery". It is of its time, the era of the Great Depression in the United States, in its compensatory descriptions of conspicuous consumption, the wealthy lifestyle and lavish dining of the rich. But it also contains an element of exaggerated parody, not just of the tough talking and alcoholic exploits of the American detective team, but also of the tradition of the English detective novel. In place of Sherlock Holmes resorting to his armchair, stimulated to an exercise in pure rationality by a pipeful of tobacco, Latimer's William Crane drinks himself into sobriety, "a beautiful separation of body and mind", and then, once the details of the crime begin to fall into place, resolutely refuses any more alcohol.

== Plot ==
At the center of the story is a "locked room mystery" involving Chicago stockbroker Robert Westland, who has been convicted of the murder of his estranged wife. Sentenced to the electric chair and with only six days left to establish his innocence, he brings in criminal lawyer Charles Finklestein, who in turn engages two agency detectives from New York, William Crane and 'Doc' Williams. The evidence against Westland is that his wife's body was found shot in a locked apartment to which only he and his wife had keys, where he had been decoyed on the night of the murder by a phone call that seemed at first to have come from his fiancée, Emily Lou Martin. Additional evidence had come from neighbors beneath, who had heard a shot at the time of the killing. The weapon used was a wartime Webley of a type owned by Westland, which has now disappeared from his desk.

Westland bribes the prison warden to allow his legal team to use an office there for conferences with interested parties. These include his stockbroking partners, Ronald Woodbury and Richard Bolston; His cousin Lawrence Wharton; chief clerk Amos Sprague; his former secretary Margot Brentino, and his fiancée Emily Lou. These in their various ways are recruited to gather sufficient evidence for the state governor to pardon Westland.

The reason Westland abandons his despair so as to attempt exoneration is that Emily Lou has received a letter claiming to have evidence of his innocence. But when the two women, accompanied by the detectives, visit Petro's Restaurant to arrange a meeting with the writer, professional killers shoot him before they can talk. On the following day there is an attempt to gun down the detectives in the street, but they recognise the men as from Petro's and, with the cooperation of a violent labor leader also on death row with Westland, they return to Petro's with thugs for protection. There they learn that Petro had mistaken them for members of a rival gang who had come to identify the slain Manny Grant for the killers.

Yet another murder later occurs when Sprague is run down in the street while carrying evidence that points to a possible motive to get Westland convicted. It eventually emerges that many of Mrs Westland's financial holdings had been substituted for stolen scrip sold on by criminals at a 90% discount. But a solution is also brought nearer when it is realised that on the night of the killing the clocks had changed for daylight saving and the witnesses to the shot had not put forward their clock. The shooting had therefore taken place after Westland had left his wife's apartment.

After thinking the problem over, Crane deduces that the shooting was done with a different Webley and that Westland's had been stolen by the real murderer and thrown into the Chicago River so as to make him suspect. Taking a taxi back and forth over the river bridges, Crane establishes where this must have taken place and hires a diver to find the weapon. Then, in a last minute dash to Peoria, Illinois, he locates a firm that sold a similar weapon at about the time of the murder, retrieves the slugs for police identification and returns with employees to identify the man who had bought it.

At the final hour, all the parties are assembled at the prison and Crane denounces Bolston and Emily Lou, who has secretly married Bolston and stands to inherit the bulk of Westland's fortune. Bolston had been unwilling to retrench his lifestyle even at a time of economic turndown and had been employing increasingly criminal means to keep himself financially afloat: embezzlement, murder and conspiracy to have an innocent man condemned by planting incriminating evidence. Unable to shake the testimony of Crane's witnesses and experts, Bolston is arrested and Westland is reprieved within minutes of the planned execution.

== Bibliography ==
- Bill Brubaker, Stewards of the House: The Detective Fiction of Jonathan Latimer, Popular Press 1993, pp.38-50
- James A. Kaser, The Chicago of Fiction: A Resource Guide, Scarecrow Press, 2011, p.208
