= Night in New Orleans =

1942 film by William Clemens

- Theatrical release poster
- Directed by: William Clemens
- Screenplay by: Jonathan Latimer
- Produced by: Sol C. Siegel
- Starring: Preston Foster; Patricia Morison; Albert Dekker; Charles Butterworth; Dooley Wilson; Paul Hurst
- Cinematography: Merritt B. Gerstad; Leo Tover
- Edited by: Ellsworth Hoagland
- Music by: Paul Sawtell
- Production company: Paramount Pictures
- Distributed by: Paramount Pictures
- Release date: July 1, 1942
- Running time: 75 minutes
- Country: United States
- Language: English

Night in New Orleans is a 1942 American crime film directed by William Clemens and loosely adapted by Jonathan Latimer from the 1940 novel Sing a Song of Homicide by James R. Langham. The film stars Preston Foster, Patricia Morison, Albert Dekker, Charles Butterworth, Dooley Wilson and Paul Hurst. The film was released on July 1, 1942, by Paramount Pictures.

== Plot ==
Steve Abbott and Bill Richards are both lieutenants in the New Orleans police department, colleagues and rivals alike. Steve, seeking love letters his wife Ethel once wrote to a Phillip Wallace, finds the man's dead body and immediately becomes Bill's prime suspect. Both report to Dan Odell, their chief.

Ethel, an amateur detective, investigates on her own while her husband's under suspicion. The trail leads to the Mississippi Inn on the riverfront, where house man Shadrach Jones proves helpful to her. Steve's suspicions turn toward the dead man's brothers, George and Edward, particularly to the former, who runs the casino, helped by girlfriend Janet Price. His boss, Odell, meanwhile, sternly advises Ethel to stay away from the case.

After the slain body of George is discovered, a costumed Edward tries to escape during the Mardi Gras parade as the detectives deduce him to be the killer of his brothers. Steve and Bill join forces for his capture, with an assist from Ethel.

== Cast ==
- Preston Foster as Police Lt. Steve Abbott
- Patricia Morison as Ethel Abbott
- Albert Dekker as Police Lieutenant William Richards
- Charles Butterworth as Edward Wallace
- Dooley Wilson as Shadrach Jones
- Paul Hurst as Sergeant Casper Riordan
- Jean Phillips as Janet Price
- Cecil Kellaway as Dan Odell
- William Wright as George Wallace
- Noble Johnson as Carney
- Joe Pope as Carlson
- Yola d'Avril as Mme. Lamballe
- Emory Parnell as Jensen

== Reception ==
T.S. of The New York Times said, "After changing its name three times, Night in New Orleans descended upon the Rialto yesterday. An appropriate title it is, too, because the picture is about as lucid as a blackout. As a story of murder and municipal skulduggery in Huey Long's one-time parish, it is a thriller so haphazardly contrived, so studded with loose clues and endless coincidence, that even the author seems to have been confused by his meandering fable. Around Preston Foster and Patricia Morison, as a police lieutenant and harebrained spouse who bear a wee resemblance to Mr. and Mrs. North, the producers have rigged an unsteady story of sweet-faced old crooks, blond honky-tonk floozies, thick-headed and toughspoken cops, and the inevitable colored servant who makes sounds of appropriate comic alarm when the lights go out or a body suddenly splashes off a fogbound wharf."
