= The Westland Case =

1937 American film directed by Christy Cabanne

- Film poster
- Directed by: Christy Cabanne
- Screenplay by: Robertson White
- Based on: Headed for a Hearse by Jonathan Latimer
- Produced by: Irving Starr; Larry Fox
- Starring: Preston Foster; Frank Jenks; Carol Hughes
- Cinematography: Ira Morgan
- Edited by: Otis Garrett
- Music by: Charles Previn
- Production company: Crime Club Productions
- Distributed by: Universal Pictures
- Release date: October 31, 1937
- Running time: 63 minutes
- Country: United States
- Language: English

The Westland Case is a 1937 American mystery film directed by Christy Cabanne and starring Preston Foster, Frank Jenks, and Carol Hughes.

== Plot ==
Noted defense attorney Charlie Frazee receives an anonymous note hinting that death row inmate Robert Westland might be innocent of the wife-murder he was convicted for. Frazee takes the note seriously and hires private detectives Bill Crane and Doc Williams to re-investigate the case. A sympathetic Warden gives the investigative trio unlimited visiting rights at the prison for the six days Westland has left.

Things get off to a bad start. The informer who wrote the note is publicly shot to death in a crowded restaurant. And when the condemned man's personal accountant announces that he will soon reveal evidence clearing Westland, he is promptly killed by a hit and run driver.

And the crime scene has been contaminated by the hasty re-rental of the apartment to blonde party girl Agatha Hogan, to whom all three investigators take an immediate shine. But not to the elderly aunt she shares the apartment with.

Crane has better luck trying to trace the murder weapon, a British-made Webley of unique caliber. Westland's personal Webley is missing and is presumed to be the murder weapon. A confused cab driver is hired by Crane to drive to the same address by multiple routes. Crane is looking for a spot where somebody might dispose of a gun, and a bridge overlooking the river seems likely.

Crane hires a diver, who recovers a different Webley pistol that is traced to a Joliet, Illinois firm. The uniqueness of the gun helps the owners of the firm remember the gun and who purchased it. And that he tried out the gun on the firm's target range

The unique slugs are recovered and identified by ballistics expert Major Lee as the murder weapon. With 15 minutes before execution, Crane identifies Westland's business partner Richard Bolston as the killer, and Westland's secretary Bentine as his secret wife/confederate. The motive was that Bolston had been counterfeiting bonds to shore up a failing business, and feared discovery. The accountant's surprise audit had uncovered this, leading to his death.

Westland is freed and leaves with the loyal girlfriend Emily Lou who had stuck by him through and through. And to everyone's surprise, Frazee leaves with the beautiful Agatha Hogan.

== Cast ==
- Preston Foster as Bill Crane
- Frank Jenks as Doc Williams
- Carol Hughes as Emily Lou Martin
- Barbara Pepper as Agatha Hogan
- Astrid Allwyn as Bentine
- Clarence Wilson as Charlie Frazee
- Theodore Von Eltz as Robert Westland
- George Meeker as Richard Bolston
- Russell Hicks as Woodbury
- Selmer Jackson as Warden

== Production ==
In 1937, Universal Pictures made a deal with the Crime Club who published whodunnit novels. Universal were granted the right to select four of their yearly published novels to adapt into films. The unit responsible for these films was producer Irving Starr. Eleven films were made in the series between 1937 and 1939. The Westland Case was the first in the series and was based on the Jonathan Latimer novel Headed for a Hearse.

The first films in the series featured Preston Foster as Bill Crane and Frank Jenks as Doc Williams were cast as the wisecracking New York city detectives. These characters would appear in two other films in the series: The Lady in the Morgue and The Last Warning.

== Release ==
The Westland Case was released on October 31, 1937.
