= Black Is the Fashion for Dying =

1959 novel by Jonathan Latimer

- Author: Jonathan Latimer
- Language: English
- Publisher: Random House
- Publication date: 1959
- Publication place: United States
- Media type: Print (hardback)
- Pages: 240
- Preceded by: Sinners and Shrouds

Black Is the Fashion for Dying is a mystery novel by Jonathan Latimer and first published by Random House in 1959. Latimer's last novel, it drew on the author's experiences as a contract screenwriter in Hollywood.

The novel was published in England by Methuen as The Mink Lined Coffin in 1960.

== Plot ==
While working on an eleventh-hour rewrite on the script for a problem-plagued film, Tiger in the Night, screenwriter Robert Blake is interrupted by the appearance of a disoriented young blond woman. Meanwhile, the film's star, Caresse Garnet, may be allowing her diva-like behavior to anger one too many people.

Black Is the Fashion for Dying is told through limited third-person point-of-view narration, with each chapter focused on the experience of a different character. The title originates from a line of dialog that Richard Blake devises when he is completing the re-write on Tiger in the Night.

== Reception ==
The novel was well received by critics. Mary Thurber, writing for the Santa Rosa Press Democrat, said the novel was "written with economy of words and the wittiest dialogue I've seen in a long time," and guessed favorably at its authenticity: "How did Hollywood characters really talk? I'd like to think that they are like those in Jonathan Latimer's Black Is the Fashion for Dying." The reviewer in The Anniston Star praised it as "top-notch whodunit reading" composed in a "sardonic, able style."

While Latimer's writing abilities were nearly universally praised, his story craft was criticized by some. The Napa Valley Register reported that "Latimer continues to write with swift-paced action, racy dialogue and dramatic characterization, but his plot is weak." The San Antonio Express and News called the book "entertaining" and "highly readable," but cautioned readers that "true mystery fans are not likely to find the 'impossible' murder too hard to solve."
