= The Trivia Encyclopedia =

1974 book by Fred L. Worth

- Author: Fred L. Worth
- Published: 1974
- Publisher: Brooke House
- Pages: 303
- ISBN: 0912588063
- OCLC: 2420191
- Dewey Decimal: 031
- LC Class: 74019850

The Trivia Encyclopedia is a 1974 book written by Fred L. Worth.

A best-selling book in its day, The Trivia Encyclopedia was brought back to public consciousness in the 1980s, when author Worth unsuccessfully sued the makers of Trivial Pursuit for copyright infringement. Worth claimed that they had sourced their questions from his books, even to the point of reproducing misprints and typographical errors. The "smoking gun" was Trivial Pursuit's assertion that the TV character Columbo had the first name "Philip". This "fact" originally appeared in Worth's book, but it was actually an invention of Worth's that was entirely untrue.

== Columbo controversy ==
Lt. Columbo's first name was never spoken aloud in the TV series Columbo. When pressed, he would insist that it was "Lieutenant".

The "fact" that the Lieutenant's full name was "Philip Columbo" was planted by Worth in his book (and its sequels) in an attempt to catch out anyone who might try to violate his copyright.

In 1984, he filed a $300 million lawsuit against the distributors of the board game Trivial Pursuit, claiming that they had stolen their questions from his books. The apparent ace up his sleeve was a Trivial Pursuit reference to the TV character of "Philip Columbo"—despite the first name "Philip" being an invention of Worth's.

The makers of Trivial Pursuit did not deny that they sourced material from Worth's book. Instead, they argued that:

1. Facts themselves are not eligible for receiving a copyright
2. There was nothing improper about using Worth's book simply as one of the many sources from which the game's fact-based material originated. The judge agreed, also noting that Trivial Pursuit was a substantially different product from an encyclopedia—the board game used and arranged their fact-based material in a very different manner from any of the sources it used. The judge ruled in favor of Trivial Pursuit. The decision was appealed, and in September 1987 the United States Court of Appeals for the Ninth Circuit upheld the ruling.

Worth asked the Supreme Court of the United States to review the case, but the Court declined, denying certiorari in March 1988.

However, the "Philip Columbo" misinformation lived on in popular culture, at least for the next several years. Several sources cited the name "Philip Columbo" as the Columbo character's full name, variously claiming that the name was either in the original script for the Columbo stage play Prescription: Murder or that it was visible on his police badge. Neither assertion is true. In fact, close-ups in two episodes of a signature on Columbo's police badge reveal that his name is Frank Columbo. Peugeot even ran a 1980s advertising campaign that mentioned "Lt. Philip Columbo" as the most famous driver of the Peugeot convertible.
