= Red Gardenias =

1939 novel by Jonathan Latimer

- Author: Jonathan Latimer
- Language: English
- Publisher: Doubleday, Doran & Company
- Publication date: 1939
- Publication place: United States
- Media type: Print (hardback)
- Preceded by: The Dead Don't Care

Red Gardenias is a crime novel by Jonathan Latimer. It was the fifth and final novel to feature Latimer's signature character, Detective Bill Crane. First published in 1939, Red Gardenias was reissued in 1991 by International Polygonics, along with several other Latimer titles.

== Plot ==
Perennial drunk Bill Crane teams up with Doc Williams, an old friend, and Ann Fortune, the niece of Crane's boss, to solve a murder in suburban Chicago. First one, then two murders by carbon monoxide poisoning, are linked to organized crime. As the investigation proceeds, Bill and Ann pretend to be husband and wife to avert suspicion, but begin to really fall in love.

The title is derived from the scent of perfume found at the murder scene.
