= Statue of Columbo =

Statue of Lt. Columbo

Coordinates: 47°30′46″N 19°02′56″E

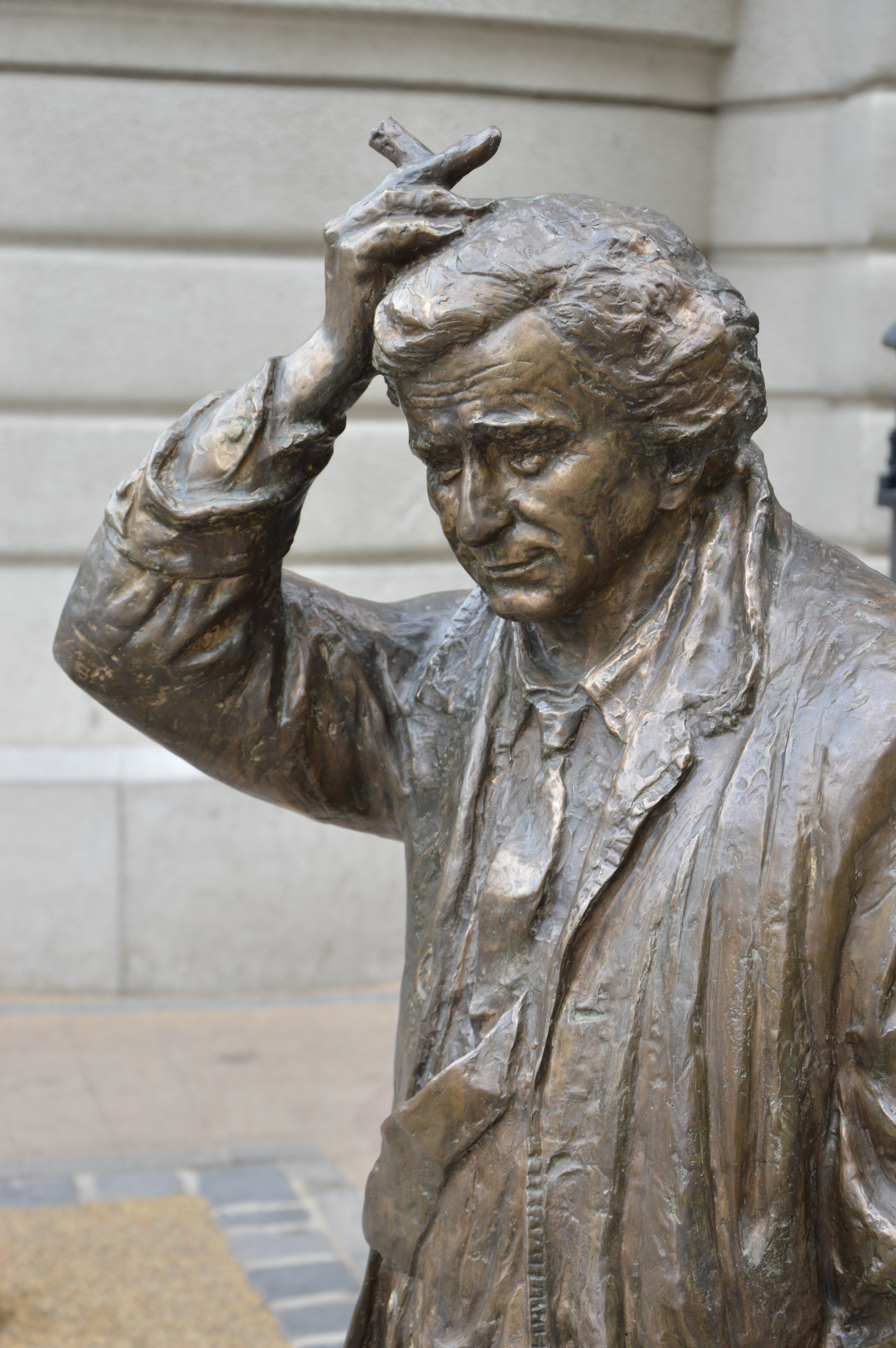

- Location in Budapest
- Artist: Géza Dezső Fekete
- Year: 2014
- Medium: Bronze
- Subject: Lieutenant Columbo (fictional character)
- Location: Budapest

The statue of Columbo is a life-sized bronze work on Falk Miksa Street in Budapest depicting Peter Falk in the role of the fictional police detective Columbo. At the Columbo statue's feet is a statue of Columbo's dog, Dog. The statues, by the sculptor Géza Dezső Fekete, were put up in 2014 as part of a state-sponsored urban renewal project. Though Peter Falk and the street's namesake, 19th century Hungarian politician Miksa Falk, were both Jewish, and the actor Peter Falk had ancestors from Hungary, there is no known family relationship between them. The actor's Hungarian heritage did not derive from the Falk family on his father's side, but through his maternal grandfather.

== Gallery ==
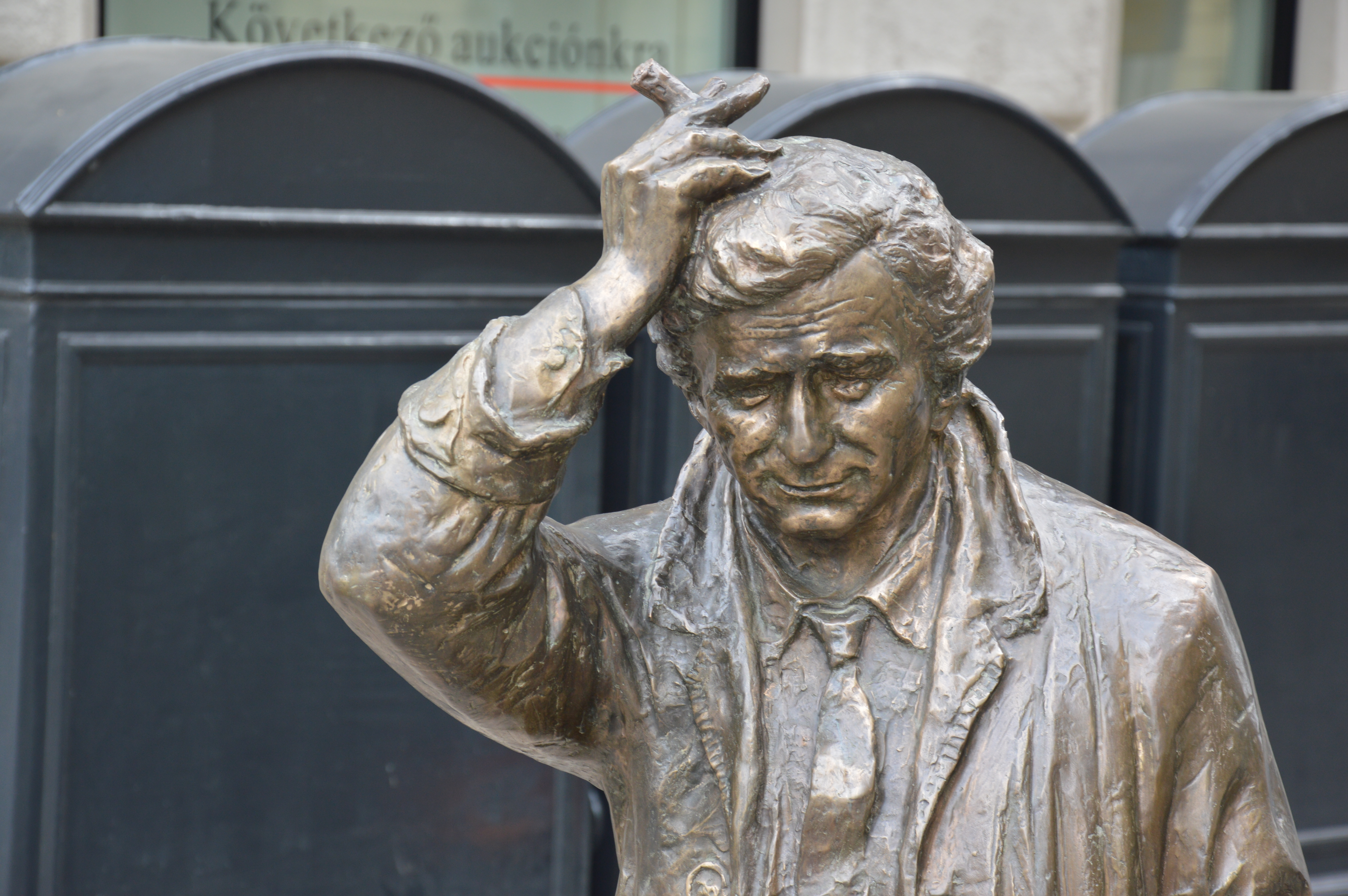

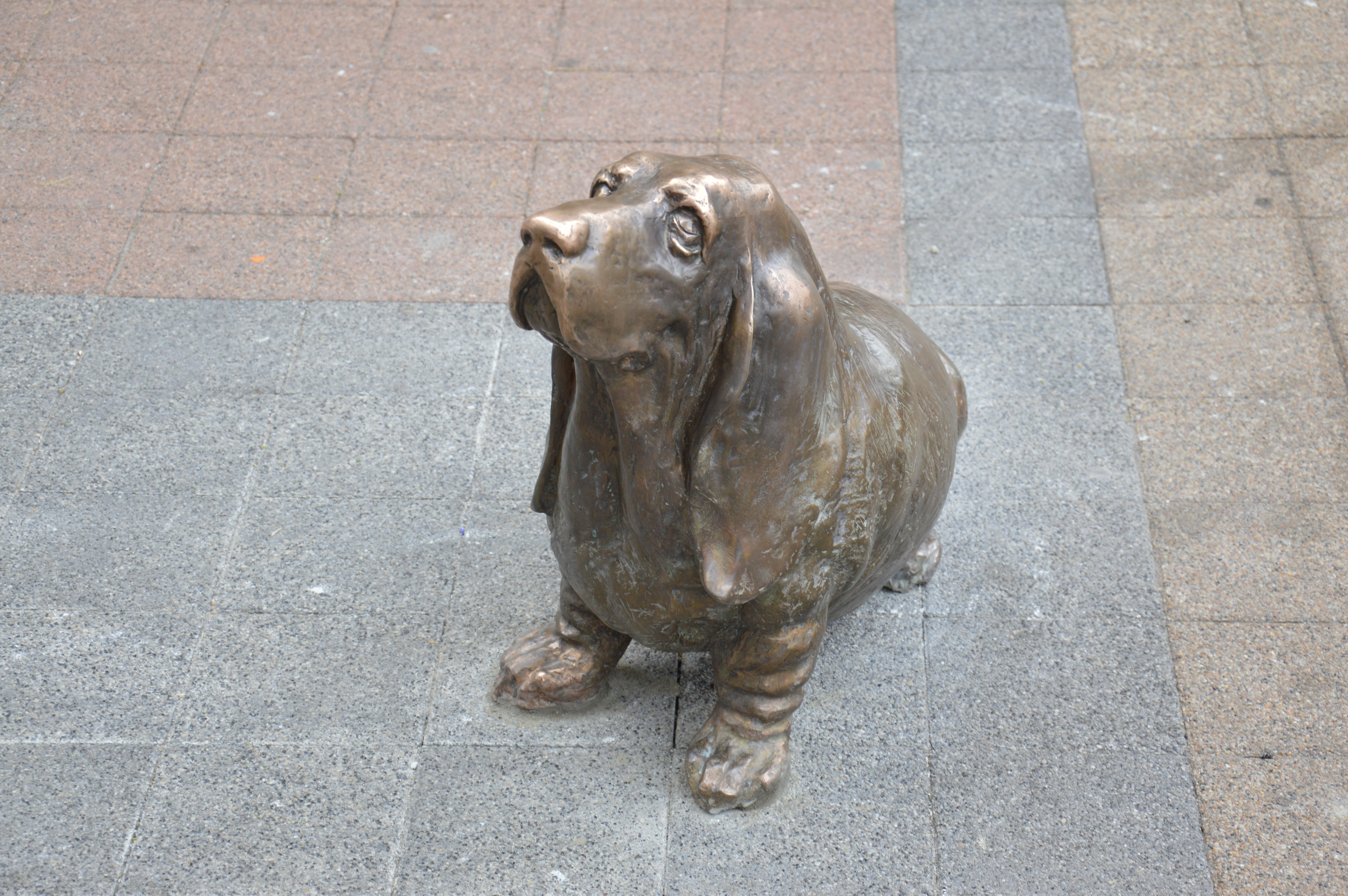

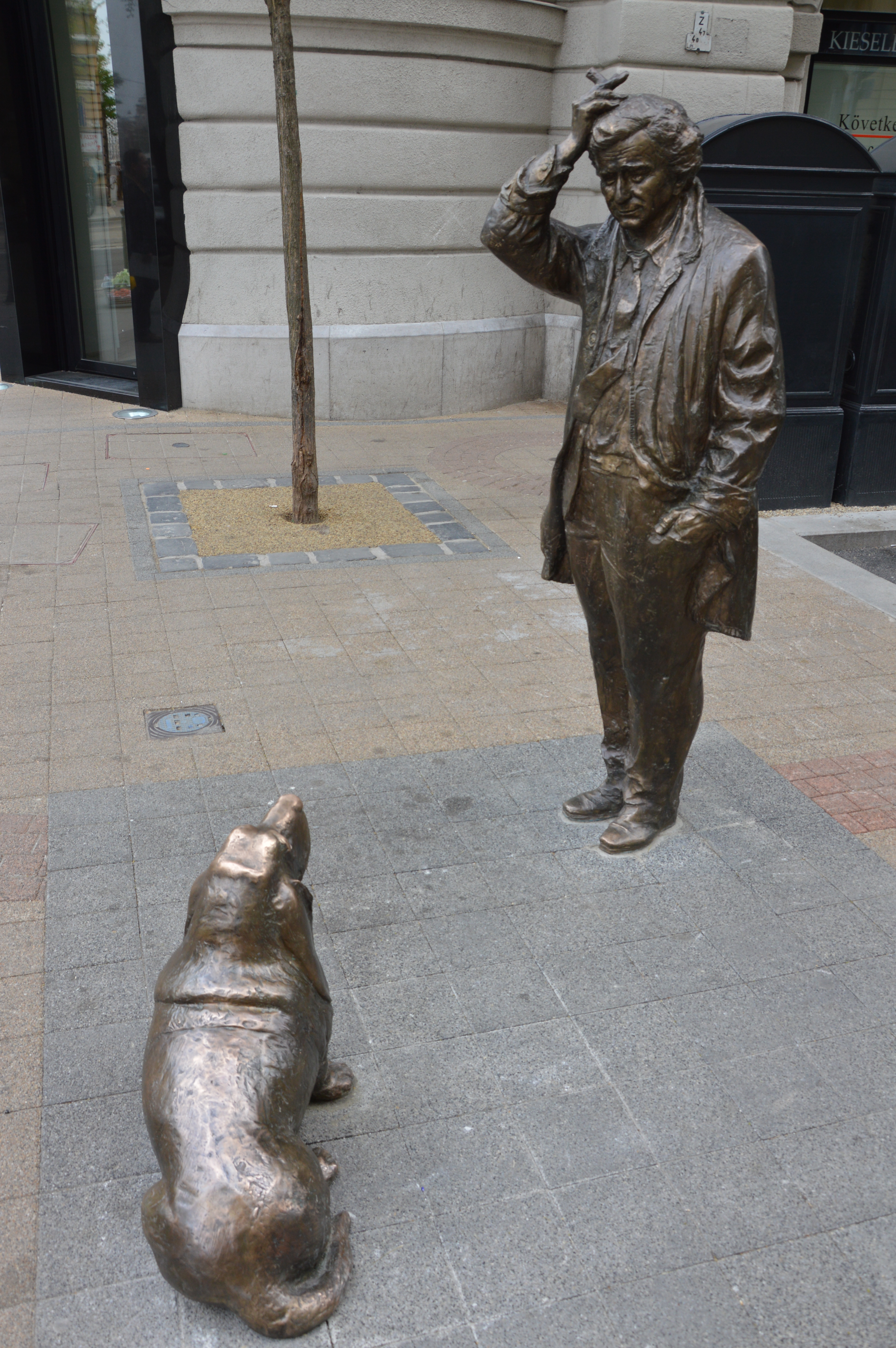

== See also ==
- Columbo, television series
