= Bert Freed =

American actor (1919-1994)

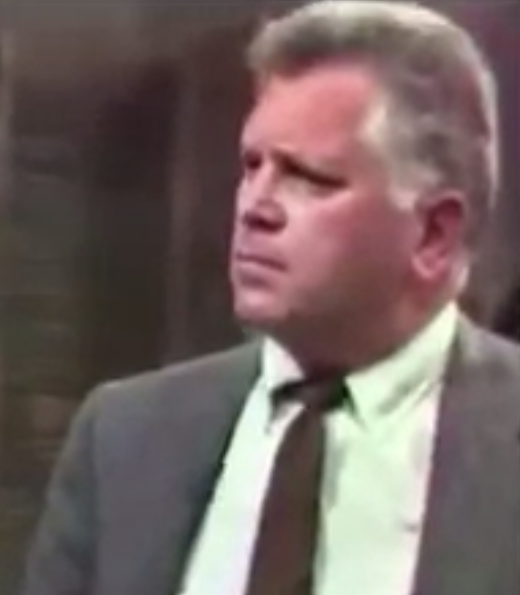
- Bert Freed portraying Columbo in The Chevy Mystery Show (1960)
- Born: November 3, 1919; The Bronx, New York, U.S.
- Died: August 2, 1994 (aged 74); Sechelt, British Columbia, Canada
- Years active: 1942-1986
- Spouse: Nancy Lee (1956–1994) (his death) (2 children)
- Children: Jennifer, Carl, Andrew Sutton (stepson)

Bert Freed (November 3, 1919 – August 2, 1994) was an American actor. He is perhaps best known as the first actor to portray Lt. Columbo.

== Life and career ==
Born and raised in The Bronx, New York, Freed began acting while attending Pennsylvania State University, and made his Broadway debut in 1942. Following World War II Army service in the European theatre, he appeared in the Broadway musical The Day Before Spring in 1945 and dozens of television shows between 1947 and 1985. His film debut occurred, oddly enough, in the musical Carnegie Hall (1947).

Freed portrayed Rufe Ryker in the television series Shane, in which Freed added a unique touch of realism by beginning the show clean-shaven and growing a beard from one week to the next, never shaving again through the season.

Freed played homicide detective Lt. Columbo in a live 1960 television episode of The Chevy Mystery Show, seven years before Peter Falk played the role.

Freed made four guest appearances on Perry Mason, including the role of Ken Woodman in the 1960 episode, "The Case of the Treacherous Toupee"; murder victim Joe Marshall in the 1964 episode, "The Case of the Ruinous Road"; and Carl Holman, whose wife is the murderer in the 1962 episode "The Case of the Poison Pen-Pal".

He appeared in many other television shows such as The Rifleman, Laramie, Bonanza, The High Chaparral, Gunsmoke, The Big Valley, The Virginian, Mannix, Barnaby Jones, Charlie's Angels, Then Came Bronson, Run For Your Life, Get Smart, The Lucy Show, Hogan's Heroes, Steve Canyon, Voyage to the Bottom of the Sea, Dr. Kildare, Ben Casey, Combat!, Petticoat Junction, The Outer Limits, Alfred Hitchcock Presents, Route 66, Ironside, The Green Hornet, The Munsters, The Untouchables, and many others. He directed one episode of T.H.E. Cat.

Freed appeared as a racist club owner in No Way Out (1950), Private Slattery in Halls of Montezuma (1951), the Police Chief in Invaders From Mars (1953), Sergeant Boulanger in Paths of Glory (1957), the hangman in Hang 'Em High (1968), Max's father in Wild in the Streets (1968), as Chief of Detectives in Madigan (1968), a homosexual prison guard in There Was a Crooked Man... (1970) and Bernard's father in Billy Jack (1971).

== Later years and death ==
Freed retired from acting in 1986. He died of a heart attack in Sechelt, British Columbia, in 1994 while on a fishing trip with his son.

== Selected filmography ==
- Boomerang (1947) as Herron, Man in Alley Mob (uncredited)
- Carnegie Hall (1947) as Moving Man (uncredited)
- Twelve O'Clock High (1949) as Officer Standing at Bar (uncredited)
- Key to the City (1950) as Emmy's Husband
- Black Hand (1950) as Prosecutor
- Ma and Pa Kettle Go to Town (1950) as Dutch, 3rd New York Henchman
- Where the Sidewalk Ends (1950) as Detective Paul Klein
- 711 Ocean Drive (1950) as Steve Marshak (uncredited)
- No Way Out (1950) as Rocky Miller (uncredited)
- Halls of Montezuma (1951) as Slattery
- The Company She Keeps (1951) as Smitty
- Detective Story (1951) as Detective Dakis
- Red Mountain (1951) as Sergeant Randall
- Anything Can Happen (1952) as Immigration Officer (uncredited)
- The Atomic City (1952) as Emil Jablons
- The Snows of Kilimanjaro (1952) as American Soldier (uncredited)
- Tangier Incident (1953) as Kozad
- Invaders From Mars (1953) as Police Chief A.C. Barrows (uncredited)
- Take the High Ground! (1953) as Sergeant Vince Opperman
- The Long, Long Trailer (1953) as Foreman
- Men of the Fighting Lady (1954) as Lieutenant (junior grade) Andrew Szymanski
- The Cobweb (1955) as Abe Irwin
- The Desperate Hours (1955) as Tom Winston
- Paths of Glory (1957) as Staff Sergeant Boulanger
- The Goddess (1958) as Lester Brackman
- The Gazebo (1959) as Lieutenant Joe Jenkins
- Steve Canyon (1959) as Captain Dunn
- Alfred Hitchcock Presents (1960) (Season 5 Episode 19: "Not the Running Type") as Captain Harvey Ellison
- Why Must I Die? (1960) as Adler
- The Chevy Mystery Show (1960) (Episode: "Enough Rope") as Lieutenant Columbo
- The Subterraneans (1960) as Bartender
- Alfred Hitchcock Presents (1961) (Season 6 Episode 21: "The Kiss-Off") as Detective Cooper
- What Ever Happened to Baby Jane? (1962) as Ben Golden
- Twilight of Honor (1963) as Sheriff B.L. "Buck" Wheeler
- Shock Treatment (1964) as Frank Josephson
- Invitation to a Gunfighter (1964) as Sheriff
- Fate Is the Hunter (1964) as Dillon
- Nevada Smith (1966) as Quince
- The Swinger (1966) as Police Captain
- Sail to Glory (1967) as Horace Greeley
- Madigan (1968) as Chief of Detectives Hap Lynch
- Wild in the Streets (1968) as Max Jacob Flatow Sr.
- Hang 'Em High (1968) as Schmidt, the Hangman
- There Was a Crooked Man... (1970) as Skinner
- Billy Jack (1971) as Mr. Stuart Posner
- Evel Knievel (1971) as Doc Kincaid
- Mission: Impossible (1972) (Episode: "Committed") as Leon Chandler
- Death Scream (1975) as Detective Ross
- In the Matter of Karen Ann Quinlan (1977) as Dr. Julius Korein
- Love and the Midnight Auto Supply (1977) as Mayor John Randolph
- Till Death (1978) as Dr. Sawyer
- Barracuda (1978) as Papa Jack
- Norma Rae (1979) as Sam Dakin
