= The Chevy Mystery Show =

- Also known as: Sunday Mystery Hour
- Genre: Anthology, mystery
- Directed by: Marc Daniels; Paul Nickell; Richard Dunlap; Walter Grauman; Don Richardson
- Starring: Walter Slezak; Vincent Price
- Country of origin: United States
- Original language: English
- No. of seasons: 1
- No. of episodes: 18

Production
- Producers: Himan Brown; Henry Jaffe
- Production companies: Sewanee Productions, in association with NBC

Original release
- Network: NBC
- Release: May 29 – September 25, 1960

Related
- Columbo

The Chevy Mystery Show, aka Sunday Mystery Hour, is an American television anthology series. It was produced by the National Broadcasting Company (NBC) and Dinah Shore's production company Sewanee.

The program was broadcast on NBC from May 1960 to September 1960 as a summer replacement for The Dinah Shore Chevy Show with Walter Slezak as host, except for the last three episodes, which had Vincent Price as host. The episodes with Slezak as host were re-run with the title Sunday Mystery Hour from July 1961 to September 1961 (sustained by various "participating" advertisers).

There were a total of 18 episodes. Featured actors included Robert Culp, Dane Clark, Agnes Moorehead, Richard Carlson, Janet Blair, and James Whitmore. A 1960 episode, "Enough Rope", was the first appearance of the fictional character Columbo, who would go on to star in his own long-running show.

== Episodes ==
No.	Title	Directed by	Written by	Original release date
1	"The Machine Calls It Murder"	Marc Daniels	Harold Swanton	May 29, 1960
This episode was a remake of "Mechanical Manhunt," which aired as a presentation of The Alcoa Hour on 28 April 1957. Screenwriter Swanton won an Edgar Award from the Mystery Writers of America for Best Mystery Teleplay after that original performance.
2	"Thunder of Silence"	Paul Nickell	Adrian Spies	June 5, 1960
3	"The Summer Hero"	Marc Daniels, Walter Grauman	Charlotte Armstrong	June 12, 1960
4	"Dark Possession"	Unknown	Gore Vidal	June 19, 1960
5	"Fear Is the Parent"	Marc Daniels	Theodore Ferro	June 26, 1960
Based on a novel by Mathilde Ferro
6	"Murder Me Nicely"	Paul Nickell	Mann Rubin	July 3, 1960
7	"Dead Man's Walk"	Unknown	Stephen Kandel	July 10, 1960
8	"The Last Six Blocks"	Unknown	Adrian Spies	July 17, 1960
9	"I Know What I'd Have Done"	Marc Daniels	Charles Larson	July 24, 1960
10	"Enough Rope"	Don Richardson	Richard Levinson, William Link	July 31, 1960
This episode was later made into the TV-movie Prescription: Murder, which became the pilot for Columbo.
11	"Trial by Fury"	Marc Daniels	Stephen Kandel	August 7, 1960
12	"Run-Around"	Paul Nickell	Norman Lessing	August 14, 1960
From a story by A.E. Hotchner
13	"The Inspector Vanishes"	Unknown	Unknown	August 21, 1960
14	"Femme Fatale"	Paul Nickell	John McGreevey	August 28, 1960
15	"Murder by the Book"	Lawrence Gordon Clark	Stephen Kandel	September 4, 1960
16	"Blind Man's Bluff"	Walter Grauman	Alan A. Armer, Walter Grauman	September 11, 1960
17	"The Suicide Club"	Richard Dunlap	Norman Lessing	September 18, 1960
From a story by Robert Louis Stevenson
18	"The Perfect Alibi"	Richard Dunlap	Norman Lessing	September 25, 1960
From a story by A.A. Milne
