= James R. Langham =

American novelist

James R. Langham (1912–1999) was an American crime writer of the early 20th century. He was primarily known for a pair of darkly humorous novels published by Simon & Schuster -- Sing a Song of Homicide (1940) and A Pocketful of Clues (1941) -- written in rapid succession in Langham's late twenties, after which Langham stopped writing and disappeared entirely from the public eye for almost sixty years until his death in 1999.

Both novels featured the crime-solving duo of Ethel and Sammy Abbott, a couple some found reminiscent of Nick and Nora Charles from Dashiell Hammett's The Thin Man series. Sammy was a special agent working for the district attorney of Santa Monica, California, where the series was set. Ethel was his wife. Sing a Song of Homicide was (very loosely) adapted for the screen by Jonathan Latimer as the 1942 feature film Night in New Orleans.

Even as his books were being published, Langham always said that he did not think of himself as a writer. At the time of his first book's publication, he'd been working as a professional singer. And he claimed that throughout his twenties he'd worked as a civil engineer, carpenter, salesman, gunsmith, and census taker, in addition to singing. After A Pocketful of Clues, Langham quit writing altogether.
