= Jonathan Latimer =

American novelist (1906–1983)

- Born: October 23, 1906; Chicago, Illinois, U.S.
- Died: June 23, 1983 (aged 76); La Jolla, California, U.S.
- Education: Knox College
- Occupations: Author; journalist; screenwriter

Jonathan Wyatt Latimer (October 23, 1906 – June 23, 1983) was an American crime writer known his novels and screenplays. Before becoming an author, Latimer was a journalist in Chicago.

== Early life and education ==
Born in Chicago, Illinois, Latimer attended Mesa Ranch School in Mesa, Arizona. He then studied at Knox College in Galesburg, Illinois, where he graduated Phi Beta Kappa in 1929.

During World War II, Latimer served in the United States Navy. After the war, he moved to California and continued his work as a Hollywood screenwriter, including 10 films in collaboration with director John Farrow.

== Career ==
Latimer became a journalist at the Chicago Herald Examiner and later for the Chicago Tribune, writing about crime and meeting Al Capone and Bugs Moran, among others. In the mid-1930s, he turned to writing fiction, starting with a series of novels featuring private eye William Crane, in which he introduced his typical blend of hardboiled crime fiction and elements of screwball comedy.

== Death ==
Latimer died of lung cancer in La Jolla, California on June 23, 1983, aged 76.

== Select bibliography ==
=== The William Crane series ===
- Murder in the Madhouse (1935)
- Headed for a Hearse (1935) filmed 1937 as The Westland Case; Preston Foster as Crane
- The Lady in the Morgue (1936) filmed 1938 (a.k.a. The Case of the Missing Blonde in the UK); Preston Foster as Crane
- The Dead Don't Care (1938) filmed 1938 as The Last Warning; Preston Foster as Crane
- Red Gardenias (1939)

=== Non-series novels ===
- The Search for My Great Uncle's Head (1937) (as Peter Coffin)
- Solomon's Vineyard (1941 (UK)) (published in paperback in 1951, first unexpurgated US edition 1988, and republished in 2014 under the title The Fifth Grave)
- Sinners and Shrouds (1955)
- Black Is the Fashion for Dying (1959)

=== Non-crime novels ===
- Dark Memory (1940)

=== Short stories ===
- A Joke's a Joke (1938)

==== Screenplays ====
- The Lone Wolf Spy Hunt (1939) (based on a novel by Louis Joseph Vance)
- Topper Returns (1941) (original screenplay)
- The Glass Key (1942) (based on the Dashiell Hammett novel)
- Night in New Orleans (1942) (based on a novel by James R. Langham)
- Nocturne (1946)
- They Won't Believe Me (1947) (based on a story by Gordon McDonell)
- Sealed Verdict (1948)
- The Big Clock (1948) (based on the Kenneth Fearing novel)
- Night Has a Thousand Eyes (1948) (based on the Cornell Woolrich novel)
- Beyond Glory (1948)
- Alias Nick Beal (1949) (with Mindret Lord)
- Copper Canyon (1950)
- Submarine Command (1951), screenplay from his own story, starring William Holden
- The Redhead and the Cowboy (1951)
- Botany Bay (1952)
- Plunder of the Sun (1953) (based on the David F. Dodge novel)
- Back from Eternity (1956)
- The Unholy Wife (1957) (co-authored with William Durkee)
- The Strange Case of the Cosmic Rays (1957) (with Frank Capra)
- The Unchained Goddess (1958) (with Frank Capra)
- The Whole Truth (1958)
- 32 episodes of the Perry Mason television series
- The Greenhouse Jungle (from the second season of the Columbo television series, 1972)

==== Other Films Based on Stories by Latimer ====
- Phantom Raiders 1940, 2nd in a series of Nick Carter movies starring Walter Pidgeon

== See also ==
- Hard boiled American crime fiction for a discussion of Solomon's Vineyard, the publication of which was suppressed in the United States for a long time.
