= Miksa Falk =

Hungarian politician (1828–1908)

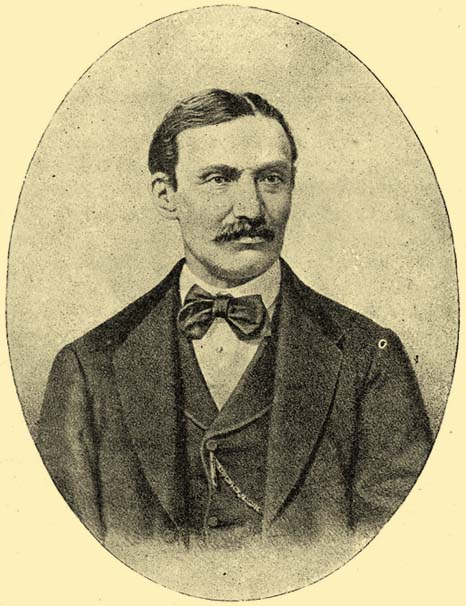
- Born: 7 October 1828; Pest, Kingdom of Hungary, Austrian Empire
- Died: 10 September 1908 (aged 79); Budapest, Austria-Hungary
- Occupations: Politician, journalist, editor

Miksa Falk (or sometimes Maximilian Falk, 7 October 1828 – 10 September 1908) was a Hungarian politician, journalist, member of the Hungarian Academy of Sciences and the editor-in-chief of the German-language newspaper Pester Lloyd.

== Early life ==
Falk was born to an impoverished Hungarian-Jewish merchant family in Pest, which was a separate town (on the east bank of the river Danube) that was later united with the towns of Buda and Óbuda (on the west bank of the river Danube) in 1873 to form Budapest, the capital of Hungary. At the age of 15, he already wrote articles for German-speaking newspapers in Pest. He studied at the Faculty of Arts in Vienna. He returned to Pest in 1848, but soon he went back to Vienna. From 1867 he lived in Hungary.

Hungarian urban legend states that Miksa Falk was a distant relative of the American actor Peter Falk, but there is no known evidence of their relation. A statue of Peter Falk is located on Miksa Falk Street in Budapest.

== Works ==
Initially, Falk worked for the magazine Ungar (Hungarian), then he moved to Vienna. He started to write articles at the newspaper Oesterreichische Zeitung, but when the newspaper was banned, he went to work for the newspaper Wanderer. In Hungary, he had articles in Pesti Napló, where he criticized absolutism. At the same time, he wrote supporter conservative articles anonymously for the Budapesti Hírlap. After the Austro-Hungarian Compromise of 1867, he returned to Hungary for good and became the editor-in-chief of the German-language newspaper Pester Lloyd, and also worked for the Politikai Hetilap (Political Weekly Newspaper). He taught the Hungarian language to Austrian-Hungarian Empress Elisabeth of Bavaria.

== Political life ==
Between 1850 and 1860, he joined the circle of István Széchenyi, who at that time lived in Döbling, Austria. He supported the Compromise of 1867 with his articles. From 1875, he became the representative of the Liberal Party founded by Ferenc Deák. He was representative of cities Kőszeg, Arad and Keszthely in several periods. The party collapsed in 1905 and Miksa Falk retired.
