= Howard Berk =

American screenwriter

Howard Berk (c. 1925 - March 27, 2016) was an American novelist, screenwriter, and producer.

== Early life ==
Berk was born circa 1925. He graduated from the University of Georgia, having studied journalism.

== Career ==
Berk worked as a reporter for The Havana Herald in Cuba in the 1950s. He also worked for the Associated Press. He taught at his alma mater, the University of Georgia, and authored four novels.

Berk wrote several episodes of television series Columbo, Mission: Impossible, and McMillan & Wife. He also wrote films including the 1985 movie Target, starring Gene Hackman and directed by Arthur Penn.

== Death ==
Berk died on March 27, 2016, in Los Angeles, California.
