= Columbo season 10 =

Season of television series (all episodes of 1990 to 2003)

Columbo
- Season 10
- No. of episodes: 14

Release
- Original network: ABC
- Original release: December 9, 1990 – January 30, 2003

Season chronology
- ← Previous; Season 9

The final 14 episodes of Columbo were produced sporadically as a series of specials, spanning 13 years from 1990 to 2003. These episodes have since been released on DVD in several regions as "season 10". Two of the episodes, "No Time to Die" and "Undercover", were based on 87th Precinct novels by Ed McBain and thus do not follow the usual Columbo format.

== Episodes ==
No. overall	No. in season	Title	Directed by	Written by	Murderer played by	Victim(s) played by	Original release date	Runtime
56	1	"Columbo Goes to College"	E.W. Swackhamer	Story by : Jeffrey Bloom and Frederick King Keller; Teleplay by : Jeffrey Bloom	Stephen Caffrey as Justin Rowe and Gary Hershberger as Cooper Redman	James Sutorius as D.E. Rusk	December 9, 1990	89 min
Criminology professor D.E. Rusk threatens to expel spoiled fraternity brothers Justin Rowe (Stephen Caffrey) and Cooper Redman (Gary Hershberger) for cheating by stealing the final exam. In a variation of Leopold and Loeb, the two students decide to kill Rusk. They fake a message to lure him away from the university just when Columbo will be giving a guest lecture to his class. While sitting at the lecture, they monitor the parking garage using a miniature TV camera and shoot Rusk by his car with a remote-controlled gun, both devices being hidden in their pickup truck's engine compartment. With an airtight alibi, the boys then plant evidence to make it look like the professor was killed because of a Mafia exposé he was working on. Final clue/twist: Columbo tricks the murderous duo by letting them "overhear" details of a car owned by a suspect. Rowe and Redman plant the murder weapon in that vehicle, but after it is found, Columbo reveals it is actually his wife's car. Because only the two students could know which car it was, they implicated themselves as the only ones who could have planted it, and in so doing, as the murderers as well. Robert Culp returns to the series, playing Justin's powerful lawyer father. This is the only time, in his four appearances, that Culp did not play the killer.
57	2	"Caution: Murder Can Be Hazardous to Your Health"	Daryl Duke	Sonia Wolf & Patricia Ford & April Raynell	George Hamilton as Wade Anders	Peter Haskell as Budd Clarke	February 20, 1991	86 min
Wade Anders (George Hamilton) is a former security consultant, and now host of the popular America's Most Wanted-esque crime show CrimeAlert. One day, he gets an unexpected visit from his rival, the chain-smoking newscaster Budd Clarke (Peter Haskell), whom he blocked from becoming the CrimeAlert host. Clarke has resented that he was snubbed in favor of Anders, but now, he has got some leverage that he hopes will get Anders out of the CrimeAlert chair: a porn video that Anders starred in many years ago. Clarke plans to go public with the tape unless Anders resigns from the show. Anders decides to kill him rather than be disgraced by a scandal. He palms a pack of Clarke's cigarettes, which he doctors with a few drops of alkaloid poison nicotine sulfate. Anders then pays two visits to his production office, once that night and again the next morning - so a surveillance tape there will show him at the office all day. Anders then drives to Clarke's house, and switches a cigarette pack for the poisoned pack. Once Clarke takes one of the poisoned cigarettes and dies, Anders makes it look like Clarke had a heart attack at his desk. Final clue/twist: Columbo can prove that the surveillance tape was fabricated, because the trees and bushes visible in front of the office appeared to have been trimmed in the morning, but had supposedly grown again by the evening. The fact that Clarke's dog scratched Anders's car, making distinctive marks because of its missing claw on one of its paws, provides further evidence that Anders had indeed visited Clarke's house before.
58	3	"Columbo and the Murder of a Rock Star"	Alan J. Levi	William Read Woodfield	Dabney Coleman as Hugh Creighton	Cheryl Paris as Marcy Edwards	April 29, 1991	91 min
Rock star Marcy Edwards (Cheryl Paris) has been the live-in lover of high-priced murder lawyer Hugh Creighton (Dabney Coleman) for several years. He learns that she is having an affair with someone else and throws her out of his house. However, Marcy blackmails Creighton into letting her stay, at least until he comes up with the $5 million she is demanding in exchange for not filing a palimony suit against him or exposing his unconventional practice methods. Creighton's response is to drug the champagne in her beach house and wait until she shows up there with her current lover. Having previously ensured that Marcy cannot drink by lacing her tea with disulfiram, Creighton waits until her new lover is passed out, then strangles her. Her lover awakens and flees the scene. Creighton enlists his associate, Trish Fairbanks (Shera Danese), to help him concoct an airtight alibi, but when she finds out what he has done, she blackmails him into a full partnership in the firm, wisely going the extra mile by creating a contingency plan to ensure that killing her is not an option for Creighton. Columbo cracks the case, despite the existence of a speed-camera ticket which appears to exonerate Creighton completely. Final clue/twist: Due to shadow angles in the picture of the speeding ticket, Columbo can prove that Creighton's face was just a flat cut-out mask and that Fairbanks must have been driving Creighton's speeding vehicle, and breaking his alibi. Also, marks on Edwards neck matched the gloves found in the gardener's truck that had been stolen, parked on a particular street where an unusual type of tree grows, and returned. The windshield wiper wells on Fairbanks's car collected the berries and droppings of these trees, proving that Creighton parked her car on that street and also drove the truck there.
59	4	"Death Hits the Jackpot"	Vincent McEveety	Jeffrey Bloom	Rip Torn as Leon Lamarr and Jamie Rose as Nancy Brower	Gary Kroeger as Freddy Brower	December 15, 1991	92 min
Down-on-his-luck photographer Freddy Brower (Gary Kroeger) wins a $30 million lottery. But he wants to keep the money a secret from his wife Nancy (Jamie Rose), who is divorcing him, so that she cannot make a claim for the money. Freddy goes to his uncle, wealthy jeweler Leon Lamarr (Rip Torn), who offers to pretend that the lottery ticket is his own until Freddy's divorce is finalized. Unfortunately, that is where Freddy's luck runs out: he does not know that Lamarr has recently gone bankrupt, and is also having an affair with Nancy. Lamarr decides to kill Freddy to keep the lottery winnings for himself. He schedules a Halloween costume party at his house, during which he sneaks out to Freddy's apartment, knocks him out, undresses him, then drowns him in his bathtub. Nancy calls Lamarr during the party pretending to be Freddy. Final clue/twist: The night of the murder, Brower was taking care of a friend's chimpanzee. Columbo learns that the chimp liked to handle shiny objects, and finds the chimp's fingerprints on a medallion that was part of Lamarr's Halloween costume, proving that Lamarr was at Brower's apartment that night. When confronting Lamarr, Columbo calls Nancy in to thank her for her "cooperation" and to let her know she will be the sole beneficiary of the winnings. Columbo knew Lamarr would think Nancy has implicated him, so Lamarr not only confesses to the murder, but reveals Nancy's involvement in the crime. Betsy Palmer co-stars as Lamarr's wife.
60	5	"No Time to Die"	Alan J. Levi	Story by : Ed McBain; Teleplay by : Robert Van Scoyk	(No murderer. Daniel McDonald plays the kidnapper Rudy Strassa.)	(No murder. Joanna Going plays the kidnapping victim, and intended murder victim, Melissa Hayes.)	February 15, 1992	87 min
Columbo attends the wedding of his police officer nephew Andy Parma (Thomas Calabro). While Andy is showering, his new bride Melissa Hayes (Joanna Going), a fashion model, is abducted from the bridal suite. Andy enlists Columbo's help in catching the kidnapper. Melissa has been kidnapped by Rudy Strassa (Daniel McDonald), a sadistic psychopath who intends to kill her once he consummates "their marriage". This episode is based on the 87th Precinct novel So Long As You Both Shall Live by Ed McBain, although not credited as such. This is the only episode in which no murder occurs and in which Columbo does not meet the criminal. Aired under ABC Sunday Night Movie.
61	6	"A Bird in the Hand..."	Vincent McEveety	Jackson Gillis	Tyne Daly as Dolores McCain and Greg Evigan as Harold McCain	Steve Forrest as Fred McCain, León Singer as Fernando and Greg Evigan as Harold McCain	November 22, 1992	89 min
Given a deadline to pay his debts, or else, chronic gambler Harold McCain (Greg Evigan) plants a bomb under the car of his uncle, professional football team owner Big Fred (Steve Forrest). The bomb is set to explode when the engine is started. The next day, Big Fred is killed - not by the bomb but being run over with the gardener's pickup truck while he is jogging. Harold tries to remove the bomb before it kills someone else, but cannot get near the car due to police and security on the premises. When the gardener tries to move the car out of the way of the TV camera crews, the bomb explodes, killing him. Columbo investigates and discovers clues that link Harold to the car bomb, but Harold denies any involvement and tries to divert suspicion away from himself. Fred's wife Dolores (Tyne Daly) appears traumatised at losing her husband, yet, has a good time as Fred's team's owner and also flirts with Harold. He tries to squeeze her for money. The next day he is found shot dead in his cabin. Final clue/twist: The TV news tape shows Harold closing his eyes before the car exploded, thus proving that he knew there was a bomb under the car. Columbo discovers that Harold's alarm was set to 8 pm, not 8 am. Harold had spent the entire night at a casino, where he won $5,000 and had breakfast; then he had a haircut and went to Dolores's house, which Columbo proves with recently cut hairs found inside Harold's hat that was in Dolores's den. Dolores shot Harold and moved his body to his cabin, but left Harold's hat at her house. Before Harold planted the bomb, Dolores moved the car onto the driveway so the gardener could not drive his truck in. Dolores then sent the gardener to the back of house so that he would not see her steal his truck and run Big Fred over. Harold suspected Dolores was involved and was implying blackmail when he asked her for money. When Dolores demands that Columbo prove it, he replies, "I don't have to prove it, ma'am. One in the hand is better than two in the bush," and arrests her for Harold's murder. Like "Last Salute to the Commodore" many years earlier, the real killer is not revealed until nearly the end of the episode. In both episodes, murders occur off screen, and both were scripted by Columbo veteran Jackson Gillis (this was his final contribution to the series). The episode used footage of a Saskatchewan Roughriders vs Edmonton Eskimos CFL game to represent fictional American football teams with the same initials, the Stallions and the Elks. Coincidentally, in 2021 the real-life Eskimos changed their name and became the Elks. This is one of four episodes (the other three being "Undercover", "Last Salute to the Commodore", and "The Most Dangerous Match") in which Columbo is present at the death of a victim.
62	7	"It's All in the Game"	Vincent McEveety	Peter Falk	Faye Dunaway as Lauren Staton and Claudia Christian as Lisa Martin	Armando Pucci as Nick Franco	October 31, 1993	91 min
Wealthy socialites Lauren Staton (Faye Dunaway) and Lisa Martin (Claudia Christian) conspire to murder their abusive, two-timing lover Nick Franco (Armando Pucci). Lisa lures Nick into his apartment, but Lauren commits the actual murder by shooting him and then fleeing. Lisa stays behind in the apartment, keeping the body warm for several hours with an electric blanket until Lauren returns to the complex and begins talking with the building manager (Bill Macy). While they're in the hallway, Lisa fires a shot into the air, then flees through the patio in disguise, making it seem like the murder happened right then. During the whole investigation, Lauren takes all the heat from Columbo to protect Lisa, even going so far as to romance him. Final clue/twist: When Columbo discovers that Lisa was the only person Nick had talked to by phone in the ten days prior to his death, Columbo searches her apartment and comes across a photograph of her posing next to a one-of-a-kind antique chair similar to the one that Lauren had posed with in another photograph he had also seen. Upon comparing the two photos side-by-side, he concludes that it was the same chair, and same location, in both photos, indicating to him that Lisa and Lauren might actually know each other. He brings Lisa in for questioning and has Lauren watch behind a one-way mirror. As it turns out, Lisa is Lauren's daughter, and when Lauren sees Lisa being loudly interrogated by Columbo's associates, Lauren breaks down and offers to confess on the condition that Columbo let Lisa go. Lauren admits to the murder, but refuses to name Lisa as her accomplice. When Columbo learns that Lauren's motive was to avenge Nick's cheating as well as his physically attacking Lisa with a razor, Columbo rips up the photo evidence implicating Lisa, deciding not to charge the daughter as she heads back to Rome. Dunaway won an Emmy for Outstanding Guest Actress in a Drama Series for her performance. This is the only episode written by Peter Falk. Aired under ABC Sunday Night Movie.
63	8	"Butterfly in Shades of Grey"	Dennis Dugan	Peter S. Fischer	William Shatner as Fielding Chase	Jack Laufer as Gerry Winters	January 10, 1994	88 min
Domineering radio host Fielding Chase (William Shatner) faces a crisis when his ward, 25-year-old Victoria Chase (Molly Hagan), decides to spread her wings and leave for New York. Chase is a national celebrity thanks to his call-in radio show and while Victoria works as his producer, his affection for her runs deep. An ex-employee, the homosexual Gerry Winters (Jack Laufer), has been encouraging Victoria and has even found a literary agent for her book. Chase decides to kill Winters. He first instructs Winters to call him at a certain time. Exactly at that appointed hour, Chase drives to Winters's house and sneaks inside. Winters makes the phone call, unaware that Chase is actually behind him in the same room. Once the phone goes to Chase's answering machine, Chase picks up an extension in another room of Winters's house and begins speaking with him. At that point, Chase enters the next room and shoots Winters, then makes it look like Winters was shot by a gay lover. Final clue/twist: A cell phone is a key to Columbo's solution of the crime. Chase claimed that after hearing the murder on his phone at his mountain home, he started to drive to Winters's house, then quickly realized he should call 911 and used his cell phone. But, Columbo realizes, there is no cell coverage on the part of the mountain road near Chase's house, where his car would have been. After three unconventional episodes, Butterfly in Shades of Grey marked a return to the standard Columbo style.
64	9	"Undercover"	Vincent McEveety	Story by : Ed McBain; Teleplay by : Gerry Day	Ed Begley Jr. as Irving Krutch	Burt Young as Mo Weinberg and Shera Danese as Geraldine Ferguson	May 2, 1994	89 min
Irving Krutch (Ed Begley Jr.), an insurance investigator, enlists the help of Columbo to solve a series of murders that starts when two men, each of whom possesses a piece of a photograph, kill each other in a burglary gone wrong. Some years back a group of four men robbed a bank, but all of them were killed by the police in a shootout after they were caught in a car accident. But before they died, they hid their loot somewhere which can only be found through the assembled photograph. Columbo must go undercover to recover some of the pieces, solve some murders to get some others, and all the while trying to figure out what Krutch might be after. Burt Young has a cameo as a small time hood. Final clue/twist: Krutch's fingerprint can be found on a coin inserted on Saturday afternoon into a parking meter in the front of the house where Weinberg was killed. This breaks his alibi. This episode is based upon the 87th Precinct novel Jigsaw by Ed McBain, although not credited as such. This installment thus departs from the usual format by not revealing the culprit until the end of the show. Unlike the previous episode based on McBain source material, No Time To Die, this features a regular character from the 87th Precinct series, Arthur Brown, played by Harrison Page.
65	10	"Strange Bedfellows"	Vincent McEveety	Lawrence Vail	George Wendt as Graham McVeigh	Jeff Yagher as Teddy McVeigh and Jay Acovone as Bruno Romano	May 8, 1995	89 min
Graham McVeigh (George Wendt) is a thoroughbred ranch owner, and he is tired of his brother Teddy being in constant debt to mob bookie and restaurateur Bruno Romano. He decides to kill Teddy and frame Romano for the crime. To do so, Graham makes Teddy take a big loss at the race track by drugging his own horse so that it loses, leaving Teddy in deeper debt to Romano. Graham then disguises himself and goes to Romano's restaurant, where he distracts Romano by setting mice loose in a bathroom and calls Teddy from a restaurant phone so that the phone records will suggest Romano called Teddy. Graham and Teddy then drive out to a secluded area, where Graham shoots Teddy, then rides home on a folding bike he stashed in the trunk. The next day, Graham invites Romano to come out to the ranch, ostensibly to pay Teddy's debt. When Romano looks at a briefcase containing the money, Graham shoots him, switches Romano's revolver for the identical murder gun, and makes it look like self-defense. Romano's boss Vincenzo Fortelli (Rod Steiger) becomes involved, exerting pressure on McVeigh. To solve the crime before Fortelli takes matters into his own hands, Columbo must work with the gangster. Final clue/twist: Columbo invites McVeigh to dinner at Romano's restaurant. McVeigh accepts the invitation, but Columbo does not turn up. After the last dinner guests leave, it dawns on McVeigh that it is a set-up and that Fortelli and his men are planning an ambush. Fearing for his life, McVeigh contacts Columbo who says that he never invited him to the restaurant but quickly makes his way there. After Columbo arrives, Fortelli threatens to kill McVeigh unless he confesses to murdering Teddy. McVeigh denies it at first, but fearing for his life even more, he eventually gives in, confesses to the murders and reveals where he hid Romano's actual gun. After McVeigh is arrested, Columbo reveals that the whole confrontation was staged to get McVeigh to confess.
66	11	"A Trace of Murder"	Vincent McEveety	Charles Kipps	David Rasche as Patrick Kinsley and Shera Danese as Cathleen Calvert	Raye Birk as Howard Seltzer	May 15, 1997	88 min
Cathleen Calvert (Falk's wife Shera Danese, in her sixth and final appearance) and her lover, crime scene investigator Patrick Kinsley (David Rasche), are weary of having to see each other on the sly. She will not divorce her husband, rich businessman Clifford Calvert (Barry Corbin), due to their prenuptial agreement. So the lovers scheme to get him out of the way by killing Howard Seltzer (Raye Birk), an investment broker who is suing him, then framing Clifford for the murder. To do so, Patrick drives to Seltzer's house and tricks Seltzer into letting him inside by claiming that his car phone has died and that he has to make an urgent phone call. Patrick then shoots Seltzer and plants evidence to suggest that Clifford was responsible. Columbo's work is cut out for him, because Patrick is on the team handling the investigation. In this episode it is implied that Columbo only has one eye, as does Peter Falk. Final clue/twist: At a restaurant, Columbo sees Kingsley move artificial sweetener towards Cathleen Calvert when they all receive coffee. A few minutes later, Columbo sees Kinsley open the front door of a car for Cathleen Calvert instead of the back door. Columbo realizes that despite their claims otherwise, the two know each other. If they had never met, as they claimed to Columbo, Kinsley would not have known that Cathleen prefers the front seat because she easily gets car sick when sitting in the back, or that she takes artificial sweetener with her coffee. A wedding photographer's shot of the Calvert couple dancing also helps reveal that the cat hair found on Clifford's suit jacket was planted by Cathleen, while an earlier photograph shows that Clifford did not have cat hair on his suit jacket prior to dancing with Cathleen. Billed as the "25th Anniversary Movie", it aired as the ABC Thursday Night Movie.
67	12	"Ashes to Ashes"	Patrick McGoohan	Jeffrey Hatcher	Patrick McGoohan as Eric Prince	Rue McClanahan as Verity Chandler	October 8, 1998	86 min
Patrick McGoohan stars in and directs his final appearance, his fourth time playing the murderer. As funeral director to the stars Eric Prince, he murders gossip columnist Verity Chandler (Rue McClanahan) when she attends his latest funeral, that of actor and war hero Chuck Houston. Chandler threatens Prince that her next exposé will be about how 20 years earlier, he stole a valuable diamond from the body of a deceased silent film star. Prince bludgeons Chandler with a tool in his storage room, then hides the body in a compartment used for corpses. After the funeral, Prince takes the casket containing Houston's body to the preparation room, where he puts Chandler's body into the casket in its place. It next enters the cremation oven, and afterwards, the ashes are scattered by helicopter over the Hollywood hills. Prince then goes to Chandler's house and fakes evidence of her abduction. So that no one will become suspicious, he cremates Houston's body by piggybacking him onto another corpse scheduled to be cremated. Final clue/twist: Houston suffered a war injury in which a distinctively-shaped piece of shrapnel remained stuck in his body for the rest of his life. It was made of a strong metal that was not affected by the flames of the cremation process. As Columbo said when confronting Prince, "Perhaps you can explain how a piece of Mr. Houston's 50-year-old war record ended up in the urn of a leisurewear importer." Sally Kellerman plays the dead man's widow, Liz Houston, and Catherine McGoohan, the real-life daughter of Patrick McGoohan, plays Rita, Prince's assistant.
68	13	"Murder with Too Many Notes"	Patrick McGoohan	Story by : Jeffrey Cava; Teleplay by : Jeffrey Cava and Patrick McGoohan	Billy Connolly as Findlay Crawford	Chad Willett as Gabriel McEnery	March 12, 2001	85 min
Hollywood film composer and conductor Findlay Crawford (Billy Connolly) has been mentor to a talented young composer, Gabriel McEnery (Chad Willett), who has been ghostwriting most of Crawford's work for the last few years. Gabe even penned Crawford's last movie score, which won an Oscar. Crawford realizes he will be ruined and ridiculed if it ever becomes known. Aware that Gabe practices on the roof of a studio building, Crawford plots his murder. He promises Gabe will get to conduct the orchestra during a concert based on Crawford's "own" movie scores. While giving a toast, Crawford drugs Gabe, then takes his body up to his rooftop rehearsal place, which happens to be atop a trapdoor to a freight elevator. He makes it look like Gabe was there rehearsing; With the concert about to begin, Crawford starts the freight elevator, then makes it into the concert hall in time to begin conducting before the elevator reaches the top. When the elevator doors open, Gabe's unconscious body is pushed over the side and falls to his death, landing in front of a late-arriving couple. Final clue/twist: Columbo's first clue is that the victim did not cry out as he fell to his death: On the victim’s body, Columbo finds a cut on his hand in which dried blood reveals the presence of secobarbital, explaining why the victim did not scream as he fell to his death; he was unconscious. This explains why his shoes were two sizes too large and why his house key was missing: the victim couldn’t complain because he was unconscious. In Columbo's reconstruction of the Crime clues point to Crawford as the killer. Crawford confirmed just before that McEnery would have heard the elevator that threw him off the roof if he wasn’t unconscious. Aired under Monday Night Movie. Originally produced in 1999, but left unaired until 2001.
69	14	"Columbo Likes the Nightlife"	Jeffrey Reiner	Michael Alaimo	Matthew Rhys as Justin Price and Jennifer Sky as Vanessa Farrow	Carmine Giovinazzo as Tony Galper and Douglas Roberts as Linwood Coben	January 30, 2003	84 min
When Vanessa Farrow (Jennifer Sky) defends herself against an assault by her ex-husband, mobster Tony Galper, she accidentally kills him. Her boyfriend, Los Angeles rave promoter Justin Price (Matthew Rhys), whose new club Galper was backing, helps Vanessa dispose of the body, but the events are secretly photographed by tabloid photographer Linwood Coben, who offers Price the negatives and prints for $250,000. Price agrees to pay, but when they meet, Price strangles him and makes it look like a suicide. Final clue/twist: Columbo points out that one of the koi tanks built into the dance floor at Price's club contains fewer fish and must be less deep than the other tanks. Columbo has ground-penetrating radar used to find Tony's body hidden under the tank. The club scenes use two tracks from the album Tweekend by The Crystal Method. This was the final episode of "Columbo". It aired under ABC Thursday Night at the Movies.
