= Columbo season 6 =

Season of television series

Columbo
- Season 6
- No. of episodes: 3

Release
- Original network: NBC
- Original release: October 10, 1976 – May 22, 1977

Season chronology
- ← Previous; Season 5 Next → Season 7

This is a list of episodes from the sixth season of Columbo.

== Broadcast history ==
The season originally aired Sundays at 8:00–9:30 pm (EST) as part of The NBC Sunday Mystery Movie.

== DVD release ==
The season was released on DVD by Universal Studios Home Entertainment along with season seven, under its Universal Classic Television classic TV entertainment programming series.

== Episodes ==
No. overall	No. in season	Title	Directed by	Written by	Murderer played by	Victim(s) played by	Original release date	Runtime
38	1	"Fade in to Murder"	Bernard L. Kowalski	Story by : Henry Garson; Teleplay by : Peter Feibleman and Lou Shaw	William Shatner as Ward Fowler	Lola Albright as Claire Daley	October 10, 1976	70 min
Egocentric actor Ward Fowler (William Shatner), who portrays Detective Lucerne on a weekly TV show, is being blackmailed by his producer and ex-paramour, Claire Daley (Lola Albright), over the fact that he was a deserter in the Korean War. Fowler drugs a friend staying at his house watching a baseball game, puts it on tape delay, then dons a ski mask and pretends to rob a delicatessen where Claire is shopping. After Fowler knocks the proprietor unconscious and takes Claire's money, he shoots her dead, then ditches the gun and mask. He begins stepping in and out of character to "assist" Columbo with the investigation. Final clue/twist: After Columbo has shaken Fowler's alibi, he confronts him with his biggest mistake. There are no fingerprints on the murder weapon, but Fowler left his fingerprints on the remaining live bullets inside the revolver's chamber. Molly, Mr Daley's secretary, is played by Shera Danese, who would eventually marry star Peter Falk. Walter Koenig guest stars as a police sergeant. The mechanical shark "Bruce" from Jaws makes a cameo as himself.
39	2	"Old Fashioned Murder"	Robert Douglas	Story by : Lawrence Vail; Teleplay by : Peter Feibleman	Joyce Van Patten as Ruth Lytton	Peter Feibleman as Milton Schaeffer and Tim O'Connor as Edward Lytton	November 28, 1976	72 min
The Lytton family owns and operates an antiquities museum. Ruth Lytton (Joyce Van Patten) has dedicated her life to the museum, never marrying and having no children, although her niece Janie (Jeannie Berlin) is as close to her as a daughter. Her brother Edward (Tim O'Connor) is not nearly as dedicated to the family business as Ruth is; in fact, he plans to close the museum and sell the building, as it's been losing money for years. Ruth and Edward's sister (and Janie's mother) Phyllis Brandt (Celeste Holm) is a checked-out alcoholic who is likely to go along with Edward's decision. Ruth enlists Milton Schaeffer (Peter Feibleman), an ex-con who works as a guard at the museum, and whose brother Tim is having an affair with Janie, in a complex plot where Milton will steal some artifacts from the museum, fake his own death, and then flee the country while Ruth collects the insurance money. But her real goal is revealed when she double-crosses Milton during the robbery, and shoots him dead, then kills Edward when he comes to investigate the gunshot. She then plants guns on both men to make it look like they killed each other. When Ruth realizes Columbo has not fallen for the staged robbery, she tries to frame Janie for involvement in the crimes. Final clue/twist: Ruth plants an ancient belt buckle in Janie's room to frame her, and Janie is arrested for the murders. Columbo takes the buckle to Janie's prison cell. When Janie uses it as an ashtray, Columbo knows she has no idea what it is, so she could not possibly have had a hand in its theft. Columbo comes to believe that, many years before, Ruth killed Janie's father, Peter Brandt, whom she was going to marry until Phyllis snatched him away. To protect Janie, who does not know much about her father’s death and his relationships with the women in his life, Ruth persuades Columbo not to pursue those questions and in return she will confess to the two current murders.
40	3	"The Bye-Bye Sky High I.Q. Murder Case"	Sam Wanamaker	Robert Malcolm Young	Theodore Bikel as Oliver Brandt	Sorrell Booke as Bertie Hastings	May 22, 1977	70 min
Bertie Hastings (Sorrell Booke) discovers that his friend, Oliver Brandt (Theodore Bikel), a senior partner in an accounting firm, has been embezzling money to support the expensive lifestyle of his beautiful wife, Vivian (Samantha Eggar). Hastings refuses to remain silent, even though he is friends with the volatile and egotistical Brandt. Brandt then plots Hastings's murder at the Sigma Society, the headquarters of a Mensa-type club for geniuses, intending to make it look like a burglary gone bad. Final clue/twist: Columbo uses Brandt's own Mensa-level intelligence and vanity, along with his dislike of the other people in the society, to trap him. After Columbo presents a ridiculous solution to how the murder took place, specifically on how the murderer timed things so the sounds of gunshots were heard coming from upstairs, immediately followed by the sound of a falling body, an outraged and insulted Brandt shows him exactly how it was done. Jamie Lee Curtis has a small role as a surly coffee-shop waitress in just her 3rd TV appearance. This was the last episode to air under the NBC Mystery Movie brand before it was cancelled.
