= Primetime Emmy Award for Outstanding Directing for a Limited or Anthology Series or Movie =

- Awarded for: Outstanding Directing for a Limited or Anthology Series or Movie
- Country: United States
- Presented by: Academy of Television Arts & Sciences
- First award: 1975
- Currently held by: Steven Conrad, DTF St. Louis (2026)
- Website: emmys.com

This is a list of the winners and nominees of the Primetime Emmy Award for Outstanding Directing for a Limited or Anthology Series or Movie.

== Chronology of category names ==
Over the years, the scope of this award has evolved and the name with which it has been presented reflects those changes:

- 1975: Director of the Year – Special
- 1976: Outstanding Directing in a Special Program – Drama or Comedy
- 1977: Outstanding Directing in a Special Program
- 1978–1979: Outstanding Directing in a Special Program – Drama or Comedy
- 1980–1986: Outstanding Directing in a Limited Series or Special
- 1987–1992: Outstanding Directing in a Miniseries or Special
- 1993–1996: Outstanding Individual Achievement in Directing for a Miniseries or Special
- 1997–1998: Outstanding Directing for a Miniseries or Special
- 1999–2000: Outstanding Directing for a Miniseries or Movie
- 2001–2002: Outstanding Directing for a Miniseries, Movie, or Special
- 2003–2015: Outstanding Directing for a Miniseries, Movie, or Dramatic Special
- 2016–2020: Outstanding Directing for a Limited Series, Movie, or Dramatic Special
- 2021–present: Outstanding Directing for a Limited or Anthology Series or Movie

== Winners and nominations ==
=== 1970s ===
Year	Program	Episode	Nominee(s)	Network
Outstanding Directorial Achievement in Drama - A Single Program
1971 (23rd)
1971 (23rd)	Hallmark Hall of Fame	"The Price"	Fielder Cook	NBC
1971 (23rd)	Hallmark Hall of Fame	"Hamlet"	Peter Wood	NBC
1971 (23rd)	Movie of the Week on ABC	"Tribes"	Joseph Sargent	ABC
1971 (23rd)	World Premiere NBC Saturday Night Movie	"A Clear and Present Danger"	James Goldstone	NBC
1972 (24th)
1972 (24th)	The New CBS Friday Night Movies	"The Glass House"	Tom Gries	CBS
1972 (24th)	CBS Playhouse 90	"Look Homeward, Angel"	Paul Bogart	CBS
1972 (24th)	The Homecoming: A Christmas Story		Fielder Cook	CBS
1972 (24th)	Hallmark Hall of Fame	"The Snow Goose"	Patrick Garland	NBC
1972 (24th)	Movie of the Week on ABC	"Brian's Song"	Buzz Kulik	ABC
1973 (25th)
1973 (25th)	The CBS Thursday Night Movie	"The Marcus-Nelson Murders"	Joseph Sargent	CBS
1973 (25th)	The New CBS Tuesday Night Movies	"A War of Children"	George Schaefer	CBS
1973 (25th)	Wednesday Movie of the Week on ABC	"That Certain Summer"	Lamont Johnson	ABC
Best Directing in Drama (A Single Program - Comedy or Drama)
1974 (26th)
1974 (26th)	The Autobiography of Miss Jane Pittman		John Korty	CBS
1974 (26th)	ABC Theater	"Pueblo"	Anthony Page	ABC
1974 (26th)	CBS Playhouse 90	"The Migrants"	Tom Gries	CBS
1974 (26th)	NBC Wednesday Night at the Movies	"A Case of Rape"	Boris Sagal	NBC
1974 (26th)	NBC Wednesday Night at the Movies	"The Execution of Private Slovik"	Lamont Johnson	NBC
Outstanding Directing in a Special Program - Drama or Comedy
1975 (27th)
1975 (27th)	ABC Theater	"Love Among the Ruins"	George Cukor	ABC
1975 (27th)	ABC Movie Special	"QB VII"	Tom Gries	ABC
1975 (27th)	ABC Theater	"The Missiles of October"	Anthony Page	ABC
1975 (27th)	NBC World Premiere Movie	"The Law"	John Badham	NBC
1975 (27th)	Queen of the Stardust Ballroom		Sam O'Steen	CBS
Outstanding Directing in a Special Program
1976 (28th)
1976 (28th)	ABC Theater	"Eleanor and Franklin"	Daniel Petrie	ABC
1976 (28th)	ABC Theater	"A Moon for the Misbegotten"	José Quintero and Gordon Rigsby	ABC
1976 (28th)	Babe		Buzz Kulik	CBS
1976 (28th)	Fear on Trial		Lamont Johnson	CBS
Outstanding Directing in a Special Program - Drama or Comedy
1977 (29th)
1977 (29th)	ABC Theater	"Eleanor and Franklin: The White House Years"	Daniel Petrie	ABC
1977 (29th)	The Big Event	"Raid on Entebbe"	Irvin Kershner	NBC
1977 (29th)	The Big Event	"Tail Gunner Joe"	Jud Taylor	NBC
1977 (29th)	Helter Skelter		Tom Gries	CBS
1977 (29th)	NBC World Premiere Movie	"Judge Horton and the Scottsboro Boys"	Fielder Cook	NBC
1978 (30th)
1978 (30th)	The Defection of Simas Kudirka		David Lowell Rich	CBS
1978 (30th)	Bell System Family Theatre	"Our Town"	George Schaefer	NBC
1978 (30th)	Breaking Up		Delbert Mann	ABC
1978 (30th)	The Gathering		Randal Kleiser	ABC
1978 (30th)	Something for Joey		Lou Antonio	CBS
1978 (30th)	Great Performances	"Verna: USO Girl"	Ronald F. Maxwell	PBS
Outstanding Directing in a Limited Seriea or Special
1979 (31st)
1979 (31st)	Friendly Fire		David Greene	ABC
1979 (31st)	Les Misérables		Glenn Jordan	CBS
1979 (31st)	Silent Victory: The Kitty O'Neil Story		Lou Antonio	CBS

=== 1980s ===
Year	Program	Episode	Nominee(s)	Network
Outstanding Directing in a Limited Series or Special
1980 (32nd)
1980 (32nd)	Attica		Marvin J. Chomsky	ABC
1980 (32nd)	Amber Waves		Joseph Sargent	ABC
1980 (32nd)	Guyana Tragedy: The Story of Jim Jones		William Graham	CBS
1980 (32nd)	Hallmark Hall of Fame	"All Quiet on the Western Front"	Delbert Mann	ABC
1980 (32nd)	Moviola	"The Scarlett O'Hara War"	John Erman	NBC
1981 (33rd)
1981 (33rd)	Kent State		James Goldstone	NBC
1981 (33rd)	Bitter Harvest		Roger Young	NBC
1981 (33rd)	Masada	"Part 4"	Boris Sagal (posthumously)	ABC
1981 (33rd)	The Shadow Box		Paul Newman	ABC
1981 (33rd)	Shōgun	"Part 5"	Jerry London	NBC
1982 (34th)
1982 (34th)	Inside the Third Reich		Marvin J. Chomsky	ABC
1982 (34th)	Brideshead Revisited	"Et in Arcadia Ego"	Michael Lindsay-Hogg and Charles Sturridge	PBS
1982 (34th)	Mae West		Lee Philips	ABC
1982 (34th)	Skokie		Herbert Wise	CBS
1983 (35th)
1983 (35th)	Who Will Love My Children?		John Erman	ABC
1983 (35th)	Smiley's People	"Part 6"	Simon Langton	Syndicated
1983 (35th)	Special Bulletin		Edward Zwick	NBC
1983 (35th)	The Thorn Birds	"Part 2"	Daryl Duke	ABC
1983 (35th)	The Winds of War	"Into the Maelstrom"	Dan Curtis	ABC
1984 (36th)
1984 (36th)	American Playhouse	"Concealed Enemies"	Jeff Bleckner	PBS
1984 (36th)	ABC Theater	"The Day After"	Nicholas Meyer	ABC
1984 (36th)	ABC Theater	"Something About Amelia"	Randa Haines	ABC
1984 (36th)	ABC Theater	"A Streetcar Named Desire"	John Erman	ABC
1984 (36th)	Ernie Kovacs: Between the Laughter		Lamont Johnson	ABC
1985 (37th)
1985 (37th)	Wallenberg: A Hero's Story		Lamont Johnson	NBC
1985 (37th)	ABC Theater	"Consenting Adult"	Gilbert Cates	ABC
1985 (37th)	The Burning Bed		Robert Greenwald	NBC
1985 (37th)	Do You Remember Love		Jeff Bleckner	CBS
1985 (37th)	Fatal Vision		David Greene	NBC
1985 (37th)	The Jewel in the Crown	"Crossing the River"	Christopher Morahan and Jim O'Brien	PBS
Outstanding Directing in a Miniseries or Special
1986 (38th)
1986 (38th)	Hallmark Hall of Fame	"Love Is Never Silent"	Joseph Sargent	NBC
1986 (38th)	ABC Theater	"The Execution of Raymond Graham"	Daniel Petrie	ABC
1986 (38th)	Death of a Salesman		Volker Schlöndorff	CBS
1986 (38th)	An Early Frost		John Erman	NBC
1986 (38th)	Hallmark Hall of Fame	"Resting Place"	John Korty	CBS
1987 (39th)
1987 (39th)	Hallmark Hall of Fame	"Promise"	Glenn Jordan	CBS
1987 (39th)	Escape from Sobibor		Jack Gold	CBS
1987 (39th)	LBJ: The Early Years		Peter Werner	NBC
1987 (39th)	Nutcracker: Money, Madness & Murder	"Part 1"	Paul Bogart	NBC
1987 (39th)	Unnatural Causes		Lamont Johnson	NBC
1988 (40th)
1988 (40th)	Lincoln		Lamont Johnson	NBC
1988 (40th)	The Attic: The Hiding of Anne Frank		John Erman	CBS
1988 (40th)	Billionaire Boys Club		Marvin J. Chomsky	NBC
1988 (40th)	Echoes in the Darkness		Glenn Jordan	CBS
1988 (40th)	The Taking of Flight 847: The Uli Derickson Story		Paul Wendkos	NBC
1989 (41st)
1989 (41st)	Lonesome Dove	"Part 1" & "Part 4"	Simon Wincer	CBS
1989 (41st)	Hallmark Hall of Fame	"My Name Is Bill W."	Daniel Petrie	ABC
1989 (41st)	I Know My First Name is Steven		Larry Elikann	NBC
1989 (41st)	Roe vs. Wade		Gregory Hoblit	NBC
1989 (41st)	War and Remembrance	"Part 6" & "Part 7"	Dan Curtis	ABC

=== 1990s ===
Year	Program	Episode	Nominee(s)	Network
Outstanding Directing in a Miniseries or Special
1990 (42nd)
1990 (42nd)	Hallmark Hall of Fame	"Caroline?"	Joseph Sargent	CBS
1990 (42nd)	AT&T Presents	"The Final Days"	Richard Pearce	ABC
1990 (42nd)	Do You Know the Muffin Man?		Gilbert Cates	CBS
1990 (42nd)	The Kennedys of Massachusetts		Lamont Johnson	ABC
1990 (42nd)	A Killing in a Small Town		Stephen Gyllenhaal	CBS
1991 (43rd)
1991 (43rd)	The Josephine Baker Story		Brian Gibson	HBO
1991 (43rd)	Absolute Strangers		Gilbert Cates	CBS
1991 (43rd)	Hallmark Hall of Fame	"Decoration Day"	Robert Markowitz	NBC
1991 (43rd)	Hallmark Hall of Fame	"Sarah, Plain and Tall"	Glenn Jordan	CBS
Outstanding Individual Achievement in Directing for a Miniseries or Special
1992 (44th)
1992 (44th)	Hallmark Hall of Fame	"Miss Rose White"	Joseph Sargent	NBC
1992 (44th)	Broadway Bound		Paul Bogart	ABC
1992 (44th)	Crash Landing: The Rescue of Flight 232		Lamont Johnson	ABC
1992 (44th)	Homefront	"Pilot"	Ron Lagomarsino	ABC
1992 (44th)	I'll Fly Away	"Pilot"	Joshua Brand	NBC
1992 (44th)	Mark Twain and Me		Daniel Petrie	Disney
1993 (45th)
1993 (45th)	Sinatra		James Steven Sadwith	CBS
1993 (45th)	Barbarians at the Gate		Glenn Jordan	HBO
1993 (45th)	Citizen Cohn		Frank Pierson	HBO
1993 (45th)	The Positively True Adventures of the Alleged Texas Cheerleader-Murdering Mom		Michael Ritchie	HBO
1993 (45th)	A Town Torn Apart		Daniel Petrie	NBC
1994 (46th)
1994 (46th)	Against the Wall		John Frankenheimer	HBO
1994 (46th)	And the Band Played On		Roger Spottiswoode	HBO
1994 (46th)	Gypsy		Emile Ardolino	CBS
1994 (46th)	My Breast		Betty Thomas	CBS
1994 (46th)	Hallmark Hall of Fame	"To Dance with the White Dog"	Glenn Jordan	CBS
1995 (47th)
1995 (47th)	The Burning Season		John Frankenheimer	HBO
1995 (47th)	Citizen X		Chris Gerolmo	HBO
1995 (47th)	Hallmark Hall of Fame	"The Piano Lesson"	Lloyd Richards	CBS
1995 (47th)	Indictment: The McMartin Trial		Mick Jackson	HBO
1995 (47th)	Serving in Silence: The Margarethe Cammermeyer Story		Jeff Bleckner	NBC
Outstanding Directing for a Miniseries or Special
1996 (48th)
1996 (48th)	Andersonville		John Frankenheimer	TNT
1996 (48th)	Almost Golden: The Jessica Savitch Story		Peter Werner	Lifetime
1996 (48th)	Gulliver's Travels		Charles Sturridge	NBC
1996 (48th)	The Heidi Chronicles		Paul Bogart	TNT
1996 (48th)	The Late Shift		Betty Thomas	HBO
1997 (49th)
1997 (49th)	The Odyssey		Andrei Konchalovsky	NBC
1997 (49th)	Bastard out of Carolina		Anjelica Huston	Showtime
1997 (49th)	Crime of the Century		Mark Rydell	HBO
1997 (49th)	Gotti		Robert Harmon	HBO
1997 (49th)	In the Gloaming		Christopher Reeve	HBO
Outstanding Directing for a Miniseries or Movie
1998 (50th)
1998 (50th)	George Wallace		John Frankenheimer	TNT
1998 (50th)	12 Angry Men		William Friedkin	Showtime
1998 (50th)	Don King: Only in America		John Herzfeld	HBO
1998 (50th)	From the Earth to the Moon	"Can We Do This?"	Tom Hanks	HBO
1998 (50th)	Merlin		Steve Barron	NBC
1999 (51st)
1999 (51st)	The Temptations		Allan Arkush	NBC
1999 (51st)	The Baby Dance		Jane Anderson	Showtime
1999 (51st)	Dash and Lilly		Kathy Bates	A&E
1999 (51st)	Joan of Arc		Christian Duguay	CBS
1999 (51st)	A Lesson Before Dying		Joseph Sargent	HBO

=== 2000s ===
Year	Program	Episode	Nominee(s)	Network
Outstanding Directing for a Miniseries, Movie or Special
2000 (52nd)
2000 (52nd)	The Corner		Charles S. Dutton	HBO
2000 (52nd)	Annie		Rob Marshall	ABC
2000 (52nd)	Fail Safe		Stephen Frears and Martin Pasetta	CBS
2000 (52nd)	Introducing Dorothy Dandridge		Martha Coolidge	HBO
2000 (52nd)	RKO 281		Benjamin Ross	HBO
2001 (53rd)
2001 (53rd)	Wit		Mike Nichols	HBO
2001 (53rd)	61*		Billy Crystal	HBO
2001 (53rd)	Anne Frank: The Whole Story		Robert Dornhelm	ABC
2001 (53rd)	Conspiracy		Frank Pierson	HBO
2001 (53rd)	Life with Judy Garland: Me and My Shadows		Robert Allan Ackerman	ABC
Outstanding Directing for a Miniseries, Movie or Dramatic Special
2002 (54th)
2002 (54th)	Band of Brothers		David Frankel, Tom Hanks, David Leland, Richard Loncraine, David Nutter, Phil Alden Robinson, Mikael Salomon, and Tony To	HBO
2002 (54th)	The Gathering Storm		Richard Loncraine	HBO
2002 (54th)	James Dean		Mark Rydell	TNT
2002 (54th)	The Laramie Project		Moisés Kaufman	HBO
2002 (54th)	Path to War		John Frankenheimer	HBO
2003 (55th)
2003 (55th)	Door to Door		Steven Schachter	TNT
2003 (55th)	Live from Baghdad		Mick Jackson	HBO
2003 (55th)	My House in Umbria		Richard Loncraine	HBO
2003 (55th)	The Roman Spring of Mrs. Stone		Robert Allan Ackerman	Showtime
2003 (55th)	Soldier's Girl		Frank Pierson	Showtime
2004 (56th)
2004 (56th)	Angels in America		Mike Nichols	HBO
2004 (56th)	Ike: Countdown to D-Day		Robert Harmon	A&E
2004 (56th)	The Lion in Winter		Andrei Konchalovsky	Showtime
2004 (56th)	Prime Suspect 6: The Last Witness		Tom Hooper	PBS
2004 (56th)	Something the Lord Made		Joseph Sargent	HBO
2005 (57th)
2005 (57th)	The Life and Death of Peter Sellers		Stephen Hopkins	HBO
2005 (57th)	Empire Falls		Fred Schepisi	HBO
2005 (57th)	Lackawanna Blues		George C. Wolfe	HBO
2005 (57th)	Warm Springs		Joseph Sargent	HBO
2006 (58th)
2006 (58th)	Elizabeth I		Tom Hooper	HBO
2006 (58th)	Bleak House		Justin Chadwick	PBS
2006 (58th)	Flight 93		Peter Markle	A&E
2006 (58th)	The Girl in the Café		David Yates	HBO
2006 (58th)	High School Musical		Kenny Ortega	Disney
2006 (58th)	Mrs. Harris		Phyllis Nagy	HBO
2007 (59th)
2007 (59th)	Prime Suspect: The Final Act		Philip Martin	PBS
2007 (59th)	Broken Trail		Walter Hill	AMC
2007 (59th)	Bury My Heart at Wounded Knee		Yves Simoneau	HBO
2007 (59th)	Jane Eyre		Susanna White	PBS
2007 (59th)	Tsunami: The Aftermath		Bharat Nalluri	HBO
2008 (60th)
2008 (60th)	Recount		Jay Roach	HBO
2008 (60th)	Bernard and Doris		Bob Balaban	HBO
2008 (60th)	The Company		Mikael Salomon	TNT
2008 (60th)	Extras	"The Extra Special Series Finale"	Ricky Gervais and Stephen Merchant	HBO
2008 (60th)	John Adams		Tom Hooper	HBO
2009 (61st)
2009 (61st)	Little Dorrit	"Part 1"	Dearbhla Walsh	PBS
2009 (61st)	Generation Kill	"Bomb in the Garden"	Susanna White	HBO
2009 (61st)	Grey Gardens		Michael Sucsy	HBO
2009 (61st)	Into the Storm		Thaddeus O'Sullivan	HBO
2009 (61st)	Taking Chance		Ross Katz	HBO
2009 (61st)	Wallander: One Step Behind		Philip Martin	PBS

=== 2010s ===
Year	Program	Episode	Nominee(s)	Network
Outstanding Directing for a Miniseries, Movie or Dramatic Special
2010 (62nd)
2010 (62nd)	Temple Grandin		Mick Jackson	HBO
2010 (62nd)	Georgia O'Keeffe		Bob Balaban	Lifetime
2010 (62nd)	The Pacific	"Part 8"	David Nutter and Jeremy Podeswa	HBO
2010 (62nd)	The Pacific	"Part 9"	Tim Van Patten	HBO
2010 (62nd)	You Don't Know Jack		Barry Levinson	HBO
2011 (63rd)
2011 (63rd)	Downton Abbey	"Episode One"	Brian Percival	PBS
2011 (63rd)	Carlos		Olivier Assayas	Sundance
2011 (63rd)	Cinema Verite		Shari Springer Berman and Robert Pulcini	HBO
2011 (63rd)	Mildred Pierce		Todd Haynes	HBO
2011 (63rd)	Too Big to Fail		Curtis Hanson	HBO
2012 (64th)
2012 (64th)	Game Change		Jay Roach	HBO
2012 (64th)	Hatfields & McCoys		Kevin Reynolds	History
2012 (64th)	Hemingway & Gellhorn		Philip Kaufman	HBO
2012 (64th)	Luther		Sam Miller	BBC America
2012 (64th)	Sherlock	"A Scandal in Belgravia"	Paul McGuigan	PBS
2013 (65th)
2013 (65th)	Behind the Candelabra		Steven Soderbergh	HBO
2013 (65th)	The Girl		Julian Jarrold	HBO
2013 (65th)	Phil Spector		David Mamet	HBO
2013 (65th)	Ring of Fire		Allison Anders	Lifetime
2013 (65th)	Top of the Lake	"Part 5"	Jane Campion and Garth Davis	Sundance
2014 (66th)
2014 (66th)	Fargo	"Buridan's Ass"	Colin Bucksey	FX
2014 (66th)	American Horror Story: Coven	"Bitchcraft"	Alfonso Gomez-Rejon	FX
2014 (66th)	Fargo	"The Crocodile's Dilemma"	Adam Bernstein	FX
2014 (66th)	Muhammad Ali's Greatest Fight		Stephen Frears	HBO
2014 (66th)	The Normal Heart		Ryan Murphy	HBO
2014 (66th)	Sherlock: His Last Vow		Nick Hurran	PBS
Outstanding Directing for a Limited Series, Movie or Dramatic Special
2015 (67th)
2015 (67th)	Olive Kitteridge		Lisa Cholodenko	HBO
2015 (67th)	American Horror Story: Freak Show	"Monsters Among Us"	Ryan Murphy	FX
2015 (67th)	Bessie		Dee Rees	HBO
2015 (67th)	The Honorable Woman		Hugo Blick	Sundance
2015 (67th)	Houdini		Uli Edel	History
2015 (67th)	The Missing		Tom Shankland	Starz
2015 (67th)	Wolf Hall		Peter Kosminsky	PBS
2016 (68th)
2016 (68th)	The Night Manager		Susanne Bier	AMC
2016 (68th)	All the Way		Jay Roach	HBO
2016 (68th)	Fargo	"Before the Law"	Noah Hawley	FX
2016 (68th)	The People v. O. J. Simpson: American Crime Story	"From the Ashes of Tragedy"	Ryan Murphy	FX
2016 (68th)	The People v. O. J. Simpson: American Crime Story	"Manna from Heaven"	Anthony Hemingway	FX
2016 (68th)	The People v. O. J. Simpson: American Crime Story	"The Race Card"	John Singleton	FX
2017 (69th)
2017 (69th)	Big Little Lies		Jean-Marc Vallée	HBO
2017 (69th)	Fargo	"The Law of Vacant Places"	Noah Hawley	FX
2017 (69th)	Feud: Bette and Joan	"And the Winner Is... (The Oscars of 1963)"	Ryan Murphy	FX
2017 (69th)	Genius	"Einstein: Chapter One"	Ron Howard	Nat Geo
2017 (69th)	The Night Of	"The Art of War"	James Marsh	HBO
2017 (69th)	The Night Of	"The Beach"	Steven Zaillian	HBO
2018 (70th)
2018 (70th)	The Assassination of Gianni Versace: American Crime Story	"The Man Who Would Be Vogue"	Ryan Murphy	FX
2018 (70th)	Godless		Scott Frank	Netflix
2018 (70th)	Jesus Christ Superstar Live in Concert		David Leveaux and Alex Rudzinski	NBC
2018 (70th)	The Looming Tower	"9/11"	Craig Zisk	Hulu
2018 (70th)	Paterno		Barry Levinson	HBO
2018 (70th)	Patrick Melrose		Edward Berger	Showtime
2018 (70th)	Twin Peaks		David Lynch	Showtime
2019 (71st)
2019 (71st)	Chernobyl		Johan Renck	HBO
2019 (71st)	Escape at Dannemora		Ben Stiller	Showtime
2019 (71st)	Fosse/Verdon	"Glory"	Jessica Yu	FX
2019 (71st)	Fosse/Verdon	"Who's Got the Pain?"	Thomas Kail	FX
2019 (71st)	A Very English Scandal		Stephen Frears	Prime Video
2019 (71st)	When They See Us		Ava DuVernay	Netflix

=== 2020s ===
Year	Program	Episode	Nominee(s)	Network
Outstanding Directing for a Limited Series, Movie or Dramatic Special
2020 (72nd)
2020 (72nd)	Unorthodox		Maria Schrader	Netflix
2020 (72nd)	Little Fires Everywhere	"Find a Way"	Lynn Shelton (posthumous)	Hulu
2020 (72nd)	Normal People	"Episode 5"	Lenny Abrahamson	Hulu
2020 (72nd)	Watchmen	"It's Summer and We're Running Out of Ice"	Nicole Kassell	HBO
2020 (72nd)	Watchmen	"Little Fear of Lightning"	Steph Green	HBO
2020 (72nd)	Watchmen	"This Extraordinary Being"	Stephen Williams	HBO
Outstanding Directing for a Limited or Anthology Series or Movie
2021 (73rd)
2021 (73rd)	The Queen's Gambit		Scott Frank	Netflix
2021 (73rd)	Hamilton		Thomas Kail	Disney+
2021 (73rd)	I May Destroy You	"Ego Death"	Sam Miller and Michaela Coel	HBO
2021 (73rd)	I May Destroy You	"Eyes Eyes Eyes Eyes"	Sam Miller	HBO
2021 (73rd)	Mare of Easttown		Craig Zobel	HBO
2021 (73rd)	The Underground Railroad		Barry Jenkins	Prime Video
2021 (73rd)	WandaVision		Matt Shakman	Disney+
2022 (74th)
2022 (74th)	The White Lotus		Mike White	HBO
2022 (74th)	Dopesick	"The People vs. Purdue Pharma"	Danny Strong	Hulu
2022 (74th)	The Dropout	"Green Juice"	Michael Showalter	Hulu
2022 (74th)	The Dropout	"Iron Sisters"	Francesca Gregorini	Hulu
2022 (74th)	Maid	"Sky Blue"	John Wells	Netflix
2022 (74th)	Station Eleven	"Wheel of Fire"	Hiro Murai	HBO Max
2023 (75th)
2023 (75th)	Beef	"Figures of Light"	Lee Sung Jin	Netflix
2023 (75th)	Beef	"The Great Fabricator"	Jake Schreier	Netflix
2023 (75th)	Dahmer – Monster: The Jeffrey Dahmer Story	"Bad Meat"	Carl Franklin	Netflix
2023 (75th)	Dahmer – Monster: The Jeffrey Dahmer Story	"Silenced"	Paris Barclay	Netflix
2023 (75th)	Fleishman Is in Trouble	"Me-Time"	Jonathan Dayton and Valerie Faris	FX
2023 (75th)	Prey		Dan Trachtenberg	Hulu
2024 (76th)
2024 (76th)	Ripley		Steven Zaillian	Netflix
2024 (76th)	Baby Reindeer	"Episode 4"	Weronika Tofilska	Netflix
2024 (76th)	Fargo	"The Tragedy of the Commons"	Noah Hawley	FX
2024 (76th)	Feud: Capote vs. The Swans	"Pilot"	Gus Van Sant	FX
2024 (76th)	Lessons in Chemistry	"Poirot"	Millicent Shelton	Apple TV+
2024 (76th)	True Detective: Night Country		Issa López	HBO
2025 (77th)
2025 (77th)	Adolescence		Philip Barantini	Netflix
2025 (77th)	Dying for Sex	"It's Not That Serious"	Shannon Murphy	FX
2025 (77th)	The Penguin	"Cent'Anni"	Helen Shaver	HBO
2025 (77th)	The Penguin	"A Great or Little Thing"	Jennifer Getzinger	HBO
2025 (77th)	Sirens	"Exile"	Nicole Kassell	Netflix
2025 (77th)	Zero Day		Lesli Linka Glatter	Netflix
2026 (78th)
2026 (78th)	DTF St. Louis		Steven Conrad	HBO
2026 (78th)	Beef	"It Will Stay This Way and You Will Obey"	Jake Schreier	Netflix
2026 (78th)	Beef	"Oh, the Comfort, the Inexpressible Comfort"	Lee Sung Jin	Netflix
2026 (78th)	Black Rabbit	"The Black Rabbits"	Jason Bateman	Netflix

== Total awards by network ==
- HBO – 17
- CBS – 8
- NBC – 8
- ABC – 7
- PBS – 4
- Netflix – 4
- TNT – 3
- FX – 2
- AMC – 1

== Directors with multiple wins ==
4 wins

- John Frankenheimer (3 consecutive)
- Joseph Sargent

2 wins

- Marvin J. Chomsky
- Lamont Johnson
- Mike Nichols
- Daniel Petrie (consecutive)
- Jay Roach

== Directors with multiple nominations ==
9 nominations

- Lamont Johnson
- Joseph Sargent

6 nominations

- Glenn Jordan
- Daniel Petrie

5 nominations

- John Erman
- John Frankenheimer
- Ryan Murphy

4 nominations

- Paul Bogart
- Tom Gries

3 nominations

- Jeff Bleckner
- Gilbert Cates
- Marvin J. Chomsky
- Fielder Cook
- Stephen Frears
- Noah Hawley
- Tom Hooper
- Mick Jackson
- Richard Loncraine
- Sam Miller
- Frank Pierson
- Jay Roach

2 nominations

- Robert Allan Ackerman
- Lou Antonio
- Bob Balaban
- Dan Curtis
- Scott Frank
- James Goldstone
- David Greene
- Tom Hanks
- Robert Harmon
- Andrei Konchalovsky
- John Korty
- Nicole Kassell
- Buzz Kulik
- Barry Levinson
- Delbert Mann
- Philip Martin
- Mike Nichols
- David Nutter
- Anthony Page
- Mark Rydell
- Boris Sagal
- Mikael Salomon
- George Schaefer
- Jake Schreier
- Charles Sturridge
- Lee Sung Jin
- Betty Thomas
- Peter Werner
- Susanna White
- Steven Zaillian

== Programs with multiple nominations ==
5 nominations

- Fargo

4 nominations

- American Crime Story
- Beef

3 nominations

- Watchmen

2 nominations

- American Horror Story
- Dahmer – Monster: The Jeffrey Dahmer Story
- Feud
- Fosse/Verdon
- I May Destroy You
- The Night Of
- The Pacific
- Prime Suspect
- Sherlock
