= Milt Kogan =

American actor (born 1936)

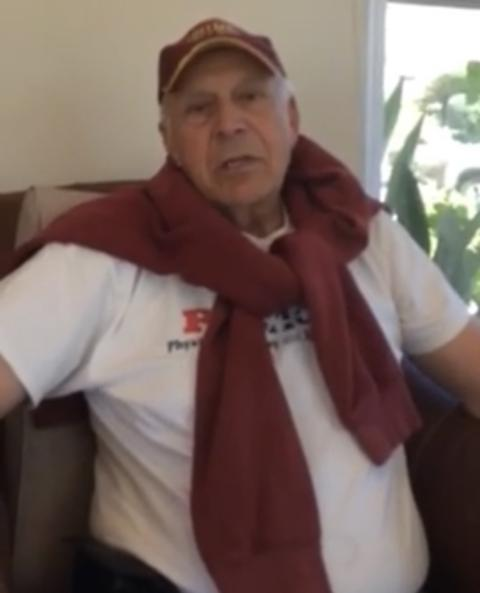
- Kogan in 2018
- Born: Milton Lewis Kogan; April 10, 1936 (age 90); Philadelphia, Pennsylvania, U.S.
- Occupations: Actor, Physician
- Years active: 1962–2012 (as actor)
- Spouse(s): Susan Quast, 1983–present (2 children); Virginia Freeman "Dena" Lambie 1965–1976, divorced (1 child)

Milt Kogan (born April 10, 1936) is an American actor. He made well over 100 guest appearances on American network television shows. He is perhaps best known for playing Desk Sergeant Kogan on six episodes of the sitcom television series Barney Miller, and for appearing in six different roles in the 1970s on Police Story.

== Early life and career ==
Milt is an M.D. who practices board-certified Family Medicine in Los Angeles, California. He entered Cornell University with the class of 1957, but left after his junior year to earn his medical degree. He returned to Cornell to finish his B.S. in Animal Science fifty years later, graduating in 2007. As an undergraduate, he was a member of the Quill and Dagger society. He also holds an M.P.H. (Epidemiology) from University of California, Los Angeles (1974–1976). He was a Peace Corps Physician in West Africa (1969–1972), practiced with the National Health Service Corps in Harlowton, Montana (1982–1983), served with the U.S. Army in Hanau, West Germany (1984–1986) and practiced in Vermillion, South Dakota (1996–1998). He speaks English, French, German, and Spanish.

Published works include: Escape From Montana (2009), Diary of the Ouagadougou Doc (2010), and Second Act (2010).

== Filmography ==
=== Films ===
Year	Film	Role	Director	Notes
1975	The Swinging Barmaids	Dan	Gus Trikonis	
1975	Darktown Strutters	Officer Babel	William Witney	
1975	The Sunshine Boys	Doctor	Herbert Ross	
1975	Lucky Lady	Supercargo	Stanley Donen	
1976	No Deposit, No Return	Policeman	Norman Tokar	
1976	Dr. Black, Mr. Hyde	Lt. Harry O'Connor	William Crain	
1977	Big Time	FBI Chief	Andrew Georgias	
1977	Herowork	D.A. Durney	Michael Adrian	
1978	The Fifth Floor	Dr. Shaw	Howard Avedis	
1979	The Lady in Red	Preacher	Lewis Teague	
1982	E.T. the Extra-Terrestrial	Medican Unit	Steven Spielberg	Credited as "Milt Kogan, M.D."
1983	Angel of H.E.A.T.	Harry Covert	Myrl A. Schreibman	
1983	Wavelength	Chief Pathologist	Mike Gray	
1983	My Therapist	Steve Kovacs	Gary Legon and Al Rossi	
1983	Erotic Images	Herb Todd	Declan Langan	
1984	Bachelor Party	Restaurant Customer	Neal Israel	
1984	The Woman in Red	Air Traffic Boss	Gene Wilder	
1985	Brewster's Millions	Heller	Walter Hill	
1986	The Check Is in the Mail...	Mr. Fanning	Joan Darling and Ted Kotcheff	
2002	Random Shooting in L.A.	Dan	Jeffrey Delman	
2002	Jennifer Is Dead	Dr. Schill	Joel Bender	Short film
2009	Dandelion Dharma	Jonathan Worth	Veronica DiPippo	Short film
2010	Hesher	Doctor	Spencer Susser	
2011	The Descendants	Dr. Johnston	Alexander Payne	
2012	Guess Whom	Milt McNaulty	Jason Sax	Short film
2017	Maydeleh and the Prisoner	Arie Weiss	Maya Ben Yair	Short film

=== Television ===
Year(s)	Title	Role(s)	Notes
1962	Dr. Kildare	Dr. Theodore Regan	S1E25 "Solomon's Choice"
1962	The Law and Mr. Jones	Policeman	S2E1 "No News Is Good News"
1962–1963	The Dick Powell Show	Jerry Sindell; Dr. Walters	S1E17 "Prince of Tomatoes"; S2E22 "Tissue of Hate"
1963	General Hospital	Irv	
1968	Judd, for the Defense	Dr. March	S2E2 "Transplant"
1968	It Takes a Thief	Man A	S2E4 "The Thingamabob Heist"
1968	Mission: Impossible	David Singleton	S3E11 "The Freeze"
1973	Legend in Granite	Ray Nitschke	TV movie
1973–1974	Ironside	2nd Economist; Bernstein	S7E5 "The Armageddon Gang"; S7E20 "Close to the Heart"
1973–1977	Police Story	Various roles	6 episodes
1974	McMillan & Wife	Herb Sinclair	S3E5 "Reunion in Terror"
1974	I Love You... Good-Bye	Alton Stockard	ABC Movie of the Week
1974	Harry O	Dr. Rodman	S1E2 "The Admiral's Lady"
1974	The Six Million Dollar Man	Major, A.F.	S2E2 "The Pioneers"
1974	Sanford and Son	Hotel Detective	S4E3 "Ol' Brown Eyes"
1974	Mannix	Les	S8E4 "Walk on the Blind Side"
1974	The Law	Detective Milt Vinton	TV movie
1974	Sons and Daughters	Boys V.P.	S1E9 "The Tryst"
1974–1978	The Rockford Files	Various roles	3 episodes
1975	The Rookies	Francis Grimm; Dr. Garfield	S3E17 "Solomon's Paradise"; S4E6 "Reign of Terror"
1975	Barney Miller	Officer Kogan	6 episodes
1975	The ABC Afternoon Playbreak	Sonny Miller	S3E4 "The Girl Who Couldn't Lose"
1975	S.W.A.T.	Market Owner	S1E4 "Pressure Cooker: S2E13 "Terror Ship"
1975	One of Our Own	Dr. Korngold	TV movie
1975	The Invisible Man	Doctor	Pilot episode
1975	The Merv Griffin Show	Self (Guest)	S13E21 "Jason Robards, Florence Henderson, Milt Kogan, Skiles and Henderson"
1975	Fear on Trial	Herb Steinmann	TV movie
1975	Cannon	Doctor	S5E5 "The Victim"
1975	Starsky & Hutch	Manny	S1E7 "Death Notice"
1975	Joe Forrester	Milt Gold	S1E8 "Target: Mexican Syndicate"
1976	Switch	Doctor; Frank Reed	S1E15 "The Walking Bomb"; S2E3 "Fleece of Snow"
1976	Rich Man, Poor Man	Doctor	S1E4 "Part IV: Chapter 6"
1976	City of Angels	Buster	S1E7 "Palm Springs Answer"
1976	Kingston: Confidential	Lieutenant Vokeman	TV movie
1976	Shazam!	Jack Michaels	S3E2 "Bitter Herbs"
1976–1977	Kojak	Dr. Martin Laing; Al Grant	S3E17 "A Wind from Corsica"; S5E5 "Once More from Birdland"
1977	Bunco	Lt. Hyatt	TV movie
1977	Delvecchio	Assistant D.A. Mitchell	S1E16 "Licensed to Kill"
1977	Rafferty		S1E2 "Brothers & Sons"
1977	The New Adventures of Wonder Woman	Kalanin	S2E9 "The Man Who Made Volcanoes"
1977	The Storyteller	Phil Curry	TV movie
1978	Eight Is Enough	Coach	S2E19 "Hard Hats and Hard Heads"
1978	Columbo	Dubbing Chief	S7E3 "Make Me a Perfect Murder"
1978	Loose Change	Eddie Luchek	S1E3 "Part III: Being Free"
1978	Chico and the Man	Officer Lucius	S4E16 "A New Girl in Town"
1978	The Millionaire	Parker	TV movie
1979	The Amazing Spider-Man	Wiley	S2E5 "Photo Finish"
1979	Quincy, M.E.	Dr. Stewart Taylor	S4E18 "Physician, Heal Thyself"
1979	Roots: The Next Generations	Mel Klein	S1E3 "Part VI (1939-1950)"
1979	Dear Detective		S1E1
1979	The White Shadow	Mr. LeGrand	S1E15 "LeGrande Finale"
1980	Diff'rent Strokes	Mr. Haskell	S3E2 "Small Claims Court"
1980	The Misadventures of Sheriff Lobo	Harvey	S2E1 "The Dirtiest Girls in Town"
1981	Shannon		S1E1 "Gotham Swansong"
1981	Lou Grant	McElwain	S5E3 "Reckless"
1982	The Greatest American Hero	Dr. Moran	S2E9 "Train of Thought"; S2E17 "Dreams"
1982–1984	Cagney & Lacey	Hauser; Actor	S2E1 "Witness to an Incident"; S4E3 "Insubordination"
1983	M.A.D.D.: Mothers Against Drunk Drivers	Dr. Christiansen	TV movie
1983	The A-Team	T.K. / Fake Doctor	S1E12 "The Beast from the Belly of a Boeing"
1984	Airwolf	Dr. Rothschild	S1E6 "Echoes from the Past"
1984	The Return of Marcus Welby, M.D.	Perry McMasters	TV movie
1984	Night Court	Doctor	S1E13 "Hi Honey, I'm Home"
1984	Pryor's Place	Solly	S1E1 "High Noon at 5:30 P.M."; S1E2 "To Catch a Little Thief"
1985–1991	Knots Landing	Customer; Mr. Weeks	S6E14 "#14 with a Bullet"; S13E6 "Business with Pleasure"
1987	ABC Afterschool Special	Doctor	S16E2 "The Kid Who Wouldn't Quit: The Brad Silverman Story"
1987	My Two Dads	Lou Harris	S1E7 "Once a Son"
1987	Ohara	Goldberg	S2E8 "And a Child Shall Lead Them"
1988	Terrorist on Trial: The United States vs. Salim Ajami	Dushoff	TV movie
1989	Columbo: Columbo Goes to the Guillotine	Medical Examiner	TV movie
1989	What's Alan Watching?	Mr. Rankin	Television special
1989	Columbo: Grand Deceptions	Medical Examiner	TV movie
1989	Amen	Dr. Norton	S4E2 "Where There's a Will"
1990	Alien Nation	Doctor	S1E18 "Rebirth"
1990	The New Lassie	Dr. Abernathy	S1E14 "I'm Still Alive"
1991	Lies Before Kisses	Policeman #1	TV movie
1992	Final Shot: The Hank Gathers Story	Doctor	TV movie
1992	Quantum Leap	Lucky	S1E14 "It's a Wonderful Leap - May 10, 1958". Credited as Milt Kigan (sic)
1993	Reasonable Doubts	Coach	S2E13 "The Iceman"
1993	Father & Son: Dangerous Relations		TV movie
1993	Good Advice	Mr. Brady	S1E4 "The Kiss"
1995	Night Stand with Dick Dietrick	Artie	S1E14 "I'm Sorry"
2003	44 Minutes: The North Hollywood Shoot-Out	General Manager	TV movie
2008	The Game	Reporter	S2E11 "Je-Rome Wasn't Built in a Day"
2011	Accidentally in Love	Mickey	TV movie
2012	House of Lies	Ink Stain	S1E11 "Business"; S1E12 "The Mayan Apocalypse"
2018	Grace and Frankie	Grumpy But Dapper	S4E5 "The Pop-Ups"
2018	Five Points	Mr. Saroyan	S1E1 "And Yet Here We Are"

=== Video games ===
Year	Title	Role	Notes
1993	SimCity Enhanced CD-ROM	John P. Ferguson, Chief of Police	
