= Columbo season 9 =

Season of television series

Columbo
- Season 9
- No. of episodes: 6

Release
- Original network: ABC
- Original release: November 25, 1989 – May 14, 1990

Season chronology
- ← Previous; Season 8 Next → Season 10

This is a list of episodes from the ninth season of Columbo, which aired as part of The ABC Mystery Movie.

== Episodes ==
No. overall	No. in season	Title	Directed by	Written by	Murderer played by	Victim(s) played by	Original release date	Runtime
50	1	"Murder: A Self Portrait"	James Frawley	Robert Sherman	Patrick Bauchau as Max Barsini	Fionnula Flanagan as Louise Barsini; Harold Harris as Harry Chudnow	November 25, 1989	88 min
Temperamental artist Max Barsini (Patrick Bauchau) effectively lives with three women: his ex-wife, Louise (Fionnula Flanagan), his young live-in model Julie (Isabel García Lorca), and his current wife Vanessa (Shera Danese). Barsini takes delight in the way they fight for his attention. But when Louise begins seeing a therapist, Dr. Hammer (George Coe), who is also her new fiancé, Barsini fears she will reveal that he killed his first agent, who was robbing him. He kills Louise, then makes it look like she drowned at the beach while he was at Vito's bar, painting. Columbo poses for Barsini while investigating him. Final clue/twist: Columbo can prove that a spot on Louise's face was not washed-up make-up but was instead remnants of "Barsini red", a special color mixed only for Barsini, and that it was on the cloth she was benumbed with.
51	2	"Columbo Cries Wolf"	Daryl Duke	William Read Woodfield	Ian Buchanan as Sean Brantley	Deidre Hall as Dian Hunter	January 20, 1990	92 min
When Dian Hunter (Deidre Hall), the partner of men's magazine publisher Sean Brantley (Ian Buchanan), vanishes after expressing a desire to sell her 51% interest to a rival, suspicion falls on Sean and his girlfriend Tina (Rebecca Staab). Columbo sets out to find the body, eventually digging up much of Brantley's estate and breaking open the walls. But after the search turns into a full-blown media event, Dian resurfaces, explaining she needed some time to herself. Dian and Sean planned the disappearance as a publicity stunt to increase sales. But to his shock, she actually intends to sell now that her holding is more valuable. Sean then proceeds to kill Dian for real and hides the body, believing that Columbo will not be allowed to search for it again. Final clue/twist: Dian apparently left wearing a fur coat. Columbo gets suspicious when he sees all her remaining fur coats in plastic storage bags, deducing that Brantley put the body in the missing bag. Knowing he will not be supported in a second full search, he phones the pager Dian wears as a wristlet: it is on her body, behind a finished section of the replacement wall being installed; which Columbo tears down. (The word Columbo uses to ring the pager is "Gotcha".)
52	3	"Agenda for Murder"	Patrick McGoohan	Jeffrey Bloom	Patrick McGoohan as Oscar Finch	Louis Zorich as Frank Staplin	February 10, 1990	92 min
Oscar Finch (Patrick McGoohan) is a lawyer who uses underhanded methods to get his clients off, like coercing Paul Mackey (Denis Arndt), who worked for the D.A.'s office, into destroying evidence against racketeer Frank Staplin (Louis Zorich) in 1969. Twenty-one years later, Mackey is chosen by a presidential candidate, Governor Montgomery (Arthur Hill), to be his vice presidential running mate. Finch himself hopes that he might be appointed as the next Attorney General. Staplin, facing another indictment, threatens to expose the long-ago favor and ruin Finch's and Mackey's political futures if he doesn't arrange the destruction of another document. Finch decides to murder him. He scatters cigar ashes to make it seem he was in a late-night meeting with a contributor when the murder occurred. Finch walks to Staplin's house, shoots him and makes his death look like a suicide. Final clue/twist: After Columbo learns that Staplin hadn't eaten any of the cheese on the dish at the crime scene, but that the block of cheese had had a piece bitten off from it, he assumes that the murderer must have taken a bite. CSI can fabricate a toothprint from the cheese and Columbo finds more than enough samples of Finch's toothprint on his discarded pieces of chewing gum, proving that he was at the crime scene. McGoohan won a second Emmy Award for Outstanding Guest Actor in a Drama Series, following his part in "By Dawn's Early Light".
53	4	"Rest in Peace, Mrs. Columbo"	Vincent McEveety	Peter S. Fischer	Helen Shaver as Vivian Dimitri	Edward Winter as Charlie Chambers	March 31, 1990	93 min
The episode, which uses the in medias res structure, opens at the funeral of Columbo's wife, and is partially told in flashbacks. Vivian Dimitri (Helen Shaver) is a real estate executive whose recently deceased husband had been sent to prison by Columbo. She seeks revenge by plotting to kill the Columbos. But first she murders her boss, Charlie Chambers (Edward Winter), her husband's partner who avoided prison by informing on him. Vivian shoots Chambers in his office, using her affair with the married Leland St. John (Ian McShane) to establish an alibi. Then she plants evidence to make it look like Chambers was killed by disgruntled residents of a new housing development he was constructing. Her plan is then to kill the Columbos with a jar of poisoned marmalade. Roscoe Lee Browne plays her psychiatrist, Dr. Steadman. Final clue/twist: Figuring out Dimitri's plan, Columbo and the police fake the death of his wife. After staging the fake funeral, Columbo invites Vivian into what she thinks is his house. He makes himself toast with marmalade. While Columbo pretends to be dying of poison, Dimitri confesses to all three murders. He then reveals that he had suspected her all along, and had the marmalade tested as soon as she gave it to him. They are actually in the home of another officer, who recorded the confession, and the marmalade jar is a different one lacking poison. Aired as part of the ABC Saturday Mystery series.
54	5	"Uneasy Lies the Crown"	Alan J. Levi	Steven Bochco	James Read as Wesley Corman	Marshall R. Teague as Adam Evans	April 28, 1990	92 min
Dentist Wesley Corman (James Read) decides to get rid of his unfaithful wife, Lydia (Jo Anderson), and use her money to support his gambling habit. When Adam Evans (Marshall R. Teague), a Hollywood heartthrob having an affair with Lydia, comes under his care, Corman puts a time-release poison made from digitalis under a crown. It takes effect when the couple are together that evening and Corman is playing cards with his friends, including Lydia's brother David. Corman convinces David to protect his sister by staging the death as a car accident and he secretly leaves enough evidence implying foul play, thereby framing Lydia for the murder. Paul Burke co-stars as Horace Sherwin, Lydia's father, also a dentist. Final clue/twist: Columbo traps Corman by taking advantage of the fact that Corman was never good at chemistry. He orders Evans' body exhumed and demonstrates to Corman that if there was indeed digitalis, it would have caused a chemical reaction with the porcelain in the crown, making a blue stain on Evans' tooth underneath the crown. Before they begin to examine Evans' mouth, Corman confesses. However, Columbo was bluffing, as digitalis causes no such reaction with porcelain. This same storyline was first used in the McMillan (formerly McMillan & Wife) episode "Affair of the Heart" that had aired in 1977. Bochco shared writing credit for the earlier version with Leonard Stern. McMillan star Nancy Walker also guest stars in this episode as herself.
55	6	"Murder in Malibu"	Walter Grauman	Jackson Gillis	Andrew Stevens as Wayne Jennings	Janet Margolin as Theresa Goren	May 14, 1990	90 min
Best-selling romance novelist Theresa Goren (Janet Margolin) decides to accept the marriage proposal of her boyfriend Wayne Jennings (Andrew Stevens), a playboy half her age. Her sister, Jess McCurdy (Brenda Vaccaro), disapproves of Wayne, considering him a gold digger; while Wayne is out of town, she impersonates her sister on the phone with Wayne and dumps him. An enraged Wayne drives back to town, arranges an alibi and shoots Teresa. He eventually confesses, but then the autopsy proves that Teresa had already been dead, shot earlier with a different gun. Suspicion also falls on Jess when her phone call is revealed. Final clue/twist: Columbo determines that Teresa was redressed to disguise the time of the murder because her Maidenform panties were put on backwards. Columbo reasons that this could only have been done by someone close to her, and by a male, since a female would have known that the tag for Maidenform panties is attached to the left side. This episode departs somewhat from the usual Columbo. While the killer is first seen immediately after shooting the victim, later it casts doubt on that by revealing that this shot had been preceded by another, actually fatal, shot fired from a different gun.
