= Columbo season 7 =

Season of television series

Columbo
- Season 7
- No. of episodes: 5

Release
- Original network: NBC
- Original release: November 21, 1977 – May 13, 1978

Season chronology
- ← Previous; Season 6 Next → Season 8

This is a list of episodes from the seventh season of Columbo.

== Broadcast history ==
Although NBC had brought an end to the Mystery Movie series that Columbo had been a part of since 1971, the network decided to keep the series in production and ordered five new telefilms. The first two aired on Monday nights, the first on November 21, 1977, and the second on January 30, 1978. After that, the remaining three films were broadcast on Saturday nights beginning on February 25, 1978, and concluding with the final film of the original Columbo series on May 13, 1978.

== DVD release ==
The season was released on DVD by Universal Home Video along with season six.

== Episodes ==
No. overall	No. in season	Title	Directed by	Written by	Murderer played by	Victim(s) played by	Original release date	Runtime
41	1	"Try and Catch Me"	James Frawley	Story by : Gene Thompson; Teleplay by : Gene Thompson and Paul Tuckahoe	Ruth Gordon as Abigail Mitchell	Charles Frank as Edmund Galvin	November 21, 1977	70 min
Esteemed mystery author Abigail Mitchell (Ruth Gordon) is convinced that her sole relative, her nephew-in-law Edmund Galvin (Charles Frank), murdered his wife, Mitchell's niece Phyllis, in a boating accident four months earlier and got away with it. Not only that, but Galvin inherited the rights to a play of Mitchell's, which Mitchell had long ago signed over to Phyllis as a present. Mitchell decides to take revenge and murder her nephew-by-marriage. She tricks Galvin into a false sense of security by making him her heir. Then she lures him into her large walk-in safe and slams the door shut, locking him in. Locked in an airless and sound-proofed safe for the whole weekend, Galvin suffocates while Mitchell flies off to New York. Final clue/twist: Columbo eventually solves the case by uncovering clues left by Galvin in the safe before suffocating. Galvin tore a strip from the title page of Mitchell's latest manuscript, "The Night I Was Murdered", and used a match to darken the words "The Night", thus making it read "I Was Murdered by Abigail Mitchell". He then hid the paper strip in the safe's light socket, where Columbo found it. At the end of the episode, Mitchell asks Columbo if he can overlook what she did. Gordon's character is one of the most sympathetic killers caught by Columbo and he seems genuinely sorry to have to arrest her. However, he had earlier cautioned her not to count on his being soft-hearted. She pays him a compliment to his cleverness by remarking that, had he been the detective who had investigated her niece's disappearance, none of this need ever have happened. Mariette Hartley plays Mitchell's trusted assistant, Veronica Bryce, who becomes embroiled in the crime. G. D. Spradlin plays Mitchell’s attorney, who in one scene seems to have guessed what she had done. At the time of the episode's airing, Ruth Gordon was 81 years old, making her the oldest murderer in the Columbo series.
42	2	"Murder Under Glass"	Jonathan Demme	Robert Van Scoyk	Louis Jourdan as Paul Gerard	Michael V. Gazzo as Vittorio Rossi	January 30, 1978	73 min
Paul Gerard (Louis Jourdan) is a renowned restaurant critic, but gets rich extorting money from upscale restaurant owners in return for good reviews. When one of them, Vittorio Rossi (Michael V. Gazzo), decides to no longer pay and expose Gerard, the critic kills him with a bottle of wine poisoned with the toxin derived from fugu, a blowfish used in Japanese cuisine. Final clue/twist: Columbo figures out that Gerard poisoned the wine via the needle of the bottle opener, not in the pressure cartridge itself. He tricks Gerard into attempting to poison him in the same way, which provides the final evidence. Columbo then tells Gerard he suspected him almost immediately because Gerard did not rush to a hospital to be examined after the police informed him the man he just had dinner with died from poison. Throughout the episode, Columbo and Gerard have been respectful to one another, but both finally admit that they dislike each other. Columbo nonetheless asks Gerard what he thinks of the meal he has just prepared, and the charming murderer says, "I wish you had been a chef." Richard Dysart, France Nuyen and Larry D. Mann also appear. Antony Alda plays Rossi's nephew, Mario, who speaks only Italian. Mako appears as a visitor from Japan. Falk's real-life wife Shera Danese returns as Gerard's secretary/treasurer/mistress Eve Plummer, who is being manipulated by Gerard into managing the slush fund for the payoffs from the restaurateurs. Writer Robert Van Scoyk received an Edgar Allan Poe Award from the Mystery Writers of America for his teleplay. This episode was the first television directorial work from Jonathan Demme, better known for his later film work on movies such as The Silence of the Lambs and Philadelphia.
43	3	"Make Me a Perfect Murder"	James Frawley	Robert Blees	Trish Van Devere as Kay Freestone	Laurence Luckinbill as Mark McAndrews	February 25, 1978	97 min
West Coast television production boss Mark McAndrews (Laurence Luckinbill) is promoted to a high-level position in New York. He fails to name as his replacement the logical successor, TV programmer Kay Freestone (Trish Van Devere), because she is also his lover. He gives her, as a consolation prize, a new Mercedes. She is more interested in a gun he holds while he jokingly invites her to shoot him. Freestone takes him up on it during an important preview for a new made-for-TV movie called "The Professional", that she helped produce. She tricks the projectionist (James McEachin) by fiddling with the projector's timer and then sending him on an errand. Freestone sneaks up to McAndrews's office and shoots him, then returns, hiding the gun above the ceiling panels of an elevator, to make the reel change successfully before the projectionist gets back. Patrick O'Neal plays Frank Flanagan, her boss. It was once held that Van Devere's husband, actor George C. Scott, has an uncredited cameo as a television technician, but that claim has been debunked. Lainie Kazan is cast as a singer who cannot perform due to stage fright and drug use. Final clue/twist: Kay sees what she thinks is the murder weapon, now visible against the lights of the elevator ceiling. She recovers and gets rid of it. Columbo reveals that the actual gun had been discovered by the police some time before, and an imitation was put where she would see it, to find out what she would do. That she got rid of what she thought was the murder weapon proves she must be the killer. This is the final episode to feature Mike Lally, who appeared in a total of 28 Columbo episodes, beginning with "Short Fuse" in season one. He died in 1985, aged 84.
44	4	"How to Dial a Murder"	James Frawley	Story by : Anthony Lawrence; Teleplay by : Tom Lazarus	Nicol Williamson as Eric Mason	Joel Fabiani as Charlie Hunter	April 15, 1978	73 min
Psychiatrist Dr. Eric Mason (Nicol Williamson), who uses two trained Doberman Pinschers, Laurel and Hardy, to maul his best friend Dr. Charlie Hunter (Joel Fabiani) to death, by having Hunter utter a special trigger word. Hunter had been having an affair with Dr. Mason's now-deceased wife, who Mason may also have murdered. Kim Cattrall plays the resident of Mason's guest house who discovers the body. Ed Begley Jr. has a minor role as an animal control officer and Tricia O'Neil plays a dog trainer. Final clue/twist: When Columbo realizes that the dogs were trained to react violently when a trigger word is spoken, he has a long conversation with Mason, hoping Mason’s ego will compel him to use the word while they talk. This does happen. Columbo secretly recorded the conversation, and when the tape is played to the dogs they again react violently. Columbo figures out the word is "Rosebud". Columbo confronts Mason and provokes him by telling him of all the mistakes he made. Mason orders the dogs to attack, by saying "Rosebud" sharply and pointing to Columbo. However, the dogs play with Columbo instead of attacking him, as he had arranged to have them retrained by a dog behavioural specialist.
45	5	"The Conspirators"	Leo Penn	Suggested by the story by : Pat Robison; Teleplay by : Howard Berk	Clive Revill as Joe Devlin	Albert Paulsen as Vincent Pauley	May 13, 1978	93 min
Joe Devlin (Clive Revill) is a renowned Irish poet, author and raconteur. Along with his own family and the heads of O'Connell Industries, he is secretly a fundraiser and gunrunner for the Irish Republican Army. He raises money in Los Angeles for his radical cause through a charity ostensibly meant to help victims of terrorism. Devlin has a strong belief in honor. When he learns that Vincent Pauley (Albert Paulsen), the middle man in an arms deal, attempts to betray him, Devlin fatally shoots Pauley as a traitor. Devlin must evade Columbo, who is hot on his trail, and also to complete the gun-smuggling operation in time. Final clue/twist: Columbo discovers that a bottle of whiskey at the crime scene has the same glass markings that Devlin habitually makes when he drinks from a bottle. Because every diamond has a unique cutting habit, Devlin's ring, which he uses to mark his bottles, is proof of his presence at the crime scene. Devlin accepts that Columbo has caught him, and is only disturbed when at the last minute Columbo foils his gun-smuggling scheme: Columbo had realized the guns were not yet on a ship going out to Southampton, but were on a tugboat escorting the ship to sea. Columbo saw the tugboat had the colors of the O'Connell shipping line. This was the last episode of the Columbo series broadcast on the NBC television network. Columbo's last line is "This far, and no farther", words spoken by Devlin as he marked a whiskey bottle to determine how much he would drink in a session. These words were taken from a speech by the Irish Parliamentary Party (IPP) leader Charles Stuart Parnell, a 19th-century Irish politician and supporter of Home rule. The killer's name in the episode was taken from Joseph Devlin, a noted IPP politician early in the 20th century, who opposed the use of violence in the cause of nationalist politics.
