= Mustang! (film) =

1959 film by Tom Gries

- Directed by: Tom Gries
- Screenplay by: Tom Gries
- Based on: From the Book ("Capture of the Golden Stallion") (by Rutherford Montgomery)
- Produced by: Robert Arnell (as Sam X. Abarbanel)
- Starring: Jack Buetel
- Cinematography: William C. Thompson
- Edited by: Michael Pozen
- Music by: Raoul Kraushaar
- Production company: Eronel Productions
- Distributed by: United Artists
- Release date: March 15, 1959
- Running time: 73 minutes
- Country: United States
- Language: English

Mustang! is a 1959 American Western film directed by Tom Gries and starring Jack Buetel The film was made in 1955, when Champ Butler recorded the film's theme tune.

== Plot ==
In the hills and forest surrounding a horse-breeding ranch, an unbroken wild mustang has been a constant challenge to the ranch owner. To keep the animal from getting killed for being untamed, the ranch owner's son and daughter decide to try and see if they can get and win the trust of the mustang together.

== Cast ==
- Jack Buetel as Gable (as Jack Beutel)
- Madalyn Trahey as Nancy
- Stephen Keyes as Lou, Ranch Hand (as Steve Keyes)
- Milt Swift as Ranch Owner
- Bob Gilbert as Cowhand (as Robert Gilbert)
- Paul Spahn as Cowhand
- Max M. Gilford as Ranch Hand
- Autumn Moon as The Wild Mustang

== See also ==
- List of films about horses
- List of American films of 1959
