= The Glass House (1972 film) =

- Also known as: Truman Capote's The Glass House
- Genre: Drama
- Screenplay by: Tracy Keenan Wynn
- Story by: Truman Capote; Wyatt Cooper
- Directed by: Tom Gries
- Starring: Alan Alda; Vic Morrow
- Theme music composer: Billy Goldenberg
- Country of origin: United States
- Original language: English

Production
- Executive producer: Roger Gimbel
- Producers: Robert W. Christiansen; Rick Rosenberg
- Production locations: Salt Lake City, Utah
- Cinematography: Jules Brenner
- Editor: Gene Fowler Jr.
- Running time: 90 minutes
- Production company: Tomorrow Entertainment
- Budget: $375,000

Original release
- Network: CBS
- Release: February 4, 1972

Truman Capote's The Glass House is a 1972 American made-for-television drama film starring Alan Alda, Vic Morrow, and Clu Gulager, directed by Tom Gries. It originally aired on CBS on February 4, 1972.

== Plot ==
Professor Jonathon Paige accidentally kills a man during an argument and ends up convicted of manslaughter and sentenced to prison. He and young marijuana dealer Allan Campbell enter the prison the same day that idealistic veteran Brian Courtland starts his new position as a prison guard. The new prisoners discover that the prison is run by prison gangs, while the new guard discovers the corruption of the guards and warden. Paige is hired to work in the pharmacy and is pressured by Hugo Slocum to run drugs for Slocum's gang. Paige refuses to help Slocum and earns the respect of Lennox, a prisoner with a political mindset who is looking to reform the system. After being gang raped for refusing Slocum's advances, Allan kills himself by jumping from a high tier.

Sinclair, an inmate pressured by Slocum to run drugs through the pharmacy whose position was taken by Paige, gives Paige a book of records of corrupt transactions between Slocum and the guards to be published. Sinclair is shanked on the yard but his book cannot be found in his cell, so Slocum and his gang chase Paige through the prison. The riot alarm sounds, and most of the prisoners flee back to their cells, but Slocum remains, so Paige shoots him with a homemade weapon provided to him by Lennox and escapes through the empty guard booth. Outside he encounters Courtland, who shoots him by surprise. Courtland finds the book on Paige's body and refuses to hand it over when a corrupt guard demands it. Courtland notifies the warden of his findings and submits the book for evidence, but the warden denies knowledge of the book and asks him to sign the "official version" that the event was a race riot, excluding any information about corruption in the prison. Courtland refuses and leaves the prison, quitting his job.

== Cast ==
- Alan Alda as Jonathon Paige
- Vic Morrow as Hugo Slocum
- Clu Gulager as Brian Courtland
- Billy Dee Williams as Lennox
- Kristoffer Tabori as Allan Campbell
- Dean Jagger as Warden Auerbach
- Scott Hylands as Ajax
- Edward Bell as Sinclair
- Roy Jenson as Officer Brown
- Alan Vint as Bree
- Luke Askew as Bibleback
- Tony Mancini as Steve Berino
- G. Wood as Pagonis (uncredited)

== Production ==
Filming took place at Utah State Prison in Draper, Utah, 20 miles outside of Salt Lake City.

== Accolades ==
Tom Gries won a Primetime Emmy Award for Outstanding Directing for a Limited Series, Movie, or Dramatic Special in 1972 for directing this TV movie. The film also won the Golden Shell at the 1972 San Sebastián International Film Festival. The film was nominated for a Golden Globe Award for Best Limited or Anthology Series or Television Film but did not win.
