= Tom Gries =

American film and television director (1922–1977)

- Born: Thomas Stephen Gries; December 20, 1922; Chicago, Illinois, U.S.
- Died: January 3, 1977 (aged 54); Los Angeles, California, U.S.
- Education: Georgetown University
- Occupations: Director, writer, producer
- Spouse: Elizabeth S. Lobell (m. 1947, divorced) Mary Munday (m. 1955; div. 1972) Sally Gries (before 1977)
- Children: 2, including Jon
- Father: Muggsy Spanier (stepfather)
- Awards: See below

Thomas Stephen Gries (December 20, 1922 – January 3, 1977) was American film and television director, screenwriter, and producer. He was a two-time Primetime Emmy Award winner (out of seven total nominations), and a three-time Directors Guild of America Award nominee.

== Early life and education ==
Gries was born in Chicago, Illinois, the son of Jewish parents Ruth Marie (née Gluck), an actress and advertising copywriter, and Joseph Charles Gries. His mother later remarried to jazz musician Muggsy Spanier, who became stepfather to Ruth's sons. His brother, Charles Joseph Gries was a pop and jazz vocalist and pianist, better known as 'Buddy Charles'.

Gries was educated at the Loyola Academy and Georgetown University. He served in U.S. Marine Corps during World War II. He worked as a reporter for the Herald American and Variety, and as a talent agent, prior to his directing career.

== Career ==
=== Television ===
Gries began working in TV in the 1950s as a writer and director. His work can be seen on such popular programs as Bronco, Wanted: Dead or Alive, The Westerner, The Rifleman, Checkmate, Cain's Hundred, East Side/West Side, Route 66, Stoney Burke, Combat!, The Man from U.N.C.L.E., Honey West, I Spy, Mission: Impossible, and Batman among many others. Gries won Emmy Awards for his direction on East Side West Side in 1964 and The Glass House in 1972.

In 1966, Gries created the popular action-adventure series The Rat Patrol. Gries wrote and directed the pilot episode, "The Chase of Fire Raid." The 1966–68 series boasts 56 thirty-minute, color episodes produced over the span of its two-season run on ABC. The series focused on the oft-overlooked North African Campaign and episodes invariably pit the ragtag Rat Patrol — a four-man Allied force led by Christopher George as Sgt. Sam Troy — against the German Afrika Korps led by Captain Hans Dietrich, played by Eric Braeden (then still using his original name Hans Gudegast).

The most successful of his later projects was Helter Skelter, a 1976 TV movie based on Vincent Bugliosi's 1974 true-crime book detailing the crimes and trials of the notorious Charles Manson Family.

=== Film ===
In the cinema, Gries both wrote and directed the adventure film Serpent Island (1954) starring Sonny Tufts, and the Korean War film Hell's Horizon (1955) starring John Ireland. Between television directing gigs, Gries helmed Girl in the Woods, a 1958 drama starring Forrest Tucker and Barton MacLane.

Gries both wrote the screenplay and directed the 1959 Jack Buetel western Mustang! before concentrating his efforts exclusively on television for almost a decade. In a triumphant return to cinema, Gries wrote and directed what is generally acknowledged to be his masterpiece in either medium, the 1968 western Will Penny, which starred Charlton Heston in the title role. It was based on an episode of the TV series The Westerner that Gries wrote and directed in 1960, entitled "Line Camp".

Gries subsequently made two other films with Heston: the 1969 gridiron drama Number One and the 1970 drama The Hawaiians, which was based on James Michener's sprawling 1959 novel, Hawaii (not to be confused with the 1966 film based on a section of the same book). In 1969, Gries co-wrote and directed Jim Brown, Burt Reynolds, and Raquel Welch in the controversial western 100 Rifles.

In the early 1970s Gries directed a variety of films, from the 1970 Jason Robards and Katharine Ross May–December romance drama Fools to the 1971 science-fiction telefilm Earth II starring Gary Lockwood and Anthony Franciosa. In 1973, Gries directed the crime-thriller Lady Ice, which starred Donald Sutherland, Jennifer O'Neill, Robert Duvall and Eric Braeden. Gries, who had directed Charles Bronson in a 1961 episode of Cain's Hundred ("Dead Weight: Dave Braddock"), helmed two back-to-back Bronson films in 1975: Breakout and Breakheart Pass. Gries' 1970s work failed, however, to earn the critical acclaim that welcomed Will Penny.

His final film was The Greatest (1977), a biography of boxer Muhammad Ali (in which Ali also played himself).

== Assessment ==
FilmInk cited Gries as an "unsung auteur", calling him "not just a rock-solid craftsman, but also a director drawn to material that allowed him to explore themes obviously important to him. A fine purveyor of the western and the telemovie, Tom Gries was also a frequent collaborator of 1970s superstars Charlton Heston and Charles Bronson, directing some of their more interesting efforts."

== Personal life ==
Gries was married three times and four children. Three of his children went on to work in the film industry: actor and director Jon Gries (who appeared under the name Jon Francis Will Penny as a child), editor Cary Gries, and assistant director Peter Gries.

=== Death ===
During post-production on The Greatest, Gries collapsed and died of a heart attack while playing tennis in the Pacific Palisades area of Los Angeles. He was 54 years old. The film was dedicated to his memory.

== Filmography ==
=== Film ===
Year	Title	Functioned as			Notes	Ref.
Year	Title	Director	Writer	Producer	Notes	Ref.
1952	The Bushwhackers	No	Yes	No		
1953	Donovan's Brain	No	No	Yes		
1954	Hunters of the Deep	No	Yes	Yes	Documentary	
1954	Serpent Island	Yes	Yes	No		
1955	King Dinosaur	No	Yes	No		
1955	Hell's Horizon	Yes	Yes	No		
1958	Girl in the Woods	Yes	No	No		
1959	Mustang!	Yes	Yes	No	Co-directed with Peter Stephens	
1968	Will Penny	Yes	Yes	No		
1969	100 Rifles	Yes	Yes	No		
1969	Number One	Yes	No	No		
1970	The Hawaiians	Yes	No	No		
1970	Fools	Yes	No	No		
1972	Journey Through Rosebud	Yes	No	No		
1972	Lady Ice	Yes	No	Yes		
1975	Breakout	Yes	No	No		
1975	Breakheart Pass	Yes	No	No		
1977	The Greatest	Yes	No	No		

=== Television ===
Year	Title	Functioned as			
Year	Title	Creator	Director	Writer	Producer
1952	The Unexpected	No	No	Yes	No
1953	Boston Blackie	No	No	Yes	No
1955–56	TV Reader's Digest	No	Yes	Yes	No
1955–56	Science Fiction Theatre	No	Yes	No	No
1956	Chevron Hall of Stars	No	Yes	No	No
1956	Sky King	No	No	Yes	No
1956	Science Fiction Theatre	No	No	Yes	No
1956	Cavalcade of America	No	Yes	No	No
1956–57	Wire Service	No	Yes	No	No
1957	The Adventures of McGraw	No	Yes	No	No
1957	Alcoa Theatre	No	Yes	No	No
1957–58	Richard Diamond, Private Detective	No	Yes	Yes	No
1957–58	The Court of Last Resort	No	Yes	No	No
1958	State Trooper	No	Yes	No	No
1958	Tombstone Territory	No	Yes	Yes	No
1958	Target	No	Yes	No	No
1959	Bronco	No	No	Yes	No
1959–60	Johnny Ringo	No	Yes	Yes	No
1959–60	Wanted: Dead or Alive	No	No	Yes	No
1960	The Man and the Challenge	No	Yes	Yes	No
1960	The Westerner	No	Yes	Yes	No
1960	Lock Up	No	No	Yes	No
1960	The DuPont Show with June Allyson	No	No	Yes	No
1960	Zane Grey Theatre	No	Yes	No	No
1960	Bourbon Street Beat	No	No	Yes	No
1961	Dante	No	No	Yes	No
1961	The Rifleman	No	No	Yes	No
1961	The Barbara Stanwyck Show	No	No	Yes	No
1961	The Law and Mr Jones	No	Yes	No	No
1961	Adventures in Paradise	No	Yes	No	No
1961–62	Checkmate	No	Yes	No	No
1961–62	Cain's Hundred	No	Yes	No	No
1961–62	The Detectives	No	Yes	No	No
1962	Death Valley Days	No	No	Yes	No
1962	The Third Man	No	No	Yes	No
1962–63	Route 66	No	Yes	No	No
1962–63	Stoney Burke	No	Yes	No	No
1963	The Travels of Jamie McPheeters	No	Yes	No	No
1963–64	East Side/West Side	No	Yes	No	No
1963–65	Combat!	No	Yes	No	No
1964	The Reporter	No	Yes	Yes	Yes
1964	The Defenders	No	Yes	No	No
1964	The Doctors and the Nurses	No	Yes	No	No
1965	Bob Hope Presents the Chrysler Theatre	No	Yes	No	No
1965	For the People	No	Yes	No	No
1965	Kraft Suspense Theatre	No	Yes	No	No
1965	The Man from UNCLE	No	Yes	No	No
1965	The Trials of O'Brien	No	Yes	No	No
1965	Honey West	No	Yes	No	No
1966	Voyage to the Bottom of the Sea	No	Yes	No	No
1966	A Man Called Shenandoah	No	Yes	No	No
1966	Batman	No	Yes	No	No
1966	The Monroes	No	Yes	No	No
1966	Mission: Impossible	No	Yes	No	No
1966	The Felony Squad	No	Yes	No	No
1966	The Rounders	No	Yes	No	No
1966–68	The Rat Patrol	Yes	Yes	Yes	Yes
1967	I Spy	No	Yes	No	No
1967	Garrison's Gorillas	No	Yes	No	No
1971	Earth II	No	Yes	No	No
1972	The Glass House	No	Yes	No	No
1973	The Connection	No	Yes	No	No
1973	Call to Danger	No	Yes	No	No
1974	QB VII	No	Yes	No	No
1974	The Migrants	No	Yes	No	No
1974	The Healers	No	Yes	No	No
1976	Hunter	No	Yes	No	Yes
1976	Helter Skelter	No	Yes	No	Yes

==== Producer only ====
Year	Title	Notes
1972	Michael O'Hara the Fourth	TV movie

==== Other production credits ====
- Your Favorite Story (1953) - Production supervisor
- The Cisco Kid (1953) - Production supervisor

== Awards and nominations ==
Institution	Year	Category	Work	Result
Directors Guild of America	1973	Outstanding Directorial Achievement in Movies for Television and Limited Series	The Glass House	Nominated
Directors Guild of America	1975	Outstanding Directorial Achievement in Movies for Television and Limited Series	QB VII	Nominated
Directors Guild of America	1975	Outstanding Directorial Achievement in Movies for Television and Limited Series	Helter Skelter	Nominated
Primetime Emmy Awards	1964	Outstanding Directing for a Drama Series	East Side West Side ("Who Do You Kill?")	Won
Primetime Emmy Awards	1972	Outstanding Directing for a Limited or Anthology Series or Movie	The Glass House	Won
Primetime Emmy Awards	1974	Outstanding Directing for a Limited or Anthology Series or Movie	The Migrants	Nominated
Primetime Emmy Awards	1974	Outstanding Television Movie	The Migrants	Nominated
Primetime Emmy Awards	1975	Outstanding Directing for a Limited or Anthology Series or Movie	QB VII	Nominated
Primetime Emmy Awards	1977	Outstanding Directing for a Limited or Anthology Series or Movie	Helter Skelter	Nominated
San Sebastián International Film Festival	1972	Golden Shell	The Glass House	Won
Valladolid International Film Festival	1971	Golden Spike	Fools	Nominated
Valladolid International Film Festival	1971	Special Mention	Fools	Won
Western Heritage Awards	1969	Theatrical Motion Picture	Will Penny	Won
