= Columbo season 8 =

Season of television series

Columbo
- Season 8
- No. of episodes: 4

Release
- Original network: ABC
- Original release: February 6 – May 1, 1989

Season chronology
- ← Previous; Season 7 Next → Season 9

This is a list of episodes from the eighth season of Columbo, nearly 11 years after the seventh season's end, which aired as a part of The ABC Mystery Movie.

== Episodes ==
No. overall	No. in season	Title	Directed by	Written by	Murderer played by	Victim(s) played by	Original release date	Runtime
46	1	"Columbo Goes to the Guillotine"	Leo Penn	William Read Woodfield	Anthony Andrews as Elliott Blake	Anthony Zerbe as Max Dyson	February 6, 1989	88 min
Elliott Blake (Anthony Andrews) is a "psychic" who, with his girlfriend/partner in crime Dr. Paula Hall (Karen Austin), is attempting to scam U.S. military intelligence into hiring him to use his ESP abilities against the Soviets. Blake and Hall rig a test with a stock set of Zener cards, but the Army wants more proof of Blake's abilities. They bring in Max Dyson (Anthony Zerbe), a magician with a side job in exposing fake psychics. Dyson, who has never failed to expose frauds, comes up with a new test for Blake. Three Army officers drive to randomly selected areas and take pictures of whatever they see. Then they will attempt to transmit those images to Blake with their thoughts. To the surprise and delight of the Army officials, Blake passes the test. What they don't know, however, is that Blake and Dyson are old acquaintances who years prior were incarcerated in a Ugandan prison, and Dyson helped his old friend rig the test for old times' sake. However, Blake holds a grudge against Dyson for exposing his escape plans to the guards, which earned him an early release but resulted in three more years added to Blake's imprisonment. Seeking revenge, he traps Dyson in Dyson's own homemade guillotine, and decapitates him. Columbo now has to solve the crime before the government whisks Blake beyond his reach, changing his identity. Final clue/twist: Columbo tricks Blake into a confession and attempted murder by taunting him with a promise to investigate him for the murder for as long as it takes to bring him down. When Blake tries to kill Columbo with the guillotine, he confesses while he's pulling the plug. But because Columbo has rigged the guillotine, he is unharmed. This was the first episode broadcast on the ABC network. The character of Max Dyson is fashioned after James Randi, the real-life stage magician and escape artist who later became an investigator of purported paranormal phenomena, and who exposed frauds in the process.
47	2	"Murder, Smoke and Shadows"	James Frawley	Richard Alan Simmons	Fisher Stevens as Alex Brady	Jeff Perry as Leonard Fisher	February 27, 1989	90 min
Boy genius Hollywood director Alex Brady (Fisher Stevens), prior to becoming a success, made a 16mm movie during which a young woman, Jenny Fisher, was killed in a motorcycle accident. Brady and his cameraman conspired to pretend that the woman never made it to the filming, leading the official investigation to conclude it was an accidental death. Jenny's brother Leonard Fisher (Jeff Perry) shows up in Brady's office with a copy of a film that was left to him by Brady's recently deceased cameraman. Leonard vows to use the film to destroy Brady, who kills him, using one of his studio movie sets. Final clue/twist: When he realizes that Columbo is coming closer and closer to solving the murder, Brady hires two actresses to enact a scripted conversation in the studio commissary for Columbo to overhear, hoping it would misdirect him. Columbo is not fooled, noticing that one of the actresses was dressed as a nurse when there were no scenes filmed during the studio that day that required one. Columbo then beats Brady at his own game, using undercover cops to "play the part" of the commissary staff so they can overhear Brady trying to bribe his secretary to keep quiet. Molly Hagan co-stars as Alex Brady's girlfriend, Ruth Jernigan.
48	3	"Sex and the Married Detective"	James Frawley	Jerry Ludwig	Lindsay Crouse as Joan Allenby	Stephen Macht as David Kincaid	April 3, 1989	90 min
Sex therapist Dr. Joan Allenby (Lindsay Crouse) hosts a popular call-in radio show and has authored a best-selling self-help manual, The Courtesan Complex. She is also involved both professionally and personally with her business partner and boyfriend David Kincaid (Stephen Macht). That is, until late one night when Dr. Allenby makes an unexpected after-hours trip to her office and catches David in flagrante delicto with her assistant Cindy Galt (Julia Montgomery) in the therapy room. Dr. Allenby is incensed, and decides to kill David. To do so, she takes a page right out of her own book. She first disguises herself as a sexually aggressive, high-class prostitute named "Lisa", wearing a black wig and sexy black clothing, that she stashes in the women's bathroom of a fundraiser she's attending. During the fundraiser, she sneaks to the bathroom to change into her disguise. She then sneaks out in the disguise and goes over to a nearby bar where she's arranged for David to meet with her. Making sure to be seen, she tricks David into taking them both back to her clinic. Once there, she shoots him, then makes it look like the mysterious "lady in black" committed the crime. Final clue/twist: During their first meeting, Columbo notices that Allenby's new coat still has the price tag attached. He later makes the link connecting the new coat and the "lady in black" costume to the same store. He finds the tag in the trash and is able to contact the store where the salesperson who sold the wig to her was able to recognize Allenby from the photo of her in her book. In addition, the "lady in black" as the murder suspect, had been discussed and described vividly to Allenby repeatedly throughout the episode. Columbo had a policewoman dress exactly like the "lady in black" and block Allenby's path, so that there's no way Allenby could miss her, in the lobby of her clinic. Allenby looked shocked and confused, but never mentioned the encounter. The fact that Allenby did not immediately approach Columbo and say something like, "I think I've just seen her!" or "She's here!" was evidence that she knew that she herself was the "lady in black".
49	4	"Grand Deceptions"	Sam Wanamaker	Sy Salkowitz	Robert Foxworth as Frank Brailie	Andy Romano as Lester Keegan	May 1, 1989	90 min
Colonel Frank Brailie (Robert Foxworth) is running a paramilitary mercenary school owned by General Jack Padget (Stephen Elliott). Brailie is also having an affair with Padget's wife Jenny (Janet Eilber). Brailie is siphoning money from Padget's foundation into what he calls "The Special Projects Fund", which is secretly used to finance illegal dealings. The suspicious General asks an employee, Sgt. Major Lester Keegan (Andy Romano), to look into the matter. Keegan finds the evidence but decides to blackmail Brailie instead of reporting his findings. During a training exercise, occurring on the night of the General's birthday party, Brailie sneaks into the mercenary camp, wearing a ski mask, and stabs Keegan, then puts the body on a landmine that is detonated. He sneaks back to the General's estate and makes it look like he was assembling a diorama of the Battle of Gettysburg at the time. Final clue/twist: Columbo realized that a shipping box labeled as having contained books (which Brailie received earlier on the day of the murder) was too small to contain the number of books it was supposed to contain, and thus the box must have instead contained the toy soldiers for the diorama, and the books must have arrived in a shipment that arrived later (which Brailie claimed contained the toy soldiers). This meant that Brailie had swapped the labels on the boxes and had had enough time to set up the diorama over the course of the day, and therefore had no alibi for the time of the murder.
