= The Migrants =

1974 television film by Tom Gries

- Film poster
- Written by: Lanford Wilson
- Story by: Tennessee Williams
- Directed by: Tom Gries
- Starring: Cloris Leachman; Ron Howard; Sissy Spacek
- Composer: Billy Goldenberg
- Country of origin: United States
- Original language: English

Production
- Producer: Tom Gries
- Cinematography: Richard C. Kratina
- Editor: Bud S. Isaacs
- Running time: 90 minutes
- Production company: CBS Television Network

Original release
- Network: CBS
- Release: February 3, 1974

The Migrants is a 1974 American drama television film directed and produced by Tom Gries and written by Lanford Wilson, based on a story by Tennessee Williams. The film stars Cloris Leachman, Ron Howard, and Sissy Spacek. It received for six Primetime Emmy Award nominations, including Outstanding Special – Comedy or Drama and Best Lead Actress in a Drama for Leachman.

== Synopsis ==
A family of migratory farm workers travels the country performing seasonal work.

== Cast ==
- Cloris Leachman as Viola Barlow
- Ron Howard as Lyle Barlow
- Sissy Spacek as Wanda Trimpin
- Cindy Williams as Betty
- Ed Lauter as Mr. Barlow
- Lisa Lucas as Molly Barlow
- Mills Watson as Hec Campbell
- David Clennon as Tom Trimpin
- Dinah Englund as Billie Jean Barlow
- Brad Sullivan as Johnson
- Leon Russom as Doctor
- Claudia McNeil as Rose Daw
- Tom Rosqui as Father
- Dolph Sweet as Sheriff
- Mari Gorman as Miss Travers
- Wally Parnell as First Overseer
- George Castellini as Second Overseer
- Henry Newman as Beard
- Richard DeFeo as Diaz
- Rudolph Tillman as Mr. Daw
- Joseph Brady as Minister
- Bill Pope as Billy Dan
- Sol Weiner as Sheriff's Deputy
- Kathleen Garrison as Baby
- Suzanne Garrison as Baby #2

== Production ==
Filming took place in Vineland, New Jersey.

== Reception ==
New York Times reviewer Cyclops criticized the fact that many of the usual Tennessee Williams elements were missing. Howard Rosenberg of the Los Angeles Times, however, placed the movie on his list of the 30 best TV movies.

== Awards and nominations ==
Year	Award	Category	Nominee	Result
1974	26th Primetime Emmy Awards	Outstanding Special – Comedy or Drama	Tom Gries	Nominated
1974	26th Primetime Emmy Awards	Best Lead Actress in a Drama	Cloris Leachman	Nominated
1974	26th Primetime Emmy Awards	Best Directing in Drama – Single Program – Comedy or Drama	Tom Gries	Nominated
1974	26th Primetime Emmy Awards	Best Writing in Drama – Original Teleplay	Lanford Wilson	Nominated
1974	26th Primetime Emmy Awards	Best Music Composition – For a Special Program	Billy Goldenberg	Nominated
1974	26th Primetime Emmy Awards	Best Cinematography for Entertainment Programming – For a Special or Feature Length Program Made for Television	Richard C. Kratina	Nominated
