= Earth II =

1971 television film by Tom Gries

- Genre: Sci-fi
- Screenplay by: Allan Balter; William Read Woodfield
- Directed by: Tom Gries
- Starring: Gary Lockwood; Scott Hylands; Hari Rhodes
- Theme music composer: Lalo Schifrin
- Country of origin: United States
- Original language: English

Production
- Producers: Allan Balter; William Read Woodfield
- Cinematography: Michel Hugo
- Editor: Henry Berman
- Running time: 98 minutes
- Production companies: Wabe; MGM Television

Original release
- Network: ABC
- Release: November 28, 1971

Earth II is a 1971 pilot, aired November 28 (and released theatrically outside North America), for a television series about a colony established in orbit around the Earth. A WABE Production in association with Metro-Goldwyn-Mayer Television, it starred Gary Lockwood, Scott Hylands and Hari Rhodes. The film was written and produced by William Read Woodfield and Allan Balter, and directed by Tom Gries.

== Plot ==
Three men are launched from Cape Kennedy in a typical Apollo-style launch; a "Red Chinese" agent is killed in the water nearby before he can sabotage the rocket launch.

The President (Lew Ayres) of the United States announces that the three men and their ship will be the nucleus of a new nation, and asks Americans to turn their lights on that night to show support for the project. The astronauts take photos of the Earth's surface as they orbit, to be processed later to determine the level of public support for the idea within the conterminous 48 states. The results indicate widespread support for a new nation in outer space.

Several years later, a shuttle approaches a space station, a huge, rotating city known as Earth II, which houses thousands of residents who had previously emigrated from various nations on Earth. The station is equipped with technology which facilitates movement around the city and supplies residents with materials. There is a family aboard the shuttle—Frank, Lisa and Matt Karger – who are new immigrants to the colony.

Shortly after arrival, Earth II's administrators, including David Seville (Lockwood), become aware of a nuclear warhead in orbit that comes close to Earth II every few hours. The warhead was launched by the People's Republic of China. Earth II requests a meeting with PRC representatives through the UN (of which Earth II is a member nation); at the meeting, the PRC refuses to remove the weapon and threatens to detonate it if it is tampered with.

Earth II has a televised direct democracy process known as a "D&D"—Discussion and Decision. The newly arrived Frank Karger (Franciosa) initiates a D&D to decide on how to deal with the warhead. After some of the citizens, including Russian emigre Ilyana Kovalefskii (Inga Swenson) make their statements (the logic of which is noted on-screen by a computer), the vote is to act.

Two men, including Ilyana's husband Anton (Edward Bell) go out in a tug to deactivate the warhead, but Anton receives an electric shock when the Chinese activate the weapon. The weapon does not explode, however, as Anton had already cut several wires in the arming device. The tug operator rescues the technician, discards his tool caddies, secures the bomb and brings both back to Earth II. Ilyana is told that Anton will be disabled for life as a result of his injuries unless surgery is attempted. Ilyana approves the surgery.

Meanwhile, Lisa Karger (Hartley) doesn't want the bomb aboard, and is alarmed at Frank's intent to initiate a D&D on Earth II maintaining its own nuclear weapons. When told that one way to dispose of the bomb is to fire it at the Sun, Lisa blows the hatch cover on the holding bay, waits for the Sun to come into the view, and launches the bomb at it. The Earth's gravitational pull is greater however, the bomb falls toward the Earth and will detonate over the Great Lakes region. Lisa's activity in the launch bay is noticed during the second D&D debate.

Ilyana observes the operation on her husband—in an operating room with medical personnel standing on both the floor and ceiling—sadly, Anton abruptly dies immediately thereafter.

The tug operator retrieves the warhead, but not before the warhead's casing has disintegrated in the Earth's atmosphere. The bomb is brought back and put into the same holding bay. Station rotation is slowed as much as possible while a crew works to permanently deactivate the bomb. They must deal with uncertainty about the circuitry, with a computer being used to rate probabilities as they proceed.

The city is still rotating enough to bring the Sun into view through the opening and the temperature is rising, threatening to melt safeties and detonate the bomb. A pilot takes a tug out and puts its nose against one of the main struts of the city, then fires its engines to stop rotation altogether. With the Sun's light partly shining into the holding bay, the temperature is at a crucial level. The technicians find melted metal that makes it necessary to drill in order to remove some components.

The disarming is completed; the rotation of the city is restarted. Frank Karger relents and is no longer intent to go ahead with the D&D on Earth II's nuclear weapons status, and the bomb is properly launched toward the Sun for disposal.

== Cast ==
- Gary Lockwood as David Seville
- Scott Hylands as Jim Capa
- Hari Rhodes as Dr. Loren Huxley
- Anthony Franciosa as Frank Karger (as Tony Franciosa)
- Mariette Hartley as Lisa Karger
- Gary Merrill as Walter Dietrich
- Inga Swenson as Ilyana Kovalefskii
- Edward Michael Bell as Anton Kovalefskii (as Edward Bell)
- Lew Ayres as President Charles Carter Durant
- Brian Dewey as Matt Karger
- Diana Webster as Hannah Young
- Bart Burns as Steiner
- John Carter as Hazlitt
- Herbert Nelson as Chairman
- Serge Tschernisch as Russian
- Vince Cannon as Technician
- David Sachs as Surgeon
- Bob Hoy as West

== See also ==
- List of films featuring space stations

== Notes ==
Very shortly after the movie was produced, and 34 days before it was broadcast, the United Nations voted October 25, 1971 to expel the representatives of the Taiwan-based Republic of China (an original member since 1945) and admit the Beijing-based representatives of the People's Republic of China (founded 1949) in its place. Thus, the movie was geopolitically outdated when broadcast.

In a 1998 interview with Sci-Fi Channel Magazine promoting the 30th anniversary of 2001: A Space Odyssey, Gary Lockwood stated that he hated working on the Earth II production, due to its complexity.

The map used in the control center is a Dymaxion Map, designed by R. Buckminster Fuller, who was also listed in the credits as "Technical Advisor for Earth."

In 2010, Film Score Monthly released Lalo Schifrin's score as part of their five-disc collection of MGM television music, TV Omnibus: Volume One (1962–1976).
