= Girl in the Woods =

1958 film by Tom Gries

- Directed by: Tom Gries
- Written by: Oliver Crawford; Marcy Klauber
- Produced by: Marcy Klauber; Harry L. Mandell
- Starring: Forrest Tucker
- Cinematography: Jack A. Marta
- Edited by: Douglas Stewart
- Music by: Albert Glasser
- Production companies: AB-PT Pictures
- Distributed by: Republic Pictures
- Release date: June 1, 1958
- Running time: 71 minutes
- Country: United States
- Language: English

Girl in the Woods is a 1958 American drama film directed by Tom Gries. It stars Forrest Tucker and Margaret Hayes.

== Plot ==
Steve and Bell Cory arrive in timber country, where Bell is eager to begin a new life, tired of moving from place to place and weary of Steve's gambling habit. A lumber baron, Whitlock, has recently laid claim to land belonging to another man, who begins poaching logs from him.

Whitlock's foreman, Big Jim, offers a job to Steve, who must fend off romantic advances from Jim's young and restless daughter, Sonda. In a snit over Steve's rejection, Sonda helps point out the whereabout of the man Whitlock's after, who is then shot, with Steve being blamed. Bell is furious with Steve's behavior until finally realizing that none of it has been his fault.

== Cast ==
- Forrest Tucker as Steve Cory
- Margaret Hayes as Bell Cory
- Barton MacLane as Big Jim
- Diana Francis as Sonda
- Murvyn Vye as Whitlock
