= Fools (1970 film) =

1970 film by Tom Gries

- Directed by: Tom Gries
- Written by: Robert Rudelson
- Produced by: Henri Bollinger; Pat Rooney; Robert Yamin
- Starring: Jason Robards; Katharine Ross
- Cinematography: Michel Hugo
- Edited by: Byron Brandt
- Music by: Shorty Rogers; Kenny Rogers and the First Edition; Mimi Fariña
- Production company: Translor Films
- Distributed by: Cinerama Releasing Corporation
- Release date: 23 December 1970
- Running time: 93 min.
- Country: United States
- Language: English
- Budget: $900,000

Fools is a 1970 drama film directed by Tom Gries. It stars Katharine Ross and Jason Robards.

== Plot ==
Aging actor Matthew South falls in love with a much younger married woman, the wife of his attorney.

== Cast ==
- Katharine Ross as Anais Appleton
- Jason Robards as Matthew South
- Scott Hylands as David Appleton
- Roy Jenson as Man in park
- Mark Bramhall as Man in park

== Reception ==
The film received mostly negative reviews. In a particularly scathing review in the Chicago Sun-Times, Roger Ebert wrote:

How can I possibly describe how awful Fools is, and in how many different ways? The task approaches impossibility. The only way to fully understand how transcendently bad this movie is would be to see it for yourself — an extreme measure I hope, for your sake, you'll avoid. Let me just sort of hint at the depth of my feeling by saying Fools is the worst movie in 1971, a statement that springs forth with serene confidence even though here it is only February. Happy Valentine's Day, by the way.
