= Daryl Duke =

Canadian film and television director (1929–2006)

- Born: 8 March 1929; Vancouver, British Columbia, Canada
- Died: 21 October 2006 (aged 77); West Vancouver, British Columbia, Canada
- Occupation: Film director
- Years active: 1952–1992
- Notable work: The Silent Partner
- Television: This Hour Has Seven Days; The Thorn Birds

Daryl Duke (8 March 1929 – 21 October 2006) was a Canadian film and television director.

== Biography ==
Duke was born at Vancouver, British Columbia, where he became one of CBC Television's earliest regional producers. His career continued with CBC in Toronto producing such series as This Hour Has Seven Days, then in the United States for major television networks and studios there.

In 1977, he won the Canadian Film Award for best Director for his surprise hit The Silent Partner.

His significant achievement in television was directing the Emmy Award winning miniseries The Thorn Birds. Duke was also among those responsible for the creation of CKVU-TV in Vancouver which is today part of the Citytv franchise. Noteworthy is that he produced and directed early Bob Dylan "song films," black and white vignettes that were the forerunners of today's music videos. He was inducted to the BC Entertainment Hall of Fame and Star Walk in 1997.

Duke died in West Vancouver, British Columbia, in 2006 due to pulmonary fibrosis.

== Filmography ==
=== Cinema ===
- 1972: Payday
- 1978: The Silent Partner
- 1982: Hard Feelings
- 1986: Tai-Pan

=== Television ===
- 1964: This Hour Has Seven Days
- 1966: Wojeck (1 episode)
- 1969: The Bold Ones: The New Doctors (3 episodes)
- 1970: Night Gallery (1 episode)
- 1970–71: The Psychiatrist (pilot, 1 episode)
  - Children of the Lotus Eater AKA God Bless the Children
  - Such Civil War in My Love and Hate
- 1972: Banacek (1 episode)
- 1972: Cool Million (episode)
- 1972: Ghost Story (2 episodes)
- 1973: I Heard the Owl Call My Name
- 1973: The President's Plane Is Missing
- 1974: Harry O (2-part episodes)
- 1975: A Cry for Help
- 1975: They Only Come Out at Night
- 1976: Griffin and Phoenix
- 1979: The Return of Charlie Chan
- 1983: The Thorn Birds (miniseries)
- 1985: Florence Nightingale
- 1989: When We Were Young
- 1990-1991: Columbo
  - Columbo Cries Wolf
  - Caution: Murder Can Be Hazardous to Your Health
- 1992: Fatal Memories

== Awards and recognition ==
- 1971: winner, Primetime Emmy Award, Outstanding Directorial Achievement in a Drama, episode of The Bold Ones: The Senator
- 2004: winner, John Drainie Award
