= Robert Van Scoyk =

American screenwriter

- Born: Robert Elseworth Van Scoyk; January 13, 1928; Dayton, Ohio, U.S.
- Died: August 23, 2002 (aged 74); Los Angeles, California, U.S.
- Other names: Bob Van Scoyk, Rovert Van Scoyk
- Occupations: Writer; producer; story editor
- Years active: 1940s–1990s
- Spouse(s): 1. Patricia Schauder, ?- 1971 (her death); 2. Leona Plotkin, ?-2002 (his death)
- Children: Robert Van Scoyk, Andrew Van Scoyk, and Matt Tyrnauer, film director and journalist

Robert Van Scoyk (January 13, 1928 – August 23, 2002) was an American television writer, producer and story editor active during the Golden Age of Television from the late 1940s until the late 1990s.

Beginning in New York and moving to Los Angeles in the 1960s, his credits included The Virginian, Banacek, Young Maverick, Flying High, Rafferty, Ellery Queen and Murder, She Wrote.

In 1979, Robert Van Scoyk received an Edgar Allan Poe Award for the Columbo episode Murder Under Glass.

== Life and career ==
Born in Dayton, Ohio, to Robert Van Scoyk and Gertrude Wardlow, he wrote for local radio before joining the United States Army Air Corps during the last months of World War II. After the war he attended Columbia and New York Universities and began his career in television by working as a pageboy at NBC studios.

He married Patricia Schauder and they had two sons. She died in 1971 at age 42 and he later married Leona Plotkin.

=== New York ===
At that time he was also writing a column for the Dayton Daily News about life as a struggling radio and TV writer in Manhattan. New York gossip columnist Earl Wilson helped his career by regularly recounting van Scoyk's adventures in his own column. Van Scoyk's first writing credit, together with partner Allan Manings, was for The Imogene Coca Show.

His break came when he wrote a script for NBC's The New Faces, a revue show produced by the NBC pages in the late 1940s. He went on to write for The Ann Sothern Show, The Imogene Coca Show, U.S. Steel Hour, Philco Theatre, Armstrong Circle Theater and Kraft Theatre, as well as Ivanhoe and The Betty Hutton Show.

=== Los Angeles ===
In the late 1960s, van Scoyk moved to Los Angeles where he wrote, adapted, produced and story edited a wide range of TV series and made-for-television movies, equally at home with comedy, Western, musical comedy, melodrama, medical drama, mystery and detective genres.

In 1979, van Scoyk received an Edgar Allan Poe Award from the Mystery Writers of America for the Columbo episode Murder Under Glass, starring Peter Falk and Louis Jourdan.

He is perhaps best remembered for his involvement as writer, producer, executive producer and/or story editor for such shows as The Virginian, Banacek, Young Maverick, Flying High, Rafferty, Ellery Queen and, for the 12 years of its 1984–1996 run and after, Murder, She Wrote. In fact for his work on this show he was profiled for the book Successful Scriptwriting, by Jurgen Wolff and Kerry Cox.

== Death ==
Robert van Scoyk died in Los Angeles, California on August 23, 2002, of complication from diabetes. He was 74.

He was survived by his wife of 30 years, Leona Plotkin Van Scoyk, sons Robert, Andy, and Matt Tyrnauer, his father Robert, and sister Lois.

== Legacy ==
The Robert Van Scoyk Papers are listed at the Online Archive of California. In addition to produce television scripts, treatments, and ideas for produced and unproduced TV shows, the collection also contains personal and professional scrapbooks, photos, correspondence, illustrations, and song lyrics.Online Archive of California

== Additional credits (partial) ==
(Also credited as Bob van Scoyk and Rovert van Scoyk.)

TV adaptation of Kiss Me, Kate (1968) starring Robert Goulet and Carol Lawrence for ABC
Love, Sidney starring Tony Randall
All's Fair starring Richard Crenna and Bernadette Peters

The Apple Dumpling Gang

Armstrong Circle Theatre

Baby Makes Five

Baretta

Cannon

Car 54, Where Are You?

The Cosby Mysteries

The Cosby Show

The Defenders

The Doctors and the Nurses

East Side/West Side

Flying High

Gavilan

Glitter

Hernandez

Ironside

Magnum, P.I.

Mama Malone

The Many Loves of Dobie Gillis

Marcus Welby, M.D.

Partners in Crime

Rafferty

Sarge

Trauma Center

Wonder Woman

His other writings were represented in anthologies including Best Short Stories of 1958, in sketches for a 1956 Broadway show called The Littlest Revue (OAC), and in contributions to periodicals including Ellery Queen's Mystery Magazine and The Humanist.
