= Shera Danese =

American actress

- Born: October 9, 1949 (age 76)
- Years active: 1975–2010
- Spouse: Peter Falk (m. 1977; died 2011)

Shera Danese is an American actress and the widow of actor Peter Falk, the star of Columbo. Danese appeared alongside Falk on Columbo in several supporting roles and holds the distinction of making the most appearances of any actress in the series.

== Biography ==
=== Life and career ===
Danese was the 1970 Miss Pennsylvania World.

Her acting career began in 1975 playing the part of Kitty in an episode of the television series Medical Story (credited as Sherry Danese). She subsequently guest-starred in other series during the 1970s, with appearances in One Day at a Time, Serpico, Baretta, Three's Company, Kojak, Family, Hart to Hart, Starsky and Hutch, and Charlie's Angels.

In one of her few movie roles, Danese starred with Tom Cruise and Rebecca De Mornay in Risky Business (1983), playing a prostitute named Vicki. In 2005, she appeared alongside her husband Peter Falk in the movie Checking Out.

=== Columbo (1976–1997) ===
Danese had major supporting roles in six episodes of the television series Columbo, appearing alongside her husband Peter Falk (who starred as Lieutenant Columbo), in "Fade in to Murder" (1976), "Murder Under Glass" (1978), "Murder, a Self Portrait" (1989), "Columbo and the Murder of a Rock Star" (1991), "Undercover" (1994), and "A Trace of Murder" (1997). Although she played the killer only once, Danese has the distinction of having appeared in more episodes of the series than any other actress.

=== Ace Crawford, Private Eye ===
In 1983 she appeared in the comedy series Ace Crawford, Private Eye alongside Tim Conway. She starred as Luana, a singer at The Shanty who lusted after Crawford.

=== Personal life ===
Danese met Peter Falk on the set of the movie Mikey and Nicky.

Danese was Falk's conservator and, according to his daughter Catherine, prevented some of his family members from visiting him, did not notify them of major changes in his condition, and did not notify them of his death and funeral arrangements. Catherine Falk later encouraged the passage of legislation, called Peter Falk's Law, that provides guidelines that guardians and conservators for an incapacitated person must comply with regarding visitation rights and notice of death. As of 2016 more than ten states had enacted such laws.

== Filmography ==
Year	Title	Role	Notes
1975	Medical Story	Kitty	Season 1 Episode 5: "An Air Full of Death"
1976	One Day at a Time	Miss Hefley	Season 1 Episode 4: "How to Succeed Without Trying"
1976	Having Babies	Kristy Potter	Television movie
1976–1977	Serpico	Mildred / Jan	2 episodes
1976–1977	Three's Company	Barmaid	2 episodes
1976–1978	Columbo "Fade in to Murder"	Molly / Eve Plummer	2 episodes
1977	Baretta	Jill	Season 3 Episode 16: "The Reunion"
1977	The Feather and Father Gang	Photo Assistant	Season 1 Episode 10: "Murder at F-Stop 11"
1977	New York, New York	Doyle's Girl in Major Chord	
1977	Kojak	Sally Centorini	Season 5 Episode 12: "I Could Kill My Wife's Lawyer"
1977–1978	Starsky & Hutch	Judith Coppet / Nicole Monk	2 episodes
1978	Fame	Lucia	Television movie
1978–1979	Family	Bambi	2 episodes
1979	Charlie's Angels	Connie	Season 3 Episode 15: "Disco Angels"
1979	The Love Tapes	Susan	Television movie
1979	Hart to Hart	Carla	Season 1 Episode 1: "Hit Jennifer Hart"
1982	Million Dollar Infield	Bunny Wahl	Television movie
1983	Your Place... or Mine		Television movie
1983	Ace Crawford, Private Eye	Luana	Series regular
1983	Risky Business	Vicki	
1983	Sparkling Cyanide	Christine Shannon	Television movie
1984	Maggie Briggs	Connie Piscipoli	3 episodes
1984	Brothers	Pepe	Season 1 Episode 10: "Standards and Practices"
1985	Detective in the House	Gina	Season 1 Episode 7: "Gelt by Association"
1985	The Ladies Club	Eva	
1987	Baby Boom	Cloak Room Attendant	
1989	Midnight Caller	Jo	Season 1 Episode 10: "Fathers and Sins"
1989	Columbo: "Murder, A Self Portrait"	Vanessa Barsini	Television movie
1989	Mulberry Street	Joanne Savoia	Television movie
1991	Columbo: "Columbo and the Murder of a Rock Star"	Trish Fairbanks	Television movie
1992	Unbecoming Age	Letty	
1994	Columbo: "Undercover"	Geraldine Ferguson	Television movie
1997	Columbo: "A Trace of Murder"	Cathleen Calvert	Television movie
2000	Enemies of Laughter	Helen	
2002	John Q	Wife of Heart Transplant Patient	
2002	Who's Your Daddy?	Honey Mack	Video
2005	Checking Out	Rhonda Applebaum	
2006	Alpha Dog	Abby	
2010	Cold Case	Lana Parker '10	Season 7 Episode 12: "The Runaway Bunny"
