= William Woodfield =

American photographer and screenwriter (1928–2001)

- Born: William Read Woodfield; January 21, 1928; San Francisco, California, United States
- Died: November 24, 2001 (aged 73); Los Angeles, California
- Occupations: Photographer, television producer and screenwriter
- Spouse: Lili (Lily) Woodfield

William Read "Billy" Woodfield (January 21, 1928 – November 24, 2001) was an American photographer, television screenwriter, and producer who took black-and-white photographs of American screen actors. He also wrote the screenplay to the Hypnotic Eye (1960).

== Career ==
=== Publishing ===
In 1946 Woodfield began publishing Magicana, a trade paper for magicians. In 1948 his newsletter became a regular column in Genii magazine. He would continue writing the column until 1949, eventually shifting his focus to photography. In 1961, Woodfield co-authored The Ninth Life with Martin Machlin, documenting the infamous Caryl Chessman murder trial and execution. He would continue writing and publishing literature into the 1980s.

=== Photography ===
Working for Globe Photos, Woodfield's began taking celebrity photographs which began appearing in publications as early as 1957, photographing Natalie Wood in 1959 and Elizabeth Taylor for Life magazine. Woodfield's photographs accompanied Peter Ustinov's writing in Ustinov's Diplomats. In 1968, Woodfield published The Execution, his first solo written work.

In 1962 Woodfield—along with Lawrence Schiller and Jimmy Mitchell—gained fame when Marilyn Monroe extended an invitation to a photo shoot on a closed set at the Twentieth Century Fox studio lot. The publicity shoot took place in the swimming pool that was to be used in what would have been her final film Something's Got To Give.

=== Television ===
In the 1960s and 1970s, Woodfield would team with writer/producer Allan Balter to earn numerous awards for work in television. The team was nominated numerous times. As a screenwriter, Woodfield's award nominations included a Writers Guild of America Award for Best Screenplay – Episodic Drama in 1966 for Mission: Impossible; winning the Primetime Emmy Award for Outstanding Writing for a Drama Series in 1968 as a writer for Mission: Impossible; and earning another Primetime Emmy Award nomination in 1971 for Outstanding Writing Achievement in Drama credited with Original Teleplay for the short-lived 1970 NBC series San Francisco International Airport.

Woodfield and Balter were credited with opening up Mission: Impossible's story lines, which had previously been physical problems to solve (break into a prison, uncover a hidden message), by having the agents play grand-scale confidence games on the mission targets, to misdirect and manipulate them. "Billy Woodfield, a con devotee and self-described 'apprentice cheat,' was the prime mover behind the IMF's transformation into con artists. The approach had great story potential, gave the series its own identity, and helped make Mission a hit." He also wrote episodes of Columbo including episodes that featured magicians.

Woodfield died of heart failure in Los Angeles in 2001.

== Filmography ==
- 1965 Voyage to the Bottom of the Sea (TV series) Writer
- 1967 Mission: Impossible Writer, Producer
- 1968 Mission: Impossible Writer, Producer; Lost in Space Writer
- 1969 Mission: Impossible Writer, Producer
- 1969 Mission: Impossible vs. the Mob Writer
- 1971 San Francisco International Airport (TV series) Writer, Producer
- 1972 Earth II (TV pilot) Writer, Producer
- 1974 Shaft (TV series) Writer, Producer
