= New York Confidential =

New York Confidential may refer to:

- New York Confidential (book), a 1948 non-fiction book by Jack Lait and Lee Mortimer
  - New York Confidential (film), a 1955 film adaptation
  - New York Confidential (TV series), a 1958 TV series adaptation
