= Peter Falk =

American actor (1927–2011)

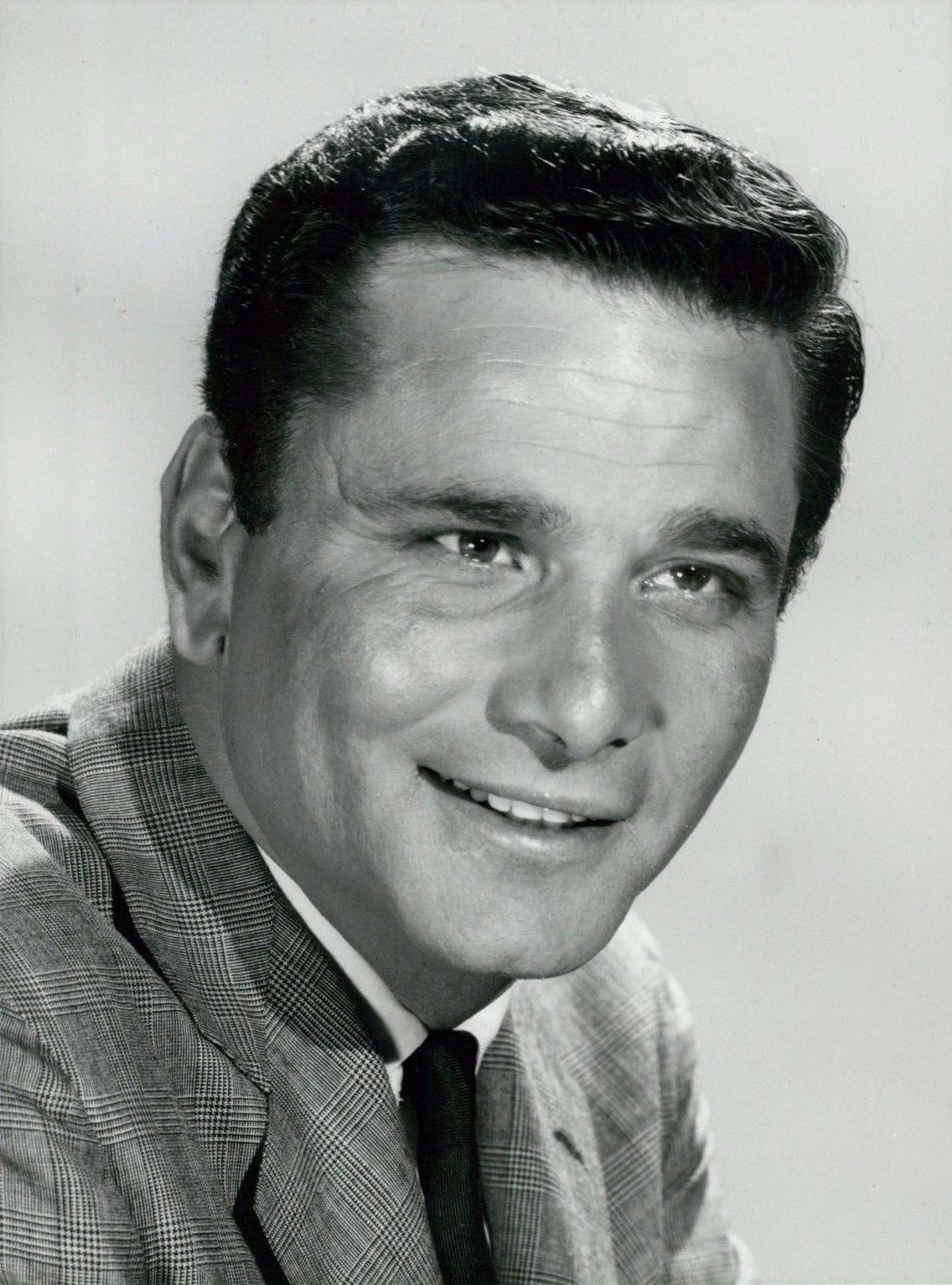
- Falk in 1967
- Born: Peter Michael Falk; September 16, 1927; New York City, U.S.
- Died: June 23, 2011 (aged 83); Beverly Hills, California, U.S.
- Resting place: Westwood Village Memorial Park Cemetery
- Education: Hamilton College; New School (BA); Syracuse University (MPA)
- Occupations: Actor; author
- Years active: 1956–2009
- Known for: Columbo; The In-Laws; Murder, Inc.; Pocketful of Miracles; The Price of Tomatoes
- Spouses: Alyce Mayo (m. 1960; div. 1976); Shera Danese (m. 1977)
- Children: 2
- Awards: Hollywood Walk of Fame

Peter Michael Falk (September 16, 1927 – June 23, 2011) was an American actor. He is best known for playing the title character Lieutenant Columbo on the NBC/ABC series Columbo (1968–1978, 1989–2003), for which he won four Primetime Emmy Awards (1972, 1975, 1976, 1990) and a Golden Globe Award (1973). In 1996, TV Guide ranked Falk No. 21 on its 50 Greatest TV Stars of All Time list. He received a posthumous star on the Hollywood Walk of Fame in 2013.

He first starred as Columbo in two 2-hour "World Premiere" TV pilots; the first with Gene Barry in 1968 and the second with Lee Grant in 1971. The show then aired as part of The NBC Mystery Movie series from 1971 to 1978, and again on ABC from 1989 to 2003.

Falk was twice nominated for the Academy Award for Best Supporting Actor, for Murder, Inc. (1960) and Pocketful of Miracles (1961), and won his first Emmy Award in 1962 for ”The Price Of Tomatoes” opposite Inger Stevens on The Dick Powell Theatre. He was the first actor to be nominated for an Academy Award and an Emmy Award in the same year, achieving the feat twice (1961 and 1962). He went on to appear in such films as It's a Mad, Mad, Mad, Mad World (1963), alongside Frank Sinatra in Robin and the 7 Hoods (1964), The Great Race (1965), Anzio (1968), Murder by Death (1976), The Cheap Detective (1978), The Brink's Job (1978), The In-Laws (1979), The Princess Bride (1987), Wings of Desire (1987), The Player (1992), and Next (2007), as well as many television guest roles.

Falk collaborated with filmmaker, actor, and personal friend John Cassavetes, acting in films such as Husbands (1970), A Woman Under the Influence (1974), Big Trouble (1986), Elaine May's Mikey and Nicky (1976) and the Columbo episode "Étude in Black" (1972). He cameoed as a theatergoer in Cassavetes' 1977 film Opening Night.

== Early life ==
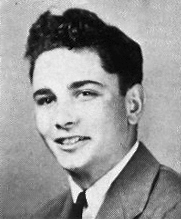
Falk as a senior in high school, 1945

Born in Manhattan, New York City, Falk was the son of Michael Peter Falk (1898–1981), owner of a clothing and dry goods store, and his wife, Madeline (née Hochhauser, 1904–2001). Both of his parents were Jewish.

Falk's right eye was surgically removed when he was three because of a retinoblastoma. (Note: This fact is alluded to in the 1997 Columbo episode "A Trace of Murder" (Series 13, episode 2), where Detective Columbo invites a colleague to help interview a suspect, stating, "three eyes are better than one".) He wore an artificial eye for most of his life. The artificial eye was the cause of his trademark squint. Despite this limitation, as a boy he participated in team sports, mainly baseball and basketball. In a 1997 interview in Cigar Aficionado magazine with Arthur Marx, Falk said:

I remember once in high school the umpire called me out at third base when I was sure I was safe. I got so mad I took out my glass eye, handed it to him and said, "Try this." I got such a laugh you wouldn't believe.

Falk's first stage appearance was at age 12 in The Pirates of Penzance at Camp High Point in upstate New York, where one of his camp counselors was Ross Martin. (Note: They later acted together in The Great Race and the Columbo episode "Suitable For Framing".) Falk attended Ossining High School in Westchester County, New York, where he was a star athlete and president of his senior class. He graduated in 1945.

Falk briefly attended Hamilton College in Clinton, New York. He then tried to join the armed services, as World War II was drawing to a close. Rejected because of his missing eye, he joined the United States Merchant Marine and served as a cook and mess boy. Falk said of the experience in 1997: "There they don't care if you're blind or not. The only one on a ship who has to see is the captain. And in the case of the Titanic, he couldn't see very well, either." Falk recalled in his autobiography:

A year on the water was enough for me, so I returned to college. I didn't stay long. Too itchy. What to do next? I signed up to go to Israel to fight in the war on its attack on Egypt. I wasn't passionate about Israel, I wasn't passionate about Egypt—I just wanted more excitement ... I got assigned a ship and departure date but the war was over before the ship ever sailed.

After a year and a half in the Merchant Marine, Falk returned to Hamilton College and also attended the University of Wisconsin. He transferred to The New School for Social Research in New York City, which awarded him a bachelor's degree in literature and political science in 1951.

Falk traveled in and around postwar Europe and worked rebuilding a railway in Yugoslavia for six months. He returned to New York, enrolling at Syracuse University, but he recalled in his 2006 memoir, Just One More Thing, that he was unsure what he wanted to do with his life for years after leaving high school. Falk obtained a Master of Public Administration degree at the Maxwell School of Syracuse University in 1953. The program was designed to train civil servants for the federal government, a career that Falk said in his memoir he had "no interest in and no aptitude for".

== Career ==
=== Early career ===
Falk applied for a job with the CIA, but he was rejected because of his membership in the Marine Cooks and Stewards Union while serving in the Merchant Marine, even though he was required to join and was not active in the union (which had been under fire for communist leanings). He then became a management analyst with the Connecticut State Budget Bureau in Hartford. In 1997, Falk characterized his Hartford job as "efficiency expert": "I was such an efficiency expert that the first morning on the job, I couldn't find the building where I was to report for work. Naturally, I was late, which I always was in those days, but ironically it was my tendency never to be on time that got me started as a professional actor."

=== Stage career ===
While working in Hartford, Falk joined a community theater group called the Mark Twain Masquers, where he performed in plays that included The Caine Mutiny Court-Martial, The Crucible, and The Country Girl by Clifford Odets. Falk also studied with Eva Le Gallienne, who was giving an acting class at the White Barn Theatre in Westport, Connecticut. Falk later recalled how he "lied his way" into the class, which was for professional actors. He drove down to Westport from Hartford every Wednesday, when the classes were held, and was usually late. In his 1997 interview with Arthur Marx in Cigar Aficionado Magazine, Falk said of Le Gallienne: "One evening when I arrived late, she looked at me and asked, 'Young man, why are you always late?' and I said, 'I have to drive down from Hartford.'" She looked down her nose and said, "What do you do in Hartford? There's no theater there. How do you make a living acting?" Falk confessed he was not a professional actor. According to him Le Gallienne looked at him sternly and said: "Well, you should be." He drove back to Hartford and quit his job. Falk stayed with the Le Gallienne theater company for a few months more, and obtained a letter of recommendation from Le Gallienne to an agent at the William Morris Agency in New York. In 1956, he left his job with the Budget Bureau and moved to Greenwich Village to pursue an acting career.

Falk's first New York stage role was in an off-Broadway production of Molière's Don Juan at the Fourth Street Theatre that closed after its only performance on January 3, 1956. Falk played the second lead, Sganarelle. His next theater role proved far better for his career. In May, he appeared as Rocky Pioggi at Circle in the Square in a revival of The Iceman Cometh directed by Jose Quintero, with Jason Robards playing the lead role of Theodore "Hickey" Hickman.

Later in 1956, Falk made his Broadway debut, appearing in Alexander Ostrovsky's Diary of a Scoundrel. As the year came to an end, he appeared again on Broadway as an English soldier in Shaw's Saint Joan with Siobhán McKenna. Falk continued to act in summer stock theater productions, including Arnold Schulman's A Hole in the Head at the Colonie Summer Theatre (near Albany, NY) in July 1962; it starred Priscilla Morrill.

In 1972, Falk appeared in Broadway's The Prisoner of Second Avenue. According to film historian Ephraim Katz: "His characters derive added authenticity from his squinty gaze, the result of the loss of an eye..." However, this production caused Falk a great deal of stress, both on and offstage. He struggled with memorizing a short speech, spending hours trying to memorize three lines. The next day at rehearsal, he reported behaving strangely and feeling a tingling sensation in his neck. This caught the attention of a stage manager, who told him to go "take a Valium". Only later did Falk realize he was having an anxiety attack. He would not go on to perform in any other plays, citing both this incident and his preference for acting in film and television productions.

=== Early films ===
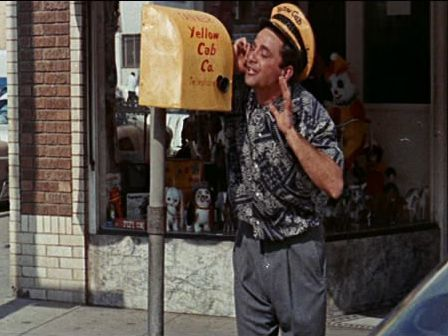
Peter Falk in It's a Mad, Mad, Mad, Mad World (1963)

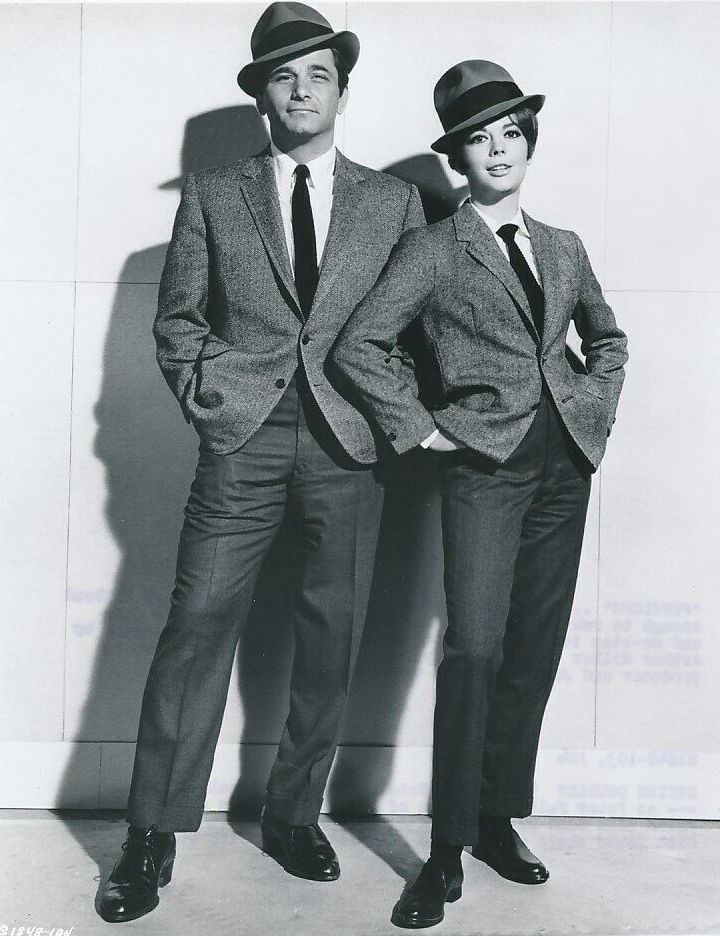
With Natalie Wood in Penelope (1966)

Despite his stage success, a theatrical agent advised Falk not to expect much film acting work because of his artificial eye. He failed a screen test at Columbia Pictures and was told by studio boss Harry Cohn: "For the same price I can get an actor with two eyes." He also failed to get a role in the film Marjorie Morningstar, despite a promising interview for the second lead. His first film performances were in small roles in Wind Across the Everglades (1958), The Bloody Brood (1959), and Pretty Boy Floyd (1960). Falk's performance in Murder, Inc. (1960) was a turning point in his career. He was cast in the supporting role of killer Abe Reles in a film based on the real-life murder gang of that name who terrorized New York in the 1930s. The New York Times film critic Bosley Crowther, while dismissing the movie as "an average gangster film", singled out Falk's "amusingly vicious performance". Crowther wrote:

Mr. Falk, moving as if weary, looking at people out of the corners of his eyes and talking as if he had borrowed Marlon Brando's chewing gum, seems a travesty of a killer, until the water suddenly freezes in his eyes and he whips an icepick from his pocket and starts punching holes in someone's ribs. Then viciousness pours out of him and you get a sense of a felon who is hopelessly cracked and corrupt.

The film turned out to be Falk's breakout role. In his autobiography, Just One More Thing (2006), Falk said his selection for the film from thousands of other Off-Broadway actors was a "miracle" that "made my career" and that without it, he would not have received the other significant movie roles that he later played. Falk, who played Reles again in the 1960 TV series The Witness, was nominated for a Best Supporting Actor Academy Award for his performance in the film.

In 1961, multiple Academy Award-winning director Frank Capra cast Falk in the comedy Pocketful of Miracles. The film was Capra's last feature, and although it was not the commercial success he hoped it would be, he "gushed about Falk's performance". Falk was nominated for an Oscar for the role. In his autobiography, Capra wrote about Falk:

The entire production was agony ... except for Peter Falk. He was my joy, my anchor to reality. Introducing that remarkable talent to the techniques of comedy made me forget pains, tired blood, and maniacal hankerings to murder Glenn Ford (the film's star). Thank you Peter Falk.

For his part, Falk says he "never worked with a director who showed greater enjoyment of actors and the acting craft. There is nothing more important to an actor than to know that the one person who represents the audience to you, the director, is responding well to what you are trying to do." Falk once recalled how Capra reshot a scene even though he yelled "Cut and Print", indicating the scene was finalized. When Falk asked him why he wanted it reshot: "He laughed and said that he loved the scene so much he just wanted to see us do it again. How's that for support!"

For the remainder of the 1960s, Falk had mainly supporting movie roles and TV guest-starring appearances. Falk portrayed one of two cabbies who fall victim to greed in the epic 1963 star-studded comedy It's a Mad, Mad, Mad, Mad World, although he appears only in the last fifth of the movie. His other roles included the character of Guy Gisborne in the Rat Pack musical comedy Robin and the 7 Hoods (1964), in which he sings one of the film's numbers, and the spoof The Great Race (1965) with Jack Lemmon, Tony Curtis, and Natalie Wood.

=== Early television roles ===
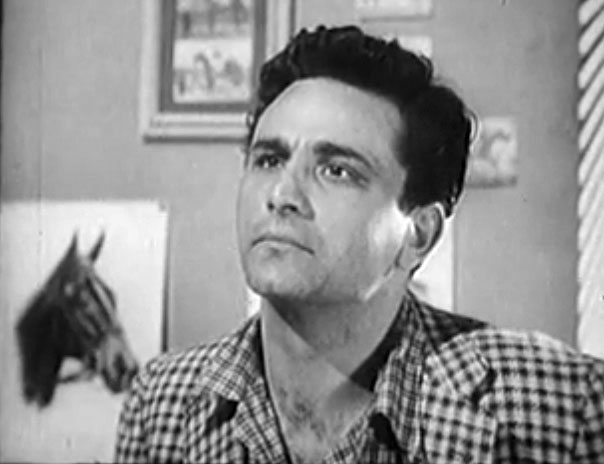
In Decoy (1959)

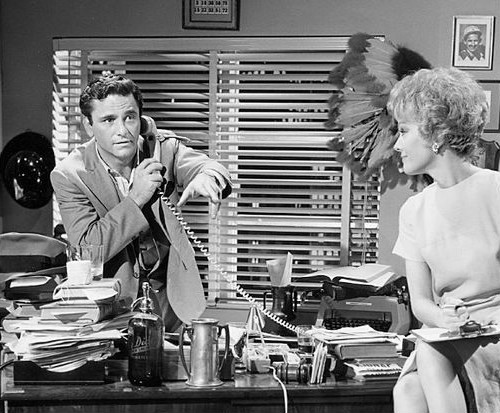
Peter Falk and Joanna Barnes from the television program The Trials of O'Brien in 1966

Falk first appeared on television in 1957, in the dramatic anthology programs that later became known as the "Golden Age of Television". In 1957, he appeared in one episode of Robert Montgomery Presents. He was also cast in Studio One, Kraft Television Theater, New York Confidential, Naked City, The Untouchables, Have Gun–Will Travel, The Islanders, and Decoy with Beverly Garland cast as the first female police officer in a series lead. Falk often portrayed unsavory characters on television during the early 1960s. In The Twilight Zone episode "The Mirror", Falk starred as a paranoid Castro-type revolutionary who, intoxicated with power, begins seeing would-be assassins in a mirror. He also starred in two of Alfred Hitchcock's television series, as a gangster terrified of death in a 1961 episode of Alfred Hitchcock Presents and as a homicidal evangelist in 1962's The Alfred Hitchcock Hour.

In 1961, Falk was nominated for an Emmy Award for his performance in the episode "Cold Turkey" of James Whitmore's short-lived series The Law and Mr. Jones on ABC. On September 29, 1961, Falk and Walter Matthau guest-starred in the premiere episode, "The Million Dollar Dump", of ABC's crime drama Target: The Corruptors, with Stephen McNally and Robert Harland. He won an Emmy for "The Price of Tomatoes", a drama carried in 1962 on The Dick Powell Show.

In 1961, Falk earned the distinction of becoming the first actor to be nominated for an Oscar and an Emmy in the same year. He received nominations for his supporting roles in Murder, Inc. and the television program The Law and Mr. Jones. Incredibly, Falk repeated this double nomination in 1962, being nominated again for a supporting actor role in Pocketful of Miracles and best actor in "The Price of Tomatoes", an episode of The Dick Powell Show, for which he took home the award.

In 1963, Falk and Tommy Sands appeared in "The Gus Morgan Story" on ABC's Wagon Train as brothers who disagreed on the route for a railroad. Falk played the title role of "Gus", and Sands was his younger brother, Ethan Morgan. After Ethan accidentally shoots wagonmaster Chris Hale, played by John McIntire, while in the mountains, Gus has to decide whether to rescue Hale or his brother (suffering from oxygen deprivation). This episode is remembered for its examination of how far a man will persist amid adversity to preserve his own life and that of his brother.

Having had many roles in film and television during the early 1960s, Falk's first lead in a television series came with CBS's The Trials of O'Brien. The show ran from 1965 to 1966, its 22 episodes featuring Falk as a Shakespeare-quoting lawyer who defends clients while solving mysteries. In 1966, he also co-starred in a television production of Brigadoon with Robert Goulet.

In 1971, Pierre Cossette produced the first Grammy Awards show on television with some help from Falk. Cossette writes in his autobiography: "What meant the most to me, though, is the fact that Peter Falk saved my ass. I love show business, and I love Peter Falk."

=== Columbo ===
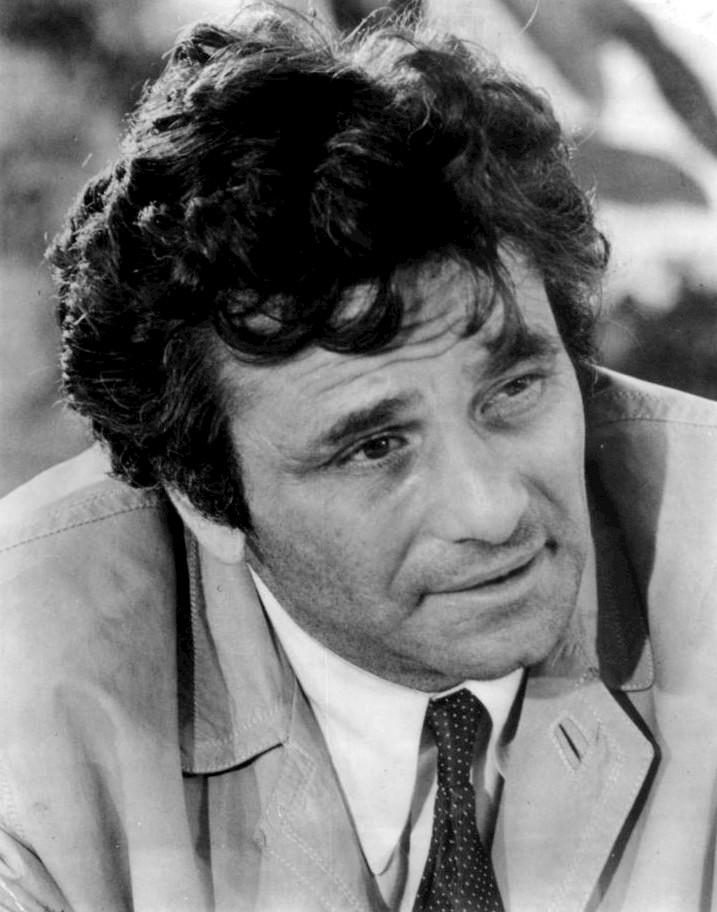
As Lt. Columbo, 1973

Although Falk appeared in numerous other television roles in the 1960s and 1970s, he is best known as the star of the TV series Columbo, "everyone's favorite rumpled television detective". His character, known for his catchphrase: "Just one more thing", is a shabby and deceptively absent-minded police detective driving a Peugeot 403, who had first appeared in the 1968 film Prescription: Murder. Columbo was created by William Link and Richard Levinson. The show was of a type known as an inverted detective story; it typically reveals the murderer at the beginning, then shows how the Los Angeles homicide detective goes about solving the crime. Falk would describe his role to film historian and author David Fantle:

Columbo has a genuine mistiness about him. It seems to hang in the air ... [and] he's capable of being distracted ... Columbo is an ass-backwards Sherlock Holmes. Holmes had a long neck, Columbo has no neck; Holmes smoked a pipe, Columbo chews up six cigars a day.

Television critic Ben Falk (no relation) added that Falk "created an iconic cop ... who always got his man (or woman) after a tortuous cat-and-mouse investigation". He also noted the idea for the character was "apparently inspired by Dostoyevsky's dogged police inspector, Porfiry Petrovich, in the novel Crime and Punishment".

Peter Falk tries to analyze the character and notes the correlation between his own personality and Columbo's:

I'm a Virgo Jew, and that means I have an obsessive thoroughness. It's not enough to get most of the details; it's necessary to get them all. I've been accused of perfectionism. When Lew Wasserman (head of Universal Studios) said that Falk is a perfectionist, I don't know whether it was out of affection or because he felt I was a monumental pain in the ass.

With "general amazement", Falk notes: "The show is all over the world. I've been to little villages in Africa with maybe one TV set, and little kids will run up to me shouting, 'Columbo, Columbo!'" Singer Johnny Cash recalled acting in one episode ("Swan Song"), and although he was not an experienced actor, he writes in his autobiography, "Peter Falk was good to me. I wasn't at all confident about handling a dramatic role, and every day he helped me in all kinds of little ways."

The first episode of Columbo as a series was directed in 1971 by a 24-year-old Steven Spielberg in one of his earliest directing jobs. Falk recalled the episode to Spielberg biographer Joseph McBride:

Let's face it, we had some good fortune at the beginning. Our debut episode, in 1971, was directed by this young kid named Steven Spielberg. I told the producers, Link and Levinson: "This guy is too good for Columbo" ... Steven was shooting me with a long lens from across the street. That wasn't common twenty years ago. The comfort level it gave me as an actor, besides it's a great look artistically—well, it told you that this wasn't any ordinary director.

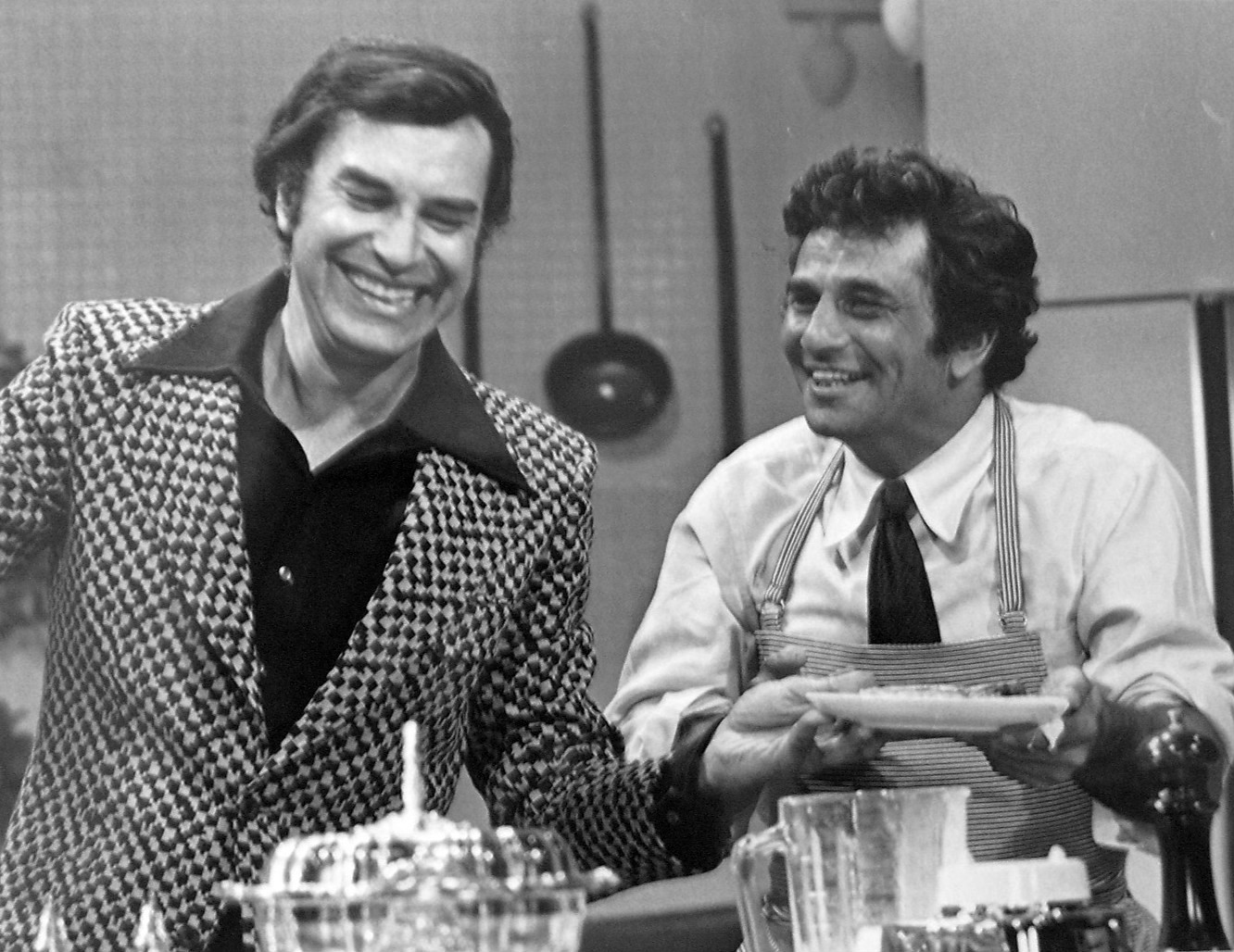
As Lt. Columbo with Martin Landau in episode "Double Shock" where Landau played a dual role as twin brothers, 1973

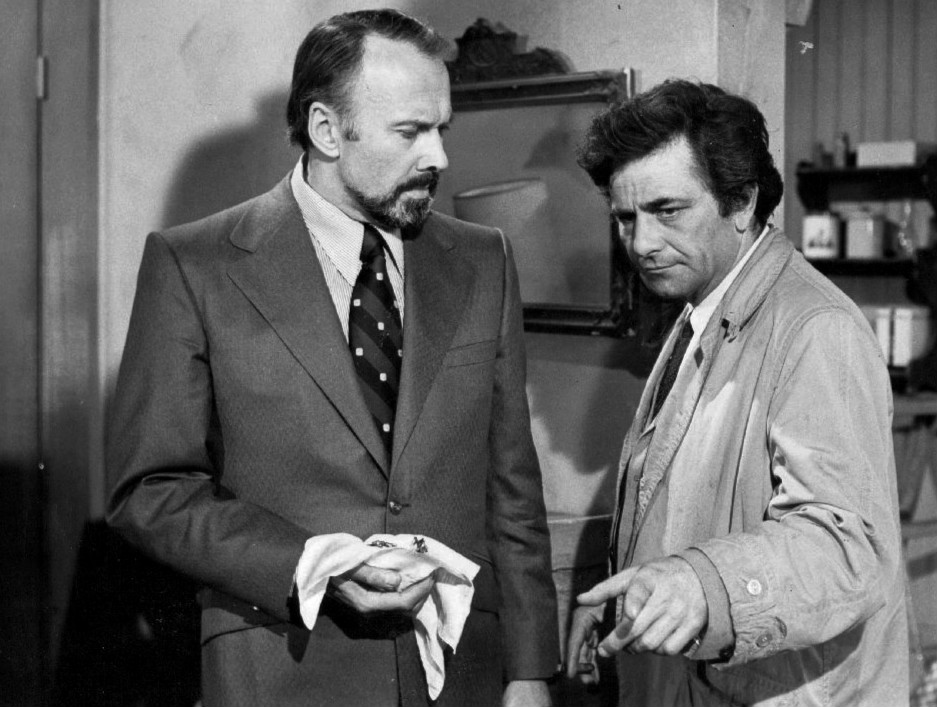
As Lt. Columbo with Richard Kiley in episode "A Friend In Deed" aired on May 5, 1974

The character of Columbo had previously been played by Bert Freed in a 1960 television episode of The Chevy Mystery Show ("Enough Rope"), and by Thomas Mitchell on Broadway. Falk first played Columbo in Prescription: Murder, a 1968 TV movie, and the 1970 pilot for the series, Ransom for a Dead Man. From 1971 to 1978, Columbo aired regularly on NBC as part of the umbrella series NBC Mystery Movie. All episodes were of TV movie length, in a 90- or 120-minute slot including commercials. In 1989, the show returned on ABC in the form of a less frequent series of TV movies, still starring Falk, airing until 2003. Falk won four Emmys for his role as Columbo.

Columbo was so popular, co-creator William Link wrote a series of short stories published as The Columbo Collection (Crippen & Landru, 2010) which includes a drawing by Falk of himself as Columbo, while the cover features a caricature of Falk/Columbo by Al Hirschfeld.

Lieutenant Columbo owns a Basset Hound named Dog. Originally, it was not going to appear in the show because Peter Falk believed that it "already had enough gimmicks" but, once the two met, Falk stated that Dog "was exactly the type of dog that Columbo would own", so he was added to the show and made his first appearance in 1972's "Étude In Black".

Columbo's wardrobe was provided by Peter Falk; they were his own clothes, including the high-topped shoes and the shabby raincoat, which made its first appearance in Prescription: Murder. Falk would often ad lib his character's idiosyncrasies (fumbling through his pockets for a piece of evidence and discovering a grocery list, asking to borrow a pencil, becoming distracted by something irrelevant in the room at a dramatic point in a conversation with a suspect, etc.), inserting these into his performance as a way to keep his fellow actors off-balance. He felt it helped to make their confused and impatient reactions to Columbo's antics more genuine. According to Levinson, the catchphrase "one more thing" was conceived when he and Link were writing the play: "we had a scene that was too short, and we'd already had Columbo make his exit. We were too lazy to retype the scene, so we had him come back and say, 'Oh, just one more thing...' It was never planned."

Columbo featured an unofficial signature tune, the children's song "This Old Man". It was introduced in the episode "Any Old Port in a Storm" in 1973 and the detective can be heard humming or whistling it often in subsequent films. Peter Falk admitted that it was a melody he enjoyed, and one day it became a part of his character. The tune was also used in various score arrangements throughout the three decades of the series, including opening and closing credits. A version of it, titled "Columbo", was created by one of the show's composers, Patrick Williams.

A few years prior to his death, Falk had expressed interest in returning to the role. In 2007, he said he had chosen a script for one last Columbo episode, "Columbo: Hear No Evil". The script was renamed "Columbo's Last Case". ABC declined the project. In response, producers for the series attempted to shop the project to foreign production companies. However, Falk was diagnosed with dementia in late 2007. Falk died on June 23, 2011, aged 83.

Peter Falk won four Emmy Awards for his portrayal of Lieutenant Columbo in 1972, 1975, 1976 and 1990. Falk directed just one episode: "Blueprint for Murder" in 1971, although it is rumored that he and John Cassavetes were largely responsible for direction duties on "Étude in Black" in 1972. Falk's own favorite Columbo episodes were "Any Old Port in a Storm", "Forgotten Lady", "Now You See Him" and "Identity Crisis". Falk was rumored to be earning a record $300,000 per episode when he returned for season 6 of Columbo in 1976. This doubled to $600,000 per episode when the series made its comeback in 1989. In 1997, "Murder by the Book" was ranked at No. 16 in TV Guide's '100 Greatest Episodes of All Time' list. Two years later, the magazine ranked Lieutenant Columbo No. 7 on its '50 Greatest TV Characters of All Time' list.

=== Later career ===
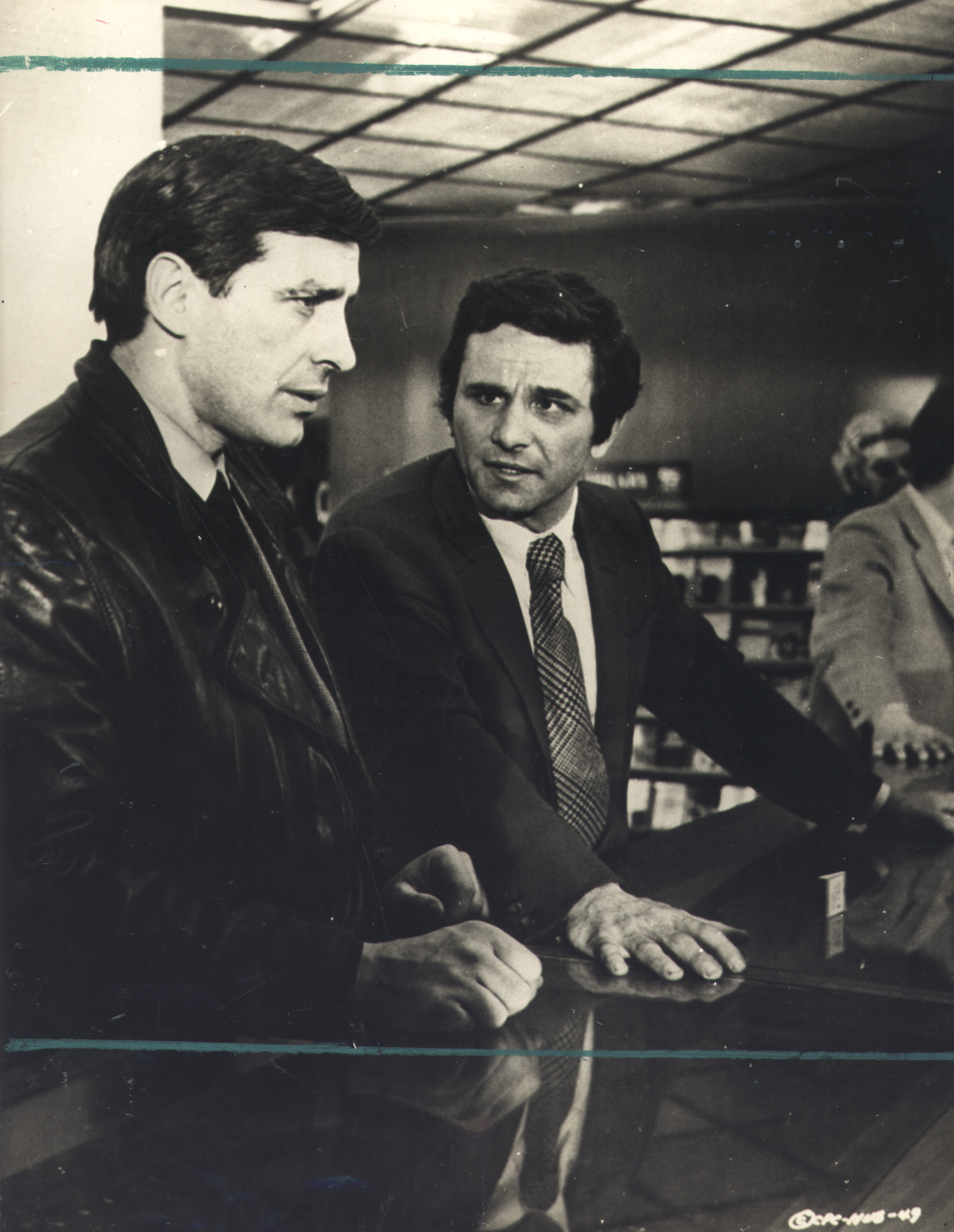
John Cassavetes and Peter Falk in 1971

Falk was a close friend of independent film director John Cassavetes and appeared in his films Husbands, A Woman Under the Influence, and, in a cameo, at the end of Opening Night. Cassavetes guest-starred in the Columbo episode "Étude in Black" in 1972; Falk, in turn, co-starred with Cassavetes in Elaine May's film Mikey and Nicky (1976). Falk describes his experiences working with Cassavetes, specifically remembering his directing strategies: "Shooting an actor when he might be unaware the camera was running."

You never knew when the camera might be going. And it was never: 'Stop. Cut. Start again.' John would walk in the middle of a scene and talk, and though you didn't realize it, the camera kept going. So I never knew what the hell he was doing. [Laughs] But he ultimately made me, and I think every actor, less self-conscious, less aware of the camera than anybody I've ever worked with.

In 1978, Falk appeared on the comedy TV show The Dean Martin Celebrity Roast, portraying his Columbo character, with Frank Sinatra the evening's victim. Director William Friedkin said of Falk's role in his film The Brink's Job (1978): "Peter has a great range from comedy to drama. He could break your heart or he could make you laugh."

Falk continued to work in films, including his performance as an ex-CIA officer of questionable sanity in the comedy The In-Laws. Director Arthur Hiller said during an interview that the "film started out because Alan Arkin and Peter Falk wanted to work together. They went to Warner Brothers and said, 'We'd like to do a picture,' and Warner said fine ... and out came The In-laws ... of all the films I've done, The In-laws is the one I get the most comments on." Movie critic Roger Ebert compared the film with a later remake:

Peter Falk and Alan Arkin in the earlier film, versus Michael Douglas and Albert Brooks this time ... yet the chemistry is better in the earlier film. Falk goes into his deadpan lecturer mode, slowly and patiently explaining things that sound like utter nonsense. Arkin develops good reasons for suspecting he is in the hands of a madman.

Falk appeared in The Great Muppet Caper, The Princess Bride, Murder by Death, The Cheap Detective, Vibes, Made, and in Wim Wenders' 1987 German-language film Wings of Desire and its 1993 sequel, Faraway, So Close!. In Wings of Desire, Falk played a semi-fictionalized version of himself, a famous American actor who had once been an angel, but who had grown disillusioned with only observing life on Earth and had in turn given up his immortality. Falk described the role as "the craziest thing that I've ever been offered", but he earned critical acclaim for his supporting performance in the film.

In 1998, Falk returned to the New York stage to star in an Off-Broadway production of Arthur Miller's Mr. Peters' Connections. His previous stage work included shady real estate salesman Shelley "the Machine" Levine in the 1986 Boston/Los Angeles production of David Mamet's prizewinning Glengarry Glen Ross. Falk starred in a trilogy of holiday television movies – A Town Without Christmas (2001), Finding John Christmas (2003), and When Angels Come to Town (2004) – in which he portrayed Max, a quirky guardian angel who uses disguises and subterfuge to steer his charges onto the right path. In 2005, he starred in The Thing About My Folks. Although movie critic Roger Ebert was not impressed with most of the other actors, he wrote in his review: "We discover once again what a warm and engaging actor Peter Falk is. I can't recommend the movie, but I can be grateful that I saw it, for Falk." In 2007, Falk appeared with Nicolas Cage in the thriller Next.

Falk's autobiography, Just One More Thing, was published in 2006.

== Personal life ==
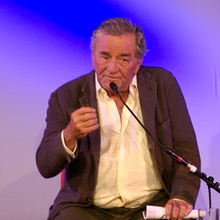
Peter Falk in 2007

Falk married Alyce Mayo, whom he met when the two were students at Syracuse University, on April 17, 1960. The couple adopted two daughters, Catherine (who became a private investigator) and Jacqueline. Jacqueline died by suicide in April 2026 at the age of 60. Falk and his wife divorced in 1976. On December 7, 1977, he married actress Shera Danese, who guest-starred in more episodes of the Columbo series than any other actress.

Falk was an accomplished artist, and in October 2006 he had an exhibition of his drawings at the Butler Institute of American Art. He took classes at the Art Students League of New York for many years.

Falk was a chess aficionado and a spectator at the American Open in Santa Monica, California, in November 1972, and at the U.S. Open in Pasadena, California, in August 1983.

His memoir Just One More Thing (ISBN 978-0-78671795-8) was published by Carroll & Graf on August 23, 2006.

=== Health ===
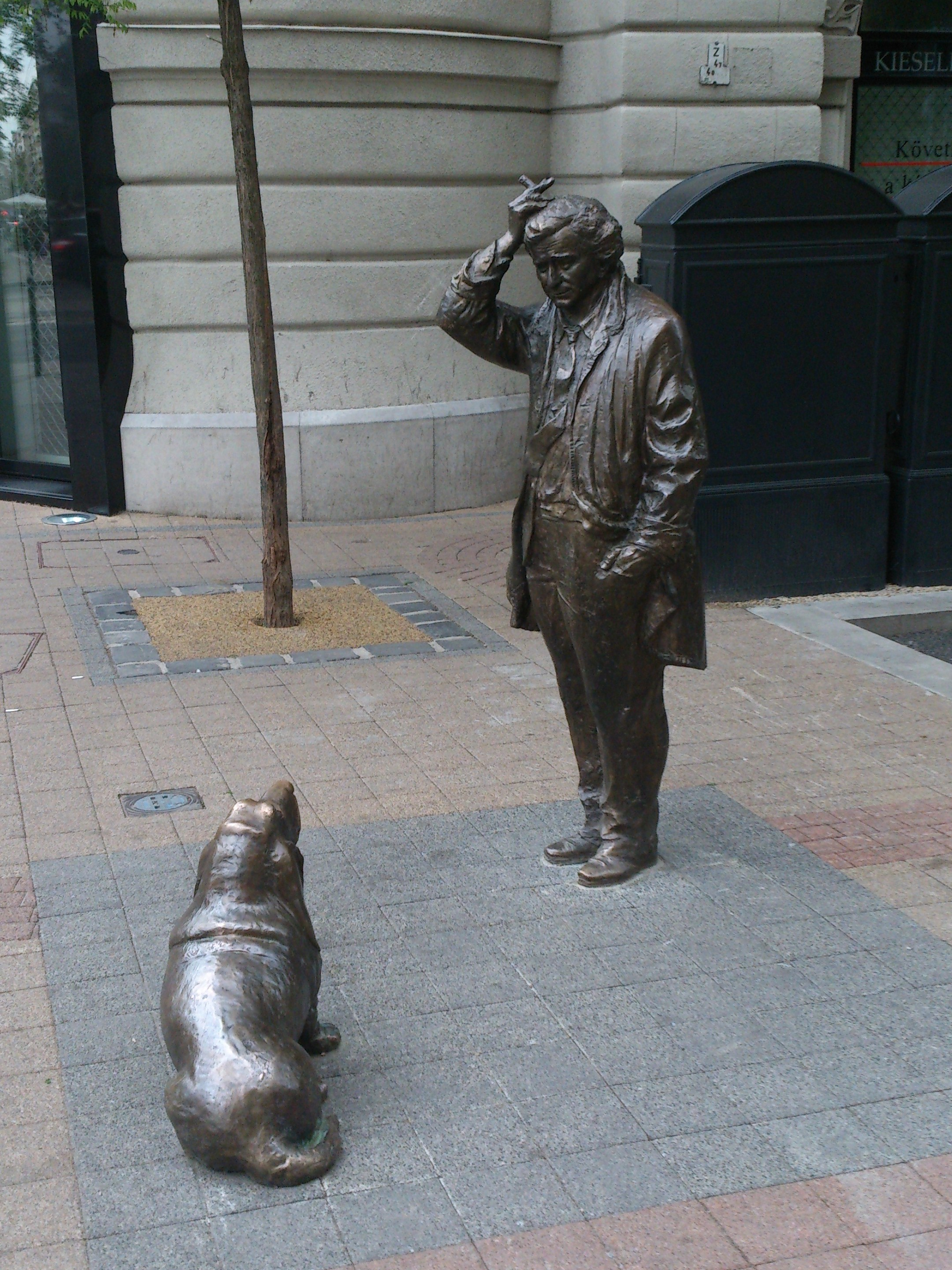
Statue of Falk as Columbo with his dog in Budapest, Hungary

In December 2008, it was reported that Falk had been diagnosed with Alzheimer's disease. In June 2009, at a two-day conservatorship trial in Los Angeles, one of Falk's personal physicians, Dr. Stephen Read, reported he had rapidly slipped into dementia after a series of dental operations in 2007. Read said it was unclear whether Falk's condition had worsened as a result of anesthesia or some other reaction to the operations. Shera Danese Falk was appointed as her husband's conservator.

== Death ==
On the evening of June 23, 2011, Falk died at his longtime home on Roxbury Drive in Beverly Hills at the age of 83. The causes of death were pneumonia and Alzheimer's disease. His daughters said they would remember his "wisdom and humor". He is buried at Westwood Village Memorial Park Cemetery in Los Angeles, California.

His death was marked by tributes from many film celebrities including Jonah Hill and Stephen Fry. Steven Spielberg said, "I learned more about acting from him at that early stage of my career than I had from anyone else". Rob Reiner said: "He was a completely unique actor", and went on to say that Falk's work with Alan Arkin in The In-Laws was "one of the most brilliant comedy pairings we've seen on screen". His epitaph reads: "I'm not here, I'm home with Shera."

=== Peter Falk's Law ===
According to Falk's daughter Catherine, his second wife Shera Danese (who also was his conservator) allegedly forbade some of his family members from visiting him; she also did not inform them of major changes in his condition and did not notify them of his death and funeral arrangements. In 2015, Catherine encouraged the passage of legislation called colloquially "Peter Falk's Law". The new law was passed in New York state to protect children from being cut off from news of serious medical and end-of-life developments regarding their parents or from contact with them. The law provides guidelines regarding visitation rights and notice of death with which an incapacitated person's guardians or conservators must comply.

As of 2020, more than fifteen states had enacted such laws. In introducing the measure, New York State Senator John DeFrancisco said, "For every wrong there should be a remedy. This bill gives a remedy to children of elderly and infirm parents who have been cut off from receiving information about their parents. It also gives them an avenue through the courts to obtain visitation rights with the parents."

== Filmography ==
=== Film ===
Year	Title	Role	Notes
1958	Wind Across the Everglades	Writer	film debut
1959	The Bloody Brood	Nico	
1960	Pretty Boy Floyd	Shorty Walters	
1960	Murder, Inc.	Abe Reles	Academy Award nomination
1960	The Secret of the Purple Reef	Tom Weber	
1961	Pocketful of Miracles	Joy Boy	Academy Award nomination
1962	Pressure Point	Young Psychiatrist	
1963	The Balcony	Police Chief	
1963	It's a Mad, Mad, Mad, Mad World	Third Cab Driver	
1964	Robin and the 7 Hoods	Guy Gisborne	
1964	Attack and Retreat	Medic Captain	
1965	The Great Race	Maximilian Meen	
1966	Penelope	Lieutenant Horatio Bixbee	
1967	Luv	Milt Manville	
1967	Too Many Thieves	Danny	
1968	Anzio	Corporal Jack Rabinoff	
1969	Machine Gun McCain	Charlie Adamo	
1969	Castle Keep	Sergeant Rossi	
1970	Operation Snafu	Peter Pawney	
1970	Husbands	Archie Black	
1974	A Woman Under the Influence	Nick Longhetti	
1976	Griffin and Phoenix	Geoffrey Griffin	
1976	Murder by Death	Sam Diamond	
1976	Mikey and Nicky	Mikey	
1977	Opening Night	Himself	Cameo appearance, uncredited
1978	The Cheap Detective	Lou Peckinpaugh	
1978	The Brink's Job	Tony Pino	
1978	Scared Straight!	Himself – Narrator	
1979	The In-Laws	Vincent J. Ricardo	
1981	The Great Muppet Caper	Tramp	
1981	...All the Marbles	Harry Sears	
1986	Big Trouble	Steve Rickey	
1987	Wings of Desire	Himself	
1987	Happy New Year	Nick	
1987	The Princess Bride	Grandfather / Narrator	
1988	Vibes	Harry Buscafusco	
1989	Cookie	Dominick "Dino" Capisco	
1990	In the Spirit	Roger Flan	
1990	Tune in Tomorrow	Pedro Carmichael	
1992	Faraway, So Close!	Himself	
1992	The Player	Himself	
1995	Roommates	Rocky Holzcek	
1995	Cops n Roberts	Salvatore Santini	
1998	Money Kings	Vinnie Glynn	
2000	Lakeboat	The Pierman	
2000	Enemies of Laughter	Paul's Father	
2001	Hubert's Brain	Thompson	Voice
2001	Made	Max	
2001	Corky Romano	Francis A. "Pops" Romano	
2002	Three Days of Rain	Waldo	
2002	Undisputed	Mendy Ripstein	
2004	Shark Tale	Don Ira Feinberg	Voice, cameo
2005	Checking Out	Morris Applebaum	
2005	The Thing About My Folks	Sam Kleinman	
2007	Three Days to Vegas	Gus 'Fitzy' Fitzgerald	
2007	Next	Irv	
2009	American Cowslip	Father Randolph	Final film role

=== Television ===
Year	Title	Role	Notes
1957	Robert Montgomery Presents		Season 8 Episode 36: "Return Visit"
1957	Studio One	Carmen's Assistant	Season 9 Episode 35: "The Mother Bit"
1957	Studio One	Jack	Season 9 Episode 45: "Rudy"
1957	Kraft Suspense Theatre	Radar Operator / Izzy	Season 10 Episode 26: "Collision"
1957–59	Camera Three	Stendhal / Don Chucho	8 episodes
1958	Naked City	Extortionist	Season 1 Episode 11: "Lady Bug, Lady Bug"
1958	Kraft Suspense Theatre	Izzy	Season 11 Episode 44: "Night Cry"
1958	Decoy	Fred Dana	Season 1 Episode 37: "The Come Back"
1959	Omnibus	Charlie	Season 7 Episode 13: "The Strange Ordeal of the Normandier"
1959	Brenner	Fred Gaines	Season 1 Episode 4: "Blind Spot"
1959	Deadline	Al Bax	Season 1 Episode 11: "The Human Storm"
1959	New York Confidential	Pete	Season 1 Episode 11: "The Girl from Nowhere"
1959	Play of the Week	Mestizo	Season 1 Episode 2: "The Power and the Glory"
1960	Play of the Week	Mestizo	Season 1 Episode 14: "The Emperor's Clothes"
1960	Naked City	Gimpy (uncredited)	Season 2 Episode 1: "A Death of Princes"
1960	The Islanders	Hooker	Season 1 Episode 6: "Hostage Island"
1960	Have Gun – Will Travel	Waller, Gambler	Season 4 Episode 9: "The Poker Fiend"
1960	The Witness	Abe Reles	Season 1 Episode 11: "Kid Twist"
1960	The Untouchables	Duke Mullen	Season 1 Episode 26: "The Underworld Bank"
1961	The Untouchables	Nate Selko	Season 3 Episode 1: "Troubleshooter"
1961	Naked City	Lee Staunton	Season 2 Episode 24: "A Very Cautious Boy"
1961	The Law and Mr. Jones	Sydney Jarmon	Season 1 Episode 20: "Cold Turkey"
1961	The Aquanauts	Jeremiah Wilson	Season 1 Episode 20: "The Jeremiah Adventure"
1961	The Aquanauts	Angel	Season 1 Episode 23: "The Double Adventure"
1961	Cry Vengeance!	Priest	Television movie
1961	The Million Dollar Incident	Sammy	Television movie
1961	Alfred Hitchcock Presents	Meyer Fine	Season 6 Episode 28: "Gratitude"
1961	The Barbara Stanwyck Show	Joe	Season 1 Episode 32: "The Assassin"
1961	Target: The Corruptors!	Nick Longo	Season 1 Episode 1: "The Million Dollar Dump"
1961	The Twilight Zone	Ramos Clemente	Season 3 Episode 6: "The Mirror"
1962	Naked City	Frankie O'Hearn	Season 3 Episode 25: "Lament for a Dead Indian"
1962	The New Breed	Lopez	Season 1 Episode 15: "Cross the Little Line"
1962	87th Precinct	Greg Brovane	Season 1 Episode 19: "The Pigeon"
1962	Here's Edie	Cabbie	Episode #1.1
1962	The Alfred Hitchcock Hour	Robert Evans	Season 1 Episode 13: "Bonfire"
1962	The Dick Powell Show	Aristede Fresco	Season 1 Episode 17: "Price of Tomatoes"
1962	The Dick Powell Show	Dr. Alan Keegan	Season 2 Episode 4: "The Doomsday Boys"
1962	The DuPont Show of the Week	Collucci	Season 1 Episode 24: "A Sound of Hunting"
1963	The Dick Powell Show	Martin	Season 2 Episode 18: "The Rage of Silence"
1963	Dr. Kildare	Matt Gunderson	Season 2 Episode 29: "The Balance and the Crucible"
1963	Wagon Train	Gus Morgan	Season 7 Episode 3: "The Gus Morgan Story"
1963	Bob Hope Presents the Chrysler Theatre	Bert Graumann	Season 1 Episode 4: "Four Kings"
1964	The DuPont Show of the Week	Danilo Diaz	Season 3 Episode 21: "Ambassador at Large"
1964	Ben Casey	Dr. Jimmy Reynolds	Season 4 Episode 6: "For Jimmy, the Best of Everything"
1964	Ben Casey		Season 4 Episode 12: "Courage at 3:00 A.M."
1965	Bob Hope Presents the Chrysler Theatre	Bara	Season 2 Episode 19: "Perilous Times"
1965–66	The Trials of O'Brien	Daniel O'Brien	22 episodes
1966	Bob Hope Presents the Chrysler Theatre	Mike Galway	Season 4 Episode 7: "Dear Deductible"
1966	Brigadoon	Jeff Douglas	Television movie
1967	The Red Skelton Hour	Colonel Hush-Hush	Season 16 Episode 16: "In One Head and Out the Other"
1968	A Hatful of Rain	Polo Pope	Television movie
1968–2003	Columbo	Lieutenant Columbo	69 episodes
1971	The Name of the Game	Lewis Corbett	Season 3 Episode 15: "A Sister from Napoli"
1971	A Step Out of Line	Harry Connors	Television movie
1978	The Dean Martin Celebrity Roast	Columbo	Television special
1992	The Larry Sanders Show	Himself	Season 1 Episode 8: "Out of the Loop"
1996	The Sunshine Boys	Willie Clark	Television movie
1997	Pronto	Harry Arno	Television movie
2000	A Storm in Summer	Abel Shaddick	Television movie
2001	The Lost World	Reverend Theo Kerr	Television movie
2001	A Town Without Christmas	Max	Television movie
2003	Finding John Christmas	Max	Television movie
2003	Wilder Days	James 'Pop Up' Morse	Television movie
2004	When Angels Come to Town	Max	Television movie (final TV role)

=== Theater ===
Year	Title	Role	Venue
1956	Saint Joan	English Soldier	Walter Kerr Theatre, Broadway
1956	Diary of a Scoundrel	Mamaev's Servant	Phoenix Theatre, off-Broadway
1956–57	The Iceman Cometh	Rocky Pioggi	Circle in the Square Theatre, Broadway
1964	The Passion of Josef D.	Stalin	Ethel Barrymore Theatre, Broadway
1971–73	The Prisoner of Second Avenue	Mel Edison	Eugene O'Neill Theatre, Broadway
2000	Defiled	Brian Dickey	Geffen Playhouse, Los Angeles. Final stage role

== Awards and nominations ==
=== Academy Awards ===
Year	Category	Nominated work	Result	Ref.
1960	Best Supporting Actor	Murder, Inc.	Nominated	
1961	Best Supporting Actor	Pocketful of Miracles	Nominated	

=== Emmy Awards ===
Year	Category	Nominated work	Result	Ref.
Primetime Emmy Awards
1961	Outstanding Performance in a Supporting Role by an Actor or Actress in a Single Program	The Law and Mr. Jones (Episode: "Cold Turkey")	Nominated	
1962	Outstanding Single Performance by an Actor in a Leading Role	The Dick Powell Show (Episode: "The Price of Tomatoes")	Won	
1972	Outstanding Continued Performance by an Actor in a Leading Role in a Dramatic Series	Columbo	Won	
1973	Outstanding Continued Performance by an Actor in a Leading Role (Drama Series – Continuing)	Columbo	Nominated	
1974	Best Lead Actor in a Limited Series	Columbo	Nominated	
1975	Outstanding Lead Actor in a Limited Series	Columbo	Won	
1976	Outstanding Lead Actor in a Drama Series	Columbo	Won	
1977	Outstanding Lead Actor in a Drama Series	Columbo	Nominated	
1978	Outstanding Lead Actor in a Drama Series	Columbo	Nominated	
1990	Outstanding Lead Actor in a Drama Series	Columbo	Won	
1991	Outstanding Lead Actor in a Drama Series	Columbo	Nominated	
1994	Outstanding Lead Actor in a Drama Series	Columbo	Nominated	
Daytime Emmy Awards
2001	Outstanding Performer in a Children's Special	A Storm in Summer	Nominated	

=== Golden Globe Awards ===
Year	Category	Nominated work	Result	Ref.
1961	Most Promising Newcomer – Male	Murder, Inc.	Nominated	
1971	Best Actor in a Television Series – Drama	Columbo	Nominated	
1972	Best Actor in a Television Series – Drama	Columbo	Won	
1973	Best Actor in a Television Series – Drama	Columbo	Nominated	
1974	Best Actor in a Television Series – Drama	Columbo	Nominated	
1975	Best Actor in a Television Series – Drama	Columbo	Nominated	
1977	Best Actor in a Television Series – Drama	Columbo	Nominated	
1990	Best Actor in a Television Series – Drama	Columbo	Nominated	
1991	Best Actor in a Miniseries or Motion Picture Made for Television	Columbo and the Murder of a Rock Star	Nominated	
1993	Best Actor in a Miniseries or Motion Picture Made for Television	Columbo: It's All in the Game	Nominated	

=== Other Awards ===
Year	Award	Category	Nominated work	Result	Ref.
2005	AARP Movies for Grownups Awards	Best Grownup Love Story	The Thing About My Folks	Nominated	
1976	Bambi Awards	TV Series International	Columbo	Won	
1993	Bambi Awards	TV Series International	Columbo	Won	
1975	Bravo Otto	Best Male TV Star	—N/a	Nominated	
2004	David di Donatello Awards	Golden Plate	—N/a	Won	
2005	Florida Film Festival	Lifetime Achievement Award	—N/a	Won	
1972	Golden Apple Awards	Male Star of the Year	—N/a	Won	
1976	Goldene Kamera	Best German Actor	Columbo	Won	
1974	Hasty Pudding Theatricals	Man of the Year	—N/a	Won	
1962	Laurel Awards	Top Male New Personality	—N/a	Nominated	
2003	Method Fest Independent Film Festival	Lifetime Achievement Award	—N/a	Won	
2006	Milan Film Festival	Best Actor	The Thing About My Folks	Won (Note: Tied with Josh Hartnett for Lucky Number Slevin.)	
2006	Online Film & Television Association Awards	Television Hall of Fame: Actors	—N/a	Inducted	
2021	Online Film & Television Association Awards	Television Hall of Fame: Characters	Lt. Columbo (from Columbo)	Inducted	
1989	People's Choice Awards	Favorite Male TV Performer	—N/a	Nominated	
1990	People's Choice Awards	Favorite Male TV Performer	—N/a	Nominated	
1974	Photoplay Awards	Favorite Male Star	—N/a	Nominated	
1976	Photoplay Awards	Favorite Movie	Murder by Death	Nominated	
2002	Stinkers Bad Movie Awards	Worst Supporting Actor	Undisputed	Nominated	
2005	TV Land Awards	Favorite "Casual Friday" Cop	Columbo	Nominated	

=== Other Honors ===
Year	Honor	Category	Result	Ref.
2013	Hollywood Walk of Fame	Television	Inducted	

== Bibliography ==
- Falk, Peter (2006), Just One More Thing: Stories from My Life, New York: Carroll & Graf Publishers, ISBN 0-7867-1795-5.
