= 15th Directors Guild of America Awards =

- Date: 1963
- Country: United States
- Presented by: Directors Guild of America

Highlights
- Best Director Feature Film: Lawrence of Arabia – David Lean
- Best Director Television: The Dick Powell Show for "Price of Tomatoes" – David Friedkin
- Website: https://www.dga.org/Awards/History/1960s/1962.aspx?value=1962

The 15th Directors Guild of America Awards, honoring the outstanding directorial achievements in film and television in 1962, were presented in 1963.

== Winners and nominees ==
=== Film ===
Feature Film

David Lean – Lawrence of Arabia

- Robert Aldrich – What Ever Happened to Baby Jane?
- Morton DaCosta – The Music Man
- John Frankenheimer – The Manchurian Candidate
- Pietro Germi – Divorce Italian Style
- John Huston – Freud: The Secret Passion
- Stanley Kubrick – Lolita
- Sidney Lumet – Long Day's Journey into Night
- Andrew Marton – The Longest Day
- Lewis Milestone – Mutiny on the Bounty
- Robert Mulligan – To Kill a Mockingbird
- Ralph Nelson – Requiem for a Heavyweight
- Arthur Penn – The Miracle Worker
- Tony Richardson – A Taste of Honey
- Peter Ustinov – Billy Budd

=== Television ===
Television

David Friedkin – The Dick Powell Show for "The Price of Tomatoes"

- Ray Garner – The River Nile
- Greg Garrison – The Danny Kaye Show
- Robert Gist – Naked City for "Today the Man Who Kills Ants is Coming"
- Buzz Kulik – The Dick Powell Show for "The Court Martial of Captain Wycliff"
- Daniel Petrie – The Defenders for "The Benefactor"
- Stuart Rosenberg – The Defenders for "Madman"
- George Schaefer – Hallmark Hall of Fame for "The Teahouse of the August Moon"
- Franklin J. Schaffner – A Tour of the White House with Mrs. John F. Kennedy
- Peter Tewksbury – It's a Man's World for "The Beavers and the Otters"
