= Roland Gross =

American film editor (1909–1989)

- Born: January 13, 1909; San Antonio, Texas, U.S.
- Died: February 11, 1989 (aged 80); Los Angeles, California, U.S.
- Occupation: Film editor
- Years active: 1935–1975
- Spouse: Kathryn P. Gross
- Children: 2

Roland Gross (January 13, 1909 – February 11, 1989) was an American film editor and television editor who had over 40 film and television credits during his career.

He was nominated in the category of Best Film Editing at the 17th Academy Awards for his work on the film None but the Lonely Heart.

== Selected filmography ==
Editor
Year	Film	Director	Notes
1943	Flight for Freedom	Lothar Mendes	
1943	The Sky's the Limit	Edward H. Griffith	
1943	Government Girl	Dudley Nichols	First collaboration with Dudley Nichols
1943	Tender Comrade	Edward Dmytryk	
1944	None but the Lonely Heart	Clifford Odets	
1944	Nevada	Edward Killy	First collaboration with Edward Killy
1945	Those Endearing Young Charms	Lewis Allen	
1945	West of the Pecos	Edward Killy	Second collaboration with Edward Killy
1946	Deadline at Dawn	Harold Clurman	
1946	Heartbeat	Sam Wood	
1946	Sister Kenny	Dudley Nichols	Second collaboration with Dudley Nichols
1947	The Woman on the Beach	Jean Renoir	
1947	Mourning Becomes Electra	Dudley Nichols	Third collaboration with Dudley Nichols
1949	The Set-Up	Robert Wise	
1949	The Woman on Pier 13	Robert Stevenson	
1950	Stromboli	Roberto Rossellini	Uncredited
1950	Gambling House	Ted Tetzlaff	First collaboration with Ted Tetzlaff
1951	The Thing from Another World	Christian Nyby	
1951	On Dangerous Ground	Nicholas Ray	
1952	Androcles and the Lion	Chester Erskine	
1953	Project Moonbase	Richard Talmadge	
1955	Son of Sinbad	Ted Tetzlaff	Second collaboration with Ted Tetzlaff
1957	The Story of Mankind	Irwin Allen	
1958	The Deep Six	Rudolph Maté	
1959	Island of Lost Women	Frank Tuttle	

Editorial department
Year	Film	Director	Role
1948	The Velvet Touch	Jack Gage	Editorial supervisor
1957	The Story of Mankind	Irwin Allen	Supervising editor
1973	Emperor of the North Pole	Robert Aldrich	Associate editor

Art department
Year	Film	Director	Role	Notes
1935	She	Lansing C. Holden; Irving Pichel	Production illustrator	Uncredited

TV movies

Editor
Year	Film	Director
1973	Letters from Three Lovers	John Erman
1975	Cage Without a Key	Buzz Kulik

TV series

Editor
Year	Title	Notes
1955	Stage 7	9 episodes
1955−56	Sheena, Queen of the Jungle	7 episodes
1955−56	The Star and the Story	4 episodes
1954−56	Four Star Playhouse	8 episodes
1956	G.E. Summer Originals	1 episode
1956	Chevron Hall of Stars	7 episodes
1955−57	Cavalcade of America	5 episodes
1956−57	Zane Grey Theatre	5 episodes
1957	Hey, Jeannie!	1 episode
1959	The Twilight Zone	1 episode
1959−64	Rawhide	51 episodes
1964−65	Voyage to the Bottom of the Sea	6 episodes
1965−68	Lost in Space	28 episodes
1968−69	Lancer	7 episodes
1969−70	Bracken's World	12 episodes
1971−72	Cade's County	5 episodes
1971−74	Gunsmoke	3 episodes

Editorial department
Year	Title	Role	Notes
1964−65	Voyage to the Bottom of the Sea	Supervising film editor	25 episodes
1965	Lost in Space	Supervising editor	1 episode
