= New York Confidential (TV series) =

British-American TV crime drama series (1958–1959)

- Genre: Crime drama
- Directed by: Jack Gage; Steve Sekely; Justus Addiss
- Starring: Lee Tracy
- Opening theme: Alfred Newman
- Ending theme: Joseph Mullendore
- No. of seasons: 1
- No. of episodes: 39

Production
- Executive producer: Leon Fromkess
- Production locations: United States; United Kingdom
- Camera setup: Single-camera
- Running time: 25 mins.
- Production companies: ITC Productions; Metropolis Productions

Original release
- Network: Syndication (United States); Rediffusion (United Kingdom)
- Release: 1958 – 1959

New York Confidential is a syndicated British-American crime drama series that aired from 1958 to 1959.

== Overview ==
Running for 39 half-hour monochrome episodes, the series chronicled the adventures of a New York City newspaper columnist Lee Cochran, played by Lee Tracy.

The series is often mis-remembered today as having flowed from a 1955 Broderick Crawford movie of the same name. However, neither Lee Cochran, nor any newspaper columnist, features in the film. In truth, the two works were unrelated attempts to adapt the same non-fiction book by Jack Lait and Lee Mortimer, with varying degrees of fidelity to that source. The film is frequently cited as being merely "suggested" by the book, whereas the television series is seen as being "based upon" it.

== Episode list ==
No.	Title	Directed by	Written by	Original release date
1	"Sudden Money"	Jack Gage	TBA	TBA
A fleeing bank robber hides the loot in Stan Adams' cab.
2	"A Covenant with Death"	Jack Gage	TBA	TBA
Lawyer John Webb creates a monster when he introduces his son to a mobster.
3	"Come Home to Death"	Jack Gage	TBA	TBA
Returning home after four months in the hospital, Charlie Harrison finds his wife is gone and his business has been sold.
4	"Semper Fidelis"	Jack Gage	TBA	TBA
An ex-marine asks Lee to help clear his grandson, who was implicated in a gangland murder.
5	"Chinatown, My Chinatown"	Jack Gage	TBA	TBA
Patrolman Willie Lum learns that his fiancee, an illegal alien, is being blackmailed by the man who smuggled her into the U.S.
6	"Child of Terror"	Steve Sekely	TBA	TBA
Little Michael Warner claims he's seen a murder, but no one believes him---except the killer.
7	"Legacy"	Steve Sekely	TBA	TBA
Lee tries to locate a girl who's supposedly inherited $100,000.
8	"Garment District"	Steve Sekely	TBA	TBA
It looks like the package a model was carrying was very valuable: someone killed her to get it.
9	"Law is for Suckers"	Steve Sekely	TBA	TBA
When a young car thief is killed, the police enlist his sister's help in capturing the rest of his gang.
10	"Massacre"	Jack Gage	TBA	TBA
As part of a plan to avenge her father's murder, Elva Dean gets engaged to one of the killers.
11	"Girl from Nowhere"	Steve Sekely	TBA	TBA
A young woman's body, stripped of all identification, is found in the East River.
12	"Skid Row Mouthpiece"	Steve Sekely	TBA	TBA
A murder witness conceals his identity successfully for 15 years---until he becomes a hero and makes the headlines.
13	"New Citizen"	Steve Sekely	Kenneth Gamet and Elwood Ullman	TBA
Lee is touched by the plight of an orphaned immigrant who faces deportation because his sponsor has died.
14	"The Bullet"	Steve Sekely	TBA	TBA
A killer, wounded by a policeman's bullet, refuses to have it removed.
15	"The Seeing Eye"	Steve Sekely	TBA	TBA
Lee searches for the crook who blinded a policeman in a gunfight.
16	"Man on Parole"	Jack Gage	TBA	TBA
Four carnival performers have reason to worry about Joe Vance's release---their testimony sent him to prison.
17	"Broadway Sam"	Steve Sekely	TBA	TBA
Sammy Watts falls in love but the girl has eyes only for an egotistical entertainer.
18	"Crosseyed Camera"	Jack Gage	TBA	TBA
A photographer claims a college professor was a participant in a raided crap game.
19	"Death in Pursuit"	Steve Sekely	TBA	TBA
After an attempt is made on his life, Joel Connors flees to New York. And so do the killers.
20	"The Skin Game"	Steve Sekely	TBA	TBA
Furrier Mark Maxwell cooperates with mobsters for money that will save his son's marriage.
21	"Medallion"	Jack Gage	TBA	TBA
Cabbie Abe Marko tries to help a friend hide from the mob.
22	"Horse on the Loose"	Steve Sekely	TBA	TBA
A narcotics-squad agent poses as a potential buyer.
23	"Incident at Fulton Market"	Jack Gage	TBA	TBA
Frank Valento enlarges his fish market and intrudes on a mobster's territory.
24	"Positive Identification"	Jack Gage	Jack Laird and Wilton Schiller	TBA
A detective fills out a police lineup and finds himself accused of murder.
25	"Custody"	Steve Sekely	TBA	TBA
A childless couple adopts a baby from an unscrupulous operator.
26	"The Most Dangerous Animal"	Steve Sekely	TBA	TBA
A murderer tries to silence the only person who can link him to the crime.
27	"House of Strangers"	Jack Gage	TBA	TBA
Lee helps a friend whose wife is about to leave him.
28	"Body on a Couch"	Steve Sekely	TBA	TBA
A blackmailer steals tapes that incriminate Elaine Bradbury in her millionaire father's death.
29	"The Lonely Man"	Jack Gage	TBA	TBA
Gangsters planning a diamond robbery use the firm's shy bookkeeper as their pawn.
30	"The Assassin"	Jack Gage	TBA	TBA
Wall Street executive George Wilson has a lucrative side line---as a hired killer.
31	"Johnny Cordes"	John Cromwell	TBA	TBA
A policeman is looking for the leader of a crime school for children.
32	"The Captain Kenesaw Story"	Steve Sekely	TBA	TBA
An elderly man struck it rich on a quiz show. Now his daughter-in-law is trying to have him declared incompetent.
33	"In Retaliation"	Jack Gage	TBA	TBA
An anonymous self-styled "avenger" threatens Lee Cochran's life.
34	"Miracle for Gisella"	Steve Sekely	Jack Laird and Wilton Schiller	TBA
Irate tenants persecute a kindly janitor, accusing him of wasting time by helping others.
35	"Face of Clay"	Steve Sekely	Donald S. Sanford	TBA
A has-been sculptress uncovers evidence about a 15-year-old murder case.
36	"Death is the Collateral"	Steve Sekely	TBA	TBA
Andras Kalman goes to loan sharks for money, despite evidence of their ruthlessness.
37	"Ransom"	Jack Gage	TBA	TBA
Kidnappers grab the daughter of a society matron.
38	"Life Care"	Jack Gage	TBA	TBA
Fanny Williams, a resident in a home for the aged, is suspicious of mysterious ailments afflicting some of the inhabitants.
39	"Airline Hostess"	Justus Addiss	Milton Krims	TBA
Airline hostess Nora Hunt risks her job to help another hostess.

== Production ==
Walter McGraw was the executive producer, and Emmett Murphy was the writer. The series aired in syndicated in the United States and was broadcast on London's local ITV station, Associated-Rediffusion, in the UK. It was co-produced by ITC Entertainment, Metropolis Productions, Inc., and Television Programs of America.
