= Chicago Confidential =

1957 film by Sidney Salkow

- Theatrical release poster
- Directed by: Sidney Salkow
- Screenplay by: Bernard Gordon (originally as Raymond T. Marcus)
- Based on: the novel Chicago: Confidential! by Jack Lait; Lee Mortimer
- Produced by: Robert E. Kent
- Starring: Brian Keith; Beverly Garland; Dick Foran
- Cinematography: Kenneth Peach
- Edited by: Grant Whytock
- Music by: Emil Newman
- Color process: Black and white
- Production company: Peerless Productions
- Distributed by: United Artists
- Release date: August 30, 1957
- Running time: 73 minutes
- Country: United States
- Language: English

Chicago Confidential is a 1957 American crime film noir directed by Sidney Salkow and starring Brian Keith, Beverly Garland and Dick Foran. It is based on the 1950 book Chicago: Confidential! by Jack Lait and Lee Mortimer.

Chicago Confidential was the first film produced for Edward Small by Robert E. Kent, who had been a writer and story supervisor at Columbia. Small and Kent went on to make many movies together.

== Plot ==
A union official named Blane is framed for the murder of another union official. The crime syndicate actually responsible for the killing is free to continue its activities. District Attorney Jim Fremont's plan to run for governor can be helped by a conviction of Blane, but thanks to Blane's fiancée Laura Barton he begins to suspect that Blane has been set up, launching a new investigation.

Laura testifies in court that Blane was with her at the time of the murder, and a neighbor, Sylvia Clarkson, swears she heard Blane's voice coming from Laura's apartment. Jim discovers a tape recording that suggests Clarkson might have been fooled, but Laura convinces him otherwise. Clarkson turns out to be conspiring with the criminals.

Racketeers, led by Ken Harrison, knock Jim cold and take Laura hostage. Harrison intends to flee by airplane. Jim and his men surround the plane at the air strip and a gun battle ensues, Harrison is shot. Jim's political future is now set, while Blane is released so that he can marry Laura.

== Cast ==
- Brian Keith as District Attorney Jim Fremont
- Beverly Garland as Laura Barton
- Dick Foran as Arthur "Artie" Blane
- Douglas Kennedy as Ken Harrison
- Paul Langton as Police Capt. Jake Parker
- Elisha Cook, Jr. as Candymouth Duggan
- Gavin Gordon as Alan Dixon
- Beverly Tyler as Sylvia Clarkson
- Buddy Lewis as Kerry Jordan
- Anthony George as Duncan

== See also ==
- Confidential (magazine)
- List of American films of 1957
