= The Velvet Touch =

1948 film by Jack Gage

- Theatrical release poster
- Directed by: Jack Gage
- Screenplay by: Leo Rosten; Walter Reilly (adaptation)
- Story by: William Mercer; Annabel Ross
- Produced by: Frederick Brisson
- Starring: Rosalind Russell; Leon Ames; Leo Genn; Claire Trevor; Sydney Greenstreet
- Cinematography: Joseph Walker
- Edited by: Chandler House; Roland Gross (editorial supervisor)
- Music by: Leigh Harline
- Production companies: Independent Artists, Ltd.
- Distributed by: RKO Pictures
- Release date: August 25, 1948 (US)
- Running time: 100 minutes
- Country: United States
- Language: English
- Budget: $1.6 million
- Box office: $1.2 million (US/Canada rentals)

The Velvet Touch is a 1948 American film noir directed by Jack Gage and starring Rosalind Russell, Sydney Greenstreet, Leon Ames, Leo Genn and Claire Trevor.

== Plot ==
In the upstairs theatre office, Valerie Stanton, a Broadway actress, tells Gordon Dunning, her producer and former lover, about her intention to marry architect Michael Morrell. Gordon threatens to tell Michael about her previous relationship with him. He grabs Valerie, wanting their relationship to continue. Valerie refuses as Gordon pushes her backwards, all the while threatening to ruin her life. She reaches for a statuette behind her and strikes Gordon with it. Realizing that Gordon is dead, a horrified Valerie leaves the office without being seen and says her goodbye to the cast on the closing night of their latest play. Meanwhile, Valerie's rival Marian Webster finds Gordon's lifeless body.

Valerie returns to her apartment, where Michael telephones her about Gordon's absence. In distress, Valerie falls asleep as she remembers the events leading up to his death. One night, after finishing a play, Valerie tells Gordon about her interest in appearing in rival producer Peter Gunther's upcoming revival of Hedda Gabler to prove her versatility as an actress. However, Gordon wants Valerie to continue appearing in his comedy plays. They arrive at Gordon's party, where Valerie meets Michael Morrell.

The next day, Valerie dines with Michael and develops a romantic attraction. Later that night, Valerie calls Marian into her dressing room and allows Marian to romantically pursue Gordon as she pleases. However, Gordon's feelings toward Valerie rekindle when she and Michael also arrive at the Sardi's restaurant. On the closing night of the play, Valerie reads columnist Jeff Trent's article, reporting that she will appear in Dunning's new comedic play Madly in Love in tomorrow's newspaper. Valerie confronts Gordon in his office as he did not consult her beforehand. She demands that Gordon issue a retraction, but he refuses. The argument evidently leads to Gordon's death. Valerie suddenly wakes up as her housemaid Nancy notifies her about Gordon's death.

A police sergeant arrives at Valerie's apartment, and notifies her that Captain Danbury has called the theater personnel to report their whereabouts during Gordon's murder. At the theater, Marian, who has been hospitalized, is implicated as the prime suspect. When the interrogation concludes, Danbury brings Valerie to Gordon's office and shows her a letter Gordon had written rejecting Marian's love. Danbury also states Marian's fingerprints were on the statuette. Valerie returns to her apartment and tells Michael she believes in Marian's innocence. However, Michael believes Marian can defend her own innocence and proposes to marry Valerie.

Michael invites Danbury to Valerie's interview with Jeff. As Michael converses with Danbury outside, Valerie postpones the interview. She then tells a hypothetical theory in which she could have killed Gordon. However, Danbury dismisses the theory as she lacks a motivation. Sometime later, Valerie visits Marian in her hospital room. Marian has guessed Valerie had killed Gordon and denounces her as a remorseless killer. Valerie goes to Danbury's office to confess until she learns that Marian has killed herself.

Under heavy distress, Valerie is unable to concentrate during rehearsals and runs back home. On the opening night of Valerie's new play, Danbury arrives at Valerie's stating that the investigation is closed, with Marian having killed Gordon. Trapped in her own guilt, Valerie walks about the theater until Michael confesses he already knew the truth. As the play progresses until the final act, Valerie writes a letter of confession, which Danbury finds in her velvet gloves. When the play finishes, Valerie turns herself in but receives her final standing ovation.

== Cast ==
- Rosalind Russell as Valerie Stanton
- Leo Genn as Michael Morrell
- Claire Trevor as Marian Webster
- Sydney Greenstreet as Captain Danbury
- Leon Ames as Gordon Dunning
- Frank McHugh as Ernie Boyle
- Walter Kingsford as Peter Gunther
- Dan Tobin as Jeff Trent
- Lex Barker as Paul Banton
- Nydia Westman as Susan Crane
- Theresa Harris as Nancy
- Russell Hicks as Judge Brack
- Irving Bacon as Albert
- Esther Howard as Pansy Dupont
- Harry Hayden as Mr. Crouch
- William Erwin as Howard Forman
- Martha Hyer as Helen Adams
- Steven Flagg as Jimmy

== Reception ==
Bosley Crowther of The New York Times thought the plot and its conclusion were too obvious. He wrote: "Since the murder is prefatory business in this new film which came to the Rivoli yesterday, we are telling no more than you'll witness two minutes after the picture begins. The rest is a long and tortuous survey of Miss Russell's efforts to elude discovery as the rather obvious murderess and get on with her promising career . . . This foregone conclusion of the story is only one of the film's weaknesses. The muddiness of the character played by Miss Russell is another one. The role was so randomly written by Leo Rosten that one finds it hard to see any solid personality or consistency in the dame."

Film critic Dennis Schwartz praised the production and called the film: "A sparkling crime melodrama richly steeped in theatrical atmosphere." In addition he wrote: "In this solid production, the tension is kept up until the final curtain call as to whether Russell will confess, get caught, or get away with the crime of passion."
