= U.S.A. Confidential =

1952 book by Jack Lait

- First edition
- Author: Jack Lait, Lee Mortimer
- Genre: Non-fiction
- Publisher: Crown Publishers
- Publication date: 1952

U.S.A. Confidential is a 1952 book written by Jack Lait and Lee Mortimer (Crown Publishers). Its theme is crime and corruption. The book is remarkable for early mentions of many who would become infamous, among them Benny Binion and Jimmy Fratianno.

A joint $7.5million lawsuit was filed against the authors of the book by the department store Neiman Marcus and its employees for defamatory statements made in the book. The suit was settled in 1955 out of court, with the Mortimer and the estate of Lait (he having died a year earlier) retracting those positions and paying an undisclosed sum.
