= Bad Company (1931 film) =

1931 film

- Theatrical poster for film
- Directed by: Tay Garnett
- Written by: Jack Lait (novel); Tay Garnett; Tom Buckingham
- Produced by: Charles R. Rogers; Harry Joe Brown
- Starring: Helen Twelvetrees; Ricardo Cortez
- Cinematography: Arthur C. Miller
- Edited by: Claude Berkeley
- Music by: Arthur Lange
- Distributed by: RKO Pathé
- Release date: October 2, 1931 (U.S.)
- Running time: 76 minutes
- Country: United States
- Language: English

Bad Company is a 1931 American pre-Code gangster film directed and co-written by Tay Garnett with Tom Buckingham based on Jack Lait's 1930 novel Put on the Spot. It stars Helen Twelvetrees and Ricardo Cortez. Told from the view of a woman, the working titles of this film were The Gangster's Wife and The Mad Marriage. Unlike many static early sound films, Garnett includes several scenes using a moving camera climaxing in a gigantic assault on an office building with both sides using heavy machine guns. The film adapts a novel by Jack Lait.

== Plot ==
Rich and beautiful Helen King is about to marry Steve Carlyle, a wealthy young professional. Unknown to Helen and her family, Steve is a legal advisor to a megalomaniac gangster Goldie Gorio.

Steve wishes to leave the rackets but Goldie reintroduces him to his future father-in-law, a rival gangster where both parties see the marriage as a symbol of peace and an end of violence in their transactions. Steve remains with Goldie and fills in for him to a visit to a rival gangster's boat where he is ambushed and nearly killed by their machine gun. Helen vows revenge on Goldie.

== Cast ==
- Helen Twelvetrees as Helen King
- Ricardo Cortez as Goldie Gorio
- John Garrick as Steve Carlyle
- Paul Hurst as Goldie's Butler
- Frank Conroy as Markham King
- Harry Carey as McBaine
- Frank McHugh as Doc
- Kenneth Thomson as Barnes
- Arthur Stone as Dummy
- Emma Dunn as Emma
- William V. Mong as Henry
- Edgar Kennedy as Buffington

(as per AFI database.)

== Critical reception ==
In a contemporary review in The New York Times, critic Mordaunt Hall wrote that the film was "good enough entertainment of its kind," that "machine guns, on the whole, provide the most effective bits," and that "Ricardo Cortez plays the part effectively [...] if he becomes a little ludicrous in his more savage moods, splitting a man's head for suggesting that a dinner coat ordinarily has but one button, turning homicidal lunatic when a cat pushes a plaster bust of himself off the table - he is at least honestly amusing." A retrospective review by Danny Reid on Pre-code.com stated that the film "gives us an underworld fully realized and utterly perverse [...] the violence is frankly shocking for the time, and the direction lively and playful" and "it’s the utter insanity of Cortez’s Capone-esque magnate you’ll take away with you."

== See also ==
- List of American films of 1931
- Harry Carey filmography
