= Finding John Christmas =

- Written by: Michael J. Murray
- Directed by: Andy Wolk
- Starring: Valerie Bertinelli; David Cubitt; Peter Falk; William Russ
- Theme music composer: Patrick Williams
- Country of origin: United States
- Original language: English

Production
- Producers: Ken Gross; Michael Mahoney
- Editor: Drake Silliman
- Running time: 91 mins. (approx)

Original release
- Network: CBS
- Release: November 30, 2003

Related
- A Town Without Christmas (2001); When Angels Come to Town (2004)

Finding John Christmas is a 2003 American made-for-television fantasy drama film that first aired on CBS. The film is a sequel to the 2001 television movie A Town Without Christmas.

== Plot ==
When a photojournalist (David Cubitt) in the fictional Bay City photographs a mysterious stranger performing an act of bravery, the act quickly becomes headline news and the town dubs the stranger "John Christmas". After seeing the photo, Kathleen McAllister (Valerie Bertinelli) becomes convinced that the mysterious stranger is in fact her long-lost brother Hank (William Russ), a former firefighter. With the town's help, Kathleen and Noah set about to find the stranger's true identity with the help of Max (Peter Falk), a Christmas angel.

Filmed in Nova Scotia, Canada, the film featured a scene of a burning school based on the real Our Lady of the Angels School fire in Chicago, Illinois in 1958.

== Cast ==
- Valerie Bertinelli.....Kathleen McAllister
- David Cubitt.....Noah Greeley
- Peter Falk.....Max
- William Russ.....Hank McAllister
- Jeremy Akerman.....Antonovitch
- David Calderisi.....Dr. Merkatz
- Patricia Gage.....Eleanor McAllister
- Michael Hirschbach.....Dr. Flynn
- Jennifer Pisana.....Soccoro Greeley
- Maria Ricossa.....Marcy Bernard

== See also ==
- List of Christmas films
- List of films about angels
