= When Angels Come to Town =

- Written by: Michael J. Murray
- Directed by: Andy Wolk
- Starring: Tammy Blanchard; Peter Falk; Katey Sagal
- Theme music composer: Patrick Williams
- Country of origin: United States
- Original language: English

Production
- Producers: Ken Gross, Irene Litinsky
- Editor: Drake Silliman
- Running time: 87 mins. (approx)
- Production companies: Daniel H. Blatt Productions; Paramount Network Television Productions

Original release
- Network: CBS
- Release: November 28, 2004

Related
- Finding John Christmas (2003)

When Angels Come to Town is a 2004 American made-for-television fantasy drama film directed by Andy Wolk and starring Tammy Blanchard, Peter Falk, and Katey Sagal. It first aired on CBS. The film is a second sequel to the 2001 television film A Town Without Christmas.

== Plot ==
The angel Max (Peter Falk) is sent to Maine to help out a family during the Christmas season. Max goes to a Christmas store and leaves behind a box. The attending counter girl, Sally (Tammy Blanchard) goes after him but Max has disappeared. Sally is a kindhearted young woman who is trying to gain custody of her younger brother Jimmy (Alexander Conti) so he doesn't go into the foster system. Because Max has diverted from his mission of delivering the box to its rightful owner by inadvertently helping the wrong family, his supervisor Jo (Katey Sagal) arrives to chastise him and guide him to the Hoffman family where father and son are almost estranged due to their disagreement in how to run their family owned Christmas ornament business.

== Cast ==
- Peter Falk as Max, a whimsical, kind angel sent to help the Hoffman family
- Tammy Blanchard as Sally Reid
- Seann Gallagher as Karl Hoffman, a young businessman who has recently taken over the family-run Christmas ornament business and is modernising the business much to the dismay of his old school German father
- Katey Sagal as Jo, an angel sent to supervise Max
- Alexander Conti as Jimmy Reid, Sally's kid brother
- Vlasta Vrána as Franz Hoffman, Karl's father who wants his son to appreciate their traditions
- Kathleen Fee as Marion, an employee at the Hoffmans' ornament factory
- Wyatt Bowen as Charlie
- Babs Chula as Lois Vernon, a social worker who is handling Jimmy's case
- Marc Anthony Krupa as Uncle Gregory

== Production ==
The film was produced Paramount Network Television Productions in association with Daniel H. Blatt Productions, with broadcaster CBS and Paramount both being owned by Viacom at the time. The rights to the film remained with Paramount Pictures when CBS split from Viacom in 2006 to form CBS Corporation, even though CBS Corporation inherited the rights to other television projects originally produced by Paramount. Viacom and CBS eventually re-merged in 2019 to form ViacomCBS.

== See also ==
- List of Christmas films
- List of films about angels
