= Andy Wolk =

American television and theatre director

- Occupation(s): Director and writer
- Years active: 1987–present

Andy Wolk is an American television and theatre director.

His television credits include Tales of the Crypt, The Sopranos, Arli$$, The Practice, The Division, Medium, Ugly Betty, and Criminal Minds, as well as a number of television films.

Wolk wrote two plays with Camera Obscura, a theatre company based in Jamestown, New York, that were performed during the 1970s at La MaMa Experimental Theatre Club in the East Village of Manhattan. The first, Oracles, is based in Greek mythology and was produced in 1973. The second, Maldoror, is based on Comte de Lautreaumont's Les Chants de Maldoror and was produced in 1974. Camera Obscura also took Oracles on tour in Europe in 1973 and Maldoror on tour in Europe in 1974. He has also directed theatre, including plays at the Manhattan Theatre Club, Ensemble Studio Theatre, and Actors Theatre of Louisville.

In 1989, Wolk won a Writers Guild of America Award for writing the Great Performances episode "Tales from the Hollywood Hills: Natica Jackson".

== Partial filmography ==
- Criminal Justice (1990)
- Traces of Red (1992)
- Kiss and Tell (1996)
- All Lies End in Murder (1997)
- Alibi (1997)
- The Defenders: Payback (1997)
- The Defenders: Choice of Evils (1998)
- The Defenders: Taking the First (1998)
- Mr. Rock 'n' Roll: The Alan Freed Story (1999)
- Deliberate Intent (2000)
- A Town Without Christmas (2001)
- The Christmas Shoes (2002)
- Finding John Christmas (2003)
- When Angels Come to Town (2004)
- Pizza My Heart (2005)
- A Stranger's Heart (2007)
- Bluff City Law (2019)
- Station 19 (2020)
- Manifest (2020)
