= A Town Without Christmas =

- Written by: Michael J. Murray
- Directed by: Andy Wolk
- Starring: Patricia Heaton; Rick Roberts; Ernie Hudson; Peter Falk
- Theme music composer: Lawrence Shragge
- Country of origin: United States
- Original language: English

Production
- Running time: 91 minutes

Original release
- Network: CBS
- Release: December 16, 2001

Related
- Finding John Christmas (2003)

A Town Without Christmas is an American made-for-television drama film. It was broadcast on CBS on December 16, 2001. The film was the first of a trilogy with subsequent sequels, Finding John Christmas (2003) and When Angels Come to Town (2004) also being aired on CBS. Peter Falk returned to play the role of the angel Max for both sequels.

== Plot ==
Chris, a young boy in the Pacific Northwest town of Seacliff, Washington, goes missing. Before he disappears, he writes a letter to Santa Claus, wishing that he would no longer exist in order to not trouble his divorcing parents.

Concerned that Chris is in danger of taking his own life, locals set out to find the missing child. Among them are struggling writer David Reynolds (Rick Roberts), jaded big-city reporter M.J. Jensen (Patricia Heaton), and Max (Peter Falk), a kind yet mysterious elderly man (who is actually an angel in disguise; the character is featured in two later movies).

== Cast ==
- Patricia Heaton as M.J. Jensen
- Rick Roberts as David Reynolds
- Ernie Hudson as Ted
- Isabella Fink as Megan
- Jeffrey R. Smith as Syd
- Daniel Kash as Mayor Dennis
- Marnie McPhail as Isabel
- Peter Falk as Max
- Justin Blackburn as Young David
- Cassie MacDonald as Brittany
- Jeremy Akerman as Sheriff Bridges
- Nigel Bennett as Literary Agent
- Faith Ward as Mrs. Hargrave
- Stacy Smith as Rhonda (as Stacey Smith)
- Bill Carr as David's Boss
- Martha Irving as Sally

== See also ==
- List of Christmas films
- List of films about angels
