= The Price of Tomatoes =

- The Dick Powell Show episode
- Peter Falk and Inger Stevens in "The Price of Tomatoes"
- Episode no.: Season 1 Episode 17
- Directed by: David Friedkin
- Written by: Richard Alan Simmons
- Cinematography by: Carl Guthrie
- Original air date: January 16, 1962
- Running time: 51:46

Guest appearances
- Peter Falk as Aristede Fresco; Inger Stevens as Anna Beza

Episode chronology
← Previous "A Time to Die"	Next → "Obituary for Mr. X"

"The Price of Tomatoes" was an American television movie broadcast by NBC on January 16, 1962, as part of the television series, The Dick Powell Show. It was written and produced by Richard Alan Simmons and directed by David Friedkin. Peter Falk starred and won the Emmy Award for outstanding single performance by an actor in a leading role.

== Plot ==
A Greek truck driver, Aristede Fresco (played by Peter Falk), seeks to deliver a shipment of tomatoes from El Paso, Texas to Cincinnati, Ohio before his competitor arrives. He is sidetracked when he picks up a pregnant Romanian illegal immigrant, Anna Beza (played by Inger Stevens). She goes into labor and he takes her to the office of a doctor who turns out to be an astrological doctor. He then seeks out a real hospital. After helping her through the birth of her child, Fresco returns to the road and passes his competition.

== Cast ==
The cast included performances by:

- Peter Falk as Aristede Fresco
- Inger Stevens as Anna Beza
- William Challee as Dr. Clement Connell
- Milt Kogan as Jerry Sindell
- Merritt Bohn as Mr. Michaels
- Alejandro Rey as Perez
- Hank Weaver as Casey
- Robert Hoy as Officer
- Robert Kelljan as Dr. Rubell
- Nancy Millard as Nurse

== Production ==
The production was broadcast by NBC on January 16, 1962, as part of the television series, The Dick Powell Show. It was written and produced by Richard Alan Simmons and directed by David Friedkin. Carl Guthrie was the director of photography, and J. M. Van Tamelen was the art director.

== Reception ==
Peter Falk won the Emmy Award for outstanding single performance by an actor in a leading role. The production also received Emmy nominations for Inger Stevens for outstanding single performance by an actress in a leading role and for Richard Alan Simmons for outstanding writing achievement in drama.
