= Jack Lait =

American journalist, author, and playwright (1883–1954)

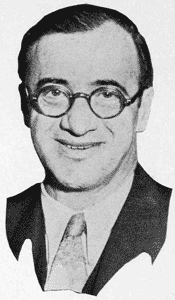
Jack Lait

Jack Lait (March 13, 1883 – April 1, 1954) was an American journalist, author and playwright. During a 50-year career he wrote prolifically and became renowned as one of the leading newspapermen of the first half of the 20th century. He is perhaps best known as co-author, with Lee Mortimer, of the controversial "Confidential" books, written in the late 1940s and early 1950s.

== Early years ==
Jacquin Leonard Lait was born March 13, 1883, in New York City. His family then moved to Chicago, where Lait grew up. He went to grammar school but skipped high school and took a number of jobs before entering the Lewis Institute, where he graduated. Soon afterwards he began his journalistic career, working as a picture messenger for Chicago newspapers.

== Journalistic career ==
Lait's first reporting job was for the Chicago American. He readily adapted to the newspaper world of gangland-era Chicago, quickly learning the ins and outs of the police beat. Developing a knack for sensational reportage, he moved rapidly through the Hearst newspaper ranks from reporter to columnist and from editor to executive. He left Hearst for a couple of years and wrote a daily column for the Chicago Tribune. In 1911, he started his own newspaper with Tom Burke, the Chicago Morning Telegraph, but he did not stay at the newspaper long.

In 1921, Lait became an editor of King Features Syndicate in New York. He wrote a syndicated column called All in the Family, which ran for two decades in Hearst papers. He also scripted a comic strip, Gus and Gussie, illustrated by Paul Fung, which ran from April 13, 1925, to February 24, 1930. In 1934 he became managing editor of the New York American and immediately fired his son George to avoid accusations of nepotism. In 1936, Lait was appointed editor of the New York Daily Mirror, succeeding Walter Howey. He remained editor until he went on sick leave in 1952. For 50 years, Lait was associated with the Hearst newspaper organization in one capacity or another. He covered every heavyweight championship fight for 35 years until his illness.

During his tenure as editor of the New York Daily Mirror, the tabloid doubled its circulation and claimed the second highest circulation of any U.S. newspaper. In 1963, nine years after Lait's death, it ceased publication following a strike and was absorbed into the then top-selling paper the New York Daily News.

Lait was known as a taciturn, tireless digger of news stories. In July 1934, as the FBI was closing in on John Dillinger in Chicago, he was on the scene for an exclusive when Dillinger was killed. Lait's story, dispatched to the International News Service in New York, reached that city before even the Chicago papers were aware of what had happened.

He was associated with entertainment newspaper Variety and became the head of the Chicago office as a side job.

== Books ==
He had a bestseller with Beef, Iron, and Wine featuring stories of the underworld.

=== The "Confidential" Books ===
In the late 1940s and early 1950s, Lait, with co-author Lee Mortimer, wrote a series of four controversial books detailing the seamy underside of America and three of its main cities. Each of the four books had the word "confidential" in its title. Mortimer was a New York Daily Mirror newspaper columnist whom Lait had hired in the 1930s when he was editor. The first book to appear was New York Confidential: The Lowdown on Its Bright Life, published in 1948. Chicago Confidential (1950) and Washington Confidential (1951) followed soon afterwards, with U.S.A. Confidential appearing in 1952. The books sold very well, and Washington Confidential became a bestseller in 1951.

The books garnered much criticism in the press and elsewhere for their sensational, salacious tone and "nonfactual accounts of alleged crime-politics links, vice and scandal." In The New York Times review U.S.A. Confidential was labeled "a rather hard-breathing lecture on coast-to-coast depravity that represents about as discouraging a picture of America as you can find at the moment." Several lawsuits were filed against Lait and Mortimer due to the "Confidential" books. Perhaps the most prominent lawsuit was by the Neiman Marcus Co., which alleged that it and its employees had been libeled in U.S.A. Confidential. Neiman sought damages totaling $7,400,000. In August 1952, a federal judge dismissed the suits on the grounds that plaintiffs had not been sufficiently identified in the book to claim damages. In April 1953, Lait and Mortimer counter-sued seeking $1,500,000 for "conspiracy and agreement to restrain commerce, and suppress the printing, publication and distribution" of the book.

Sixty-three years after its publication Washington Confidential was described in an account as an "infamous guide to the D.C. demimonde" written by "a pair of right-wing hacks determined to peel back the city's white-frosted veneer to expose a fetid underbelly of Communist sympathizers, Chinese bookies, call girls, Mafiosi, and homosexuals." It adds that while the book drips with disdain, it's "an underhanded ethnography rich in fascinating period detail."

Lait and Mortimer's books inspired the films New York Confidential (1955) and Chicago Confidential (1957) and the television series New York Confidential.

== Other writing ==
=== Plays ===
In the summer of 1913 he was persuaded by Wilson Mizner and Paul Armstrong to write his first play, Help Wanted, which was a big success.

=== Films ===
He wrote some silent films for Texas Guinan and Wallace Reid and also worked on a freelance basis on screenplays.

=== Songs ===
He wrote several songs, including in collaboration with Con Conrad.

== Vaudeville ==
He became an impresario working with William Morris organizing vaudeville shows at the American Music Hall in Chicago, including Harry Lauder's tours of the US and Annette Kellermann's first US appearance.

In the early 1920s he became a writer for vaudeville acts, including Sophie Tucker, Emma Carus and Georgie Price, with up to 30 acts playing at the same time.

== Politics ==
He was a political adviser to Franklin D. Roosevelt when he was governor of New York.

== Personal life and death ==
Lait married Laura Belle Leusch on March 6, 1906. Together they had a daughter, Lois, and two sons, Jack Lait Jr., who became the radio and television editor at the Los Angeles Examiner, and George Lait, a director of publicity at Columbia Pictures.

Lait was bedridden for 18 months from October 1952 and went into a coma before he died April 1, 1954, of a circulatory ailment at his home in Beverly Hills, California, at the age of 71. He was survived by his wife and his three children.

== Works ==
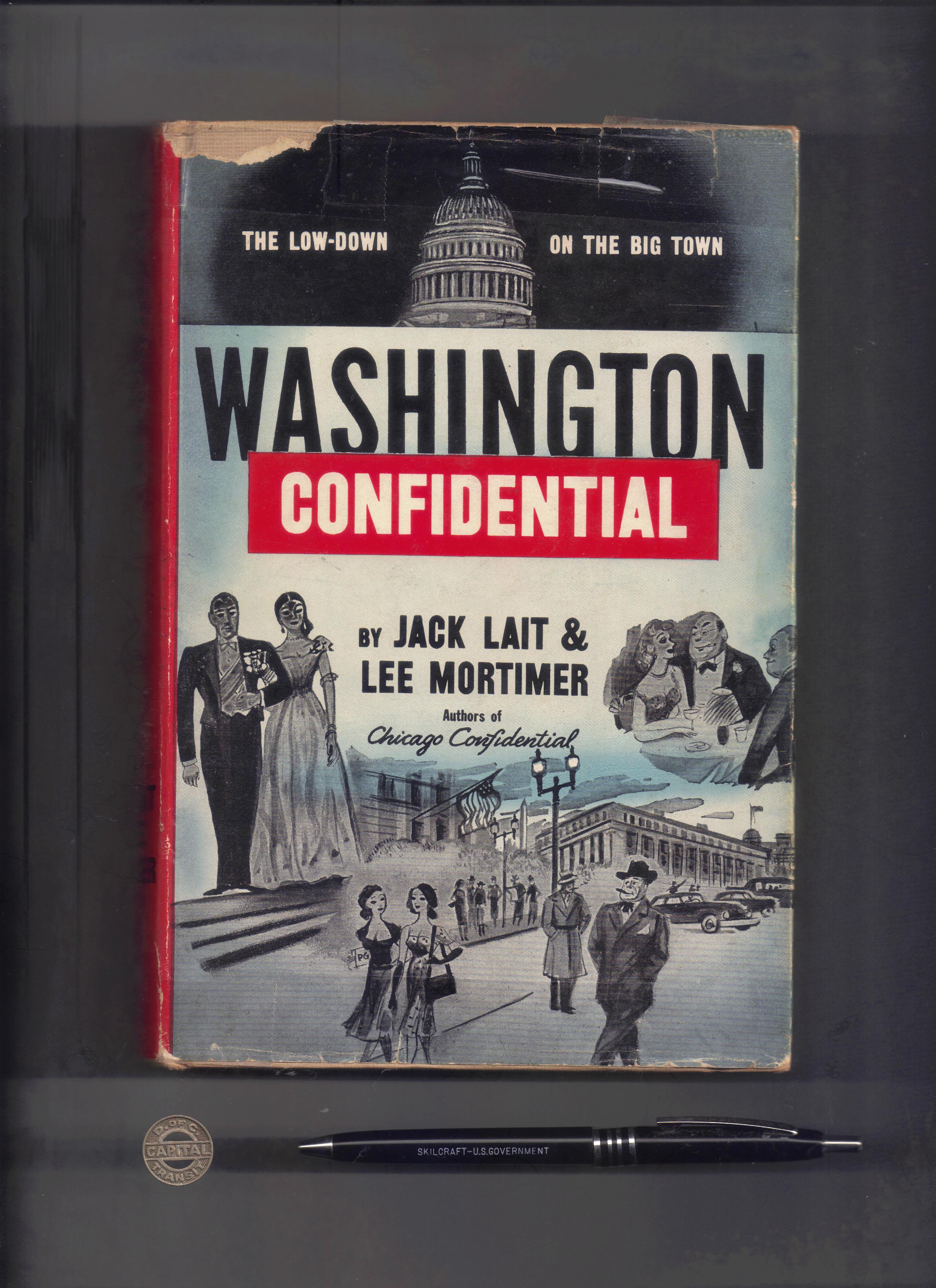
Washington confidential by Jack Lait and Lee Mortimer

=== Plays ===
- Help Wanted, February 11, 1914 - May 1914
- One of Us, September 9, 1918 - Sep 1918
- Spice of 1922, [Original, Musical, Revue] July 6, 1922 - Sep 9, 1922
- Rufus LeMaire's Affairs, [Original, Musical, Revue] March 28, 1927 - May 1927
- The Hook-up, May 7, 1935 - May 1935

=== Books ===
- Beef, Iron, and Wine (Garden City, NY: Doubleday, Page & Co., 1916)
- The Broadway Melody (New York: Grosset & Dunlap, 1929); novelization of the Edmund Goulding film scenario The Broadway Melody
- The Big House (New York: Grosset & Dunlap, 1930); novelization of the Frances Marion and George Hill film scenario The Big House
- Gangster Girl (New York: Grosset & Dunlap, 1930)
- Put on the Spot (New York: Grosset & Dunlap, 1930); basis of 1931 film Bad Company
- The Beast of the City (New York: Grosset & Dunlap, 1932); novelization of the screenplay by W.R. Burnett
- Our Will Rogers (New York: Greenberg, 1935)
- New York Confidential, The Lowdown on Its Bright Life (with co-author Lee Mortimer) (Chicago: Ziff-Davis, 1948)
- Washington Confidential (with Mortimer) (New York: Crown Publishers, 1951)
- Chicago Confidential (with Mortimer) (New York: Crown Publishers, 1950)
- U.S.A. Confidential (with Mortimer) (New York: Crown Publishers, 1952)
