= New York Confidential (book) =

1948 book by Lait and Mortimer

New York Confidential!
- Title page for New York Confidential! (1948)
- Author: Jack Lait; Lee Mortimer
- Language: English
- Genre: Non-fiction
- Publisher: Crown Publishers
- Publication date: 1948
- Publication place: United States

New York Confidential! is a 1948 book written by Jack Lait and Lee Mortimer (Crown Publishers). It was written as a "travel guide" describing lurid things such as "reefer parties", house of prostitution, gambling dives, gay parties and organized crime.

== Synopsis ==
The book is divided into four parts, "The Places", "The People", "The Lowdown" and "Behind the Scenes".

== In popular culture ==
Film producer Edward Small acquired the rights to make a 1955 film based on chapter 25, "Hoodlums' Hierarchy"; the film declaring it was "suggested by" the title.

In 1958 producer Leon Fromkess made a television series "based on" the same title.
