= New York Confidential (film) =

1955 film by Russell Rouse

- Theatrical release poster
- Directed by: Russell Rouse
- Screenplay by: Clarence Greene; Russell Rouse
- Based on: New York: Confidential! by Jack Lait; Lee Mortimer
- Produced by: Clarence Greene; Edward Small
- Starring: Broderick Crawford; Richard Conte; Marilyn Maxwell; Anne Bancroft; J. Carrol Naish
- Narrated by: Ralph Clanton
- Cinematography: Eddie Fitzgerald
- Edited by: Grant Whytock
- Music by: Joseph Mullendore
- Production company: Edward Small Productions
- Distributed by: Warner Bros. Pictures
- Release date: February 18, 1955 (United States)
- Running time: 88 minutes
- Country: United States
- Language: English
- Box office: $1.3 million (US)

New York Confidential is a 1955 film noir crime film directed by Russell Rouse starring Broderick Crawford, Richard Conte, Marilyn Maxwell, Anne Bancroft and J. Carrol Naish. Produced by Edward Small for release by Warner Bros. Pictures, the film was inspired by the 1948 book New York: Confidential! by Jack Lait and Lee Mortimer.

== Plot ==
Charlie Lupo is a gangster who runs the New York branch of a crime syndicate. He is a widower with a worried mother, a grown daughter, Kathy, and a new lover, Iris.

Hit man Nick Magellan of the Chicago mob impresses Lupo, who hires Nick to be his bodyguard. They form a friendship and Kathy is attracted to Nick, but he resists her advances out of respect for Lupo.

When a political lobbyist interferes with the syndicate's plans and must be eliminated, Lupo arranges for three men to handle it. But they leave too many clues and themselves have to be taken care of, a task Lupo turns over to Nick.

Nick quickly dispatches two of the targets, but a third flees and, in return for ratting out Lupo to the authorities, manages to arrange a deal for himself. The gangster hides out while legal negotiations concerning the charge for which Lupo will go to prison go on.

Kathy, having fled her father's home in an attempt to make an independent life, is drawn back in when the police, and reporters, track her down at her job. She shows up at Nick's, clearly intoxicated, to tell him how her life has fallen apart. She throws herself at him but he rejects her. Later, she is killed in a single-car crash. The newspaper headline suggests suicide.

Lupo is devastated; his heart no longer in his work, he decides to cooperate with the authorities. The syndicate determines that he must be eliminated and Nick is ordered to do it. He does the job but, as a matter of "insurance", he in turn is killed.

== Cast ==
- Broderick Crawford as Charlie Lupo
- Richard Conte as Nick Magellan
- Marilyn Maxwell as Iris Palmer
- Anne Bancroft as Katherine Lupo
- J. Carrol Naish as Ben Dagajanian
- Onslow Stevens as Johnny Achilles
- Barry Kelley as Robert Frawley
- Mike Mazurki as Arnie Wendler
- Celia Lovsky as Mama Lupo
- Herbert Heyes as James Marshall
- Steven Geray as Morris Franklin
- William "Bill" Phillips as Whitey
- Tom Powers as District Attorney Rossi
- John Doucette as Shorty

== Production ==
Edward Small bought the rights to the book in 1953. He assigned it to the team of Clarence Greene and Russell Rouse, who had a six-picture deal with Small. Greene and Rouse wanted George Raft and Paul Muni to star.

== Reception ==
The staff at Variety magazine praised the cast in their review of the film, "Among crime exposes New York Confidential stacks up as one of the better-made entries, thanks to a well-fashioned story and good performances by a cast of familiar names ... Conte does a topnotch job of making a coldblooded killer seem real and Crawford is good as the chairman of the crime board, as is Marilyn Maxwell as his girl friend. Anne Bancroft, showing continuing progress and talent, scores with a standout performance of Crawford's unhappy daughter."

The Chicago Tribune reviewer was uncomplimentary: "The script is thin and tossed together for maximum melodramatic effect and has little to offer other than rapid-fire murder. Either New York elevators are awfully slow or the police awfully fast. In one scene, two gangsters leave a body in a hotel room. It's still undiscovered as they step into the elevator, but before they reach the main floor, the alarm has been given and police surround the building. Speedy, huh? Unless you want your children instructed in the fine points of brutality and bloodshed, leave them at home."

Modern critic Dennis Schwartz was disappointed in the film. In 2004 he wrote, "Russell Rouse's New York Confidential is a crime thriller that is a formulaic exposé of the rackets, and is not quite as good as another such film—The Enforcer ... New York Confidential was never exciting, tense or eye-opening. Its narrative was a cliché-driven mob story that was only mildly diverting and even though the performances were energetically delivered, it still tasted like a stale salami sandwich."

== See also ==
- List of American films of 1955
