= Jack Gage (director) =

Film director

Jack Gage (December 26, 1912 – January 4, 1989) was an American film and television director.

From 1934 to 1940, and billed as John Gordon Gage, he worked as a stage manager and occasional actor on Broadway. In 1942, he began his career in films as a dialogue director; his credits in that capacity include I Married a Witch, Double Indemnity, A Stolen Life, Sister Kenny, and Mourning Becomes Electra, the latter two films starring Rosalind Russell.

After directing the feature The Velvet Touch, also starring Russell, Gage turned to the emerging medium of television. His small-screen credits include an adaptation of Jane Eyre for Studio One, the comedy series The Egg and I, the drama series Foreign Intrigue, Schlitz Playhouse of Stars, the documentary series You Are There, and The New Adventures of Charlie Chan.
