= The Dick Powell Show =

American television series

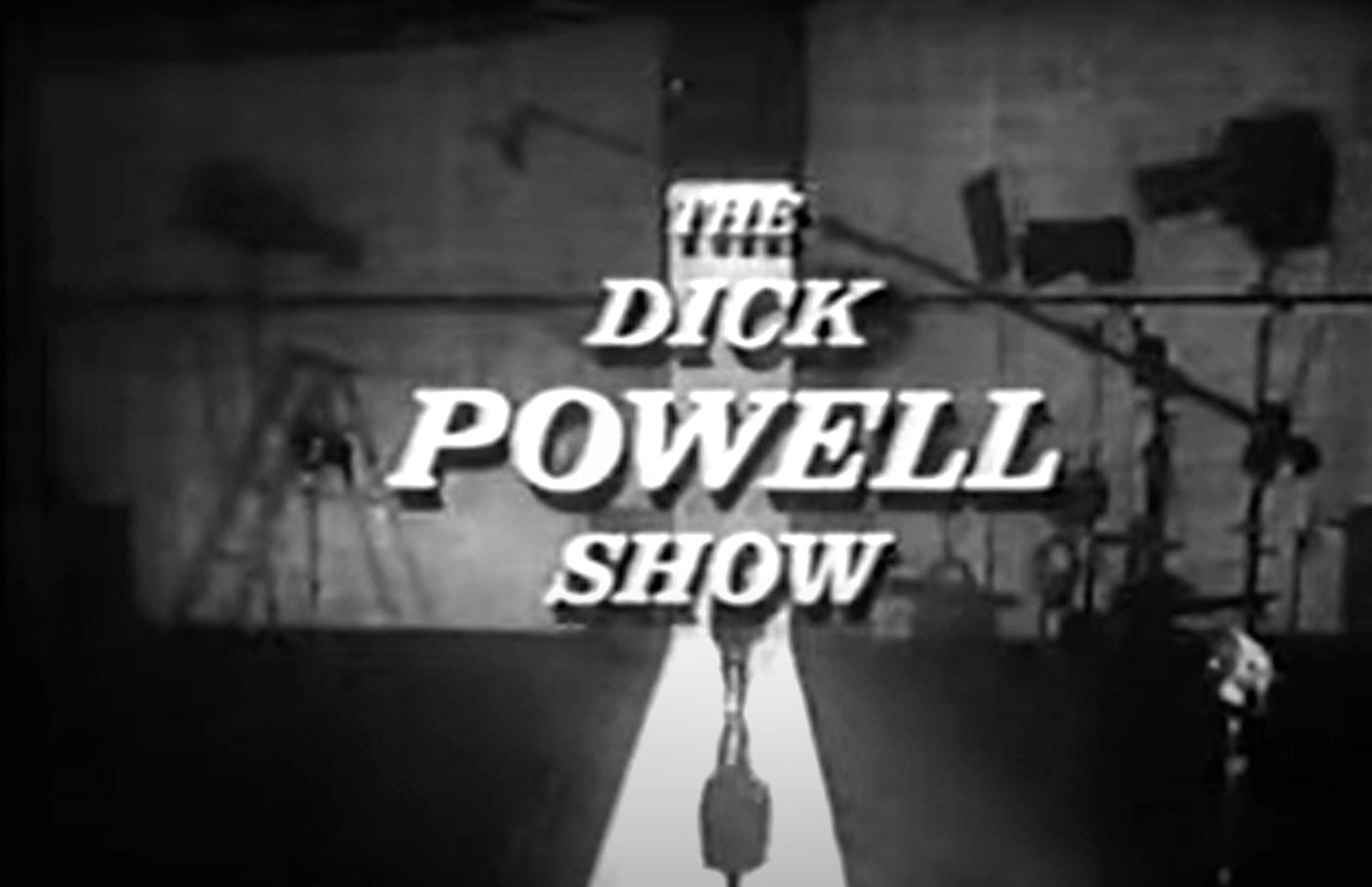
- Title Card
- Also known as: The Dick Powell Theatre
- Directed by: Blake Edwards, Sam Peckinpah, Ralph Nelson, Arthur Hiller, Robert Ellis Miller, Lewis Allen, Ray Milland, Buzz Kulik, Don Medford
- Starring: Dick Powell; Milton Berle; Charles Boyer; Jackie Cooper; Glenn Ford; Rock Hudson; Jack Lemmon; Dean Martin; Steve McQueen; Robert Mitchum; David Niven; Gregory Peck; Frank Sinatra; Robert Taylor; Danny Thomas; Robert Vaughn; Robert Wagner; Jeanne Carmen; John Wayne
- Composer: Herschel Burke Gilbert
- Country of origin: United States
- No. of episodes: 60

Production
- Running time: 45–48 minutes
- Production company: Four Star Television

Original release
- Network: NBC
- Release: September 26, 1961 – April 30, 1963

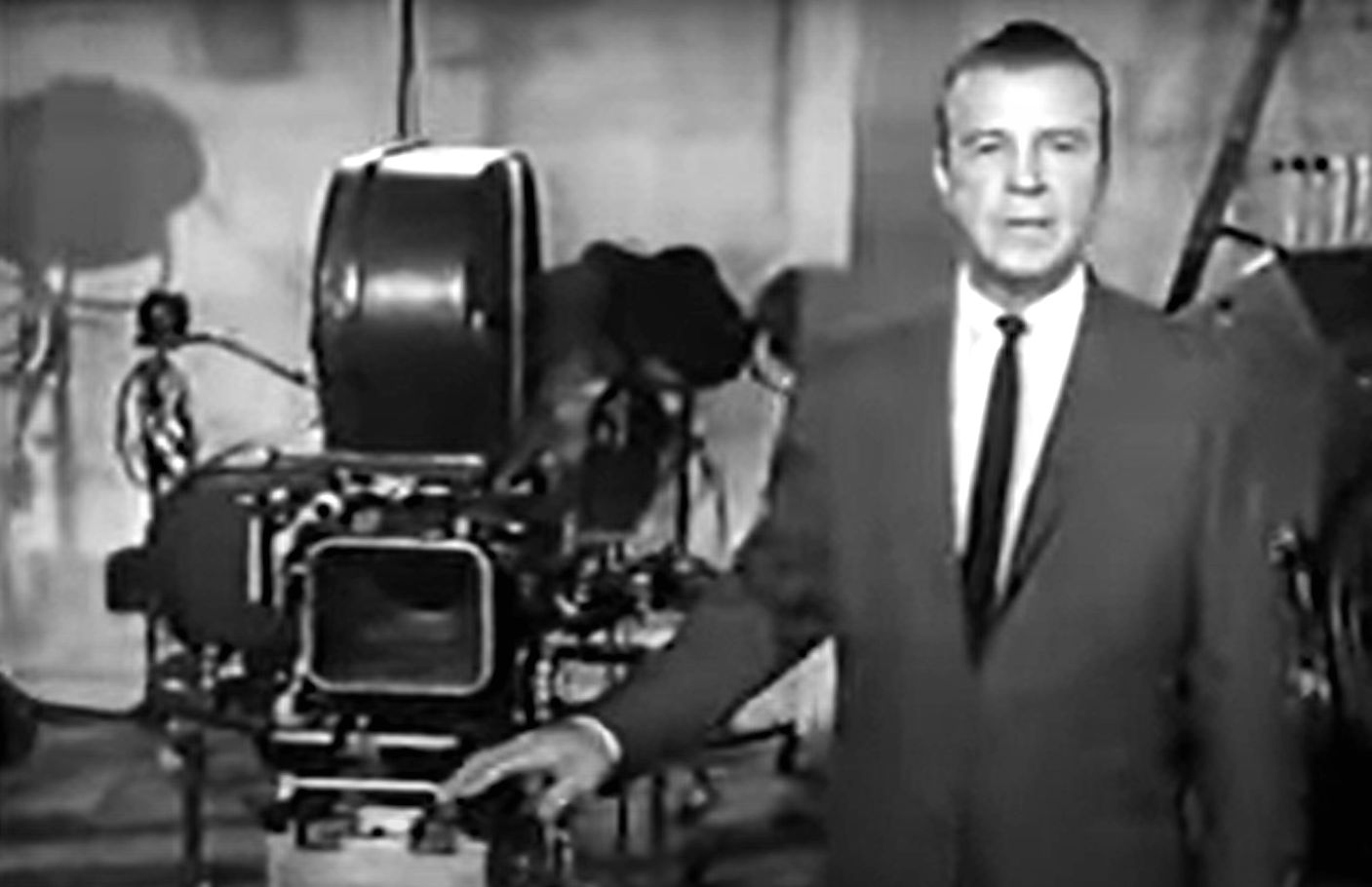
Dick Powell performing the introduction to "The Play Tonight", in which he introduced the performers.

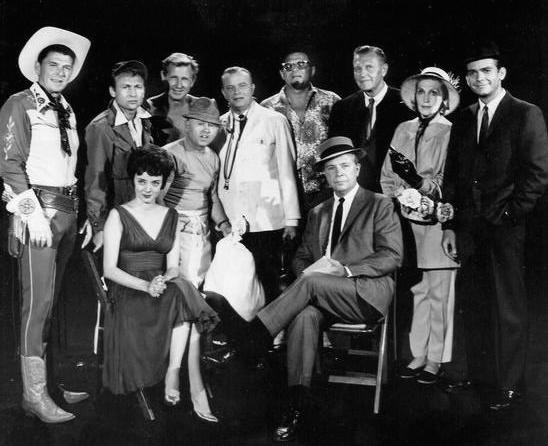
Guest stars for the premiere episode, "Who Killed Julie Greer?": Standing, from left: Ronald Reagan, Nick Adams, Lloyd Bridges, Mickey Rooney, Edgar Bergen, Jack Carson, Ralph Bellamy, Kay Thompson, Dean Jones, seated, from left, Carolyn Jones and Dick Powell

The Dick Powell Show is an American television anthology series that aired on NBC from September 26, 1961, until September 17, 1963, primarily sponsored by the Reynolds Metals Company.

== Overview ==
The series was an anthology of various dramas and comedies. Programs were initially hosted by longtime film star Dick Powell until his death from lung cancer on January 2, 1963, then by a series of guest hosts (under the revised title The Dick Powell Theatre) until the series ended. The first of these hosts was Gregory Peck, who began the January 8 program with a tribute to Powell, recognizing him as "a great and good friend to our industry." Peck was followed by fellow actors such as Robert Mitchum, Frank Sinatra, Ronald Reagan, Glenn Ford, Charles Boyer, Jackie Cooper, Rock Hudson, Milton Berle, Jack Lemmon, Dean Martin, Robert Taylor, Steve McQueen, David Niven, Danny Thomas, Robert Wagner and John Wayne.

It featured many future stars, producers, and directors early in their careers, including Aaron Spelling, Sam Peckinpah and Bruce Geller. Blake Edwards wrote and directed a number of episodes, including two featuring Robert Vaughn as an Ivy League private eye known as "The Boston Terrier". Several episodes, including those featuring The Boston Terrier, doubled as pilots for potential Four Star Television series, including an unsuccessful attempt to revive The Westerner in a modern-day setting, featuring Lee Marvin in Brian Keith's original role. The original pilot episode for Burke's Law ("Who Killed Julie Greer?"), starring Powell as Amos Burke, appeared as the debut episode of this series.

The Dick Powell Show was one of the many productions of Four Star Television. The series' theme, "More Than Love" ("Theme from The Dick Powell Show"), and the majority of musical compositions heard throughout the series were the work of Herschel Burke Gilbert.

== Distribution ==
The Navy Motion Picture Service made The Dick Powell Show available for viewing aboard ships in 1964. Episodes were packaged with episodes of The Untouchables in 108-minute programs on 16-millimeter film.

== Episodes ==
In 1962, Peckinpah directed and co-wrote the episode "Pericles on 31st Street, which featured Theodore Bikel, Carroll O'Connor, Arthur O'Connell, and Strother Martin.
