= Lee Mortimer =

American newspaper columnist

Lee Mortimer (1904–1963) was an American newspaper columnist, radio commentator, crime lecturer, night club show producer, and author.

He was born Mortimer Lieberman in Chicago, but was best known by the pen name he adopted as a young newspaper editor. With Jack Lait, he co-authored a popular series of books detailing crime in the United States, including New York Confidential!, Chicago Confidential, Washington Confidential, and U.S.A. Confidential.

== Early life ==
Mortimer Lieberman (Lee Mortimer) was the eldest son of Nathan and Rose Lieberman, first generation immigrants to the United States. Nathan Lieberman was born October 12, 1873, in Ukraine and emigrated in 1890, taking employment with Sears, Roebuck & Company, and later, Montgomery Ward, selling clothing. In 1918, Nathan Lieberman was employed by Kahn Tailoring Company in Chicago. His wife, Rose, was born in Sweden in 1885, and immigrated to the United States in 1899. The couple had one other child, Robert Lieberman, born in Chicago in 1914, who was a promotions agent for The Chicago Tribune - New York News Syndicate. Nathan Lieberman brought his family to New York in the early 1920s, and founded a clothing firm originally known as Mencher Brothers & Lieberman, a manufacturer of boys' and student's clothing later called Quickturns Company. Nathan Lieberman was actively involved in the operation, serving as general manager of the firm at the time of his death in 1955, at the age of 82.

Mortimer Lieberman attended Northwestern University in Evanston, Illinois, then moved to New York City, going to work as an editor for Amusements Magazine under Donald Flamm and adopting the pen name Lee Mortimer. Broadway columnist Walter Winchell, in a March 12, 1931, column, called out Mortimer for having reported that Winchell was changing newspapers, reporting that Mortimer, "an up and coming youngster now editing Amusements for Donald Flamm, goes a little gay with facts too, however, when he reports that I am shifting rags."

== Newspaper and radio ==
In 1932, Mortimer began his long-term association with the New York Mirror, working for editor Jack Lait, with whom he later penned a series of bestselling crime books. At the Mirror, Mortimer was installed as a reporter and critic, and later began a long-running Broadway gossip column. His association with Marcus Loew's theater publicist and nightclub impresario Nils Granlund led to introductions to speakeasy club owners of the Prohibition Era, as sources for his Broadway material.

Mortimer found a close ally in Nils Granlund, who managed WHN radio and broadcast live jazz performances from NYC nightclubs, and by 1939, Mortimer had his own radio program on WMCA, a station owned by Flamm. Mortimer made appearances regularly at Granlund-staged events, and eventually produced Granlund-style dance revues for New York City nightclubs.

== On crime ==
Mortimer served as a first lieutenant in the Signal Corps from 1942 to 1943, then returned to New York City and began a collaboration with Jack Lait that produced several bestselling crime books. Following that success, Mortimer began lecturing on crime and communism, and at one point attempted to tie popular singer Frank Sinatra to the Mafia and the Communist Party. The two men had a confrontation outside Ciro's nightclub in Hollywood on April 9, 1947 (New York Times, Sinatra Held For Trial, April 10, 1947).

== Author ==
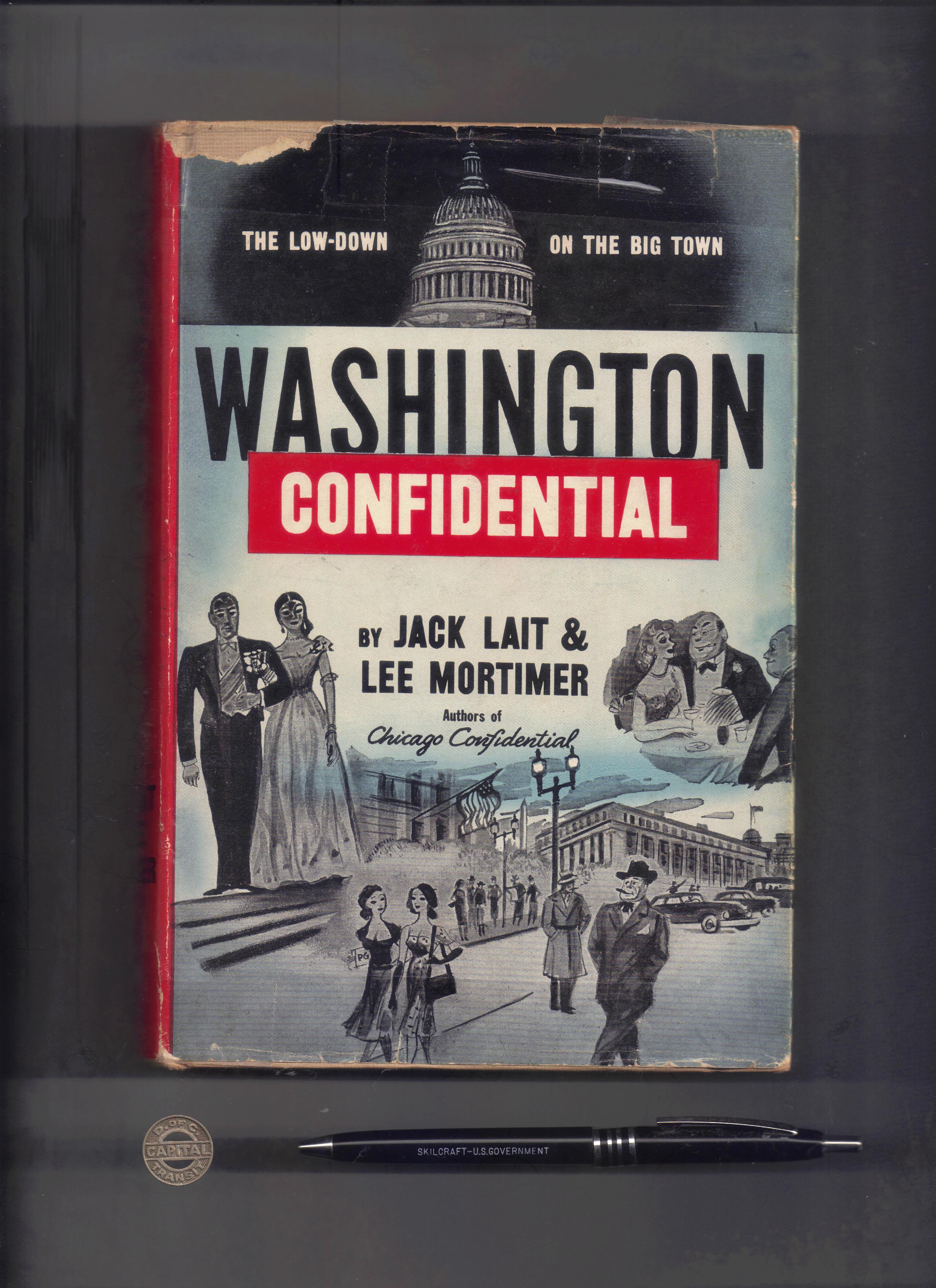
"Washington confidential" by Jack Lait and Lee Mortimer

With Jack Lait, Mortimer wrote a series of books, including "New York: Confidential," "Washington: Confidential," "Chicago: Confidential," "U.S.A. Confidential", and the science fiction short story "Mars Confidential". On his own, he wrote "New York Behind the Scenes" and "Women: Confidential." Following the publication of "U.S.A.: Confidential," Mortimer and Lait were charged in separate libel lawsuits by Margaret Chase Smith and Augustine B. Kelley, members of Congress. The $500,000 suit by Kelley was settled after Mortimer and the estate of Jack Lait offered written apologies and paid costs associated with the litigation.

== Personal life ==
Mortimer wed five times, including marriages to Gerry Pascal, Patricia Whitney, Una Wyse, Ann Koga, and Mariko Harada.

Mortimer died of a heart attack in New York City on March 1, 1963.
