= 20th Golden Raspberry Awards =

Award ceremony presented by the Golden Raspberry Award Foundation in 1999

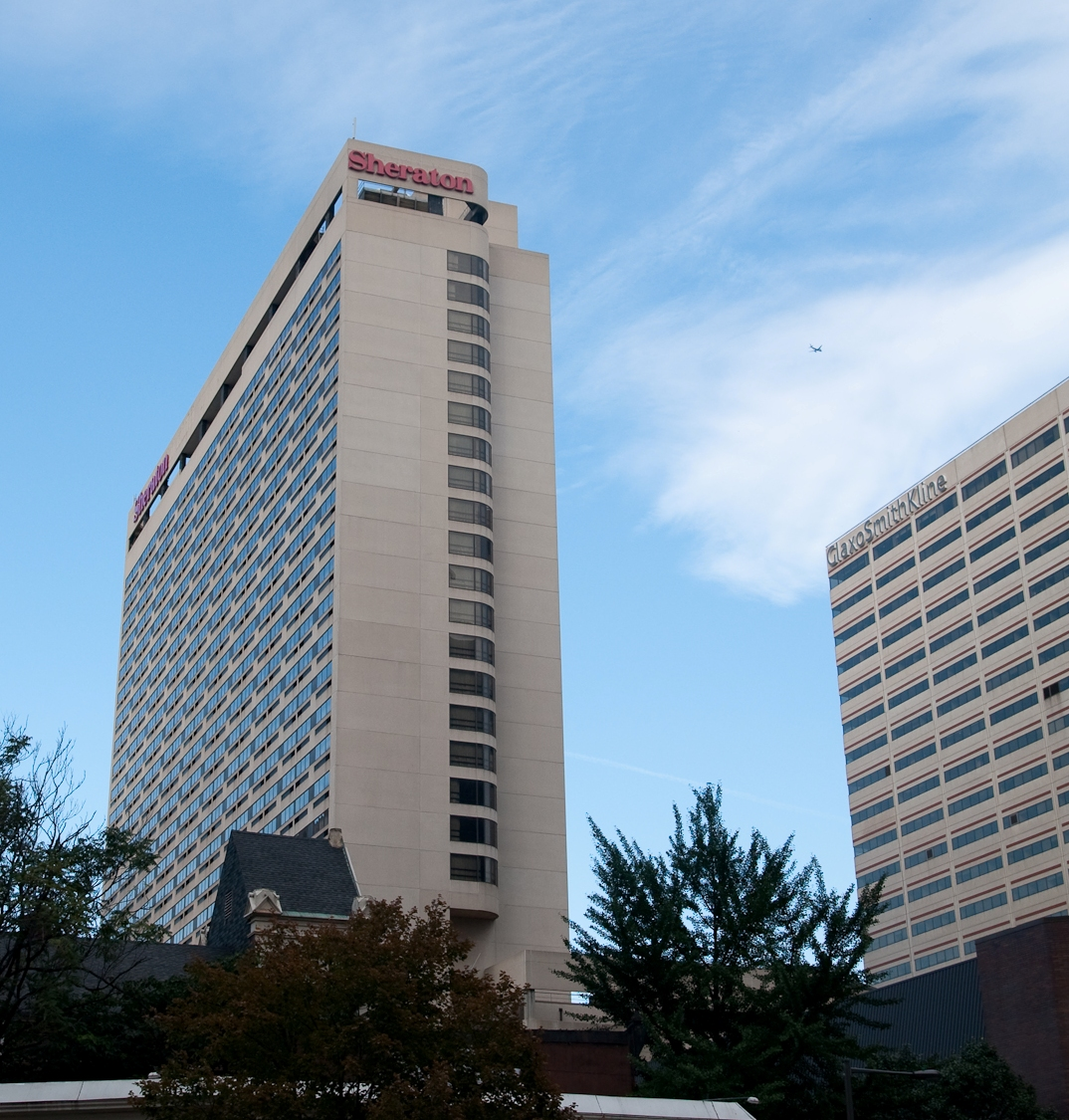
- The 20th Golden Raspberry Awards ceremony was held at the Sheraton Hotel.
- Date: March 25, 2000
- Site: Sheraton Hotel, Santa Monica, California

Highlights
- Worst Picture: Wild Wild West
- Most awards: Wild Wild West (5)
- Most nominations: Wild Wild West (9)

The 20th Golden Raspberry Awards were held on March 25, 2000 at the Sheraton Hotel in Santa Monica, California to recognize the worst the film industry had to offer in 1999.

Included with the normal Golden Raspberry categories to mark the dawn of the year 2000 were four special awards: Worst Picture of the Decade, Worst New Star of the Decade, Worst Actor of the Century, and Worst Actress of the Century.

Robert Conrad, who played the lead role of James T. West in the 1960s television series The Wild Wild West, created by Michael Garrison, showed up at the ceremony, as a way of expressing his disapproval with the film adaptation. He accepted three awards on behalf of the cinematic version of Wild Wild West, including Worst Picture.

== Awards and nominations ==
Winner (in bold)
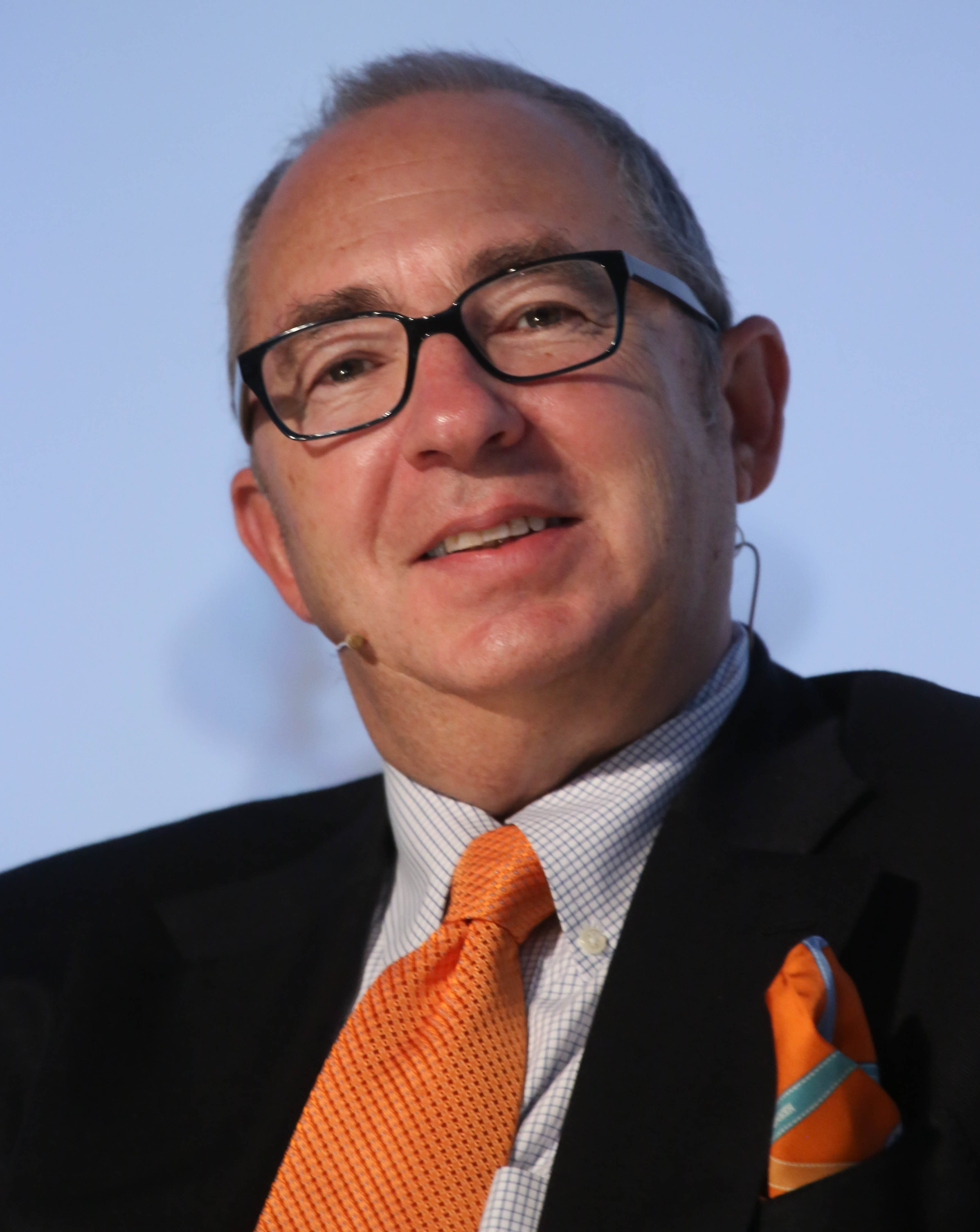
Barry Sonnenfeld, Worst Director winner

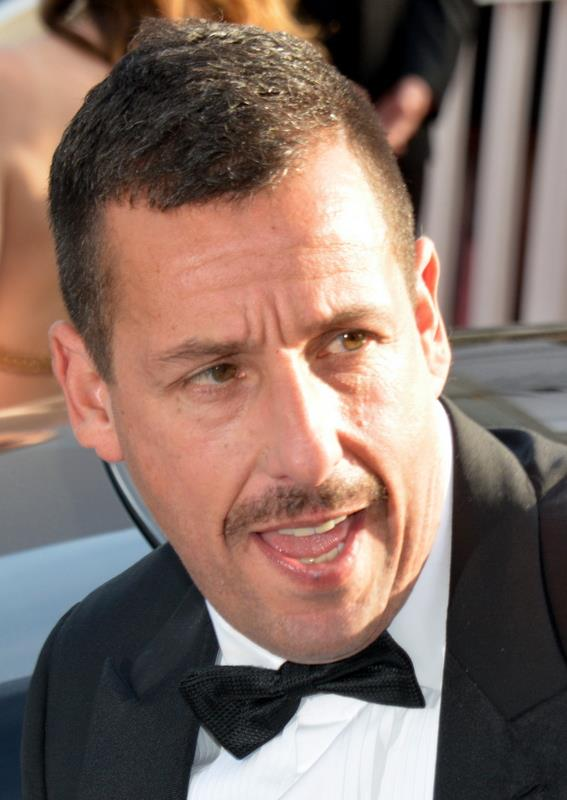
Adam Sandler, Worst Actor winner

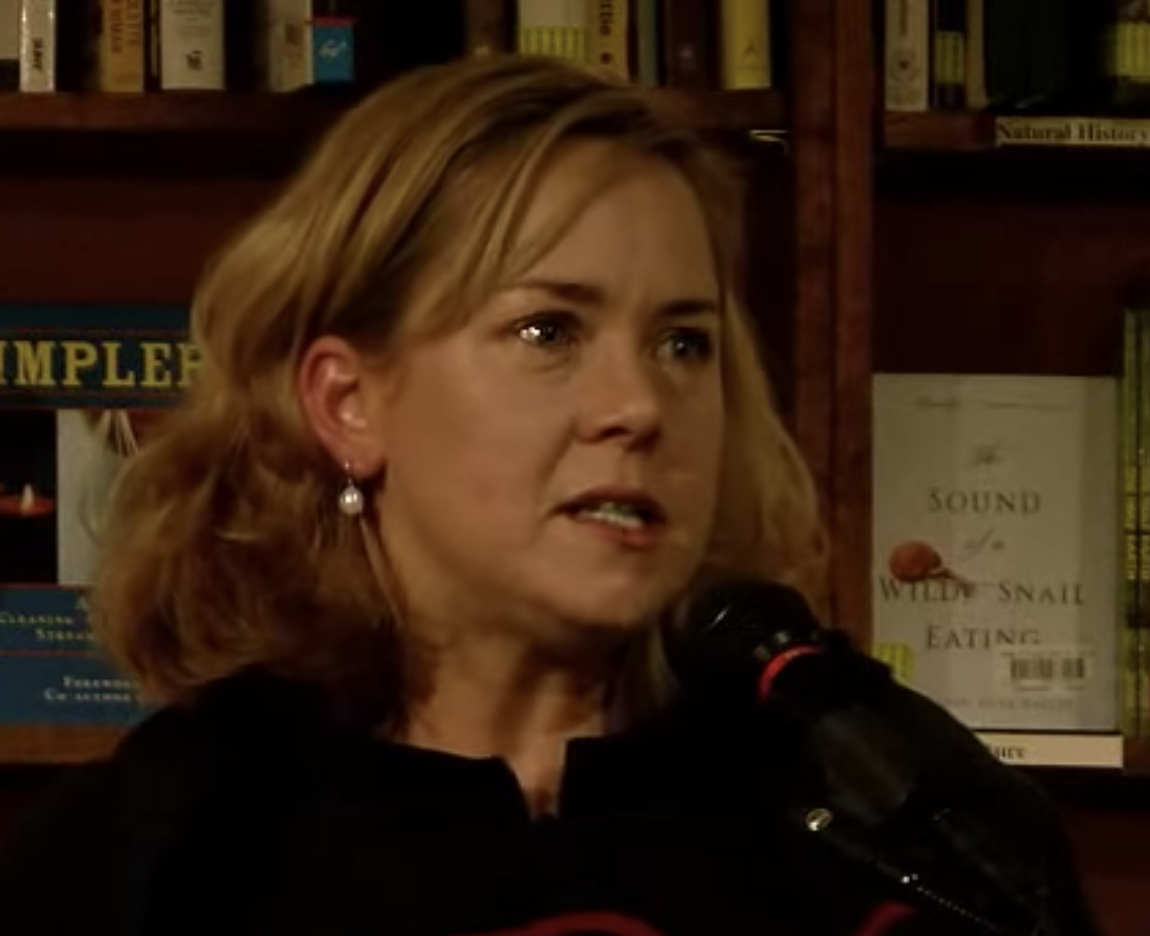
Heather Donahue, Worst Actress winner

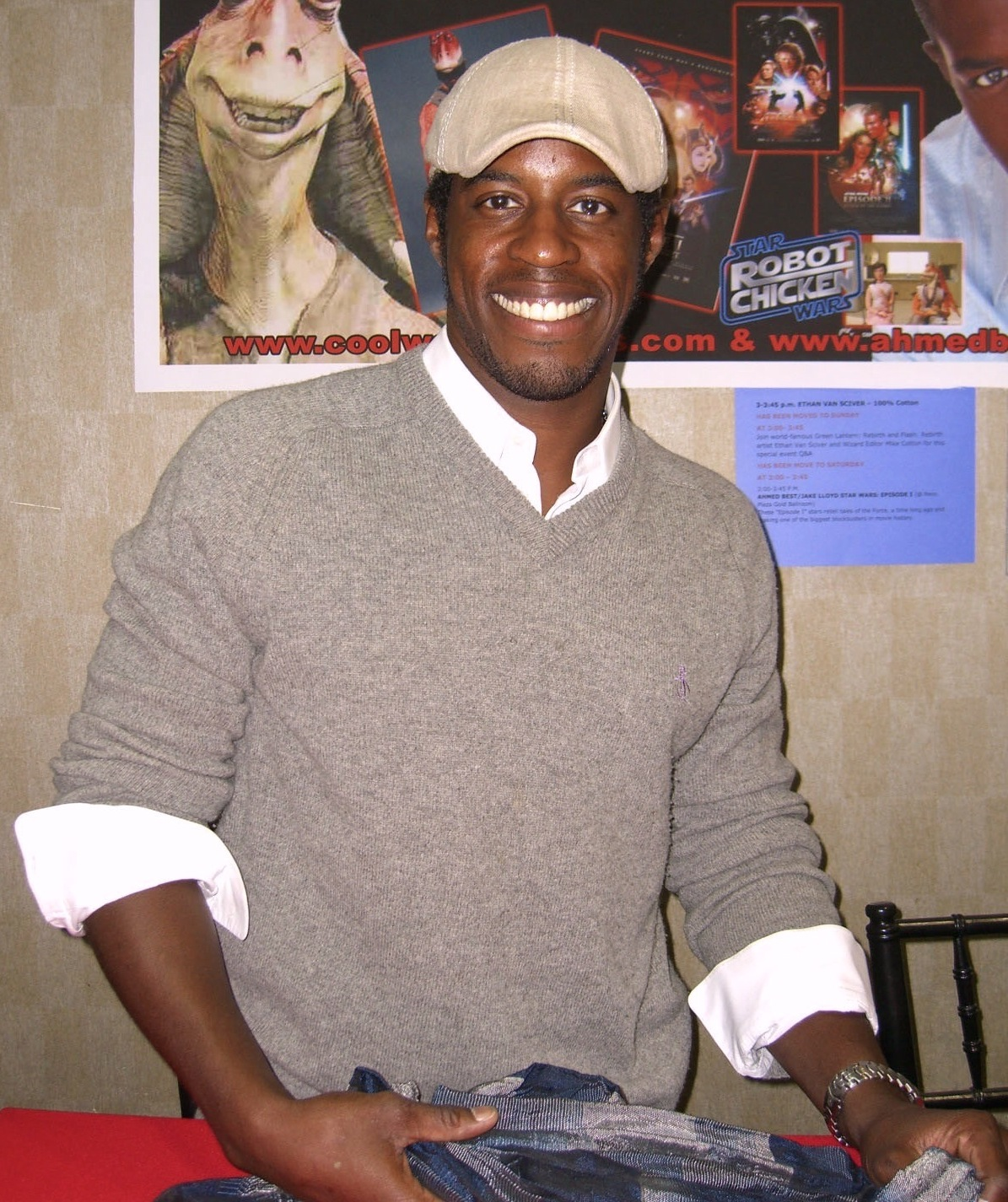
Ahmed Best, Worst Supporting Actor winner

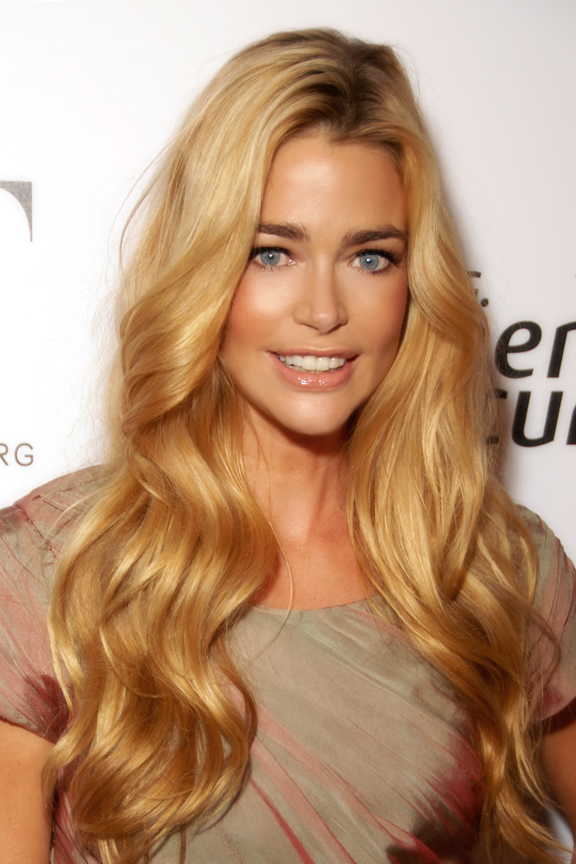
Denise Richards, Worst Supporting Actress winner

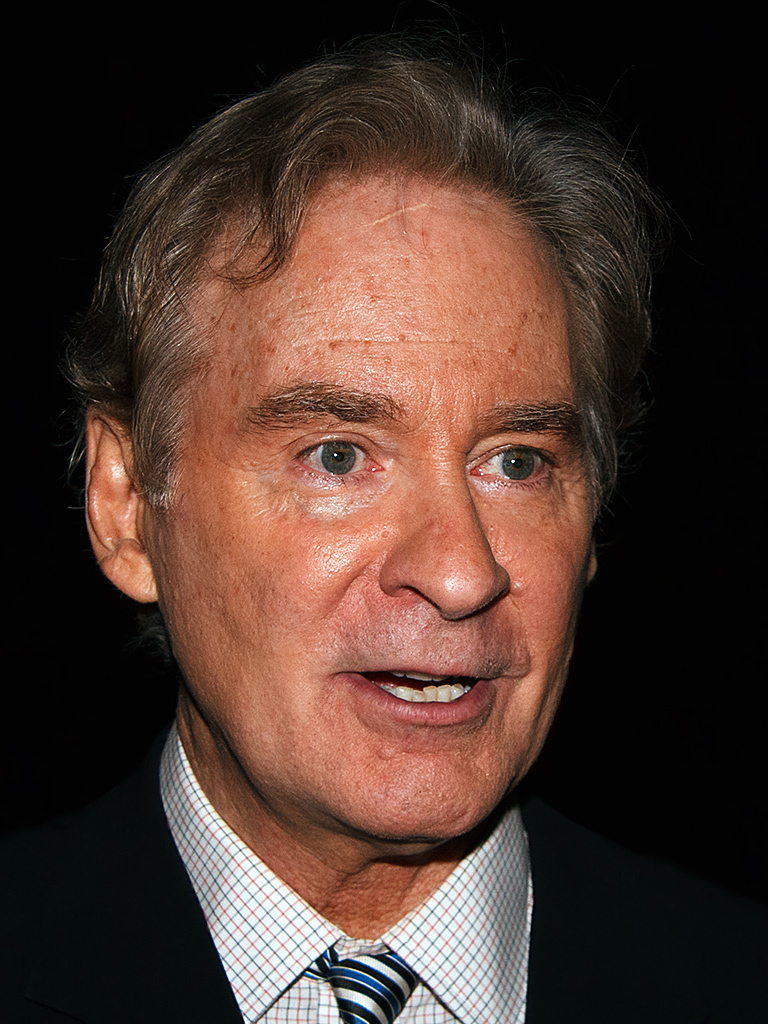
Kevin Kline, Worst Screen Couple co-winner

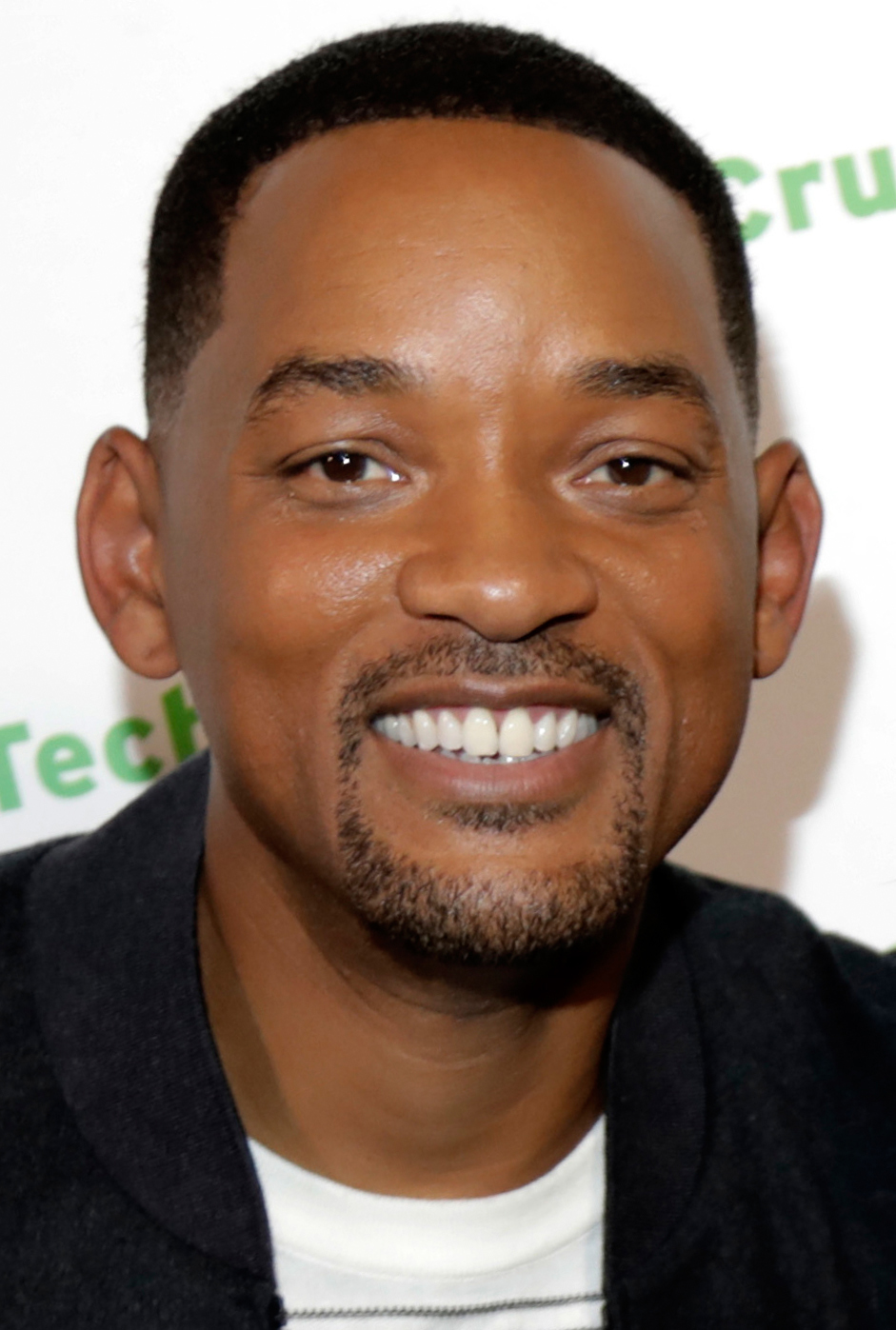
Will Smith, Worst Screen Couple and Worst Original Song co-winner

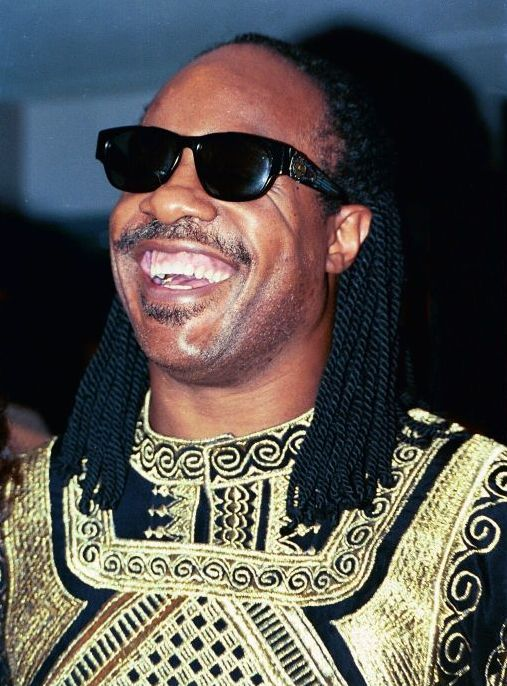
Stevie Wonder, Worst Original Song co-winner

Category	Recipient
Worst Picture	**Wild Wild West (Warner Bros.)**
Worst Picture	Big Daddy (Columbia)
Worst Picture	The Blair Witch Project (Artisan)
Worst Picture	The Haunting (DreamWorks)
Worst Picture	Star Wars: Episode I – The Phantom Menace (Fox)
Worst Actor	**Adam Sandler in Big Daddy as Sonny Koufax**
Worst Actor	Kevin Costner in For Love of the Game and Message in a Bottle as Billy Chapel and Garret Blake (respectively)
Worst Actor	Kevin Kline in Wild Wild West as Artemus Gordon
Worst Actor	Arnold Schwarzenegger in End of Days as Jericho Cane
Worst Actor	Robin Williams in Bicentennial Man and Jakob the Liar as Andrew Martin and Jakob Heym (respectively)
Worst Actress	**Heather Donahue in The Blair Witch Project as Heather**
Worst Actress	Melanie Griffith in Crazy in Alabama as Lucille Vinson
Worst Actress	Milla Jovovich in The Messenger: The Story of Joan of Arc as Joan of Arc
Worst Actress	Sharon Stone in Gloria as Gloria
Worst Actress	Catherine Zeta-Jones in Entrapment and The Haunting as Virginia Baker and Theo (respectively)
Worst Supporting Actor	**Ahmed Best in Star Wars: Episode I – The Phantom Menace as Jar Jar Binks**
Worst Supporting Actor	Kenneth Branagh in Wild Wild West as Dr. Arliss Loveless
Worst Supporting Actor	Gabriel Byrne in End of Days and Stigmata as Satan and Father Andrew Kiernan (respectively)
Worst Supporting Actor	Jake Lloyd in Star Wars: Episode I – The Phantom Menace as Anakin Skywalker
Worst Supporting Actor	Rob Schneider in Big Daddy as Nazo
Worst Supporting Actress	**Denise Richards in The World Is Not Enough as Christmas Jones**
Worst Supporting Actress	Sofia Coppola in Star Wars: Episode I – The Phantom Menace as Sache
Worst Supporting Actress	Salma Hayek in Dogma and Wild Wild West as Serendipity and Rita Escobar (respectively)
Worst Supporting Actress	Kevin Kline (as a prostitute) in Wild Wild West
Worst Supporting Actress	Juliette Lewis in The Other Sister as Carla Tate
Worst Screen Couple	**Kevin Kline and Will Smith in Wild Wild West**
Worst Screen Couple	Pierce Brosnan and Denise Richards in The World Is Not Enough
Worst Screen Couple	Sean Connery and Catherine Zeta-Jones in Entrapment
Worst Screen Couple	Jake Lloyd and Natalie Portman in Star Wars: Episode I – The Phantom Menace
Worst Screen Couple	Lili Taylor and Catherine Zeta-Jones in The Haunting
Worst Director	**Barry Sonnenfeld for Wild Wild West**
Worst Director	Jan de Bont for The Haunting
Worst Director	Dennis Dugan for Big Daddy
Worst Director	Peter Hyams for End of Days
Worst Director	George Lucas for Star Wars: Episode I – The Phantom Menace
Worst Screenplay	**Wild Wild West, story by Jim Thomas and John Thomas, screenplay by S. S. Wilson, Brent Maddock, Jeffrey Price and Peter S. Seaman, based on the TV series by Michael Garrison**
Worst Screenplay	Big Daddy, screenplay by Steve Franks, Tim Herlihy & Adam Sandler
Worst Screenplay	The Haunting, screenplay by David Self, based on the novel by Shirley Jackson
Worst Screenplay	The Mod Squad, written by Stephen T. Kay, Scott Silver & Kate Lanier, based on the TV series
Worst Screenplay	Star Wars: Episode I – The Phantom Menace, written by George Lucas
Worst Original Song	**"Wild Wild West"** from **Wild Wild West**, music and lyrics by Stevie Wonder, Kool Moe Dee and Will Smith

=== Worst of the Century, Decade ===
Winner (in bold)
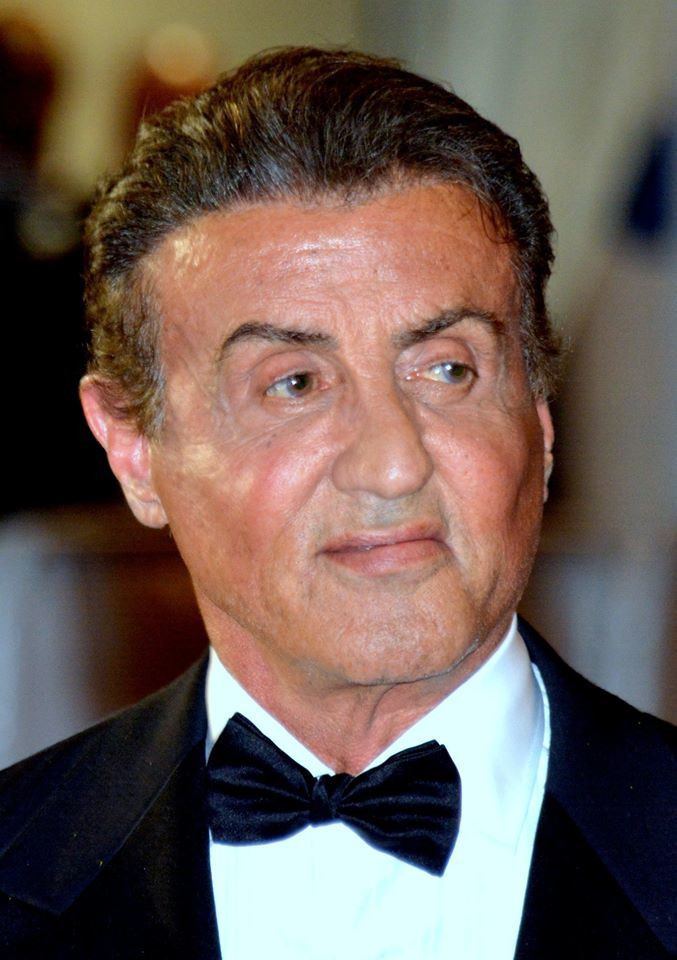
Sylvester Stallone, Worst Actor of the Century winner

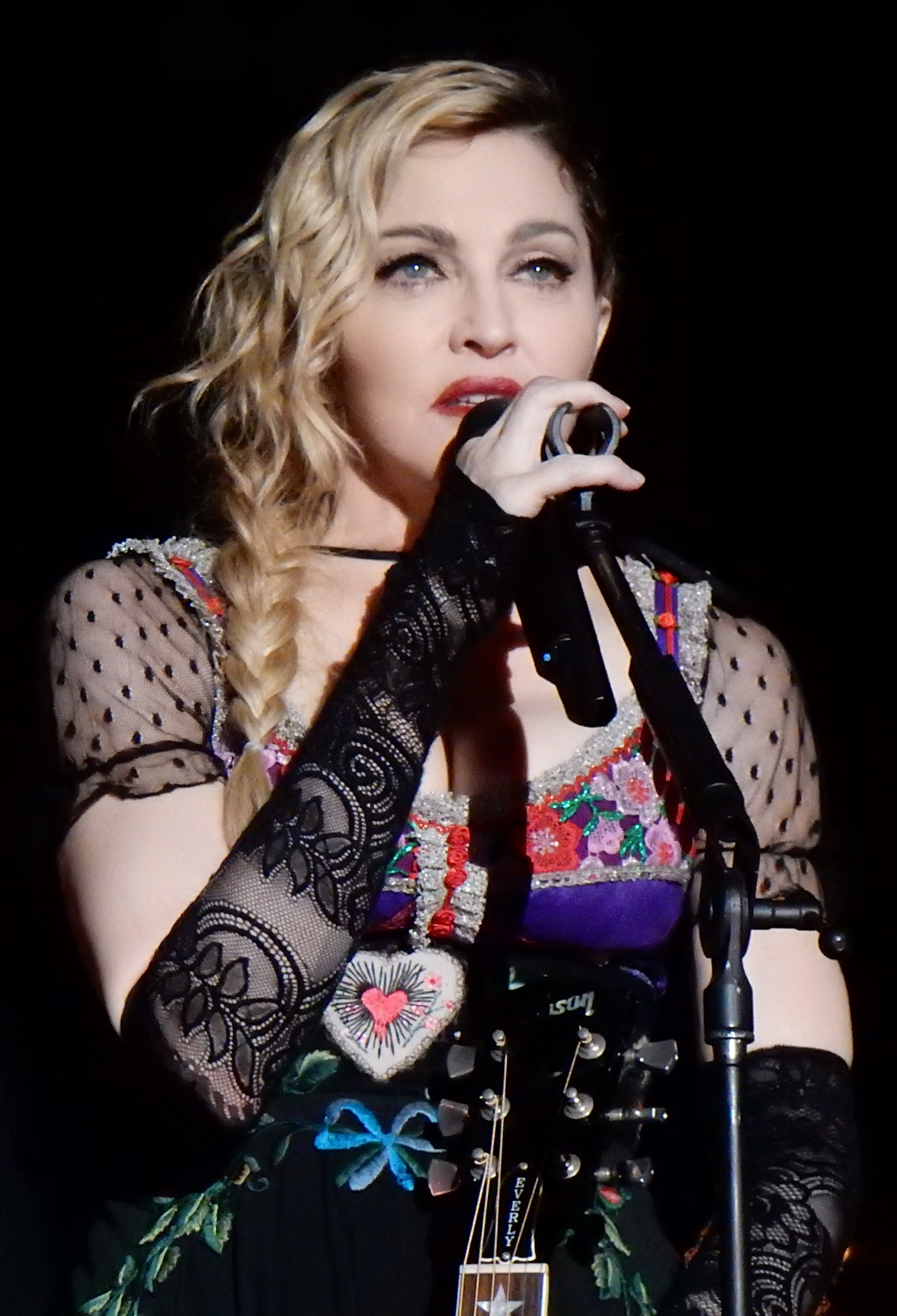
Madonna, Worst Actress of the Century winner

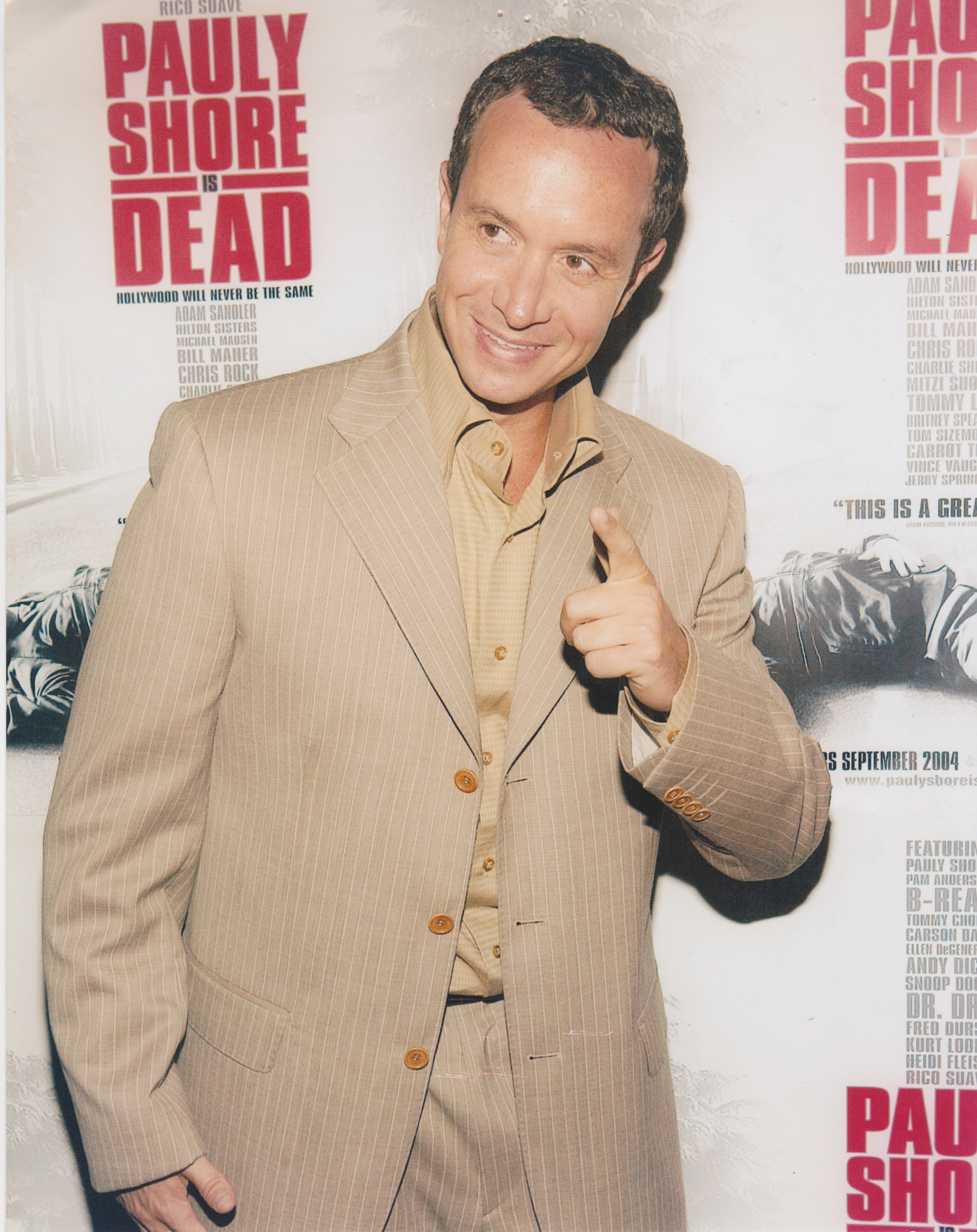
Pauly Shore, Worst New Star of the Decade winner

Category	Recipient
Worst Actor of the Century	**Sylvester Stallone for "99.5% of everything he's EVER done**
Worst Actor of the Century	Kevin Costner for The Postman, Robin Hood: Prince of Thieves, Waterworld, Wyatt Earp, etc.
Worst Actor of the Century	Prince for Graffiti Bridge, Under the Cherry Moon, etc.
Worst Actor of the Century	William Shatner for "Every Star Trek film he was ever in"
Worst Actor of the Century	Pauly Shore for Bio-Dome, Encino Man, Jury Duty, etc.
Worst Actress of the Century	**Madonna for Body of Evidence, Shanghai Surprise, Who's That Girl, etc.**
Worst Actress of the Century	Elizabeth Berkley for Showgirls
Worst Actress of the Century	Bo Derek for Bolero, Ghosts Can't Do It, Tarzan, the Ape Man, etc.
Worst Actress of the Century	Brooke Shields for The Blue Lagoon, Endless Love, Sahara, Speed Zone, etc.
Worst Actress of the Century	Pia Zadora for Butterfly, Fake-Out, The Lonely Lady, Voyage of the Rock Aliens, etc.
Worst Picture of the Decade	**Showgirls (1995, United Artists) (winner of 7 1995 Razzies)**
Worst Picture of the Decade	An Alan Smithee Film: Burn Hollywood Burn (1998, Hollywood Pictures) (winner of 5 1998 Razzies)
Worst Picture of the Decade	Hudson Hawk (1991, TriStar) (winner of 3 1991 Razzies)
Worst Picture of the Decade	The Postman (1997, Warner Bros.) (winner of 5 1997 Razzies)
Worst Picture of the Decade	Striptease (1996, Columbia and Castle Rock Entertainment) (winner of 6 1996 Razzies)
Worst New Star of the Decade	**Pauly Shore for Bio-Dome, Encino Man, Jury Duty, Etc.**
Worst New Star of the Decade	Elizabeth Berkley for Showgirls
Worst New Star of the Decade	Ahmed Best for Star Wars: Episode I – The Phantom Menace
Worst New Star of the Decade	Sofia Coppola for The Godfather Part III and Star Wars: Episode I – The Phantom Menace
Worst New Star of the Decade	Dennis Rodman for Double Team and Simon Sez

== Films with multiple nominations ==
These films received multiple nominations:

Nominations	Films
9	Wild Wild West
7	Star Wars: Episode I – The Phantom Menace
5	Big Daddy
5	The Haunting
3	End of Days
2	The Blair Witch Project
2	Entrapment
2	The World Is Not Enough

== Criticism ==
The awards are often criticized for nominating Heather Donahue for Worst Actress for her role in The Blair Witch Project. GQ said it was "a ridiculous sham of an anti-Oscars ceremony" Donahue said as an experience it "still sucked as a young actress who felt totally unprepared for how enormous the movie had become."

== See also ==
- 1999 in film
- 72nd Academy Awards
- 53rd British Academy Film Awards
- 57th Golden Globe Awards
- 6th Screen Actors Guild Awards
