= Wild Wild West =

1999 film by Barry Sonnenfeld

- Theatrical release poster
- Directed by: Barry Sonnenfeld
- Screenplay by: S. S. Wilson; Brent Maddock; Jeffrey Price Peter S. Seaman
- Story by: Jim Thomas; John Thomas
- Based on: The Wild Wild West by Michael Garrison
- Produced by: Jon Peters; Barry Sonnenfeld
- Starring: Will Smith; Kevin Kline; Kenneth Branagh; Salma Hayek; Ted Levine
- Cinematography: Michael Ballhaus
- Edited by: Jim Miller
- Music by: Elmer Bernstein
- Production companies: Peters Entertainment; Sonnenfeld-Josephson Worldwide Entertainment
- Distributed by: Warner Bros.
- Release date: June 30, 1999 (United States)
- Running time: 106 minutes
- Country: United States
- Language: English
- Budget: $170 million
- Box office: $222.1 million

Wild Wild West is a 1999 American steampunk Western comedy film directed by Barry Sonnenfeld from a screenplay by S. S. Wilson and Brent Maddock along with Jeffrey Price and Peter S. Seaman, based on a story by Jim and John Thomas. Adapting the 1960s television series The Wild Wild West by Michael Garrison, the film respectively stars Will Smith and Kevin Kline (in a dual role) as Jim West and Artemus Gordon, two government agents in the American Old West who attempt to protect President Ulysses S. Grant and the United States from a mad scientist bent on revenge for losing the American Civil War. Kenneth Branagh, Salma Hayek and Ted Levine also appear in supporting roles.

Development for the film began in 1992, when Warner Bros. optioned the rights to the television series, and hired Richard Donner and Shane Black to respectively direct and script the film, with Mel Gibson in the role of Jim West. After Donner and Gibson left the project to work on Maverick in 1994, Sonnenfeld and Smith, after completing work on Men in Black for Columbia Pictures, came aboard the film in February 1997, with principal photography beginning the following year in April. The film's extensive visual effects were helmed by Eric Brevig at Industrial Light & Magic. The film's soundtrack contains the theme song of the same name, written and performed by Smith, as well as the score, composed by Western film score veteran Elmer Bernstein.

Released theatrically in the United States on June 30, 1999 and produced on a $170 million budget (making it one of the most expensive films ever made when adjusting for inflation at the time of its release), Wild Wild West was a critical and commercial failure, grossing only $113.8 million domestically and $108.3 million overseas for a worldwide total of $222.1 million. The film was nominated for eight Razzies and won five at the 20th Golden Raspberry Awards, including Worst Picture.

== Plot ==
Four years after the end of the American Civil War in 1869, U.S. Army Captain James T. "Jim" West and U.S. Marshal Artemus Gordon hunt for ex-Confederate General "Bloodbath" McGrath, who is seemingly responsible for a massacre in New Liberty that killed West's parents. U.S. President Ulysses S. Grant informs the two about the disappearances of America's key scientists and a treasonous plot by McGrath, and tasks them with finding the scientists before he inaugurates the first transcontinental railroad.

Aboard their train The Wanderer, West and Gordon examine the severed head of MIT scientist Thaddeus Morton, finding a clue that leads them to Dr. Arliss Loveless, a legless ex-Confederate soldier and scientist. Infiltrating Loveless's party, the duo rescue a woman named Rita Escobar, who asks for their help in rescuing her father Guillermo Escobar, who is one of the kidnapped scientists. Loveless demonstrates his steam-powered tank by using McGrath's soldiers as target practice, before shooting and leaving McGrath for dead for previously surrendering at Appomattox. West, Gordon and Rita find McGrath, who reveals he was framed by Loveless for the New Liberty massacre before dying. The trio pursue Loveless on The Wanderer, only to discover Loveless is following them on an artillery train. West disables Loveless's train before Rita accidentally incapacitates West, Gordon and herself with sleeping gas disguised as billiard balls.

West and Gordon wake up as Loveless pulls away in The Wanderer while taking Rita hostage, intending to capture Grant at the golden spike ceremony and leaving West and Gordon in a deadly trap. After narrowly escaping the trap, the duo stumble across Loveless's private railroad leading to his industrial complex hidden in Spider Canyon, where they witness Loveless's ultimate weapon, a gigantic mechanical spider with nitroglycerin cannons. At the ceremony, Loveless captures Grant and a disguised Gordon while West gets shot by one of Loveless's henchwomen upon being caught infiltrating the spider.

At his complex, Loveless reveals his plan to dissolve the United States and divide the territory among Great Britain, France, Spain, Mexico, the Native American people and Loveless himself. When Grant refuses to surrender, Loveless orders Gordon's execution before West, having survived thanks to Gordon's impermeable bulletproof vest, appears in disguise as a belly dancer and distracts Loveless, allowing Gordon to free the captives. Loveless then escapes while taking Grant with him, and destroys a town to force Grant to surrender. Gordon, describing Bernoulli's principle, uses his flying bicycle to transport him and West to the spider, where West battles its henchmen before confronting Loveless himself. As the spider approaches a cliff, Loveless shoots West with a concealed gun, but instead hits the spider's control pipes, halting it abruptly at the edge of the canyon. West and Loveless fall from the spider, but West survives by catching a chain dangling from the machinery.

Grant designates West and Gordon as the first agents of his new Secret Service. After Grant departs on The Wanderer, West and Gordon attempt to court Rita, who reveals Guillermo is actually her husband. West and Gordon ride into the sunset on the spider.

== Cast ==
- Will Smith as U.S. Army Captain James T. "Jim" West, a Union army Captain assigned to bring down Loveless
- Kevin Kline in a dual role as:
  - U.S. Marshal Artemus Gordon, a federal agent and clever inventor working with West
  - U.S. President Ulysses S. Grant, the former Union Army commander and 18th President of the United States
- Kenneth Branagh as Dr. Arliss Loveless, a former Confederate soldier now a revolutionary terrorist
- Salma Hayek as Rita Escobar, Professor Escobar's reckless wife who attempted to infiltrate Loveless's organization
- Ted Levine as General "Bloodbath" McGrath, a Confederate vetaran who lost his ear and seeks to restart the Civil War
- M. Emmet Walsh as US Marshal Coleman, a federal agent and Gordon's train conductor
- Bai Ling as Miss Mae Lee East, one of Dr. Arliss Loveless's female bodyguards
- Rodney A. Grant as Hudson
- Buck Taylor as Eye-Crossed Reb
- Garcelle Beauvais as Belle
- Musetta Vander as Munitia, one of Dr. Arliss Loveless's female bodyguards
- Sofia Eng as Miss Lippenreider, one of Dr. Arliss Loveless's female bodyguards who is able to read lips from a distance
- Frederique van der Wal as Amazonia, one of Dr. Arliss Loveless's female bodyguards
- Gary Carlos Cervantes as Professor Guillermo Escobar, an MIT scientist kidnapped by Loveless
- Michael Sims as Professor Thaddeus Morton, a deceased MIT metallurgist who was kidnapped by Loveless
- Jerry Potter as Plantation Owner George Washington at Gala
- Ian Abercrombie as British Dignitary
- Ismael 'East' Carlo as Mexican Dignitary
- Orestes Matacena as Spanish Dignitary
- Christian Aubert as French Dignitary
- E.J. Callahan as Allan Pinkerton
- Debra Christofferson as Dora Lookalike
- Scott Sandler as Young Joe Finnegan (uncredited)
- Derek Mears as "Metal Head" (uncredited)
- David Lea as Thug With Knife (uncredited)

== Production ==
=== Development ===
Variety first reported in January 1992 that Warner Bros. Pictures had optioned the film rights to Michael Garrison's television show The Wild Wild West and hired Richard Donner, who previously directed three episodes of the original series, to direct a film adaptation written by Shane Black, with Mel Gibson in the role of Jim West. However, Donner and Gibson left the project to work on a film adaptation of Maverick (another film based on a Western television series) in 1994. The project continued in the development stage, with Tom Cruise rumored for the lead in 1995. Cruise instead starred in a film adaptation of Mission: Impossible the following year.

Discussions with Will Smith and Barry Sonnenfeld began in February 1997 after the two had wrapped up production on Men in Black for Columbia Pictures the same year. Smith declined to play the lead role of Neo in The Matrix in favor of Wild Wild West, which he later regretted. Warner Bros. pursued George Clooney to co-star in the film as Artemus Gordon, with Kevin Kline, Matthew McConaughey and Johnny Depp also in contention for the role while Short Circuit and Tremors screenwriters S. S. Wilson and Brent Maddock were hired by the studio to script the film between April and May 1997. Clooney signed on the following August after dropping out of Jack Frost, while Wilson and Maddock's script was rewritten by the writing team of Jeffrey Price and Peter S. Seaman. However, in December 1997, Clooney was replaced by Kline in the role of Gordon after an agreement with Sonnenfeld: "Ultimately, we all decided that rather than damage this project trying to retrofit the role for me, it was better to step aside and let them get someone else."

=== Writing ===
The film featured several significant changes from the television series. For instance, Dr. Loveless, as portrayed by Kenneth Branagh in the film, went from a dwarf to a legless man confined in a steam-powered wheelchair similar to that employed by the villain in the episode "The Night of the Brain"; his first name was also changed from Miguelito to Arliss, and he was given the motive of a Southerner who sought the defeat of the North after the Civil War. Kevin Kline plays Artemus Gordon in the film, whose character is similar to the original show's version of him portrayed by Ross Martin, except that he is much more egotistical than Jim West. The film depicted Kline's Gordon creating more bizarre, humorous and implausible inventions than those created by Martin's Gordon in the original series, as well as having an aggressive rivalry with West, unlike in the series where he and West had a very close friendship and trusted each other with their lives. While Gordon did indeed impersonate Grant in three episodes of the series ("The Night of the Steel Assassin", "The Night of the Colonel's Ghost" and "The Night of the Big Blackmail"), they were not played by the same actor. Additionally, West was originally portrayed by Robert Conrad, a Caucasian rather than an African American, which serves as a critical plot point as West's parents were among the victims of Loveless's massacre at New Liberty.

In a 2002 Q&A event on An Evening with Kevin Smith, filmmaker Kevin Smith talked about working as a writer on a fifth Superman film in 1997 titled Superman Lives, revealing that producer Jon Peters requested, among other things, that Superman fight a gigantic spider in the third act. After Batman director Tim Burton came onboard the project, Smith's script was scrapped and Warner Bros. later halted production on Superman Lives in 1998, though Wild Wild West, which Peters produced alongside Sonnenfeld, featured a giant mechanical spider that Dr. Loveless takes control of. Neil Gaiman also revealed that Peters insisted a giant mechanical spider be included in a proposed film adaptation of The Sandman.

=== Filming ===
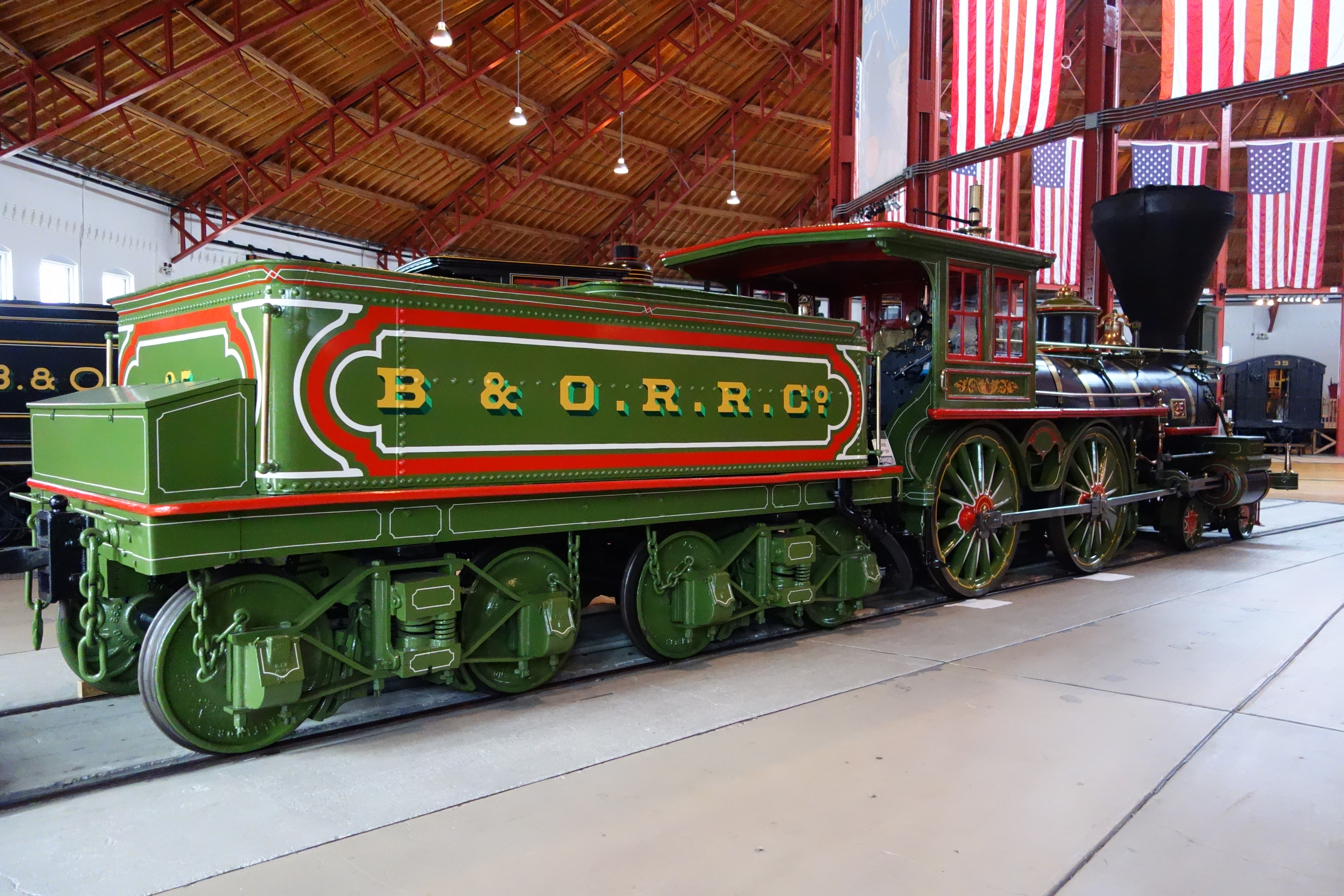
William Mason displayed at National Museum of Railroad History & Innovation

Principal photography was set to begin in January 1998, but was pushed three months later to April 22, 1998. The interior sequences on the trains of both Artemus Gordon and Dr. Loveless were shot on sets at Warner Bros. Studios Burbank, while the exterior sequences were shot in Idaho on the Camas Prairie Railroad. The Wanderer in the film is portrayed by the Baltimore & Ohio 4–4–0 No. 25, one of the oldest operating steam locomotives in the U.S. Built in 1856 at the Mason Machine Works in Taunton, Massachusetts, it was later renamed The William Mason in honor of its manufacturer. During preproduction, the engine was sent to the steam shops at the Strasburg Rail Road for restoration and repainting. The locomotive is brought out for the B&O Train Museum in Baltimore's "Steam Days". Both the William Mason and the Inyo, which was the locomotive used in the original television series, previously appeared in the 1956 Disney film The Great Locomotive Chase.

Much of the Wild West footage was shot around Santa Fe, New Mexico, particularly at the Western town film set at the Cook Movie Ranch (now Cerro Pelon Ranch), which was previously used for the 1985 film Silverado. During the shooting of a sequence involving stunts and pyrotechnics, a planned building fire grew out of control and quickly overwhelmed the local fire crews that were standing by. Much of the town was destroyed before the fire was contained. In the scene where Loveless' spider attacks the town, a chimney reading "Kasdan Iron Monger" is briefly shown as a homage to Silverado director Lawrence Kasdan.

=== Music ===
The orchestral film score, including its main theme, was composed and conducted by Elmer Bernstein, a veteran of many Western film scores such as The Magnificent Seven. The score mainly follows the Western genre's symphonic tradition, while at times also acknowledging the film's anachronistic playfulness by employing a more contemporary music style with notable rock percussion and electronic organ. The score also briefly incorporates Richard Markowitz's theme from the original television series in one cue, which was uncredited in the film and not included on the score's album; ironically, this was one of the film's few elements that were faithful to the series, which also did not credit Markowitz for the theme. Additional parts of the score were composed by Bernstein's son Peter, while his daughter Emilie served as one of the orchestrators and producers.

Like most of his films during this period, Will Smith recorded a hip-hop song based on the film's plot, also titled "Wild Wild West". "Wild Wild West" was a number-one hit on the U.S. pop charts, though it also won a Golden Raspberry Award for Worst Original Song. It was produced by Rob Fusari, who lifted a sample from Stevie Wonder's 1976 hit "I Wish". The song also features guest vocals from R&B group Dru Hill, and was a star-making vehicle for Dru Hill lead singer Sisqó. Old-school rapper Kool Moe Dee had previously recorded a "Wild Wild West" single of his own in 1987, and he reperformed the chorus from his "Wild Wild West" as the chorus of Smith's "Wild Wild West". A performance of the song by Smith, Dee, Dru Hill and Sisqo at the 1999 MTV Movie Awards also included Wonder performing a reprise of the chorus on piano.

==== Score ====
All music is composed by Elmer Bernstein, except as noted.

No.	Title	Length
1.	"Main Title"	3:00
2.	"West Fights"	1:14
3.	"Dismissal"	2:13
4.	"East Meets West"	1:15
5.	"Of Rita, Rescue and Revenge"	5:43
6.	"Trains, Tanks and Frayed Ropes" (Composed by Peter Bernstein)	4:03
7.	"The Cornfield"	1:09
8.	"Loveless's Plan"	4:45
9.	"Goodbye Loveless" (Composed by Peter Bernstein)	4:33
10.	"Ride the Spider"	2:14
Total length:		30:12

=== Score Deluxe Edition ===
All music is composed by Elmer Bernstein, except as noted.

No.	Title	Length
1.	"Blade"	0:51
2.	"Main Title"	2:09
3.	"Punch"	0:28
4.	"West Fights"	1:13
5.	"Of Rita, Rescue and Revenge"	5:43
6.	"Cliffhanger"	0:35
7.	"Whirly Girly"	1:19
8.	"Punch Up"	1:17
9.	"Washington"	0:54
10.	"Dismissed"	2:11
11.	"Man's Head"	1:53
12.	"Waltz First Mansion"	2:52
13.	"Polka"	2:33
14.	"East Meets West"	1:14
15.	"Reeling"	2:34
16.	"Boobies"	0:22
17.	"Rescue"	1:12
18.	"Tank"	0:41
19.	"Tank To Catch"	2:56
20.	"Exit McGrath"	1:29
21.	"Ritaless"	1:18
22.	"Missing Something" (Theme by Elmer Bernstein, Music Composed by Peter Bernstein)	1:59
23.	"Train Attack" (Composed by Peter Bernstein)	2:08
24.	"The Cornfield"	1:08
25.	"Fear"	0:42
26.	"Memories"	0:23
27.	"Spider Canyon"	1:46
28.	"Big Ride (original The Wild Wild West television theme)"	0:27
29.	"Coincidence" (Theme by Elmer Bernstein, Music Composed by Peter Bernstein)	0:51
30.	"Captured"	1:05
31.	"The Plan/America"	2:25
32.	"She Dances"	2:18
33.	"Eight Ball" (Theme by Elmer Bernstein, Music Composed by Peter Bernstein)	1:14
34.	"Avante/Air Gordon" (Theme by Elmer Bernstein, Music Composed by Peter Bernstein)	1:19
35.	"Flying Attack" (Theme by Elmer Bernstein, Music Composed by Peter Bernstein)	1:59
36.	"Knife Guy" (Theme by Elmer Bernstein, Music Composed by Peter Bernstein)	2:30
37.	"Tin Man/Four of a Kind"	2:41
38.	"Last Fight" (Composed by Peter Bernstein)	2:43
39.	"Bye Loveless / Whoopin'" (Theme by Elmer Bernstein, Music Composed by Peter Bernstein)	1:27
40.	"The End (Ride The Spider)"	2:12
41.	"Main Title (alternate version)"	2:09
42.	"1M3 Take 119 (not used in the film)"	2:06
43.	"Whirly Girly Stop (not used in the film)"	0:30
44.	"4M3 R Take 165 (not used in the film)"	1:04
45.	"Flying Attack (alternate version)" (Theme by Elmer Bernstein, Music Composed by Peter Bernstein)	1:51
46.	"The End (Ride The Spider) (alternate version)"	2:12
47.	"Blood on the Saddle / Arise (instrumental)"	1:38
48.	"Camptown Races/Oh Susanna" (Composed by Stephen Foster)	2:21
Total length:		75:09

== Release ==
Upon release on June 30, 1999, alongside the R-rated film South Park: Bigger, Longer & Uncut, another Warner Bros. film that came out (Paramount Pictures distributed the film in the United States & Canada), several news reports arose stating that adolescent moviegoers purchased tickets into seeing the PG-13-rated Wild Wild West in theaters, but instead went to see the South Park film. This was a result of a film industry crackdown that made sneaking into R-rated films tougher for children, as proposed by U.S. President Bill Clinton at the time in response to the moral panic generated by the Columbine High School massacre, which had occurred two months before the release of both films.

=== Marketing ===
Warner Bros. heavily promoted Wild Wild West as an anticipated summer blockbuster instead of Brad Bird's animated film The Iron Giant, which was released two months after Wild Wild West. This sparked controversy as The Iron Giant was becoming more critically successful than the critically-panned Wild Wild West upon release, despite eventually underperforming at the box office due to the studio deciding to spend their money on marketing for Wild Wild West among other films.

=== Home media ===
The film was released on VHS and DVD on November 30, 1999, on LaserDisc on December 28, 1999, and on Blu-ray on May 29, 2011.

== Reception ==
=== Box office ===
Wild Wild West grossed $27,687,484 during its opening weekend, with a total of $40,957,789 for the Independence Day weekend and ranking first at the North American box office. It dropped into second place below American Pie in its second weekend, making $16.8 million. The film ended its theatrical run on October 10, 1999 after five months, having grossed $113,804,681 domestically and $108,300,000 overseas for a worldwide total of $222,104,681 against a production budget of $170 million, making it commercially unsuccessful.

=== Critical response ===
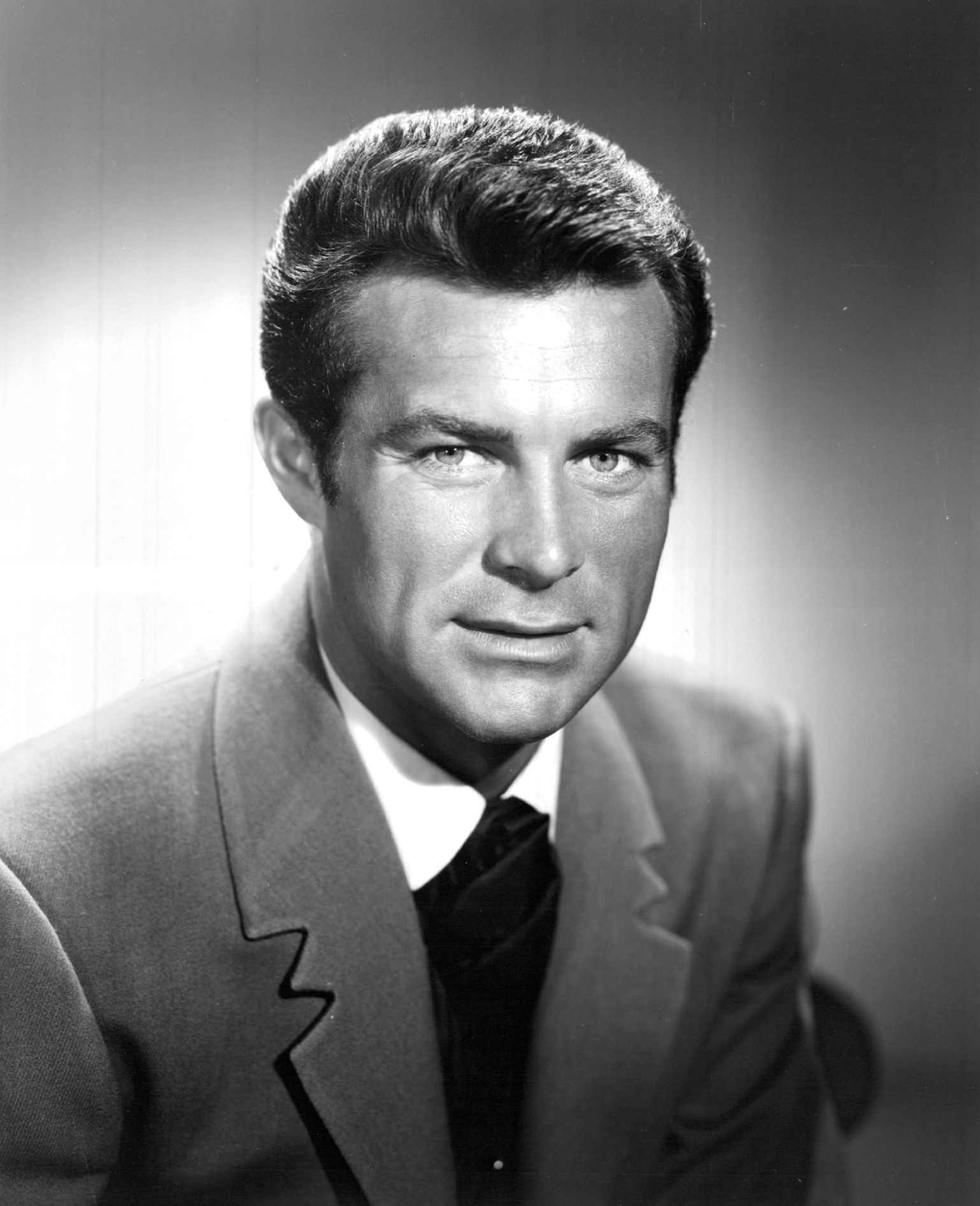
Robert Conrad, who played Jim West in the television series, arrived at the 20th Golden Raspberry Awards ceremony to collect the Razzies the film won to express his objections to the film.

On the review aggregator website Rotten Tomatoes, 16% of 131 critics' reviews are positive, with an average rating of 4.1/10. The website's consensus reads: "Bombastic, manic, and largely laugh-free, Wild Wild West is a bizarre misfire in which greater care was lavished upon the special effects than on the script." Metacritic, which uses a weighted average, assigned the film a score of 40 out of 100, based on 25 critics, indicating "mixed or average" reviews. Audiences polled by CinemaScore gave the film an average grade of "C+" on an A+ to F scale.

Roger Ebert of The Chicago Sun-Times gave the film one star out of four, writing that "Wild Wild West is a comedy dead zone. You stare in disbelief as scenes flop and die. The movie is all concept and no content; the elaborate special effects are like watching money burn on the screen." Janet Maslin of The New York Times gave the film a negative review, saying that it "leaves reality so far behind that its storytelling would be arbitrary even by comic-book standards, and its characters share no common ground or emotional connection."

Robert Conrad, who played Jim West in the original series, was highly critical of the film. While he had no problem with the film depicting West as an African American rather than a Caucasian, he felt Will Smith was miscast as the character, saying he would have preferred an actor with "a Wesley Snipes body with a Denzel Washington head" for the role. He further stated he would have preferred either Kevin Spacey or Gary Sinise for the role of Artemus Gordon instead of Kevin Kline, and objected to the film's depiction of Dr. Loveless, who was a dwarf in the series, as an amputee.

=== Accolades ===
List of awards and nominations
Award	Date of ceremony	Category	Recipients	Result
Golden Raspberry Awards	March 25, 2000	Worst Actor	Kevin Kline	Nominated
Golden Raspberry Awards	March 25, 2000	Worst Supporting Actor	Kenneth Branagh	Nominated
Golden Raspberry Awards	March 25, 2000	Worst Supporting Actress	Salma Hayek	Nominated
Golden Raspberry Awards	March 25, 2000	Worst Supporting Actress	Kevin Kline (as a prostitute)	Nominated
Golden Raspberry Awards	March 25, 2000	Worst Screen Couple	Will Smith and Kevin Kline	Won
Golden Raspberry Awards	March 25, 2000	Worst Original Song	"Wild Wild West"	Won
Golden Raspberry Awards	March 25, 2000	Worst Screenplay	S. S. Wilson	Won
Golden Raspberry Awards	March 25, 2000	Worst Screenplay	Brent Maddock	Won
Golden Raspberry Awards	March 25, 2000	Worst Screenplay	Jeffrey Price; Peter S. Seaman	Won
Golden Raspberry Awards	March 25, 2000	Worst Director	Barry Sonnenfeld	Won
Golden Raspberry Awards	March 25, 2000	Worst Picture	Barry Sonnenfeld	Won
Golden Raspberry Awards	March 25, 2000	Worst Picture	Jon Peters	Won
Stinkers Bad Movie Awards	2000	Worst Picture	Warner Bros.	Won
Stinkers Bad Movie Awards	2000	Worst Screenplay for a Film Grossing More Than $100 Million Worldwide (Using Hollywood Math)	Warner Bros.	Won
Stinkers Bad Movie Awards	2000	Most Painfully Unfunny Comedy	Warner Bros.	Won
Stinkers Bad Movie Awards	2000	Worst Resurrection of a TV Show	Warner Bros.	Won
Stinkers Bad Movie Awards	2000	Least "Special" Special Effects	Warner Bros.	Nominated
Stinkers Bad Movie Awards	2000	Biggest Disappointment	Warner Bros.	Nominated
Stinkers Bad Movie Awards	2000	Worst Sense of Direction	Barry Sonnenfeld	Nominated
Stinkers Bad Movie Awards	2000	Worst Actor	Kevin Kline	Nominated
Stinkers Bad Movie Awards	2000	Worst On-Screen Couple	Will Smith and Kevin Kline	Nominated
Stinkers Bad Movie Awards	2000	Worst Song	"Wild Wild West"	Nominated
ASCAP Awards	2000	Most Performed Songs from Motion Pictures	"Wild Wild West"	Won
ASCAP Awards	2000	Top Box Office Films	Elmer Bernstein	Won
Blockbuster Entertainment Awards	May 9, 2000	Favorite Supporting Actress – Action	Salma Hayek	Won
Blockbuster Entertainment Awards	May 9, 2000	Favorite Villain	Kenneth Branagh	Nominated
Blockbuster Entertainment Awards	May 9, 2000	Favorite Action Team	Will Smith and Kevin Kline	Nominated
Blockbuster Entertainment Awards	May 9, 2000	Favorite Song from a Movie	"Wild Wild West"	Nominated
ALMA Awards	April 15, 2000	Outstanding Actress in a Feature Film	Salma Hayek	Nominated

Wild Wild West later ranked in the listed bottom 20 of the Stinkers' "100 Years, 100 Stinkers" list (which noted the 100 worst films of the 20th century) at #2, but lost to Battlefield Earth.

== Soundtrack ==
A soundtrack containing hip-hop and R&B music was released on June 15, 1999 by Interscope Records and Overbrook Music. It peaked at number four on both the Billboard 200 and the Top R&B/Hip-Hop Albums.

== Video game ==
An action-adventure video game titled Wild Wild West: The Steel Assassin was developed and released by SouthPeak Interactive on December 7, 1999, almost six months following the film's release.

== Lawsuit ==
In 1997, writer Gilbert Ralston sued Warner Bros. over the upcoming feature film based on the series. Ralston helped create the original television series The Wild Wild West and scripted the pilot episode "The Night of the Inferno". In a deposition, Ralston explained that in 1964, he had been approached by producer Michael Garrison, who "said he had an idea for a series, good commercial idea, and wanted to know if I could glue the idea of a Western hero and a James Bond type together in the same show". Ralston said he then created the Civil War characters, the format, the story outline and nine drafts of the script that were the basis for the television series. It was his idea, for example, to have a secret agent named Jim West who would perform secret missions for a bumbling President Grant.

Ralston's experience brought to light a common Hollywood practice of the 1950s and 1960s when television writers who helped create popular series allowed producers or studios to take credit for a show, thus cheating the writers out of millions of dollars in royalties. However, Ralston died in 1999 before his suit was settled, resulting in Warner Bros. paying his family between $600,000 and $1.5 million.

== See also ==
- List of Western films of the 1990s
- List of steampunk works

Awards
Preceded by An Alan Smithee Film: Burn Hollywood Burn	Razzie Award for Worst Picture; 20th Golden Raspberry Awards	Succeeded by Battlefield Earth
