= The Crowded Sky =

1960 film

- Theatrical release poster
- Directed by: Joseph Pevney
- Screenplay by: Charles Schnee
- Based on: The Crowded Sky; 1960 novel by Hank Searls
- Produced by: Michael Garrison
- Starring: Dana Andrews; Rhonda Fleming; Efrem Zimbalist Jr.
- Cinematography: Harry Stradling Sr.
- Edited by: Tom McAdoo
- Music by: Leonard Rosenman
- Production company: Warner Bros. Pictures
- Distributed by: Warner Bros. Pictures
- Release date: September 2, 1960
- Running time: 105 minutes
- Country: United States
- Language: English

The Crowded Sky is a 1960 American Technicolor drama film distributed by Warner Bros. Pictures, produced by Michael Garrison, directed by Joseph Pevney and starring Dana Andrews, Rhonda Fleming and Efrem Zimbalist Jr. The film is based on the 1960 novel of the same name by Hank Searls.

The story follows the crew and passengers of a U.S. Navy jet and a commercial airliner carrying a full load of passengers during a bout of severe weather. Other issues, such as a malfunctioning radio, render communication with air-traffic control nearly impossible and the two aircraft are on a collision course.

== Plot ==
A U.S. Navy Lockheed TV-2 jet piloted by Commander Dale Heath, with an enlisted man, McVey, as a rear passenger, runs into trouble soon after takeoff. Heath's radio and navigation system become disabled, leaving him unable to correctly determine the jet's altitude. At the same time, a Douglas DC-7 airliner piloted by veteran Dick Barnett is carrying a full passenger complement, each with his or her own worries and problems.

Barnett and Heath have their own personal crises: Heath is stuck in an unhappy marriage to a tramp, and Barnett had had a long-time conflict with Mike Rule, his copilot. Rule has his own personal demons, including his empty relationship with his catatonic father and an affair with head stewardess Kitty Foster.

Although both pilots make various errors, Barnett willfully ignores air-traffic control, changing his plane's assigned altitude in order to give his passengers a more comfortable ride---and inadvertently placing the two aircraft on a direct collision course that air-traffic controllers are then unable to prevent. When the crash inevitably occurs, Heath sacrifices himself and his passenger by diving his plane at the last minute to avoid fatally damaging the airliner, making amends for a past tragedy that he had caused by climbing at the last minute instead. The airliner is still badly damaged, and flight engineer Louis Capelli is blown out of a hole, falling to his death. The passengers and crew fight for their lives. Even with one engine destroyed and a wing on fire, Barnett brings the airliner down safely. He later accepts responsibility for the collision during the accident investigation. In the aftermath of the crash, Mike and Kitty are not only survivors but are now planning a future life together.

== Cast ==
- Dana Andrews as Dick Barnett
- Rhonda Fleming as Cheryl Heath
- Efrem Zimbalist Jr. as Dale Heath
- John Kerr as Mike Rule
- Anne Francis as Kitty Foster
- Keenan Wynn as Nick Hyland
- Troy Donahue as McVey
- Joe Mantell as Louis Capelli
- Patsy Kelly as Gertrude Ross
- Donald May as Norm Coster
- Louis Quinn as Sidney Schreiber
- Ed Kemmer as Caesar (as Edward Kemmer)
- Tom Gilson as Rob Fermi
- Hollis Irving as Beatrice Wiley
- Paul Genge as Samuel N. Poole
- Nan Leslie as Bev
- Jean Willes as Gloria Panawek

== Production ==
Miniatures were used extensively to depict the aircraft in flight, including the climactic crash scene.

Film rights to the novel The Crowded Sky, written by a former U.S. Navy flyer, were sold before the book was published. The screenplay employs the frequent device of characters thinking aloud, as screenwriter Charles Schnee felt that audiences required more subtlety in characterization, which could be achieved with the additional dialogue.

The Crowded Sky was the first film role in more than a year for Dana Andrews, who had been appearing on Broadway in the play Two for the Seesaw. Andrews described the film "as a kind of Bridge of San Luis Rey of the air."

In order to prepare for his role, Zimbalist trained for 20 hours in a jet flight simulator to familiarize himself with the controls that his character would use. Troy Donahue's role was a departure from the usual teenage films that he had made for Warner Bros. Pictures. The main theme music from A Summer Place, Donahue's preceding film, appears in the soundtrack. Principal photography began in mid-October and concluded in mid-November 1959.

Even though the Dick Barnett character mentions that he knows how to fly DC-7s, the actual plane used in the film appears to be a Douglas DC-6. The DC-7 has four-blade propellers but the DC-6's propellers have only three blades.

== Reception ==
The Crowded Sky was received with mixed reviews by audiences and critics alike. The Los Angeles Times called it "interesting but uneven."Variety published a mixed review, criticizing Pevney's directing but praising the aerial scenes.

In a more critical review in The New York Times, Eugene Archer called The Crowded Sky "reprehensible" because it exploited human tragedy. His review noted: "Possibly a meaningful film could be developed from this theme, but as directed with an emphasis on sensationalism by Joseph Pevney, the effect is as meretricious as it is harrowing."

Modern reviews have been more favorable. Glenn Erickson of DVD Talk wrote a mostly positive review but commented that The Crowded Sky feels more like an "unintentional comedy" than a serious dramatic film. Reviewer Leonard Maltin called it a "slick film focusing on emotional problems aboard jet liner and Navy plane bound for fateful collision; superficial but diverting."

== See also ==
- List of American films of 1960
- 1957 Pacoima mid-air collision, a 1957 collision of a military jet and civil airliner
- United Airlines Flight 736, a 1958 collision of a military jet and civil airliner
- Hughes Airwest Flight 706, a 1971 collision of a military jet and civil airliner
