= The Phantom of Hollywood =

1974 television film by Gene Levitt

- DVD cover
- Genre: Drama; Horror; Thriller
- Teleplay by: George Schenck
- Story by: Robert Thom; George Schenck
- Directed by: Gene Levitt
- Starring: Skye Aubrey; Jack Cassidy; Jackie Coogan; Broderick Crawford; Peter Haskell; John Ireland; Peter Lawford
- Music by: Leonard Rosenman
- Country of origin: United States
- Original language: English

Production
- Executive producer: Burt Nodella
- Producer: Gene Levitt
- Production locations: Lot 2, Metro-Goldwyn-Mayer Studios, Culver City, California; Metro-Goldwyn-Mayer Studios - 10202 W. Washington Blvd., Culver City, California
- Cinematography: Gene Polito
- Editor: Henry Batista
- Running time: 74 minutes
- Production company: MGM Television

Original release
- Network: CBS
- Release: February 12, 1974

The Phantom of Hollywood is a 1974 American made-for-television horror thriller film and starring Skye Aubrey, Jack Cassidy, Jackie Coogan, Broderick Crawford, Peter Haskell John Ireland and Peter Lawford. It is notable for being one of the last films shot on the Metro-Goldwyn-Mayer back lot, which was being demolished at the time of filming.

The film aired on CBS Television, and was originally titled The Phantom of Lot 2. A riff on Gaston Leroux's 1910 novel The Phantom of the Opera, it was produced and directed by Gene Levitt.

== Plot ==
Murders taking place on the back lot of Worldwide Studios turn out to be the work of a disfigured actor who has been living there for years and will stop at nothing to cease the sale of the back lot to developers.

== Cast ==
- Skye Aubrey as Randy Cross
- Jack Cassidy as Otto Vonner / Karl Vonner
- Jackie Coogan as Jonathan
- Broderick Crawford as Capt. O'Neal
- Peter Haskell as Ray Burns
- John Ireland as Lt. Gifford
- Peter Lawford as Roger Cross
- Gary Barton as Duke
- Corinne Calvet as Mrs. Wickes
- John Lupton as Al
- Kent Taylor as Wickes
- Regis Toomey as Joe
- Fredd Wayne as Clyde
- Bill Williams - Fogel
- Carl Byrd as Cameraman
- Edward Cross as Clint
- Damon Douglas as Andy
- Bill Stout as Commentator
- Billy Halop as Studio Engineer
- Elisha Cook Jr. as Studio Engineer

== Production ==
The film was produced by Metro-Goldwyn-Mayer with Gene Levitt as its director, William McGarry as assistant director, and Burt Nodella as the executive producer.

Skye Aubrey (1945-2020) was married to Ilya Salkind from 1976-79. Her mother was Phyllis Thaxter and her father was James T. Aubrey Jr.

== Reception ==
Lou Cedrone of The Baltimore Sun found the villain's disguise unconvincing, and felt that the archive footage of MGM films featured was more interesting than the film itself.

== See also ==
- List of American films of 1974
