= Any Second Now =

- Based on: story by Levitt, Bob Mitchell, Harold Jack Bloom
- Screenplay by: Gene Levitt
- Directed by: Gene Levitt
- Starring: Stewart Granger
- Country of origin: United States
- Original language: English

Production
- Executive producer: Roy Huggins
- Producer: Gene Levitt
- Production company: Universal

Original release
- Release: 1969

Any Second Now is a 1969 TV film directed by Gene Levitt and starring Stewart Granger and Lois Nettleton. The film score was composed by Leonard Rosenman.

== Plot ==
A philandering photographer plans to kill his wife. He fails and the wife gets amnesia.

== Cast ==
- Stewart Granger as Paul Dennison
- Lois Nettleton as Nancy Dennison
- Joseph Campanella as Dr. Raul Valdez
- Dana Wynter as Jane Peterson
- Katy Jurado as Senora Vorhis
- Tom Tully as Howard Lenihan
- Marion Ross as Mrs. Hoyt
- Eileen Wesson as American Girl
- Bob Hastings as Gary
- Francine York as Samantha
- Bill McCright as American Tourist
- Victor Millan as Luis de Cordova
- John Alladin as Dallas Mitchell

== Production ==
Any Second Now was Granger's first Hollywood film in six years. Filming began 11 February 1969.

== Reception ==
The Los Angeles Times called Any Second Now "suspenseful and sudsy enough to hold the viewer's attention."
