= Young Joe, the Forgotten Kennedy =

1977 television film directed by Richard T. Heffron

- Genre: Biography; Drama
- Based on: ''The Lost Prince: Young Joe, the Forgotten Kennedy by Hank Searls
- Written by: M. Charles Cohen
- Directed by: Richard T. Heffron
- Starring: Peter Strauss; Barbara Parkins; Stephen Elliott; Darleen Carr
- Theme music composer: John Barry
- Country of origin: United States
- Original language: English

Production
- Producer: Bill McCutchen
- Cinematography: Stevan Larner
- Editor: Ronald J. Fagin
- Running time: 100 minutes
- Production company: ABC Circle Films

Original release
- Network: ABC
- Release: September 18, 1977

Young Joe, the Forgotten Kennedy is a 1977 American made-for-television biographical film that originally aired on ABC. Based upon the biography by Hank Searls called The Lost Prince: Young Joe, the Forgotten Kennedy, the film chronicles the life of Joseph P. Kennedy Jr., the older brother of John F. Kennedy who was killed in action in World War II, leaving behind aspirations to become the first Irish-Catholic president. Young Joe stars Peter Strauss in the title role and was directed by Richard T. Heffron.

== Cast ==
- Peter Strauss ... Joe Kennedy Jr.
- Barbara Parkins ... Vanessa Hunt
- Stephen Elliott ... Joe Kennedy
- Darleen Carr ... Kathleen "Kick" Kennedy
- Simon Oakland ... Delaney
- Asher Brauner ... Mike Krasna
- Lance Kerwin ... Joe Jr. (age 14)
- Peter Fox ... Simpson
- Steve Kanaly ... Ray Pierce
- Robert Englund ... Willy
- Gloria Stroock ... Rose Kennedy
- Tara Talboy ... Elinor
- Ben Fuhrman ... Hank Riggs
- James Sikking ... Commander Devril
- Ken Swofford ... Greenway
- Sam Chew Jr. ... Jack Kennedy
- Patrick Labyorteaux ... Teddy Kennedy
- Shane Kerwin ... Bobby Kennedy
- Margie Zech ... Jean Kennedy
- Kirsten Larkin ... Rosemary Kennedy
- Rosanne Covy ... Eunice Kennedy
- Deirdre Berthrong ... Pat Kennedy
- Lawrence Driscoll ... Anderson
- Michael Irving ... Billy Harrington
- Gardner Hayes ... English Major

== Production ==
The production was filmed in Seattle. Strauss, then highly popular due to his starring appearances in the television miniseries Rich Man, Poor Man, said he had turned down a million-dollar offer to continue with a third year of that miniseries before taking on the role of Joe Kennedy, and that he had researched it heavily. The production received attention when it was discovered that Bill Foulon, an escaped convict from the Oregon State Penitentiary, had managed to secure work as an extra on the film, and later (while still on the run) called the Los Angeles Times to talk about his experience.

== Reception ==
Reviews of the film were mixed. Pittsburgh Post-Gazette columnist Win Fanning gave it a strongly positive review, saying that Strauss had "acquitted himself brilliantly" in portraying Kennedy as a "driven young man". Kay Gardella of the New York Daily News gave it a moderately positive review, though she commented that Strauss, as Kennedy, had done a better job of "imitating Jack Kennedy" than Sam Chew, the actor who had actually played the future president. On the other hand, Chris Stoehr of The Milwaukee Sentinel thought that Strauss had been "trapped" in a bad production with "unforgivably bad lines" and a failure to show the viewer Joe Kennedy's special qualities.

Author Lawrence J. Quirk later summarized the film's reception as "respectful but yawning", and noted that it had been a disappointment for Strauss and several other actors who had seen it as a career opportunity when they joined the production.

== Awards ==
Young Joe received three nominations at the 1978 Primetime Emmy Awards, including one for Outstanding Special - Drama or Comedy, and won one, for sound mixing.

== See also ==
- List of television films produced for American Broadcasting Company
- Cultural depictions of John F. Kennedy
