= Gene Levitt =

American television writer, producer and director

- Born: Eugene Levitt; May 28, 1920; Brooklyn, New York, United States
- Died: November 15, 1999 (aged 79); Los Angeles, California, United States
- Occupations: Writer, producer, director

Eugene Levitt (May 28, 1920 – November 15, 1999) was an American television writer, producer and director.

== Life and career ==
Levitt was born in Brooklyn, New York, the son of Charles and Teresa Levitt. He had an older sister, Betty Ruth. His mother died when Gene was about 12 years old. Levitt attended the University of Wyoming. Following graduation he moved to Chicago where he worked as a newspaper reporter until enlisting in the United States Marine Corps.

In the 1940s, Levitt wrote for radio programs, including The Adventures of Philip Marlowe.

Levitt was a writer for many television series in the 1950s and 1960s, including Highway Patrol, Maverick ("Trail West to Fury"), Adventures in Paradise and Combat!. He moved to directing in the 1970s, working on series such as Alias Smith and Jones and McCloud. His most significant achievement was the creation of the television series Fantasy Island, starring Ricardo Montalbán and Herve Villechaize. The show ran for over six years.

In addition to Fantasy Island, Levitt assisted in the writing, production, and directing of Hawaii-Five-O, and Alias Smith and Jones.

He died of prostate cancer in Los Angeles, California.

== Filmography ==
=== Films ===
Year	Film	Credit	Notes
1956	Foreign Intrigue	Story By	
1956	Beyond Mombasa	Written By	Co-Wrote screenplay with "Richard English"
1957	The Night Runner	Screenplay By	
1958	Underwater Warrior	Screenplay By	
1964	The Yellowbird	Screenplay By, Produced By	
1968	Daring Game	Produced By	
1969	Any Second Now	Directed By, Produced By, Written By	
1969	Run a Crooked Mile	Director	
1969	Anatomy of a Crime	Produced By	
1970	The Forty-Eight Hour Mile	Directed By	
1974	The Phantom of Hollywood	Directed By, Produced By	
1978	Magee and The Lady	Directed By	
1978	Barnaby and Me	Produced By	

=== Television ===
Year	TV Series	Credit	Notes
1951–52	Front Page Detective	Writer	6 Episodes
1953-54	I Led 3 Lives	Writer	7 Episodes
1953-54	Your Favorite Story	Writer	6 Episodes
1953–56	The Loretta Young Show	Writer	13 Episodes
1954	Mr. District Attorney	Writer	1 Episode
1954–55	Foreign Intrigue	Writer	9 Episodes
1955	Captain Gallant of the Foreign Legion	Writer	5 Episodes
1955	Highway Patrol	Writer	2 Episodes
1955	Science Fiction Theatre	Writer	1 Episode
1955–56	The Ford Television Theater	Writer	2 Episodes
1956	Celebrity Playhouse	Writer	1 Episode
1956	Climax!	Writer	1 Episode
1956	Schlitz Playhouse of Stars	Writer	2 Episodes
1956	The Man Called X	Writer	1 Episode
1956	TV Reader's Digest	Writer	1 Episode
1957	The Californians	Writer	3 Episodes
1957-58	Men of Annapolis	Writer	5 Episodes
1957-58	Tombstone Territory	Writer	3 Episodes
1957-59	Maverick	Writer	5 Episodes
1957-59	Richard Diamond, Private Detective	Writer	3 Episodes
1958	Colt .45	Writer	1 Episode
1958	Sea Hunt	Writer	2 Episodes
1958-60	Bat Masterson	Writer	8 Episodes
1958-60	77 Sunset Strip	Writer	2 Episodes
1959	The Man and The Challenge	Writer	3 Episodes
1959	The David Niven Show	Writer	1 Episode
1959	This Man Dawson	Writer	
1959–62	Adventures In Paradise	Writer, Producer	Multiple Episodes
1960	The Four Just Men	Writer	1 Episode
1961	The Aquanauts	Writer	1 Episode
1962–66	Combat!	Writer, Producer	88 Episodes
1968–69	The Outsider	Writer, Director	Multiple Episodes
1970	The Name Of The Game	Director	2 Episodes
1970	The Bold Ones: The Lawyers	Director	1 Episode
1971	Alias Smith and Jones	Director	2 Episodes
1971	Night Gallery	Director	1 Episode
1972	Cool Million	Writer, Director, Producer	2 Episodes
1973	Barnaby Jones	Producer	12 Episodes
1974	McCloud	Director	1 Episode
1975	Get Christie Love!	Writer	1 Episode
1975	Kolchak: The Night Stalker	Director	1 Episode
1975	S.W.A.T.	Director, Producer	Multiple Episodes
1977–84	Fantasy Island	Writer, Creator	Multiple Episodes
1978–79	Project U.F.O.	Supervising Producer	8 Episodes
1979–80	Hawaii Five-O	Producer, Supervising Producer	16 Episodes
1981	The Misadventures of Sheriff Lobo	Director	1 Episode
1983	Trauma Center	Director	1 Episode
