= Leonard Rosenman =

American composer (1924 – 2008)

Background information
- Born: Leonard Rosenman; September 7, 1924; Brooklyn, New York, U.S.
- Died: March 4, 2008 (aged 83) Woodland Hills, Los Angeles, California, U.S.
- Occupations: Composer, conductor
- Instrument: Orchestra
- Years active: 1955–2001

Leonard Rosenman (September 7, 1924 – March 4, 2008) was an American film, television and concert composer with credits in over 130 works, including East of Eden, Rebel Without a Cause, Star Trek IV: The Voyage Home, Beneath the Planet of the Apes, Battle for the Planet of the Apes, Barry Lyndon, Race with the Devil, and the animated The Lord of the Rings.

== Life and career ==
Rosenman was born in Brooklyn, New York, United States. His parents, Rose (née Kantor) and Julius Rosenman, were Jewish immigrants from Poland. He had a younger brother named Paul. After service in the Pacific with the United States Army Air Forces in World War II, Rosenman earned a bachelor's degree in music from the University of California, Berkeley. He also studied composition with Arnold Schoenberg, Roger Sessions and Luigi Dallapiccola.

Amongst Rosenman's earliest film work were the scores for James Dean movies East of Eden (1955) and Rebel Without a Cause (1955). The composer had met Dean at a party for the cast of a Broadway play, and two weeks later Dean had appeared at his doorstep wanting to take piano lessons; consequently, the actor had begun to frequent Rosenman's apartment, and it was Dean who introduced him to director Elia Kazan. Dean also lobbied George Stevens to let Rosenman score Giant, but Stevens preferred Dimitri Tiomkin.

Rosenman remarked, "The year I did my first film, I had five major performances in New York." But "the minute I did my first film, I didn't have a performance there for 20 years. They would never say, 'I don't like them'. They wouldn't look at them."

He composed the score for Vincente Minnelli's The Cobweb (1955), regarded as the first major Hollywood score to be written in the Twelve-tone technique. His avant-garde music was used for Martin Ritt's Edge of the City (1956) and John Frankenheimer's The Young Stranger (1957). He composed scores for war films such as William Wellman's biographical Lafayette Escadrille (1958), Lewis Milestone's Pork Chop Hill (1959), Delbert Mann's The Outsider (1961), Don Siegel's Hell is for Heroes (1962), and the Combat! television series (1962). He wrote incidental music for such television series as Law of the Plainsman, The Defenders, The Twilight Zone, Gibbsville, and Marcus Welby, M.D..

He went on to compose George Cukor's The Chapman Report, then Richard Fleischer's Fantastic Voyage (1966), where he rejected producer Saul David's instructions. Rosenman stated, "A producer asked me to write a jazz score, and I asked him why. He said he wanted the picture to be the first hip science fiction movie. I said that's a great idea for an advertising agency, but it doesn't fit the film." Rosenman instead wrote a largely atonal score, with a recurring motif as the main "theme," building to a tonal conclusion.

He provided scores to science fiction movies like Beneath the Planet of the Apes (1970), Battle for the Planet of the Apes, the horror movie Race with the Devil, the first animated adaptation of The Lord of the Rings (1978), and Star Trek IV: The Voyage Home (1986).

In the 1970s, he composed Bass Concerto Chamber Music 4 for bassist Buell Neidlinger and four string quartets with a second bass.

In 1983, he composed the score for Cross Creek, for which he received an Academy Award nomination.

In 1995, Nonesuch Records issued an album of music from both East of Eden and Rebel Without A Cause, played by the London Sinfonietta conducted by John Adams.

In his seventies, Rosenman was diagnosed with Frontotemporal dementia, a degenerative brain condition with symptoms similar to Alzheimer's disease.

He died March 4, 2008, of a heart attack at the Motion Picture & Television Country House and Hospital in Woodland Hills, Los Angeles, California.

== Awards ==
Leonard Rosenman earned two Academy Awards:

- Barry Lyndon (1975), for Best Music, Scoring Original Song Score and/or Adaptation (music by Handel, Schubert and others)
- Bound for Glory (1976), for Best Music, Original Song Score and Its Adaptation or Best Adaptation Score (the songs of Woody Guthrie)

After receiving his second Oscar he quipped, "I write original music too, you know!"

He received two additional Academy Award nominations:

- Cross Creek (1983), for Best Music, Original Score
- Star Trek IV: The Voyage Home (1986), for Best Music, Original Score

He also received two Emmy Awards:

- Sybil (1976), for Outstanding Achievement in Music Composition for a Special (Dramatic Underscore), with Alan and Marilyn Bergman
- Friendly Fire (1979), for Outstanding Music Composition for a Limited Series or a Special

== Filmography ==
- East of Eden (1955)
- Rebel Without a Cause (1955)
- The Cobweb (1955)
- Edge of the City (1957)
- The Young Stranger (1957)
- Bombers B-52 (1957)
- Lafayette Escadrille (1958)
- Pork Chop Hill (1959)
- The Rise and Fall of Legs Diamond (1960)
- The Bramble Bush (1960)
- The Savage Eye (1960)
- The Crowded Sky (1960)
- The Plunderers (1960)
- The Outsider (1961)
- The Chapman Report (1962)
- Hell Is for Heroes (1962)
- Convicts 4 (1962)
- Fantastic Voyage (1966)
- Stranger on the Run (1967)
- A Covenant with Death (1967)
- Countdown (1968)
- Hellfighters (1968)
- Any Second Now (1969)
- The Todd Killings (1970)
- Beneath the Planet of the Apes (1970)
- A Man Called Horse (1970)
- Banyon (1971)
- Battle for the Planet of the Apes (1973)
- The Cat Creature (1973)
- The Phantom of Hollywood (1974)
- Judge Dee and the Monastery Murders (1974)
- Race with the Devil (1975)
- Barry Lyndon (1975; Academy Award)
- Sybil (1976; Emmy Award)
- Bound for Glory (1976; Academy Award)
- The Possessed (1977)
- The Car (1977)
- Nero Wolfe (1977)
- September 30, 1955 (1977)
- The Lord of the Rings (1978)
- An Enemy of the People (1978)
- Prophecy (1979)
- Promises in the Dark (1979)
- Friendly Fire (1979; Emmy Award)
- The Jazz Singer (1980)
- Hide in Plain Sight (1980)
- Joshua's World (1980)
- City in Fear (1980)
- Murder in Texas (1981)
- Making Love (1982)
- Miss Lonelyhearts (1983)
- Cross Creek (1983)
- Heartsounds (1984)
- Heart of the Stag (1984)
- Sylvia (1985)
- First Steps (1985)
- Star Trek IV: The Voyage Home (1986)
- Promised a Miracle (1988)
- Body Wars (1989)
- RoboCop 2 (1990)
- The Color of Evening (1990)
- Ambition (1991)
- Aftermath: A Test of Love (1991)
- Keeper of the City (1991)
- The Face on the Milk Carton (1994)
- Mrs. Munck (1995)
- Levitation (1997)
- Jurij (2001)
