= Hank Searls =

American author and screenwriter (1922–2017)

- Born: Henry Hunt Searls; August 10, 1922; San Francisco, California, U.S.
- Died: February 17, 2017 (aged 94); Gig Harbor, Washington, U.S.
- Education: United States Naval Academy
- Occupations: Novelist and screenwriter

Henry Hunt Searls (August 10, 1922 – February 17, 2017) was an American author and screenwriter. His novels included The Crowded Sky (1960), which was adapted as the 1960 movie of the same name; The Pilgrim Project (1964), which was adapted as the 1968 movie Countdown; and The Penetrators (1965, writing as Anthony Gray). Searls also wrote the novelizations for the movies Jaws 2 (1978) featuring Roy Scheider and Murray Hamilton, and Jaws: The Revenge (1987) featuring Michael Caine and Lorraine Gary.

== Career ==
Hank Searls' 1960 novel, The Crowded Sky, was made that same year into a feature movie featuring Dana Andrews, Rhonda Fleming, Anne Francis, and Troy Donahue.

Set in the USAF's Strategic Air Command, the 1965 novel The Penetrators is the story of a maverick Royal Air Force exchange officer who commands a mock Avro Vulcan bomber attack on the USA. Replete with quotes from Curtis LeMay, Robert S McNamara and other officials of the Cold War era, The Penetrators was the kind of detailed, political-military thriller which later became characteristic of Tom Clancy. The book also strongly argued the case for the US's crewed long-range bomber force, which was then in danger of being phased out in favour of ICBMs.

Searls' novel The Pilgrim Project was adapted as the 1968 Robert Altman movie Countdown, which featured Robert Duvall and James Caan.

Based on his own novel of the same title, Searls wrote the screenplay for the 1978 Angie Dickinson television movie Overboard. He wrote a biography of Joseph P. Kennedy Jr. The Lost Prince: Young Joe, The Forgotten Kennedy. This became the basis of the 1977 television film Young Joe, the Forgotten Kennedy, with Peter Strauss in the title role.

Searls' other military and aviation-themed novels included: The Astronaut (1962), Pentagon (1971), Hero Ship (1969), The Big X (1959), and Altitude Zero (1991). His other writings were Firewind (1981), Sounding (1982), Blood Song (1984), Kataki (1987), and The Adventures of Mike Blair (1988). He also wrote the novelizations of the movies Jaws 2 in 1978 and Jaws: The Revenge in 1987.

In the book Console Wars (2014) by Blake Harris, the popular Sega Genesis game Ecco the Dolphin (1992) is said to be inspired by Searls' novel "Sounding", though the reference is anonymized. Ed Annunziata, designer of Ecco and its sequel, allegedly thought of the concept for the game while reading the novel.

== Bibliography ==
=== Novels ===
- Never Kill A Cop (1959) (as Lee Costigan)
- The Big X (1959)
- The Crowded Sky (1960)
- The Astronaut (1962)
- The New Breed (1962) (as Lee Costigan)
- The Hard Sell (1964) (as Lee Costigan)
- The Penetrators (1965) (as Anthony Gray)
- The Pilgrim Project (1965), adapted as Countdown (1968)
- The Deceivers (1967) (as Lee Costigan)
- Hero Ship (1969)
- Pentagon (1971)
- Overboard (1978) (and teleplay)
- Jaws 2 (1978) (novelization)
- Firewind (1981)
- Sounding (1982)
- Blood Song (1984)
- Kataki (1987)
- Jaws: The Revenge (1987) (novelization)
- The Adventures of Mike Blair (1988) (short stories)
- Altitude Zero (1991)

=== Collections ===
- The Complete Cases of Mike Blair (2020) (short stories)

=== Uncollected short fiction ===
- Drop Dead Twice (1950)
- Martyr's Flight (1955)
- Late Again (1988)

=== Non Fiction ===
- The Lost Prince: Young Joe, the Forgotten Kennedy (1969) (biography), adapted for TV as Young Joe, the Forgotten Kennedy (1977)

=== Screenplays and Teleplays ===
- The New Breed "No Fat Cops" (1961) (TV episode)
- The Fugitive "Never Wave Goodbye: Part 1 & 2" (1963) (TV episode)
- Convoy "The Man with the Saltwater Socks" (1965) (TV episode)
- Kraft Suspense Theatre "Streetcar, Do You Read Me?" (1965) (TV episode teleplay)
- Felony Squad "A Date with Terror" (1966) (TV episode)
- O'Hara, U.S. Treasury "Operation: Offset" (1971) (TV episode)
- Wheels (1978) TV mini-series writer
