= Bunny Campione =

English antiques expert

- Born: Carolyn Elizabeth Fisher; August 1946 (age 79); England
- Occupations: Antiques expert, television personality
- Employers: Sotheby's (23 years tenure, Furniture Department, Collectors Department 1973–1996); Christies London Office (senior consultant 1997–2002)
- Known for: Appearances on Antiques Roadshow (1985–present)
- Spouse: Iain Grahame (m. 2002; died 2023)
- Family: Stewart Granger (uncle)

Bunny Campione (born Carolyn Elizabeth Fisher; c. August 1946) is an English antiques expert known for her many appearances on the television programme Antiques Roadshow since 1985. She has published her own works on antiques.

== Biography ==
Campione is the daughter of Squadron leader Francis Colborne Fisher, of Mudeford, Dorset, and Iris (née Stewart), sister of British actor Stewart Granger. Campione became known as "Bunny" as a young child, after she was given a coat that had a hood with rabbit ears on it. She studied at university in France and worked at the Bear Lane Gallery in Oxford for a year. She then worked at Sotheby's for 23 years until 1996, gaining a wide knowledge of antiques, firstly in the furniture department and then the collectors' department. She was a senior consultant at Christie's in London until 2002.

Campione lives at Daws Hall, a private nature reserve, in Lamarsh, Essex. Her husband Iain Grahame, Idi Amin's old commander and friend, died on 4 September 2023. She runs her own company, Campione Fine Art, buying and selling antiques on behalf of clients. She has a particular interest in, and knowledge of, automata, bird-cages, corkscrews, dolls, dolls' houses, miniature and early furniture, and soft toys.
