= Countdown (1967 film) =

1967 film by Robert Altman

- Directed by: Robert Altman
- Screenplay by: Loring Mandel
- Based on: The Pilgrim Project by Hank Searls
- Produced by: William Conrad
- Starring: James Caan; Joanna Moore; Robert Duvall; Barbara Baxley; Michael Murphy; Ted Knight
- Cinematography: William W. Spencer
- Edited by: Gene Milford
- Music by: Leonard Rosenman
- Production company: A William Conrad Production
- Distributed by: Warner Bros.-Seven Arts
- Release dates: August 20, 1967 (UK); May 1, 1968 (USA)
- Running time: 101 minutes
- Country: United States
- Language: English

Countdown is a 1967 American science fiction film directed by Robert Altman, based on the 1964 novel The Pilgrim Project by Hank Searls. The film stars James Caan and Robert Duvall as astronauts vying to be the first Americans to walk on the Moon as part of an accelerated program to beat the Soviet Union.

== Plot ==
In the late 1960s, after learning that the Russians will be launching a Moon landing mission in four weeks, NASA decides to activate the "Pilgrim Project". The project is a secret plan to send one astronaut to the Moon in a one-way rocket (depicted in the film as a Titan II), using a modified Project Gemini craft. He would stay on the Moon for a few months in a shelter pod launched and landed before him and wait for astronauts from an Apollo mission to arrive and retrieve him.

The equipment is ready, but the Russians complicate matters by announcing they will be sending up a civilian. NASA and the White House insist that an American civilian be their first man on the Moon. Lee Stegler (James Caan), one of mission commander Chiz's (Robert Duvall) crew, is tapped. Chiz is outraged, but agrees to train Lee in the few days they have. Chiz pushes Lee's training hard, half to get him ready, half hoping he will drop out and Chiz can step in. Lee persists, driven by the same astronaut dream.

After a press leak about Pilgrim, the Russians launch a week early. Deflated at not being first, everyone carries on. The shelter pod is launched and landed successfully. Lee is launched on schedule. He encounters a power drain malfunction en route which tests his character and hinders radio contact. The Russians have also lost contact with their team.

As Lee orbits the Moon, he does not see the beacon of the shelter. With only seconds left before he must abort and return to Earth, he lies about seeing it. Mission Control okays his retro burn and he lands, but radio contact is lost due to a physical obstruction of the signal path.

Lee exits the Gemini lander and walks around with one hour of oxygen in his suit. He finds the crashed Russian lander on its side, the three dead cosmonauts sprawled around the ship. Lee takes the Soviet flag from a dead cosmonaut and lays it on a nearby rock with his own American flag.

With little air left and the shelter not yet located, Lee spins the toy mouse his son gave him. It points right, so he walks in that direction. On Earth, NASA is waiting for an indication that the shelter has been activated, and the press spokesman tries to buoy hopes. As Lee checks his oxygen level from a readout on his arm - less than two minutes left - a red glow on his arm catches his attention: it is the locator beacon atop the shelter. Lee is last seen walking towards the shelter... (presumably) towards survival.

== Cast ==
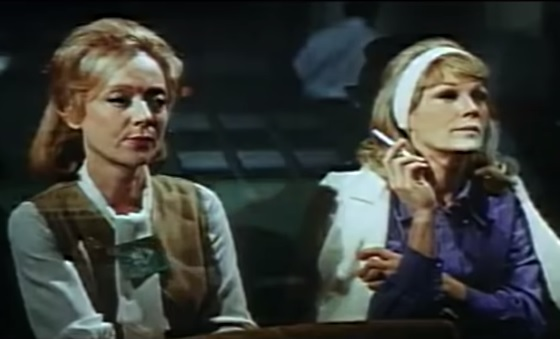
Barbara Baxley and Joanna Moore in Countdown

- James Caan as Lee Stegler
- Joanna Moore as Mickey Stegler
- Robert Duvall as Charles "Chiz" Stewart
- Barbara Baxley as Jean
- Charles Aidman as Gus
- Steve Ihnat as Ross Duellan
- Michael Murphy as Rick
- Ted Knight as Walter Larson
- Stephen Coit as Ehrman
- John Rayner as Dunc
- Charles Irving as Seidel
- Bobby Riha as Stevie Stegler

== Production ==
Under the working title of Moonshot, production on Countdown benefited from the cooperation of NASA, lending facilities at Cocoa Beach, Florida, to enhance the production. Business and recreation scenes were filmed in California at the McDonnell Douglas Astronautics Co. plant in Huntington Beach, Jamaica Bay Inn in Marina del Rey, Warner Brothers Studios in Burbank, and Space Park in Redondo Beach.

== Altman's dismissal ==
Altman was fired as director of the film for delivering footage that featured actors talking over each other; it was so unusual for that time that studio executives considered it incompetence rather than an attempt to make scenes more realistic. He had finished filming and was preparing to begin the editing process when he received a call from Bill Conrad, then executive producer at Warner Brothers:

"He told me, 'Don't come to the studio, they won't let you through the gates' I said, 'What do you mean?' 'Well, Jack Warner saw your dailies and he said, 'That fool has actors talking at the same time.' And I had to drive up to the gate, and there was a cardboard box with all this stuff from my desk, which the guard handed to me. I was not allowed in the studio. And they cut the picture for kids."

As a result of Altman's dismissal, the film's ending was changed. "I left it ambiguous--the guy was probably going to die on the moon...He goes off in one direction, and the camera pans back and reveals the beacon is in the opposite direction. That was how I ended it."

Overlapping dialogue went on to be a signature of Altman's style. In the documentary Altman, the director explains that he was "just trying to get the illusion of reality".

== Reception ==
Critics were harsh with the unrealistic presentation of a rushed moon landing by an inexperienced astronaut. In a May 1968 review of Countdown for The New York Times, critic Howard Thompson calls the film a "limp space-flight drama" which "makes the moon seem just as dull as Mother Earth". A February 1985 review in Malaysia's New Straits Times calls Countdown "dated" and complains that the characters have "no depth or direction". FilmInk called it "an interesting, dated-really-quickly astronaut drama."

In Visions of the future, relics of the past, a June 1995 story in The New York Times, dealing with the history of spaceflight movies, Thomas Mallon appreciates that the film "highlights the space program's early can-do ethos". He also calls Countdown a "little movie" with "few touches of Mr. Altman's later cynical wit" and "somehow not terribly suspenseful".

A comic book adaptation of the film was published by Dell Comics in October 1967.

== See also ==
- List of American films of 1968
- Apollo 13, a 1995 film dramatizing the Apollo 13 incident
- Love, a 2011 film about being stranded in space
- Marooned, a 1969 film adaptation of a Martin Caidin novel of the same name about an Apollo/Skylab-type mission crew stranded in space after a hardware failure which in some ways anticipated the Apollo 13 incident.
- List of films featuring space stations
- Survival film genre
