= Michael Garrison (producer) =

American producer

- Born: December 19, 1922; New Jersey, U.S.
- Died: August 17, 1966 (aged 43); Los Angeles, California, U.S.
- Spouse: Barbara Silverstone (m. 1955, divorced)
- Children: 1

Michael Garrison (December 19, 1922 – August 17, 1966) was an American producer and the creator of the television series The Wild Wild West.

== Biography ==
Born in New Jersey, Garrison began his career as an actor, and appeared in Robert E. Sherwood's play There Shall Be No Night in London in 1943. After the war, he had bit parts in several 20th Century Fox films, including Dragonwyck (1946) and Are You with It? (1948).

In 1954, Garrison and Gregory Ratoff purchased the movie rights to Ian Fleming's first James Bond novel, Casino Royale, for $600. CBS, meanwhile, bought the TV rights, and on October 21, 1954, broadcast an hour-long adaptation on its Climax! series, with Barry Nelson playing American agent Jimmy Bond and Peter Lorre playing the villain, le Chiffre. CBS also approached Fleming about developing Bond as a TV series. In 1955, Ratoff and Garrison bought the rights to the novel in perpetuity for an additional $6,000. They pitched the idea for a motion picture to 20th Century Fox, but were turned down. After Ratoff died in 1960, his widow and Garrison sold the film rights to Charles K. Feldman for $75,000. Feldman eventually produced the spoof Casino Royale in 1967.

Garrison was in the casting department at 20th Century Fox before becoming an associate producer under Jerry Wald. He worked on four Wald pictures, Peyton Place (1957), The Long Hot Summer, The Sound and the Fury, and An Affair to Remember. In the fall of 1958, he moved to Warner Bros. as an assistant to Steve Trilling. Garrison produced The Dark at the Top of the Stairs (1960) and The Crowded Sky. He also produced the short-lived 1961 CBS television series The Investigators.

In the mid-1960s, Garrison pitched The Wild Wild West to CBS as "James Bond on horseback"—linking the television Western to the popular spy genre. During its first season, the series had difficulties and CBS rotated nine producers in and out of the show. The network tried to fire Garrison, but he was reinstated at the end of the season. The series was in production on its second season when, while preparing for a party at his new Bel Air home on August 17, 1966, Garrison slipped in some water on a flight of stairs, falling and fatally fracturing his skull. According to Variety, he had three TV shows in development at the time of his death: The Pickle Brothers, starring Don Rickles; Happy Valley for Warner Bros.; and Kelly's Country.

In 1955, Garrison married Barbara Silverstone, daughter of Murray Silverstone, president of 20th Century-Fox International, and Dorothy Silverstone. They later divorced.

== Death ==
Garrison died of injuries sustained in a fall in 1966.
