= Columbo season 3 =

Season of television series

Columbo
- Season 3
- No. of episodes: 8

Release
- Original network: NBC
- Original release: September 23, 1973 – May 5, 1974

Season chronology
- ← Previous; Season 2 Next → Season 4

This is a list of episodes from the third season of Columbo.

== Broadcast history ==
The season originally aired Sundays at 8:30–10:00 pm (EST) as part of The NBC Sunday Mystery Movie.

== DVD release ==
The season was released on DVD by Universal Pictures Home Entertainment.

== Episodes ==
No. overall	No. in season	Title	Directed by	Written by	Murderer played by	Victim(s) played by	Original release date	Runtime
18	1	"Lovely but Lethal"	Jeannot Szwarc	Story by : Myrna Bercovici; Teleplay by : Jackson Gillis	Vera Miles as Viveca Scott	Martin Sheen as Karl Lessing and Sian Barbara Allen as Shirley Blaine	September 23, 1973	70 min
Cosmetics queen Viveca Scott (Vera Miles) has developed a seemingly magic wrinkle remover, but her former lover, Karl Lessing (Martin Sheen), a chemist for her company, knows the formula and intends to sell it to Viveca's rival, David Lang (Vincent Price). Lessing refuses to sell it back to her at any price, and when he taunts Viveca, she bludgeons him to death and covers up her tracks as best she can. Lang's secretary, Shirley Blaine (Sian Barbara Allen), knowing about Lessing's negotiations with Lang, attempts to blackmail Viveca, who kills her too. Final clue/twist: Columbo notices Viveca itching and, as he has developed an itch of his own, he eventually concludes that they both came into contact with poison ivy from the same source. Viveca suspects the wrinkle remover is responsible for her itching, but Columbo tells her the poison ivy was actually on the slide of Lessing's microscope, shards of which they both touched: He did so while examining the crime scene, while she could only have done it around the time of the murder. Mistake: The case turns on there being no other possible source of urushiol because its natural source, poison ivy, is not found near Los Angeles. However, the same allergen is produced by other toxicodendron species including poison oak, which is endemic to California but is frequently not recognized when encountered, particularly by city dwellers. Lessing evidently extracted his urushiol from poison ivy because its species name (Toxicodendron radicans) is written on his blackboard, but he ignored a plentiful local source.
19	2	"Any Old Port in a Storm"	Leo Penn	Story by : Larry Cohen; Teleplay by : Stanley Ralph Ross	Donald Pleasence as Adrian Carsini	Gary Conway as Rick Carsini	October 7, 1973	91 min
Wine connoisseur Adrian Carsini (Donald Pleasence) runs a small winery specializing in unprofitable but prized wines. He is about to be named the wine industry's Man of the Year. His half-brother, Rick (Gary Conway), only interested in making money to spend on his on various hobbies, gets tired of Adrian's indulgences and decides to sell the winery's land to mass producers of cheap, profitable wines. Adrian knocks him unconscious and leaves him to die in an airtight wine cellar. He travels to New York to accept the award and attend wine auctions, at the same time establishing his alibi. Upon his return, he concocts a scuba diving accident to explain Rick's death by suffocation. Julie Harris plays Adrian's formidable secretary, who realizes that Columbo suspects Carsini of killing his brother, and has plans of her own for Carsini. Final clue/twist: Columbo realizes Carsini had locked Rick in the airtight wine cellar with the air conditioning turned off, and realizes further that this happened when a heatwave had struck Los Angeles. Columbo steals a very rare bottle of wine (Ferrier Vintage Port 1945) from Carsini’s cellar, and when he treats Carsini and his secretary to dinner, arranges for the restaurant staff to serve it to them. Carsini, upon tasting the wine, explodes in anger and berates the staff for exposing it to very high temperatures. Columbo tells Carsini that reminds him of the recent heatwave. Carsini realizes that all the wine in his cellar would have been spoiled in the heatwave, so that night he sets out to destroy all the bottles. A heart-broken Carsini is caught in the act by Columbo and confesses, expressing relief that at least he does not have to deal anymore with his secretary, who had guessed the truth and was pressuring him to marry her.
20	3	"Candidate for Crime"	Boris Sagal	Story by : Larry Cohen; Teleplay by : Irving Pearlberg and Alvin R. Friedman and Roland Kibbee & Dean Hargrove	Jackie Cooper as Nelson Hayward	Ken Swofford as Harry Stone	November 4, 1973	94 min
Harry Stone (Ken Swofford), a campaign manager for Nelson Hayward (Jackie Cooper), is coercing the womanizing senatorial candidate to end his affair with his wife Vickie (Joanne Linville)'s personal secretary Linda (Tisha Sterling), which Stone regards as too risky during a campaign. Stone is also the mastermind of a publicity stunt that involves fabricating death threats against Hayward, to promote his tough stance against crime. Hayward uses this to his advantage: he lures Stone to his own beach house (while driving Hayward's car and wearing Hayward's coat), where the candidate shoots and kills Stone, making it look like a case of mistaken identity at the hands of the phantom assassins. Final clue/twist: Hayward, realizing that Columbo is coming closer to solving the murder, stages a phony assassination attempt on himself. He fires a silenced gun through a balcony window into his private hotel room and hours later ignites a firecracker to mimic a gunshot, claiming that someone has just shot at him from outside. When the police express shock at the brazenness of the alleged shooter, he feigns outrage at them doubting his word, and demands that the bullet be removed from the wall and analyzed. Columbo reveals that the ballistics of the bullet are already in—Columbo had searched the room and found the hole in the window and the bullet in the wall while Hayward was out casting his vote—and that it was fired from the weapon that also killed Stone, which not only proves that the assassination attempt had been staged but also that Hayward was Stone's killer. Joanne Linville plays Hayward's wife. A young Katey Sagal has a small role as a secretary. Her father, Boris Sagal, directed the episode.
21	4	"Double Exposure"	Richard Quine	Stephen J. Cannell	Robert Culp as Bart Keppel	Robert Middleton as Vic Norris and Chuck McCann as Roger White	December 16, 1973	70 min
Dr. Bart Keppel (Robert Culp) is a "motivation research specialist" at Impulse Research Labs who has become an expert practitioner of subliminal advertising (which involves inserting frames of an advertised product into the reels of a film, so viewers' subconscious minds react to what is pictured). Keppel's more lucrative sideline is blackmail: he takes pictures of married clients with attractive women he hired to get them in compromising positions. When his latest victim, Vic Norris, refuses to be blackmailed and threatens to expose him, Keppel plots to kill him. Keppel serves salty caviar at a reception he is hosting for his clients prior to showing them his latest promotional film. Subliminal photos of a refreshing drink are inserted into the film, which lure Norris out of the screening room, and Keppel shoots him in the lobby. Keppel is supposedly narrating the film as it is playing, but in reality the clients are hearing Keppel's voice playing from a tape recorder. Keppel has already set in motion a scheme to make it seem that the crime was committed by Norris's wife, whom he had just informed (anonymously) that Norris was cheating on her. Keppel's projectionist, Roger White (Chuck McCann), discovers the cuts in the film and pieces together Keppel's scheme. Keppel murders him as well when Roger tries to blackmail him. Final clue/twist: Columbo uses Keppel’s technique against him. He arranges to splice into a film subliminal cuts of images of Columbo closely searching areas where the evidence must be. On seeing the cuts, Keppel rushes to his office to make sure the evidence is still where he left it. Columbo is waiting there, hidden, and when Keppel retrieves the evidence, a calibration converter that Keppel had used for one of the handguns in his collection, Columbo seizes it. This episode received the Emmy Award in the category for Outstanding Limited Series.
22	5	"Publish or Perish"	Robert Butler	Peter S. Fischer	Jack Cassidy as Riley Greenleaf and John Chandler as Eddie Kane	Mickey Spillane as Alan Mallory and John Chandler as Eddie Kane	January 13, 1974	71 min
Publisher Riley Greenleaf (Jack Cassidy) decides to kill his prolific author Alan Mallory (Mickey Spillane), for the insurance and also to keep him from defecting to another publisher. He hires ex-con and avid homemade bomb enthusiast Eddie Kane (John Chandler) to do the job. While Greenleaf pretends to get drunk at a nearby bar, calling a lot of attention to himself, and even stages a DUI fender-bender accident to establish an alibi, Kane walks into Mallory's apartment and shoots him. To cover his tracks, Greenleaf then kills Kane with one of his own bombs, making it look like an accident. Columbo must discover the link between the two crimes. Final clue/twist: Greenleaf hands over an old synopsis to Columbo, claiming it was Kane’s, which supposedly proves that Kane had the idea for Mallory's latest book, and murdered him out of revenge for Mallory's having stolen it. Columbo finds out, however, that Mallory had rewritten the ending on the advice of his agent, Eileen McRae (Mariette Hartley), to make the book more appealing for a Hollywood film adaptation. Kane could not have known the new ending, so the synopsis must have been written by Greenleaf. In addition, Greenleaf planted a key to Mallory's apartment with Kane. However, he did not know that by this time, Columbo had changed the lock again. Since Kane would not have had a key to the lock Columbo installed, this makes it clear that someone else must have had it made after the murder and planted it. This episode employs a split screen of Greenleaf creating his false alibi and Mallory's murder. Mariette Hartley's role is similar to the one she played in Season 7's "Try and Catch Me". Spillane was the real-life author of Mike Hammer detective mysteries. Cassidy played the villain in three Columbo episodes, the other two being "Murder by the Book" and "Now You See Him..."
23	6	"Mind Over Mayhem"	Alf Kjellin	Story by : Robert Specht; Teleplay by : Steven Bochco and Dean Hargrove & Roland Kibbee	José Ferrer as Marshall Cahill	Lew Ayres as Howard Nicholson	February 10, 1974	70 min
When Dr. Howard Nicholson (Lew Ayres) threatens to expose Neil Cahill (Robert Walker Jr.) for plagiarizing a paper from a recently deceased scientist, Neil's father, Dr. Marshall Cahill (José Ferrer), director of a high-tech Pentagon think tank, kills Nicholson to protect his son's reputation. He programs a robot codenamed MM-7 (Robby the Robot) to take his place overseeing a war exercise. The elder Cahill steals a car from the motor pool and drives to Nicholson's house. In the driveway, Cahill runs over Nicholson, then carries his body into the house, ransacking it to make it look like a burglary. To cover up damage the car sustained from the impact, Cahill backs his own car into it, with many witnesses to the accident. Jessica Walter plays Nicholson's wife, who happens to be Neil's psychotherapist. Final clue/twist: Columbo realizes early on that Marshall is the likely murderer after finding a burned match at Nicholson's home, in light of the fact that Nicholson's wife does not smoke and Nicholson himself used a pipe lighter to smoke his cigars. Although Columbo fails to unearth solid evidence against him, he discovers that Marshall’s motive was based on his love for his son, and decides to frame and arrests Neil, which induces Dr. Cahill to confess.
24	7	"Swan Song"	Nicholas Colasanto	Story by : Stanley Ralph Ross; Teleplay by : David Rayfiel	Johnny Cash as Tommy Brown	Ida Lupino as Edna Brown and Bonnie Van Dyke as Maryann Cobb	March 3, 1974	94 min
Gospel-singing superstar Tommy Brown (Johnny Cash) is unable to enjoy the usual benefits of fame and wealth. His jealous wife Edna (Ida Lupino) can prove he committed statutory rape with one of his backup singers, Maryann, when she was a minor. She watches him carefully when he is touring, and blackmails him into giving all the proceeds from his concerts to her ministry. Tommy decides to kill Edna and Maryann. He drugs both women to sleep while piloting a small, private plane flying to Los Angeles, then parachutes from the plane before it crashes into desert mountains. Brown lands roughly, hurting his leg. He hides the parachute and lies down near the burning plane wreckage, making it seem like he was thrown clear in a tragic crash caused by flying through bad weather. The FAA investigator (John Dehner) is ready to rule the crash was an accident. Edna's brother, Luke (Bill McKinney) appeals to Columbo to consider the case a possible homicide, based on his mistrust of Tommy. Final clue/twist: Columbo’s investigation leads him to conclude that Brown must have used a homemade parachute to jump from the plane, which he then hid somewhere in the mountains. Columbo tells Brown that a boy scout troop will be scouring the mountains for the thermos that contained the drugs. However, Brown seems unperturbed. At the airport, Columbo notices Brown taking his car rental keys with him onto the plane. Because he does not return the keys, Columbo concludes that Brown must be returning to Los Angeles. That night Brown drives up into the mountains and unearths the parachute, but he is caught bringing it back to the rental car by Columbo, hiding in wait. A relieved Brown asks Columbo if he is afraid to be alone with a killer; Columbo plays Brown's songs and says anyone who sings like that cannot be all bad.
25	8	"A Friend in Deed"	Ben Gazzara	Peter S. Fischer	Richard Kiley as Mark Halperin and Michael McGuire as Hugh Caldwell	Rosemary Murphy as Margaret Halperin and an uncredited actress as Janice Caldwell	May 5, 1974	94 min
When Hugh Caldwell (Michael McGuire) accidentally kills his wife during a fight, he calls his friend and neighbor, LAPD Deputy Commissioner Mark Halperin (Richard Kiley). Halperin helps Caldwell cover up the crime, then forces him to assist the following night in the drowning-murder of Halperin's own wife (Rosemary Murphy), a wealthy heiress whose money Halperin covets. Halperin arranges the situation to make it seem that a cat burglar (Val Avery), who has recently been active in their neighborhood, is the culprit in both killings, and orders Columbo to tailor his investigation to that theory. Final clue/twist: Columbo enlists the burglar's help in trapping the true murderers. Columbo creates fake files for the "burglary investigation" on which Halperin had ordered him to concentrate. While perusing the file, ostensibly to help Columbo, Halperin notes the burglar’s address. He hides jewelry taken from one of the murder scenes there, and shortly thereafter leads a raid on that apartment. Columbo confronts Halperin and accuses him of being involved in the murders. Halperin threatens Columbo’s job, and is triumphant when the planted jewelry is found in the searched apartment. However Columbo reveals that he himself is renting the apartment, that the burglar has no connection to it. Since only Columbo and Halperin knew that address, Halperin must have planted the jewelry there, which in turn means he must have been involved in the murders. The first murder victim, Janice Caldwell, is killed before the episode begins, and is seen only as a corpse, and is uncredited.
