= Rick Porter (actor) =

American television actor

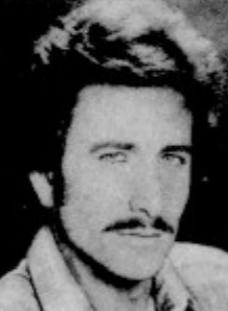
- Porter in 1986
- Born: Richard Johnston Porter II; August 31, 1954; Houston, Texas, U.S.
- Died: February 25, 2013 (aged 58); Houston, Texas, U.S.
- Education: University of Texas at Austin; Columbia University
- Occupation: Television actor

Richard Johnston Porter II (August 31, 1954 – February 25, 2013) was an American television actor. He was best known for playing Larry Ewing in the American soap opera television series Another World.

== Life and career ==
Porter was born in Houston, Texas, the son of Richard Johnston Porter and Evelyn Fay. He attended the University of Texas at Austin, earning his BA degree in drama and acting. He also attended Columbia University, earning his MA degree in screenwriting and directing. He began his screen career in 1978, playing Larry Ewing in the NBC soap opera television series Another World until 1986.

Later in his career, in 1987, Porter starred as a forest ranger in the CBS television film High Mountain Rangers, starring along with Robert Conrad. From 1989 to 1990, he played Hank Tobin in the NBC soap opera television series Days of Our Lives. He guest-starred in television programs including Walker, Texas Ranger and Hunter.

Porter retired from acting in 1994, last appearing in the television pilot Island City. After retiring from acting, he worked in marketing, and was a creative entrepreneur.

== Death ==
Porter died of congestive heart failure at the Saint Luke's Hospital in Houston, Texas, on February 25, 2013, at the age of 58.
