= Columbo season 2 =

Season of television series

Columbo
- Season 2
- No. of episodes: 8

Release
- Original network: NBC
- Original release: September 17, 1972 – March 25, 1973

Season chronology
- ← Previous; Season 1 Next → Season 3

Columbo is an American crime drama television series starring Peter Falk as Lieutenant Columbo, a homicide detective with the Los Angeles Police Department. Season 2 aired on NBC from September 1972 to March 1973.

== Broadcast history ==
The season originally aired in its new, permanent time slot on Sundays at 8:30-10:00 pm (EST) as part of The NBC Sunday Mystery Movie. As with season one, Columbo continued to share the slot in rotation with McCloud and McMillan & Wife, plus the newly added Hec Ramsey.

== DVD release ==
The season was released on DVD by Universal Studios Home Entertainment.

== Episodes ==
No. overall	No. in season	Title	Directed by	Written by	Murderer played by	Victim(s) played by	Original release date	Runtime
10	1	"Étude in Black"	Nicholas Colasanto	Story by : Richard Levinson & William Link; Teleplay by : Steven Bochco	John Cassavetes as Alex Benedict	Anjanette Comer as Jenifer Welles	September 17, 1972	91 min
Alex Benedict (John Cassavetes), the married conductor of the Los Angeles Philharmonic Orchestra, murders his mistress, Jenifer Welles (Anjanette Comer), after she insists on going public with their affair, and tries to make it look like a suicide. Columbo searches for clues to place Benedict at the murder scene. Final clue/twist: During the murder, Benedict loses his signature boutonnière. While conducting that night's concert he realizes its loss and goes back to the now police-crowded crime scene. He recovers the flower and puts it back on. A TV news team records him leaving the house with it, while the recording of the earlier concert shows him being without it. Columbo insists this proves that Benedict must have been there the night of the murder. Witnessing their confrontation, Benedict's wife refuses to support his alibi. Blythe Danner and Myrna Loy guest star as Benedict's wife and her mother, respectively. Pat Morita cameos in one scene as Benedict's butler. During filming, Danner was pregnant with her daughter Gwyneth Paltrow, who was born ten days after the episode aired. The episode was directed by Nicholas Colasanto, who later became known for his role as Coach in Cheers.
11	2	"The Greenhouse Jungle"	Boris Sagal	Jonathan Latimer	Ray Milland as Jarvis Goodland	Bradford Dillman as Tony Goodland	October 15, 1972	70 min
Jarvis Goodland (Ray Milland) and his nephew, Tony (Bradford Dillman), stage Tony's kidnapping in order to break into his trust fund. Heading out to a remote location, the pair fake Tony’s kidnapping by firing a bullet through the window of Tony's beloved Jaguar XKE and then pushes it over a cliff. Tony wants to use his half of the money to bribe his wife's lover to stop seeing her. Jarvis, disgusted at the notion, shoots and kills Tony, whom he has always despised, once the ransom is paid, and a careful swapping of guns with Tony's wife casts suspicion in her direction. Final clue/twist: Columbo searches the greenhouse with a metal detector for a slug Goodland had years earlier fired at a burglar and matches it to the gun which was found in Tony's wife's house, proving Goodland planted the gun there. This episode marks the first appearance of Bob Dishy as Columbo's newly assigned and totally unwanted neophyte partner, Sergeant Frederick Wilson, full of the latest techniques from Berkeley. He appears again in "Now You See Him..." (Season 5, Episode 5). It is also the first episode in which the main crime is committed after Columbo's initial appearance. Gloria, Tony's friend, who believes Tony's wife (Sandra Smith) is the killer and wants to collect a reward, is played by Arlene Martel.
12	3	"The Most Crucial Game"	Jeremy Kagan	John T. Dugan	Robert Culp as Paul Hanlon	Dean Stockwell as Eric Wagner	November 5, 1972	70 min
Paul Hanlon (Robert Culp), the general manager of the Los Angeles Rockets football team, wants to create a sports empire, but Eric Wagner (Dean Stockwell), who inherited the team, lacks ambition. Hanlon sneaks out of the stadium during the national anthem by disguising himself as an ice cream truck driver. He drives to a pay phone near Wagner's home, knowing Wagner's phones have been bugged, and holds a radio to the receiver to make it seem he's in his private box at the stadium. He then drives to Wagner's house and bludgeons him with a piece of ice, which melts in the swimming pool, to make the death appear to be an accident. Complicating matters is Eve Babcock (Valerie Harper), ostensibly a secretary but actually a call girl and an operative placed in Eric's home by a private detective (Val Avery) who was, in turn, hired by Eric's attorney, Walter Cannell (Dean Jagger). James Gregory plays the football team’s coach. Final clue/twist: The phone call Hanlon made to establish his alibi was supposedly made from his private box in the stadium, where there is a chiming clock. Columbo realizes that the chime cannot be heard on the tape of the call, proving it was made from elsewhere.
13	4	"Dagger of the Mind"	Richard Quine	Story by : Richard Levinson & William Link; Teleplay by : Jackson Gillis	Richard Basehart as Nicholas Frame and Honor Blackman as Lillian Stanhope	John Williams as Sir Roger Haversham and Wilfrid Hyde-White as Tanner	November 26, 1972	92 min
Sir Roger Haversham (John Williams) realizes that actors Nicholas Frame (Richard Basehart) and his wife, Lillian Stanhope (Honor Blackman), have manipulated him into backing their theater production. He confronts the couple, and is accidentally killed during the ensuing scuffle. The pair stuff the body into a trunk, take it home to his estate, and stage a fall down the stairs. Columbo is visiting London to study British police techniques as the guest of Scotland Yard Detective Chief Superintendent William Durk (Bernard Fox), who is called to investigate the incident. Sharon Johansen plays Miss Dudley, an attractive young understudy Frame has his eye on, and thus intensely disliked by Stanhope. Wilfrid Hyde-White plays the butler who covers for the couple but later tries to blackmail them and is murdered by Frame. Arthur Malet is the theater doorman who comes into possession of the dead man's umbrella, which becomes vital to the resolution of the case. Final clue/twist: Police search the dead man’s closed umbrella, on exhibit in a wax museum, for a pearl from Lillian Stanhope's broken necklace, which would prove that Haversham visited her dressing room on the night he died, contradicting the couple's story. When the umbrella is opened and a pearl is revealed, the increasingly unstable Frame starts babbling, and Stanhope tries to persuade Columbo that Sir Roger's death was unintentional. Columbo had, however, used his childhood marble-playing skills to shoot the pearl into the umbrella moments before it was opened, recognizing that the chances of a pearl having actually fallen into the umbrella during the incident were much too slim to rely upon. The first of several episodes to feature locations outside the United States, it was filmed in both London and Hollywood.
14	5	"Requiem for a Falling Star"	Richard Quine	Jackson Gillis	Anne Baxter as Nora Chandler	Pippa Scott as Jean Davis and John Colicos as Al Cumberland (photograph)	January 21, 1973	70 min
Jean Davis (Pippa Scott), personal assistant to aging movie star Nora Chandler (Anne Baxter), is engaged to gossip reporter Jerry Parks (Mel Ferrer), and she has secret information about Chandler. Nora deflates the tire of Jean's car so that the engaged couple will have to switch vehicles. Chandler starts a gasoline fire just as Parks's car (being driven by Davis) pulls into his garage. It initially appears that the murderer's intended victim was Parks, but actually Jean was the target. Columbo solves the case after connecting it to the mysterious disappearance of Chandler's husband a decade earlier. Kevin McCarthy appears as a physician and friend of Chandler. Final clue/twist: Columbo remembers that the fountain in Nora's garden does not work, and learns it was purchased the day after her husband disappeared. He tricks Nora into thinking her husband's body might have been discovered. When she rushes home and runs straight to her garden, Columbo, lying in wait, confronts her. She confesses that she killed her husband and buried his body under the fountain, and that Jean knew it and that is why she killed her. Oscar-winning costume designer Edith Head made a cameo appearance as herself.
15	6	"A Stitch in Crime"	Hy Averback	Shirl Hendryx	Leonard Nimoy as Barry Mayfield	Anne Francis as Sharon Martin and Jared Martin as Harry Alexander	February 11, 1973	70 min
Cardiac surgeon Dr. Barry Mayfield (Leonard Nimoy) and Dr. Edmund Hiedeman (Will Geer) have pioneered a major medical breakthrough that Mayfield wants to publish immediately, but Hiedeman wants to wait and do more tests. When Dr. Hiedeman's heart condition worsens, requiring the insertion of a heart valve, Mayfield performs the surgery using non-permanent sutures that will kill his partner when they dissolve. Nurse Sharon Martin (Anne Francis), a friend of Hiedeman, who has never trusted or liked Mayfield, uncovers a suspicious piece of suture, which she takes with her from the operating room. Mayfield observes her doing this and kills Martin in the hospital garage parking area, staging it as a mugging. He later tries to pin the crime on her ex-boyfriend, a former drug addict (portrayed by Jared Martin), and for whose death he is also subsequently responsible. When Mayfield derisively laughs at Columbo, Columbo slams a coffee pot down onto Mayfield's desk and warns him that if Hiedeman dies, the police will have his body autopsied to check what sutures were used in his operation. Final clue/twist: Mayfield operates on Hiedeman again, ostensibly for medical reasons but actually to replace the dissolving sutures. As soon as the procedure is completed, police swarm the operating suite and search for the removed sutures. Mayfield seems to lose his composure, seizing Columbo and rebuking him for interrupting a surgical procedure. No sutures are found and Columbo apologizes to Mayfield for suspecting him. However, after leaving the doctor's office he realizes that Mayfield could have used the scuffle to rid himself of the sutures, since Columbo was not searched. He returns and finds the sutures in the pocket of the surgical scrubs he wore. Nita Talbot plays Marsha, Sharon Martin's roommate.
16	7	"The Most Dangerous Match"	Edward M. Abroms	Story by : Richard Levinson & William Link and Jackson Gillis; Teleplay by : Jackson Gillis	Laurence Harvey as Emmett Clayton	Jack Kruschen as Tomlin Dudek	March 4, 1973	70 min
When Chess Grandmaster Emmett Clayton (Laurence Harvey) loses an impromptu game to Eastern European champion Tomlin Dudek (Jack Kruschen) the night before their championship match, Clayton decides to kill Dudek. The hearing impaired Clayton tricks Dudek into writing what appears to be a suicide note and shoves him into a garbage grinder in the basement. Dudek survives, so Clayton poisons his rival in the hospital before he can regain consciousness. Heidi Brühl plays Linda Robinson, who follows in her mother's footsteps in looking after Dudek. Lloyd Bochner plays Dudek's accompanying coach, Mazoor Berozski. Final clue/twist: Columbo learns that Dudek's injuries were caused by the fall into the grinder rather than by the grinder itself, and that the machinery automatically shuts off if something falls into it while it is in operation. Realizing that someone wanting to kill Dudek would merely have had to turn the grinder back on after it shut itself off, Columbo concludes that Dudek’s attacker did not know the grinder had shut off, which is only possible if the culprit is deaf. This is one of two episodes (the other is season 10's "A Bird in the Hand...") in which Columbo himself is present at a victim's death.
17	8	"Double Shock"	Robert Butler	Story by : Jackson Gillis and Richard Levinson & William Link; Teleplay by : Steven Bochco	Martin Landau in a dual role as Dexter Paris and Norman Paris	Paul Stewart as Clifford Paris and Julie Newmar as Lisa Chambers	March 25, 1973	70 min
Flamboyant television chef Dexter Paris and his identical twin brother, conservative banker Norman (both played by Martin Landau), are supposedly not talking to one another. But both disapprove that their uncle Clifford Paris (Paul Stewart) has become engaged to young, beautiful Lisa Chambers (Julie Newmar). One of the brothers kills uncle Clifford by dropping an electric mixer into the bathtub while he is bathing, electrocuting him. The body is moved to his personal gym to make it seem like he had a heart attack while using an exercise bike, where Chambers finds him. Clifford's lawyer, Michael Hathaway (Tim O'Connor) reveals to the twins that a new will exists that makes Chambers the lone heir of her dead husband, one which he is willing to "lose" for a price. To that effect, he tries to convince Chambers to surrender the remaining copy of the will, in order for her to avoid being incriminated for Paris's death. Instead, the brothers opt to frame Hathaway, who finds Chambers dead after an apparent fall from a window of her house, and make him look like the most likely suspect for their uncle's murder. Unlike most Columbo episodes, this has a whodunit element which is not resolved until the end of the episode. Dabney Coleman plays Columbo's colleague, Detective Murray. Jeanette Nolan plays Mrs. Peck, a sharp-tongued, fastidious, loyal housekeeper who is appalled by the "terrible mess" Columbo makes in the house. Final clue/twist: The audience has seen one of the twin brothers commit the murder, but does not know which one. Both twins try to convince Columbo the other is the killer. Columbo eventually establishes that two persons must have been involved in the murder due to the short time frame between the short circuit caused by the electrocution and the re-powering of the house, and the physical exertion required to drag the dead body out of the bathtub. When confronted, Norman admits to what they did, while Dexter screams at him to shut up.
