= Weekend of Terror =

1970 television film directed by Jud Taylor

- Genre: Thriller
- Written by: Lionel E. Siegel
- Directed by: Jud Taylor
- Starring: Robert Conrad; Carol Lynley; Lois Nettleton; Jane Wyatt; Lee Majors; Kevin Hagen
- Theme music composer: Richard Markowitz
- Country of origin: United States
- Original language: English

Production
- Producer: Joel Freeman
- Cinematography: Les Shorr
- Running time: 74 min.
- Production company: Paramount Television

Original release
- Network: ABC
- Release: December 8, 1970

Weekend of Terror is a 1970 American made-for-television thriller film directed by Jud Taylor and starring Robert Conrad, Carol Lynley, Lois Nettleton and Jane Wyatt. It was aired on December 8, 1970, in the ABC Movie of the Week space.

== Plot ==
A nun returning from a sabbatical is met at a bus station by two of her colleagues. En route to their convent, their car breaks down on a desert road, so they decide to flag down a passing motorist. Meanwhile, two escaped convicts have abducted a local businessman's niece with a scheme to collecting a ransom, only to have the woman die while attempting to flee the abandoned house they are holed up in.

Eddie, the kidnapper under whose watch the victim died, passes the nuns in their disabled Plymouth Belvedere and decides to stop. The nuns mistake him for a helpful motorist and he tows them with his Volkswagen Type II to his hideout (in the opposite direction from Victorville, California, where repair facilities would be accessible). The nuns soon learn their fate and are held hostage in a locked room with boards nailed over the windows.

The kidnappers devise a plan to get the ransom money from the rich uncle (who is unaware his niece is dead) by having one of the nuns pose as the dead girl. Eddie orders accomplice Larry to take Sister Ellen to a wig shop, then to a phone booth where she can call her convent and give false information to explain their not showing up. Larry is something of an unwitting party, not wishing to commit further crimes.

Larry tells the hostages to hide and tells Eddie they have escaped. Eventually the captives are discovered hiding in a closet by Eddie, after which a commotion occurs and he is killed by his own gun. Larry feels forced to take Sister Ellen hostage and attempts to flee by stealing a light aircraft, but before he gets away there is a climactic scene on the runway.

== Cast ==
- Robert Conrad as Eddie
- Carol Lynley as Sister Meredith
- Lois Nettleton as Sister Ellen
- Jane Wyatt as Sister Frances
- Lee Majors as Larry
- Kevin Hagen as Lt. Papich
- Gregory Sierra as Police Sergeant
- Ann Doran as Sister Nadine

== Production ==
The film was shot on location in the desert landscape surrounding Apple Valley, California.

== Reception ==
The film achieved a 37 share and a 23.1 rating, ranking as the 22nd highest-rated made-for-TV movie of the 1970–71 television season.
