= The Bandits (film) =

1967 film

- Directed by: Robert Conrad; Alfredo Zacarías
- Written by: Edward Di Lorenzo; Robert Conrad; Alfredo Zacarías
- Produced by: James M. George; Alfredo Zacarías; Harry Harvey Jr.
- Starring: Robert Conrad; Jan-Michael Vincent; Manuel López Ochoa
- Cinematography: Ted Voigtlander
- Edited by: Gloria Schoemann; Grant K. Smith
- Music by: Manuel Esperón
- Distributed by: Producciones Zacarías S.A.
- Release date: 1967
- Running time: 95 minutes (Mexico); 89 minutes
- Country: Mexico
- Language: English/Spanish

The Bandits/Los Bandidos is a 1967 Mexican/American international co-production starring Robert Conrad who co-wrote and co-directed the film with the producer Alfredo Zacarías. This film was shot in Mexico in 1966 during a hiatus of Conrad's The Wild Wild West television series but the film was not released in the US until May 1979.

Several of the crew such as cinematographer Ted Voigtlander, stunt director Whitey Hughes, co-editor Grant K. Smith and co-producers James M. George and Harry Harvey Jr. worked with Robert Conrad on The Wild Wild West.

== Plot ==
Three Americans drifting through Mexico find themselves caught up in the French intervention in Mexico.

== Cast ==
- Robert Conrad as Chris Barrett
- Roy Jenson as Josh Racker
- Jan-Michael Vincent as Taye 'Boy' Brown
- Manuel López Ochoa as Valdez
- Pedro Armendáriz Jr. as Priest
- María Duval as Señora Valdez
