= Showdown (1973 film) =

1973 film

- 1973 Theatrical Poster
- Directed by: George Seaton
- Screenplay by: Theodore Taylor
- Story by: Hank Fine
- Produced by: George Seaton
- Starring: Dean Martin; Rock Hudson; Susan Clark
- Cinematography: Ernest Laszlo
- Edited by: John W. Holmes
- Music by: David Shire
- Production company: Universal Pictures
- Distributed by: Universal Pictures
- Release date: June 20, 1973
- Running time: 99 minutes
- Country: United States
- Language: English

Showdown is a 1973 American Western film produced and directed by George Seaton and starring Dean Martin, Rock Hudson and Susan Clark.

== Plot ==
Childhood friends Billy Massey and Chuck Jarvis go in opposite directions after Chuck ends up married to Billy's former sweetheart. Billy becomes a bank robber, Chuck a lawman. But they end up joining forces against common enemies in a final showdown. A series of life circumstances put two close childhood friends pitted against each other. The seemingly inevitable ending takes a twist that allows the friendship to continue after Billy commits an act of bravery that he knows is suicidal but saves Chuck's life.

== Cast ==
- Dean Martin as Billy Massey
- Rock Hudson as Chuck Jarvis
- Susan Clark as Kate Jarvis
- Donald Moffat as Art Williams
- John McLiam as F.J. Wilson
- Charles Baca as Martinez
- Jackson Kane as Clem
- Ben Zeller as Perry Williams
- John Richard Gill as Earl Cole
- Philip L. Mead as Jack Bonney
- Rita Rogers as Girl
- Vic Mohica as Big Eye
- Raleigh Gardenhire as Joe Williams
- Ed Begley Jr. as Pook
- Dan Boydston as Rawls

== Production notes ==
It was the final film for Seaton, who three years earlier had directed Martin and an all-star cast in the blockbuster hit Airport. It was also Dean Martin's last western.

In a November 1972 episode of the TV series McMillan & Wife called "Cop of the Year," McMillan (played by Hudson) visits the set of a Western film titled "Showdown" that is in production (directed by Seaton, who plays himself) to ask the special-effects supervisor about how to make a gunshot wound appear on the chest of a gunman—who, in the shot being filmed, is the victim in a showdown.

== Reception ==
Quentin Tarantino later wrote that "the slightness of the whole project is surprising. But along with the pairing of Hudson & Martin, who share the screen for the first time, it's the films low-key modesty that ends up being one of its most charming features." Leonard Maltin awarded this film two-and-a-half stars out of four, calling it "agreeable but unexceptional."
