= Five Desperate Women =

1971 American TV film

- Based on: story by Larry Gordon
- Written by: Marc Norman; Walter Black
- Directed by: Ted Post
- Music by: Paul Glass
- Country of origin: United States
- Original language: English

Production
- Producer: Aaron Spelling
- Editor: Art Seid
- Production company: Aaron Spelling Productions

Original release
- Release: 28 September 1971

Five Desperate Women is a 1971 American TV film directed by Ted Post. It was shown as part of ABC Movie of the Week.

== Plot ==
A violent inmate, whose face is not shown, escapes from a state mental facility. He makes his way to a private beach, drowns a man relaxing on the shore, and steals his work uniform.

Five young women reunite, they are having their five-year college reunion at an exclusive cottage on an isolated island that does not have phone contact with the mainland. Several of the women have personal issues.

Meeker is the captain of the small boat that takes the women to the island. Wylie is the island's caretaker. They argue, both with the women around and in private.

The next morning the island's dog is found dead. Later this day, four of the women return from the beach to discover that the fifth has been strangled to death. They guess it must be Meeker or Wylie who killed her. The women plan to get on the boat and sail off, or at least use its radio to call for help, but as they approach the boat, it explodes.

The four women lock the men out of the cottage and agree not to leave each other alone for the rest of the night. The men are told (through the locked door) that one of the women has been killed, but both say they have no knowledge of it. They tell the women a supply boat will be arriving in the morning and then leave them in the cottage. The women discuss which of Meeker or Wylie they think is the murderer.

In the company cabin, the two men are suspicious of each other, and both resolve not to let the other out of his sight. They discuss the possibility that someone else might be on the island. Later this night, Meeker says he wants to go out to get some air, and when Wylie tries to stop him, they fight. Meeker beats up Wylie and runs away.

The next morning, Meeker and Wylie have a confrontation that reveals Wylie is the murderer. Wylie then kills Meeker and subsequently persuades the women that Meeker was responsible and that they are all now safe. Later, when the supply boat is due, one of the women thanks Wylie for his help. The other women wander the beach while waiting and discover the dead body of the man that was drowned. An identifying bracelet reveals his name is Wylie. The women realize that the man they have come to know as Wylie is an imposter and the killer; they rush to warn their friend.

The lone woman, while talking to Wylie, comes to the realization that he is unbalanced. Just then, the three women approach and call her name. She runs, but he catches her and starts to choke her. Her friends, at first fearful of getting too close to the attack, save her by hitting Wylie over the head with a rock, which kills him. Gasping and being in shock, they make their way to the island's pier.

== Cast ==
- Anjanette Comer as Lucy
- Bradford Dillman as Jim Meeker
- Joan Hackett as Dorian
- Denise Nicholas as Joy
- Stefanie Powers as Gloria
- Julie Sommars as Mary Grace
- Robert Conrad as Wylie
- Connie Sawyer as Mrs. Brown
- Beatrice Manley as Mrs. Miller
