= Barbara Colby =

American actress (1939–1975)

- Barbara Colby in Phyllis
- Born: July 2, 1939; New York City, U.S.
- Died: July 24, 1975 (aged 36); Palms, Los Angeles, California, U.S.
- Cause of death: Gunshot wound
- Education: Bard College
- Occupation: Actress
- Years active: 1964−1975
- Relatives: Ethel Merman, mother-in-law

Barbara Colby (July 2, 1939 – July 24, 1975) was an American actress. She appeared in episodes of numerous television series before a 1974 appearance on The Mary Tyler Moore Show led to a main cast role on the new series Phyllis; after filming three episodes, she and a colleague were murdered outside an acting class, in an unsolved shooting.

== Career ==
Colby started her acting career in the theater. Following a performance in Six Characters in Search of an Author in 1964, she moved to Broadway with a debut in The Devils the following year. Throughout the rest of the decade, she appeared in such plays as Under Milk Wood, Murder in the Cathedral, Dear Liar and A Doll's House and garnered fine reviews for her Portia in Julius Caesar in 1966.

Her first important television role was in the first season of Columbo in an episode titled "Murder by the Book" in 1971. She played guest roles on such established shows as The Odd Couple, McMillan & Wife, The F.B.I., Medical Center, Kung Fu and Gunsmoke.

Colby was a leading actor in the American Conservatory Theater in San Francisco for two years. She appeared in 1970s plays such as Aubrey Beardsley the Neophyte, The House of Blue Leaves, Afternoon Tea and The Hot l Baltimore. She returned to the classics with an off-Broadway role as Elizabeth in Richard III and was back on Broadway with the plays Murderous Angels in 1971 and a revival of A Doll's House in 1975.

In 1974, Colby appeared in two films, California Split and The Memory of Us. In 1975, she had a supporting role in Rafferty and the Gold Dust Twins.

A role as a streetwise prostitute in an episode of The Mary Tyler Moore Show led to an appearance in a subsequent episode. In 1975, Colby appeared as a new regular player on the Mary Tyler Moore Show spin-off Phyllis, starring Cloris Leachman. Colby, who had appeared with Leachman in the TV movie A Brand New Life in 1973, was cast as Leachman's boss, Julie Erskine, the owner of a commercial photography studio.

== Personal life ==
Colby was married to Robert Levitt Jr., whose mother was Ethel Merman.

== Death ==
On July 24, 1975, Colby and acting colleague James Kiernan were walking to their car following an acting class in the Palms district of Los Angeles when they were shot inside a parking area. The murders occurred some time after the first three episodes of the upcoming TV series Phyllis had been filmed.

Colby was killed instantly, but Kiernan was able to describe the shooting to police before he died of his wounds. Kiernan said that he did not recognize the two men who shot them and that the shooting had occurred without warning or provocation. It was normal for Colby and classmates to congregate in the parking lot after acting class and talk. Kiernan told investigators they were approached by two black men in a light-colored van and were each shot once. Police said there was no attempt to rob the pair and concluded it was a random drive-by shooting or a targeted killing. The killers were never identified and the case remained an open cold case.

At the time of her death, Colby was separated from her husband, Bob Levitt. The first three episodes of Phyllis were her final performances, all released in September 1975, but her final on-screen appearance was in the TV movie The Ashes of Mrs. Reasoner, which aired in January 1976. Colby's immediate survivors included her mother and half-sister.

== Filmography ==
Year	Title	Role	Notes
1968	Petulia	Patient	Uncredited
1969	N.Y.P.D.	Lila	Episodes: "Candy Man (Part 1) & (Part 2)"
1971	Columbo	Lilly La Sanka	Episode: "Murder by the Book"
1971	The Odd Couple	Monique	Episode: "Felix, the Calypso Singer"
1972	Look Homeward, Angel	Miss Brown	TV movie
1973	A Brand New Life	Jessica Hiller	TV movie
1973	The F.B.I.	Marti	Episode: "The Exchange"
1973	McMillan & Wife	Linda Comsack	Episode: "The Devil, You Say"
1973	ABC Afterschool Special		Episode: "My Dad Lives in a Downtown Hotel"
1974	Judgment: The Trial of Julius and Ethel Rosenberg		TV movie
1974	Medical Center	Mrs. Polumbo	Episode: "The Conspirators"
1974	Kung Fu	Josie	Episode: "The Nature of Evil"
1974	Memory of Us	Iris	
1974	California Split	Receptionist	
1974	Gunsmoke	Kathy Carter	Episode: "The Iron Men"
1974–1975	The Mary Tyler Moore Show	Sherry Ferris	2 episodes (season 5)
1975	Rafferty and the Gold Dust Twins	Young Woman	
1975	Phyllis	Julie Erskine (original)	Main cast (season 1, episodes 1–3)
1976	The Ashes of Mrs. Reasoner	Muriel Fenton	TV movie

== See also ==
- List of unsolved murders (1900–1979)
