= Coach of the Year (film) =

1980 American television film by Don Medford

- Directed by: Don Medford
- Starring: Robert Conrad; Erin Gray
- Music by: Pete Carpenter; Mike Post
- Country of origin: United States
- Original language: English

Production
- Producer: John Ashley
- Cinematography: Paul Vombrack
- Budget: $1 million

Original release
- Network: NBC
- Release: December 20, 1980

Coach of the Year is a 1980 American TV film about a paraplegic coach, starring Robert Conrad, Erin Gray, Red West and Daphne Reid. It aired on December 20, 1980, on NBC.

== Plot ==
Jim Brandon, a former player for the Chicago Bears, is a returning veteran who has been paralyzed in the Vietnam War. Upon his return to his home town, he tries to get a job as a football coach, but does not get it. He comes up with the idea of becoming the football coach at the Illinois State Training School for Boys in St. Charles after a visit there. Coach Brandon tries to become accepted by the young delinquents at the prison, while coaching them to succeed on the football field.

== Cast ==
- Robert Conrad as Jim Brandon
- Erin Gray as Paula DeFalco
- Red West as Superintendent Turner
- Daphne Reid as Merissa Lane
- David Raynr as Munroe Sweetlife Johnson
- Ricky Paull Goldin as Andy DeFalco
- Alex Paez as Hector Estrada
- Richard Marx as himself (credited as Richard Marks)

== Production ==
The movie was filmed in Batavia, Illinois, including a scene in Dick's Townhouse Tavern, and St. Charles, Illinois, including scenes at the Illinois Youth Center.

It was produced by John Ashley, a former actor who was an old friend of Conrad's.

== See also ==
- List of American football films
