= Jesse Hawkes =

- Genre: Action
- Created by: Tom Blomquist
- Starring: Robert Conrad
- Country of origin: United States
- Original language: English
- No. of seasons: 1
- No. of episodes: 6

Production
- Producer: Tom Blomquist
- Running time: 60 minutes
- Production companies: A. Shane Company with Sibling Rivalries; Black Sheep Productions

Original release
- Network: CBS
- Release: April 21 – May 27, 1989

Related
- High Mountain Rangers

Jesse Hawkes is an American action television series that on CBS aired from April 22 until May 27, 1989. The series is a spin-off of High Mountain Rangers.

== Premise ==
Jesse Hawkes and his two sons track down criminals in San Francisco with the skills they honed in the Sierras.

== Cast ==
- Robert Conrad as Jesse Hawkes
- Christian Conrad as Matt Hawkes
- Shane Conrad as Cody Hawkes

== Episodes ==
No.	Title	Directed by	Written by	Original release date	U.S. viewers (millions)	Rating/share (households)
1	"Pilot"	Robert Conrad	Story by : Joan Conrad & Stephen J. Miller; Teleplay by : Stephen J. Miller	April 22, 1989	13.7	8.9/17
2	"Little Girl Lost"	Paul Tucker	Burt Pearl	April 29, 1989	11.5	7.4/14
3	"The Centurians (a.k.a. Hope & Glory)"	Lyndon Chubbuck	Steven L. Sears	May 6, 1989	12.4	8.0/14
A girl has been missing for a year after being kidnapped from a carousel.
4	"When Good Stockbrokers Go Bad"	Mike Vejar	Paul Bernbaum	May 13, 1989	11.7	7.7/14
A stockbroker robs an armored truck.
5	"The Tenderloin Strangler (a.k.a. Eddy Street)"	Virgil W. Vogel	Jim Byrnes	May 20, 1989	12.4	7.9/15
Jesse is hired to stop a strangler before he strikes again.
6	"Cody's Taken Hostage (a.k.a. Collision Course)"	Roy Campanella II	Jim Byrnes	May 27, 1989	11.6	8.0/16
Cody is taken hostage by a group of bank robbers.
