= Columbo season 4 =

Season of television series

Columbo
- Season 4
- No. of episodes: 6

Release
- Original network: NBC
- Original release: September 15, 1974 – April 27, 1975

Season chronology
- ← Previous; Season 3 Next → Season 5

This is a list of episodes from the fourth season of Columbo.

== Broadcast history ==
The season originally aired Sundays at 8:30–10:00 pm (EST) as part of The NBC Sunday Mystery Movie.

== DVD release ==
The season was released on DVD by Universal Home Video.

== Episodes ==
No. overall	No. in season	Title	Directed by	Written by	Murderer played by	Victim(s) played by	Original release date	Runtime
26	1	"An Exercise in Fatality"	Bernard Kowalski	Story by : Larry Cohen; Teleplay by : Peter S. Fischer	Robert Conrad as Milo Janus	Philip Bruns as Gene Stafford	September 15, 1974	94 min
Renowned exercise guru Milo Janus (Robert Conrad) runs a chain of successful gyms. His charm is not enough to calm the anger of franchise owner Gene Stafford (Philip Bruns), who has found out how Janus overcharges his franchises for equipment and supplies, depositing the profits in offshore bank accounts. When Stafford threatens to organize other victims of Janus and to go public with a class action suit, Janus kills him. He makes it look like Stafford was working out, trying to lift weights too heavy for him, with the result being that the barbell fell and crushed his windpipe. Collin Wilcox plays Ruth Stafford (the victim's distraught and sometimes boozy ex-wife/widow, who thoroughly mistrusts Janus), Gretchen Corbett plays Janus's secretary, and Pat Harrington, Jr. plays a shifty business associate of Janus. Final clue/twist: From the way the shoelaces on the corpse were tied, Columbo deduces that Stafford did not tie his own sport shoes. Columbo concludes that the murderer must have put the shoes on Stafford's feet, when he dressed the corpse in exercise clothing, and only Janus knew before the discovery of the body that Stafford was wearing exercise gear. Throughout the episode multiple hints to the solution are given (including a sustained close-up of the victim's shoes, Columbo tying his own shoes several times, Columbo discussing his shoes with other characters, and a character named "Lacy").
27	2	"Negative Reaction"	Alf Kjellin	Peter S. Fischer	Dick Van Dyke as Paul Galesko	Antoinette Bower as Frances Galesko and Don Gordon as Alvin Deschler	October 6, 1974	91 min
After years of marriage to his domineering wife, Frances (Antoinette Bower), professional photographer Paul Galesko (Dick Van Dyke) decides to kill her. He hires ex-con Alvin Deschler (Don Gordon) to rent an isolated ranch house. Galesko persuades his wife to accompany him there and she grudgingly agrees. He ties her to a chair, photographs the scene, and then shoots her. He sets things up so it will appear he is elsewhere when the pictures were taken. Galesko meets Deschler at a junkyard. After shooting Deschler with a revolver, Galesko shoots himself in the leg with the pistol used in the first murder, then plants that gun on Deschler so that it will appear the "kidnapper" was killed in self-defense. JoAnna Cameron plays Galesko's assistant, with whom he is planning a romantic getaway. Michael Strong, Larry Storch, Vito Scotti, and John Ashton guest star, as does Joyce Van Patten, playing a nun running a homeless shelter who assumes, when she meets Columbo, that he is down and out and in need of some food and a better coat. Final clue/twist: Columbo confronts Galesko with an enlarged, mirror-reversed version of the kidnapping photo. The reversed image shows a clock indicating 10am, a time for which Galesko has no alibi, rather than the correct 2pm. Galesko, amused, points out the mistake, stating that Columbo has made a basic error, and the original photo will prove it. However, Columbo then tells him that the original photo was accidentally destroyed, meaning there is no proof that the clock says 2pm. Irate, Galesko heads straight for a shelf with thirteen cameras, and, without hesitating, grabs the correct camera, stating the negative still inside will prove him right. By this action, Galesko has given himself away. If he were truly innocent, he could not have known which camera had been used in the kidnapping, let alone that the correct negative would be inside it. A defeated Galesko realizes to his astonishment that Columbo had reversed the photo on purpose, hoping Galesko would lose his cool and do exactly what he had just done.
28	3	"By Dawn's Early Light"	Harvey Hart	Howard Berk	Patrick McGoohan as Lyle Rumford	Tom Simcox as William Haynes	October 27, 1974	94 min
Colonel Lyle C. Rumford (Patrick McGoohan), head of the Haynes Military Academy, an all-boys school, is told by the Board of Trustees president William Haynes (Tom Simcox), with whom Rumford has a contentious relationship, that due to declining enrollment it must be converted into a coed school. Haynes also makes clear that Rumford will not be in charge of the revamped institution. Rumford rigs a school cannon by blocking its discharge with a cleaning rag, then modifies a shell with C-4, a more powerful explosive, causing the cannon to explode when Haynes fires it at a ceremonial occasion the next morning, killing him. Rumford attributes the event to an accident he blames on a cadet, Roy Springer (Mark Wheeler), who has a history of behavioral demerits. Eventually Rumford's own fanatical sense of duty provides Columbo the clues that lead to Rumford's incrimination. Final clue/twist: Rumford, an absolute stickler for the academy's rules, is determined to find a bottle of prohibited cider that he knows is on the premises. Columbo himself finds the cider, and realizes there is a connection between it and the murder. After learning everything about the cider's production from the cadets, Columbo has Rumford confirm that he had seen the cider previously, which incriminates him. Columbo notes that Rumford could have seen the cider only on the morning of the murder (as the cider had been hung out to ferment at night, and would therefore only have been visible around sunrise) and only if he was standing very near the cannon. This proves that on the morning of the murder Rumford was not asleep, as he had claimed, but had been at the cannon. With this episode McGoohan won the first of his two Emmy Awards for Outstanding Guest Actor in a Drama Series. His second would be for the 9th-season Columbo episode "Agenda for Murder". Father and son Bruce Kirby and Bruno Kirby co-star, as a police sergeant and an academy cadet, respectively. Bruce Kirby appears in a number of Columbo episodes. Madeleine Sherwood plays Rumford's no-nonsense secretary. Location filming took place at The Citadel in South Carolina.
29	4	"Troubled Waters"	Ben Gazzara	Story by : Jackson Gillis and William Driskill; Teleplay by : William Driskill	Robert Vaughn as Hayden Danzinger	Poupée Bocar as Rosanna Wells	February 9, 1975	93 min
While aboard a Mexican cruise he takes frequently, auto executive Hayden Danziger (Robert Vaughn) has been having an affair with the lounge singer Rosanna Wells (Poupée Bocar). When Wells threatens to expose their affair to Danziger's wife, Sylvia (Jane Greer), Danziger decides to get rid of Wells. To set up his alibi, he inhales some amyl nitrite to feign a heart attack in the swimming pool, so that he will be checked into the ship's hospital. During a lapse in security, Danziger dons a crewman's uniform, sneaks out of his hospital bed, and waits in Wells's cabin for her performance break. When Wells comes back, Danziger shoots her, plants evidence to implicate a band musician, Lloyd Harrington (Dean Stockwell) – who had been in a relationship with Wells before she discarded him for Danziger – ditches the pistol, and returns to the hospital before the doctors can find him missing. Columbo, vacationing on the cruise with his wife, is pressed into service by the ship's captain (Patrick Macnee). Bernard Fox and Robert Douglas also guest star. Final clue/twist: Columbo confides to Danziger that he can only arrest Harrington if they find the gloves he used during the murder, which would have gunpowder residue on them. So Danziger puts on another pair of latex gloves (which he had taken from the ship's hospital) and, down in the ship's engines where he cannot be heard, fires a gun from the magician's show. The gloves are then conveniently left by Danziger to be found by the ship's crew. However when given the gloves to analyze, Columbo is no longer interested in powder burns, instead he finds Danziger's fingerprints on the inside of the gloves.
30	5	"Playback"	Bernard L. Kowalski	Booker Bradshaw & David P. Lewis	Oskar Werner as Harold van Wick	Martha Scott as Margaret Midas	March 2, 1975	70 min
Harold Van Wick (Oskar Werner), the controlling, arrogant, gadget-obsessed president of Midas Electronics, has wired his estate-home with closed-circuit television cameras and video recorders. His mother-in-law Margaret Midas (Martha Scott), who owns the company, and who blames a steep drop in profits on Van Wick's costly fascination with obscure gadgetry, orders him to resign his post by the following morning, or she will expose his philandering ways to his wife, her daughter, Elizabeth (Gena Rowlands). Van Wick has already set in motion a scheme to murder Margaret. He rigs his high-tech home security system and shoots Margaret when she is in the viewing field of one camera, feeding a recording of an empty study to the guard monitoring the estate's rooms. Having already forced open a window and planted footprints outside it to make the murder look like the deed of a burglar, he then uses a timer to play back the tape of the shooting to the gatehouse guard's monitor to make it look like Margaret was shot by an intruder after Van Wick had left the house for a party. Robert Brown played Arthur Midas, Margaret's son and Elizabeth's brother. Patricia Barry plays the owner of an art gallery which provided Van Wick with his ostensible alibi, and Trisha Noble plays her sexy assistant, who may have had an affair with Van Wick. Final clue/twist: Columbo notices, while viewing security monitor recordings from both before and after the murder, that Van Wick's invitation for the party was still on his desk after leaving for the party. Van Wick had presented the invitation to get access to the party that provided his alibi. So Margaret had to have been shot sometime before the security guard viewed it on the monitor, and, more damningly, Van Wick would practically have had to step over the body to retrieve his invitation before leaving for the party.
31	6	"A Deadly State of Mind"	Harvey Hart	Peter S. Fischer	George Hamilton as Mark Collier	Stephen Elliott as Carl Donner and Lesley Ann Warren as Nadia Donner	April 27, 1975	70 min
Psychiatrist Dr. Mark Collier (George Hamilton) is having an affair with one of his patients, rich housewife Nadia Donner (Lesley Ann Warren). One day, Nadia invites Mark to a weekend sex vacation at the Donner beach house. Collier shows up at the beach house only to be unpleasantly surprised by Nadia's husband, Carl (Stephen Elliott). The two men get into a violent confrontation over Collier's affair with and drugging of Nadia, with Carl threatening to damage Collier's reputation. When Collier surprises Carl by attempting to leave with Nadia in tow, Carl attacks him. A scuffle ensues, which ends with Collier bludgeoning Carl with a fireplace poker. After telling Nadia to explain it to the police as a home invasion that turned tragic, done by several masked men, Collier drives off, almost running over a blind man walking his dog past the beach house. Investigating the scene, Columbo is not satisfied with Nadia's version of events, wondering why Nadia didn't see the headlights of the burglars' car. When Columbo tells Collier that Nadia's story is not credible, Collier secretly hypnotizes her into, in effect, committing suicide by taking a deadly dive from her fifth floor balcony into the swimming pool below. Final clue/twist: Columbo claims to have a witness to the first murder. Collier is confronted with the eyewitness, a man wearing dark sunglasses who looks just like the blind man Collier narrowly avoided hitting with his car shortly after the murder. The man settles down on the couch, hands Columbo a match, and then identifies Collier as the driver he saw at around the time of the murder. Collier, as confident as ever, says that he has not been fooled, that he knows the man is blind, and thus cannot be a witness to anything. Collier challenges the man to read from a magazine he hands him, and is stunned when the man does read from it. Columbo reveals that the man is the brother of the actual blind man. But Collier has incriminated himself. In "knowing" that the witness was blind, he has established that he was at the scene of the crime. He has in effect been an eyewitness against himself.
