= Susan Clark =

Canadian actress

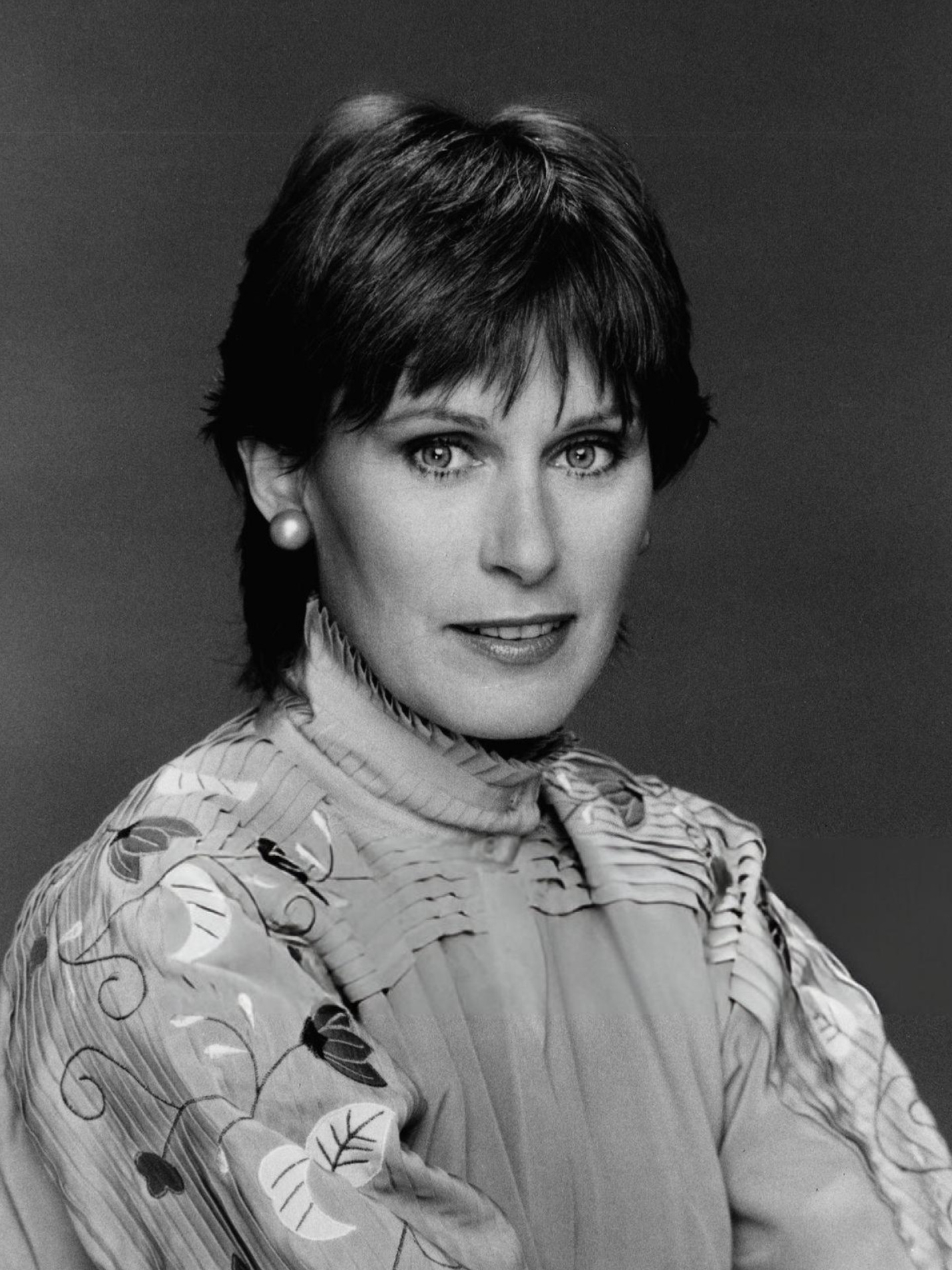
- Clark in 1983
- Born: Nora Golding; March 8, 1943 (age 83); Sarnia, Ontario, Canada
- Occupation: Actress
- Years active: 1963–2007
- Spouses: Bob Joseph (m. 1970; div. 1973) Alex Karras (m. 1980; died 2012)
- Children: 1

Susan Clark (born Nora Golding; March 8, 1943) is a retired Canadian actress. She made her big-screen debut in the 1967 drama film Banning and the following year played the female lead in the crime thriller Coogan's Bluff. She later starred in films Tell Them Willie Boy Is Here (1969), Colossus: The Forbin Project (1971), Valdez Is Coming (1971), Skin Game (1971), Showdown (1973), The Midnight Man (1974), Airport 1975 (1974), Night Moves (1975), The Apple Dumpling Gang (1975), Murder by Decree (1979), Promises in the Dark (1979) and Porky's (1981).

Clark received a Primetime Emmy Award for Outstanding Lead Actress in a Limited or Anthology Series or Movie for playing Babe Didrikson Zaharias in the 1975 television film Babe, and another Emmy Award nomination for playing Amelia Earhart in the 1976 television film Amelia Earhart. From 1983 to 1989, she starred as Katherine Papadopolis in the American sitcom Webster, on which she appeared with her husband, Alex Karras, receiving a Golden Globe Award for Best Actress – Television Series Musical or Comedy nomination in 1985.

== Early life ==
Clark was born Nora Golding in Sarnia, Ontario and raised in Toronto, where she attended Northern Secondary School. She made her professional debut at the age of 15 on stage in the musical Silk Stockings, which starred Don Ameche. She studied acting at the Royal Academy of Dramatic Arts in London, England and two years later acted in a number of classical and modern plays.

== Career ==
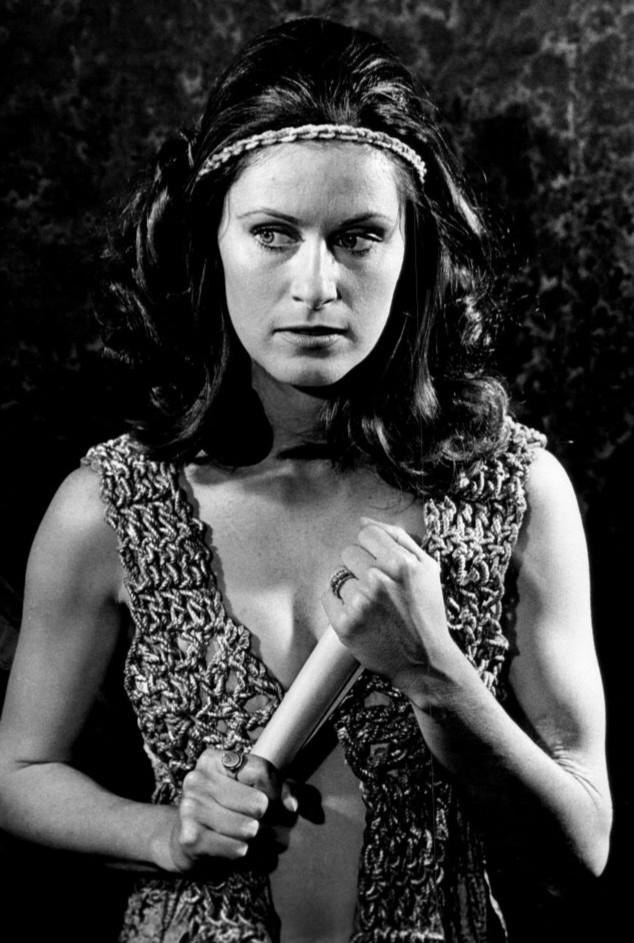
Clark as Lady Macbeth in the 1972 production

In the early 1960s, Clark, while living in London, began appearing on British television, including guest appearances on The Plane Makers, The Sentimental Agent and The Benny Hill Show. She made her debut on the London stage in Poor Bitos. The play and Clark received good reviews but news from home about her father, who had fallen ill, led her back to Canada. She returned to Canada in 1965, when she appeared in a number of episodes of the anthology series Festival.

She was employed by Universal Pictures from 1967 where she appeared in several television series and made her feature film debut in the drama film Banning. Clark had leading roles in several Universal films, including Coogan's Bluff with Clint Eastwood in 1968, Tell Them Willie Boy Is Here with Robert Redford in 1969, Valdez Is Coming with Burt Lancaster in 1971, Showdown with Dean Martin in 1973, Night Moves with Gene Hackman in 1975, the disaster film Airport 1975, The Apple Dumpling Gang with Bill Bixby in 1975, and another disaster film, City on Fire, in 1979.

Clark starred in the 1975 television movie, Babe, playing multi-sport athlete Babe Didrikson Zaharias. Her performance won her an Emmy in 1976. In 1976, she starred in a three-hour made-for-television movie biography of the aviator Amelia Earhart which also covered her marriage to noted publisher G. P. Putnam; she received an Emmy nomination for Best Actress. She posed topless for Playboy in the February 1973 issue pictorial entitled "The Ziegfeld Girls: A dazzling review starring the talking pictures' own Susan Clark".

Clark played Dr. Cleo Markham in Colossus: The Forbin Project, hooker Cherry Forever in Porky's (in which Karras also starred), Elizabeth Murray in Emily of New Moon, Elaine Moore in the television movie Trapped, and Muriel Mulligan in the 1994 television movie Snowbound: The Jim and Jennifer Stolpa Story. She played murderess Beth Chadwick in the Columbo episode "Lady in Waiting". She and Karras played husband and wife together on the sitcom Webster for six years in the 1980s.

In 2006, Clark appeared at the Manitoba Theatre Centre in the Warehouse production of The Retreat from Moscow, and in the 2007 Mainstage production of The Importance of Being Earnest.

== Personal life ==
She married American football player turned actor Alex Karras in 1980. They met when they co-starred in Babe (and he played her husband, professional wrestler George Zaharias). They later co-starred on the popular primetime sitcom Webster together, portraying husband and wife. Their daughter Katie was born in 1980.

Clark and Karras remained married for 32 years until his death on October 10, 2012.

== Filmography ==
=== Film ===
Year	Title	Role	Notes
1967	Banning	Cynthia Linus	
1968	Madigan	Tricia Bentley	
1968	Coogan's Bluff	Julie Roth	
1969	Tell Them Willie Boy Is Here	Dr. Elizabeth Arnold	
1970	Skullduggery	Dr. Sybil Greame	
1970	Colossus: The Forbin Project	Dr. Cleo Markham	
1971	Valdez Is Coming	Gay Erin	
1971	Skin Game	Ginger / Miss Abigail Blodgett	Nominated — NAACP Image Award for Outstanding Actress in a Motion Picture
1973	Showdown	Kate Jarvis	
1974	The Midnight Man	Linda Thorpe	
1974	Airport 1975	Helen Patroni	
1975	Night Moves	Ellen Moseby	
1975	The Apple Dumpling Gang	Magnolia Dusty Clydesdale	Nominated — Golden Apple Award for Female New Star of the Year
1979	Murder by Decree	Mary Jane Kelly	
1979	The North Avenue Irregulars	Anne Woods	
1979	City on Fire	Diana Brockhurst-Lautrec	
1979	Promises in the Dark	Fran Koenig	
1980	Deadly Companion	Paula West	
1981	Nobody's Perfekt	Carol	
1981	Porky's	Cherry Forever	

=== Television ===
Year	Title	Role	Notes
1963	The Plane Makers	Janet	"A Good Night's Work"
1963	Emergency – Ward 10	Phyllis Armour	"1.637", "1.639"
1963	The Sentimental Agent	Philippa	"Finishing School"
1965	The Benny Hill Show	Various	"Police: Friend or Foe?"
1965	Festival	Cathy / Heloise	"Horror of Darkness", "Heloise and Abelard"
1966	Festival	Mabel Chiltern	"An Ideal Husband"
1966	Seaway	Kate Lynch	"Trial by Fire"
1967	Bob Hope Presents the Chrysler Theatre	Helen Silbey	"Blind Man's Bluff"
1967	The Virginian	Melanie Kohler	"Melanie"
1967	Run for Your Life	Kathryn Aller	"Cry Hard, Cry Fast: Parts 1 & 2"
1968	Something for a Lonely Man	Mary Duren	TV film
1969	Marcus Welby, M.D.	Ruth Ann Adams	"Hello, Goodbye, Hello"
1970	The Challengers	Catherine "Cat" Burroughs	TV film
1971	The Bold Ones: The Lawyers	Ellen McKay	"In Defense of Ellen McKay"
1971	Columbo	Beth Chadwick	"Lady in Waiting"
1972	The Astronaut	Gail Randolph	TV film
1972	Poet Game	Diana Howard	TV film
1972	Marcus Welby, M.D.	Judy Graham	"Please Don't Send Flowers"
1972	The Bold Ones: The New Doctors	Janice Morrow	"An Inalienable Right to Die"
1973	Trapped	Elaine Moore	TV film
1974	Double Solitaire	Barbara Potter	TV film
1974	Barnaby Jones	Karen Maybury / "Leila Evanston"	"Woman in the Shadows"
1975	Babe	Mildred "Babe" Didrikson Zaharias	TV film Primetime Emmy Award for Outstanding Lead Actress in a Limited or Anthology Series or Movie
1976	McNaughton's Daughter	Laurel McNaughton	TV miniseries
1976	Amelia Earhart	Amelia Earhart	TV film Nominated — Primetime Emmy Award for Outstanding Lead Actress in a Limited or Anthology Series or Movie
1978	Hedda Gabler	Hedda Gabler	TV film
1980	Jimmy B. & André	Stevie	TV film
1981	The Choice	Kay Clements	TV film
1981	Standing Room Only	Madge Larrabee	"Sherlock Holmes"
1982	Maid in America	Catherine Abel	TV film
1983–89	Webster	Katherine Calder-Young Papadapolis	150 episodes Nominated — Golden Globe Award for Best Actress – Television Series Musical or Comedy (1985)
1991	Murder, She Wrote	Meredith Hellman	"Moving Violation"
1994	Snowbound: The Jim and Jennifer Stolpa Story	Muriel Mulligan	TV film
1994	Tonya & Nancy: The Inside Story	LaVona Harding	TV film
1995	Butterbox Babies	Lila Young	TV film Gemini Award for Best Performance by an Actress in a Leading Role in a Dramatic Program or Mini-Series
1996	Toe Tags	Trent's Mother	TV film
1998–99	Emily of New Moon	Aunt Elizabeth Murray	43 episodes
