= High Mountain Rangers =

American adventure drama series

- Genre: Action
- Created by: Robert Conrad; David J. Kinghorn
- Directed by: Joan Conrad; Robert Conrad
- Starring: Robert Conrad
- Opening theme: "High Mountain Rangers" performed by Lee Greenwood
- Composer: Robert Folk
- Country of origin: United States
- Original language: English
- No. of seasons: 1
- No. of episodes: 12

Production
- Executive producer: Joan Conrad
- Running time: 60 minutes
- Production companies: A. Shane Company with Sibling Rivalries; Black Sheep Productions

Original release
- Network: CBS
- Release: January 2 – April 9, 1988

Related
- Jesse Hawkes

High Mountain Rangers is an American adventure drama series about a group of highly trained wilderness search and rescue/law enforcement officers in Tahoe, Nevada.

It starred Robert Conrad as Jesse Hawkes and also starred his two sons, Christian Conrad and Shane Conrad. Robert's daughter Joan was the executive producer. 12 episodes were broadcast, from January 2 until April 9, 1988 on CBS, before the show was cancelled. The series also had a spin-off titled Jesse Hawkes.

The series was centered on Jesse Hawkes, an ex-Marine who started the High Mountain Rangers 35 years before the pilot. He retired after hauling his long-time nemesis, murderous criminal mastermind T.J. Cousins, to justice. Spared the death penalty on a legal technicality, Cousins instead was given life imprisonment without eligibility for parole. Meanwhile, Jesse's eldest son Matt tries out for the HMRs and eventually becomes the team's #2 Ranger...after Merlin (guest star Rick J. Porter as Ranger "Merlin" Pierce) who succeeded Jesse as director. Then Cousins gets broken out of jail by a drug dealer needing his mountain skills, and fatally ambushes Merlin. Now, as the team's third director, Matt urges his father out of retirement to help the Rangers recapture Cousins.

== Cast ==
Each Ranger had a call sign (e.g., "Top Gun", "Merlin", "Flying Tiger"); this was used whenever the HMRs were in the field.

- Robert Conrad as Jesse "Top Gun" Hawkes
- Christian Conrad as Matt "Flying Tiger" Hawkes
- Shane Conrad as Cody Hawkes
- Russell Todd as Jim "Flash" Cutler
- Pa Neumüller (billed as P.A. Christian) as Robin "Frostbite" Kelly
- Timothy Erwin (Robert Conrad's real-life son-in-law) as Izzy "the Pocatello Kid" Flowers
- Eugene Williams as Tim "Black Magic" Hart
- Tony Acierto as Frank "White Eagle" Avila
- Guest star Rick J. Porter as Ranger "Merlin" Pierce

== Episodes ==
No.	Title	Directed by	Written by	Original release date
1	"The Only Place to Live"	Paul Tucker	Brad Radnitz	January 2, 1988
2	"Old Friends, New Friends"	Elizabeth Lindberg	Story by : Robert Conrad & David J. Kinghorn; Teleplay by : David J. Kinghorn	January 9, 1988
3	"The Trial of Jesse Hawkes"	Robert Conrad	Story by : David J. Kinghorn & Robert Conrad; Teleplay by : David J. Kinghorn	January 16, 1988
4	"The Competitors"	Georg Fenady	Del Reisman	January 23, 1988
5	"War Games"	Rob Iscove	Harv Zimmel	January 30, 1988
6	"The Run of Her Life"	Liz Lindberg	Brad Radnitz	February 6, 1988
7	"Mr. Right"	James Roberson	Brad Radnitz	February 13, 1988
8	"Sacred Ground"	Paul Tucker	Story by : Lars Palo; Teleplay by : Lars Palo & Joan Erwin	February 20, 1988
9	"The Wild"	Georg Fenady	Sidney Ellis	February 27, 1988
10	"Ordeal"	Joan Conrad	Ray Cunneff	March 5, 1988
11	"Asylum"	James Roberson	Paul Savage	March 19, 1988
12	"Matt's Choice"	Liz Lindberg	Brad Radnitz	April 9, 1988
