= Trapped (1973 film) =

- Written by: Frank De Felitta
- Directed by: Frank De Felitta
- Starring: James Brolin; Susan Clark; Earl Holliman; Robert Hooks
- Music by: Gil Mellé
- Country of origin: United States
- Original language: English

Production
- Executive producer: Richard Irving
- Producer: Gary L. Messenger
- Cinematography: Fred Mandl
- Editors: Larry Lester; John F. Schreyer
- Running time: 74 minutes
- Production company: Universal Television

Original release
- Network: ABC
- Release: November 14, 1973

Trapped is a 1973 American made-for-television action thriller film starring James Brolin, Susan Clark, Earl Holliman and Robert Hooks. It originally aired as an ABC Movie of the Week on November 14, 1973. It was released theatrically in the UK as Doberman Patrol in mid-June 1974.

== Synopsis ==
Chuck Brenner and his daughter, Carrie, shop for a hard-to-find "Billy Jo" doll at a Noonan's Department Store. Chuck's ex-wife, Elaine, arrives to pick up Carrie. They argue, Chuck not happy that she's moving with Carrie to Mexico City that night with David Moore, her current husband, and disrupting his visitation rights. A cashier tells them that the doll is out of stock in the store but she's having one sent by messenger from their warehouse. Chuck lets Elaine and Carrie leave for dinner while he waits for the doll to arrive. The cashier, Miss Havermeyer, has to go to the main office to break the large bill Chuck pays with, so he starts to smoke. But noticing the store sign that says smoking is only allowed in restaurants, lounges and restrooms, he heads to the men's restroom. Inside, he's attacked by two young muggers. Chuck fights back but is knocked out cold with a blackjack. They steal his watch, cash and other valuables before locking him inside one of the stalls, but leave the doll.

Meanwhile, Elaine meets David at the VIP lounge at the airport. Carrie solemnly waits for her father, declining dinner until he arrives. David is a reasonable man and believes something may have happened to Chuck, but Elaine is cynical and thinks Chuck is just irresponsible and got drunk somewhere. Their flight is called to board. Carrie still resents David for displacing her father.

The store closes and Hanrahan's guard dogs sets up, releasing six extremely aggressive attack dogs, one on each floor, after erecting tall barriers at each escalator. The men are all wearing heavily padded, full-body bite suits with mesh helmets. The leader walks with a cane and a very pronounced limp, as if he had been mauled by a dog once. They turn off all the circuit breakers in the store, including the elevators, before leaving.

Chuck comes to. Picking up the doll the robbers left behind, he leaves the restroom, but he's still woozy from the attack. He calls for an elevator, which doesn't come. The dog on his floor hears him. Chuck manages to close the glass door just before the dog reaches him, blocking it with his body. He sees a stairway but can't reach it without letting the door go. The dog from the third floor manages to jump and claw its way over the escalator barrier, and the two dogs begin to fight. Chuck, seeing his chance, runs for the stairway, with dogs giving chase. He locks the stairway door behind him. Dizzy, he falls, letting out a grunt which alerts two other dogs stationed at the bottom of the stairwell. He runs back to the third floor, but not before one of the dogs bites his leg.

At the airport, the flight to Mexico City is delayed and de-boarded to fix a loose cowling on an engine.

In the store, Chuck wraps his leg and tries to rinse the wound with some liquor. His painful scream attracts another dog, which tries to get over the escalator barrier. He runs into the office, where he tries to use the phone, but all the lines are dead with no switchboard operator. His leg is bleeding badly, so he uses his belt as a tourniquet around his thigh. Cautiously leaving the office, he makes his way to the pay phones that require coins for dial tones (e.g. even for emergency calls), but finds that the robbers have taken all of his change. He's still bleeding badly from his leg wound.

Still waiting in the airport lounge for the plane's repairs to be finished, David suggests that Elaine try calling the bars she expected Chuck to be in. Neither have seen Chuck. David wants to go out and look for Chuck, which frustrates Elaine. But David insists, being a decent man and not wanting Carrie to hate him for the rest of his life as "the guy who took her away from her daddy." He's willing to do whatever it takes to allow Carrie a proper farewell, even if it means waiting several days.

Still trapped in the store, Chuck releases the tourniquet and massages his leg to get some circulation back before reapplying the belt. He looks for weapons against the dogs in the housewares section before stumbling through the draperies section. Crashing into a display of flat mops, he sights the paints section and has an idea for the paint thinner.

Elaine drops Carrie off with her sister so she and David can search the bars for Chuck. She tells him about Chuck's threat to sue her for taking Carrie across the border. David is upset that she wants to run away instead of facing the legal challenge.

Chuck unhooks one of the barriers, then lights a thinner-soaked mop and uses it to back one of the dogs into the office, pulling the door closed behind it.

David and Elaine check a bar. The bartender doesn't remember most of the customers from the busy hour, so Elaine pulls a photograph from her purse. He says he definitely would have remembered the strapping former football player if he had come into the bar. Inside the car, Elaine and David talk, with him insisting that they air out their issues, that maybe Elaine still loves Chuck but they need to be honest to make their own marriage work. He suggests that next they go to the police.

Chuck gathers more mops and thinner for more attacks. He searches for his dropped matchbook, finding there's only one left. Ransacking the table wares section, he finds that none of the table lighters work and the smoke shop is on the main floor. In a fit of rage, he kicks over a tea display, which starts his leg bleeding again.

The police tell the couple that people must be missing 48 hours before they can do anything. David again insists that a man who loves his daughter so much wouldn't just drop out of sight voluntarily. Sergeant Connaught tries calling Chuck's home and work phones but gets no answer. David suggests Chuck may have been in an accident, which the sergeant agrees to check.

Getting to the second floor, Chuck sees another office door, but it's locked. Seeing a fire sprinkler, he has an idea for his last match. He climbs atop an armoire and tries to set it off, but another dog vaults the barrier and startles him into dropping the lit match.

The sergeant tells David that there were no hospital admissions matching Chuck's description, but there was a white male at the morgue hit by a subway and badly mangled. David doesn't want Elaine to have to positively identify the corpse but she insists. At the morgue, the sight of the mutilated body makes her faint.

Cornered by a dog atop an armoire, Chuck sees an open one at the end of the row. He walks on top of the armoires toward it. At the end, he drops a dummy which the dog quickly shreds. He uses his jacket to distract the dog, then topples the armoire onto it, trapping it inside.

Elaine and David leave the morgue. Elaine now wants to find Chuck, worried that he's lying dead somewhere. David mentions she may have been right and that Chuck may have left with another woman rather than face saying goodbye to Carrie. Elaine remembers that Miss Havermeyer was pretty and flirty and Chuck seemed interested. She begs David to help her call up any Havermeyers in the phone book.

On the mezzanine, Chuck sees the front entrance doors. But one more dog is in the middle of the main floor between him and the door. There's an archery kit and a fishing rod on a display table in the sporting goods section. Hauling himself over the mezzanine railing, he drags himself along the ledge until he can just barely grab the tip of the rod. On the verge of passing out from his blood loss, he uses his belt to strap himself to the rail behind him and keep him from falling off as he fishes for the archery set. Finally hooking it after numerous tries, he drops one of the arrows. Readying a second, he begins to see double and misses with his shot. He finally passes out.

David reaches Miss Havermeyer on the pay phone after waking up numerous Havermeyers. She tells them that Chuck left without his umbrella and $44 worth of change. David wonders if Chuck is still inside. They call the sergeant, who arranges to meet them there. Police records show Hanrahan's is in charge of security, and Connaught realizes the extreme danger Chuck might be in.

The last dog leaps the railing and then onto the ledge, slowly making its way toward the semi-conscious Chuck until they're face to face. Elaine, David and Connaught arrive along with the three Hanrahan's men in bite suits. The men try to lure the barking dog down with yelling and gestures while the sergeant aims his pistol in case the dog attacks Chuck. Elaine watches terrified and helpless while a delirious Chuck sees an otherworldly scene of three strange, almost demonic forms yelling and waving. The dog finally attacks the lead handler and is caught in a snare. Chuck regains consciousness on a gurney, Elaine and David looking on with relief and happiness.

== Cast ==
- James Brolin as Chuck Brenner
- Susan Clark as Elaine Moore
- Earl Holliman as David Moore
- Robert Hooks as Sergeant Connaught
- Bob Hastings as The Bartender
- Ivy Jones as Connie Havemeyer
- Elliott Lindsey as Mr. Higgins
