= Columbo season 1 =

Season of television series

Columbo
- Season 1
- No. of episodes: 7

Release
- Original network: NBC
- Original release: September 15, 1971 – February 9, 1972

Season chronology
- Next → Season 2

Here is a list of episodes from the first season of the American television detective series Columbo.

== Prior history and broadcast ==
Prior to the broadcast of "Murder by the Book", NBC aired two pilots of the show, both with Falk as Columbo and writing by Richard Levinson & William Link. As a regular series for the first season, it originally aired Wednesdays at 8:30–10:00 pm (EST) as part of The NBC Wednesday Mystery Movie.

== DVD release ==
The season was released on DVD by Universal Home Video. The DVD includes the two pilot movies: Prescription: Murder and Ransom for a Dead Man.

== Episodes ==
No. overall	No. in season	Title	Directed by	Written by	Murderer played by	Victim(s) played by	Original release date	Runtime
3	1	"Murder by the Book"	Steven Spielberg	Steven Bochco	Jack Cassidy as Ken Franklin	Martin Milner as Jim Ferris and Barbara Colby as Lilly La Sanka	September 15, 1971	72 min
Ken Franklin (Jack Cassidy) is one-half of a mystery writing team, but partner Jim Ferris (Martin Milner), who does all the actual writing, wants to go solo, leaving the high-living Franklin without his cash cow. However, the pair have an insurance policy on which Franklin can collect if Ferris dies during the partnership. He tricks Ferris into taking a trip to Franklin's remote cabin two hours away. They stop at a general store, where, as Franklin makes a phone call to Ferris's wife (Rosemary Forsyth) to establish an alibi, the owner Lilly La Sanka (Barbara Colby)—obviously smitten with Franklin—peers outside to see who Franklin brought with him, and sees Ferris in the passenger seat of the car. At the cabin, Franklin convinces Ferris to call his wife and tell her he is working late at the office. During the phone call, Franklin shoots Ferris. He drives two hours back to his house with his dead partner in the trunk, dumping the corpse on his own lawn. Franklin also arranges evidence to create the appearance that Ferris was investigating gangsters. La Sanka tracks Franklin to Los Angeles when he is out on a date and loudly approaches him, making it clear that she knows Franklin killed Ferris, forcing him to cancel his date. He brings her the $15,000 she wants for her silence, feigning interest in her. The two have an intimate dinner in the back of her store, then he bludgeons her and puts her body in a boat, which he capsizes to make her death appear accidental. Final clue/twist: After hearing that Ferris habitually wrote down ideas for his mystery novels on whatever paper was handy, Columbo searches his office and house and finds a note with the fake phone call/alibi scheme. He confronts Franklin with it, and Franklin confesses. Upon his arrest, Franklin says that the alibi idea was in fact his, the only good one he ever had. Jack Cassidy played the murderer in three Columbo episodes, the other two being, episode 22, "Publish or Perish" in Season 3, and episode 36, "Now You See Him", in Season 5. Note: In 1997 TV Guide ranked this episode number 16 on its '100 Greatest Episodes of All Time' list. The Mrs. Melville novel that is frequently seen in the episode is named "Prescription: Murder", the same name as Columbo's first pilot episode.
4	2	"Death Lends a Hand"	Bernard Kowalski	Richard Levinson & William Link	Robert Culp as Investigator Brimmer	Patricia Crowley as Lenore Kennicut	October 6, 1971	72 min
Investigator Brimmer (Robert Culp), the very tough, hard-nosed head of a private detective agency, with unfortunate and fateful anger issues, is hired by Arthur Kennicut (Ray Milland), a powerful publishing magnate who suspects his wife, Lenore (Pat Crowley), of infidelity. Although Brimmer indeed finds evidence of her being unfaithful, instead of reporting this fact to his client, he attempts to blackmail Lenore into obtaining business and political secrets from her husband. She refuses and tells him she will expose his plot to her husband, at which point Brimmer accidentally kills her in a fit of rage. He then dumps her body at a scrapyard. When Columbo begins investigating Lenore's death, Kennicut hires Brimmer to help. Concerned of getting found out, Brimmer tries to divert suspicion away from himself and even offers Columbo a job. Final clue/twist: Columbo becomes suspicious when he realizes a cut on the victim's face matches Brimmer's ring. He disables Brimmer's car, causing the vehicle to be garaged for repair. He has Lenore's body exhumed, then claims that one of her contact lenses was not with the body and is missing. He tells Kennicut the lens may be at the place where she was murdered, which gets overheard by Brimmer. After searching for it in his home, Brimmer goes to the garage after-hours and searches in the trunk of his car that was used to transport the body. He finds a contact lens, but is caught by Columbo, with Kennicut in tow. When Brimmer tries to throw the lens away, the police stop him, and he confesses. After Brimmer is led away, Columbo admits to Kennicut he had arranged everything, and that there never was a missing contact lens. Robert Culp played the murderer in two other Columbo episodes: episode 12 ("The Most Crucial Game"), and episode 21 ("Double Exposure"). He also appeared in "Columbo Goes to College" as the father of the murderer. Notes: This episode won an Emmy for writing and is known for the "glasses effect" after Brimmer kills Lenore, in which both lenses of Brimmer's glasses simultaneously show different images on-screen of him cleaning the scene of the crime.
5	3	"Dead Weight"	Jack Smight	John T. Dugan	Eddie Albert as Martin Hollister	John Kerr as Roger Dutton	October 27, 1971	72 min
Major General Martin Hollister (Eddie Albert), a retired Marine Corps war hero, learns he is being investigated for embezzling military funds, then shoots his skittish accomplice, Col. Dutton (John Kerr). The murder is witnessed by Helen Stewart (Suzanne Pleshette), who was in a passing boat. She is gaslit by Hollister into doubting her own story. Noted Canadian actress Kate Reid plays Helen's disbelieving mother, who is favorably impressed by the distinguished Hollister. Final clue/twist: After an encounter with a nostalgic cook, Columbo realizes that Hollister would never have lost his signature revolver. Columbo retrieves the weapon, which Hollister claimed was a replica made for his museum display, and the police forensic unit identifies it as the weapon that killed Dutton.
6	4	"Suitable for Framing"	Hy Averback	Jackson Gillis	Ross Martin as Dale Kingston and Rosanna Huffman as Tracy O'Connor	Robert Shayne as Rudy Matthews and Rosanna Huffman as Tracy O'Connor	November 17, 1971	72 min
Art critic Dale Kingston (Ross Martin) murders his uncle and tries to frame his aunt (Kim Hunter) to inherit his uncle's very valuable art collection. He later murders his lover and accomplice in the crime, art student Tracy (Rosanna Huffman). Final clue/twist: Kingston hides the paintings that he stole after the murder in his aunt's house to frame her, then arranges a police search, ostensibly to clear his aunt of suspicion. Columbo has the police dust the paintings for fingerprints, and find Columbo's own fingerprints from when he touched the paintings during a visit to Kingston's home. Kingston says Columbo must have touched the paintings moments ago, but Columbo shows that he has been wearing gloves. Don Ameche portrays the family lawyer, Frank Simpson, while Mary Wickes plays Tracy's redoubtable landlady.
7	5	"Lady in Waiting"	Norman Lloyd	Story by : Barney Slater; Teleplay by : Steven Bochco	Susan Clark as Beth Chadwick	Richard Anderson as Bryce Chadwick	December 15, 1971	72 min
Beth Chadwick (Susan Clark) murders her domineering older brother, Bryce (Richard Anderson), after he attempts to break up her relationship with one of his executives, Peter Hamilton (Leslie Nielsen), a man he thinks is only interested in Beth for ulterior motives. He mails a letter threatening to terminate Peter's employment if he doesn't break things off with Beth, causing her to reach the tipping point and act to gain control of her own life and, it turns out, the family business. Complications in Beth's plan contribute to Columbo's suspicions. Beth had planned to claim the shooting was an accident. She removed Bryce's house key from his key chain, thinking it would require him, late at night, to try to enter the house via her bedroom. However, Bryce had a spare key which he had hidden in a flowerpot. She improvises as best she can but her story is ultimately undermined by the facts. Meanwhile, her true personality emerges, showing a very different side than that shown before the murder, and leading to the end of her relationship with Hamilton. Final clue/twist: When Columbo re-reads the testimony of Hamilton, who had driven to the house after receiving the letter from Bryce, he notices that Hamilton climbed over the gates and heard the gunshots before the alarm went off, not after. The detail is enough to undo her entire story. Columbo tells Beth that Hamilton won't like doing it, but he will testify to what he knows. The Chadwick siblings' mother is played by veteran actress Jessie Royce Landis in her final performance not long before her death.
8	6	"Short Fuse"	Edward M. Abroms	Story by : Lester Pine & Tina Pine and Jackson Gillis; Teleplay by : Jackson Gillis	Roddy McDowall as Roger Stanford	James Gregory as David Buckner and Lawrence Cook as Quincy	January 19, 1972	72 min
Roger Stanford (Roddy McDowall) is a chemist whose uncle, David (James Gregory), has taken over a business that his parents built and his aunt (Ida Lupino) controls. David plans to sell the business to a conglomerate, and threatens to reveal Roger's scandalous doings at the office to his aunt if he does not quit. Roger is unbothered, since he has already has a plan in motion to murder his uncle. David is killed by a box of cigars rigged to explode as he drives through the mountains with his chauffeur. William Windom guest stars as Everett Logan, the next-in-line vice president whom Roger discredits as part of the offshoot of the murder, so Roger can take over the company. Anne Francis plays David's secretary, who is romantically involved with Roger. Lawrence Cook plays David's chauffeur and right hand man. Final clue/twist: At the end of the episode, Columbo, Roger, and Everett take a cable car up the mountain. Columbo shows them a damaged but seemingly intact box of cigars and tells them it came from the car wreck, indicating that David and his chauffeur were in fact killed by the car's gas tank exploding and not a bomb. Thinking they are the booby-trapped cigars he had planted, Roger screams at Columbo and tries to get rid of the box. Columbo then reveals that the box is not from the car but is another box from David's belongings.
9	7	"Blueprint for Murder"	Peter Falk	Story by : William Kelley; Teleplay by : Steven Bochco	Patrick O'Neal as Elliot Markham	Forrest Tucker as Beau Williamson	February 9, 1972	71 min
Elliot Markham (Patrick O'Neal) is an architect with a vision for a city of the future, and a penchant for classical music. His latest project is being bankrolled by the young wife of Beau Williamson (Forrest Tucker), a wealthy industrialist who has been away on a lengthy overseas business trip. When Williamson returns and finds out how his money is being spent, he is furious, and intends to cut off the funds. Markham decides that the only way he can continue his work is to eliminate Williamson. Simply killing him, however, poses a problem, because his money reverts to a trust fund when he dies. Markham comes up with a clever plan to conceal the body and make it appear as if Beau has gone on another long foreign trip. With Pamela Austin and Janis Paige as the wives, present and past, in Williamson's life. Final clue/twist: Markham repeatedly goads Columbo into excavating a building site to search for Williamson's body, until Columbo finally does so. It yields nothing. Later that night Markham returns to that site with the body, assuming no-one would ever look there again. However Columbo has known what Markham has been up to all along, he emerges from the shadows with other policemen and arrests Markham. Columbo reveals that he knew something had happened to Williamson when he checked his car and found the radio turned to a classical music station, something odd for Williamson, who only listened to country music. John Fiedler portrays Williamson's doctor. This is the only episode of any TV series that Peter Falk directed.
