= Robert Conrad =

American actor (1935–2020)

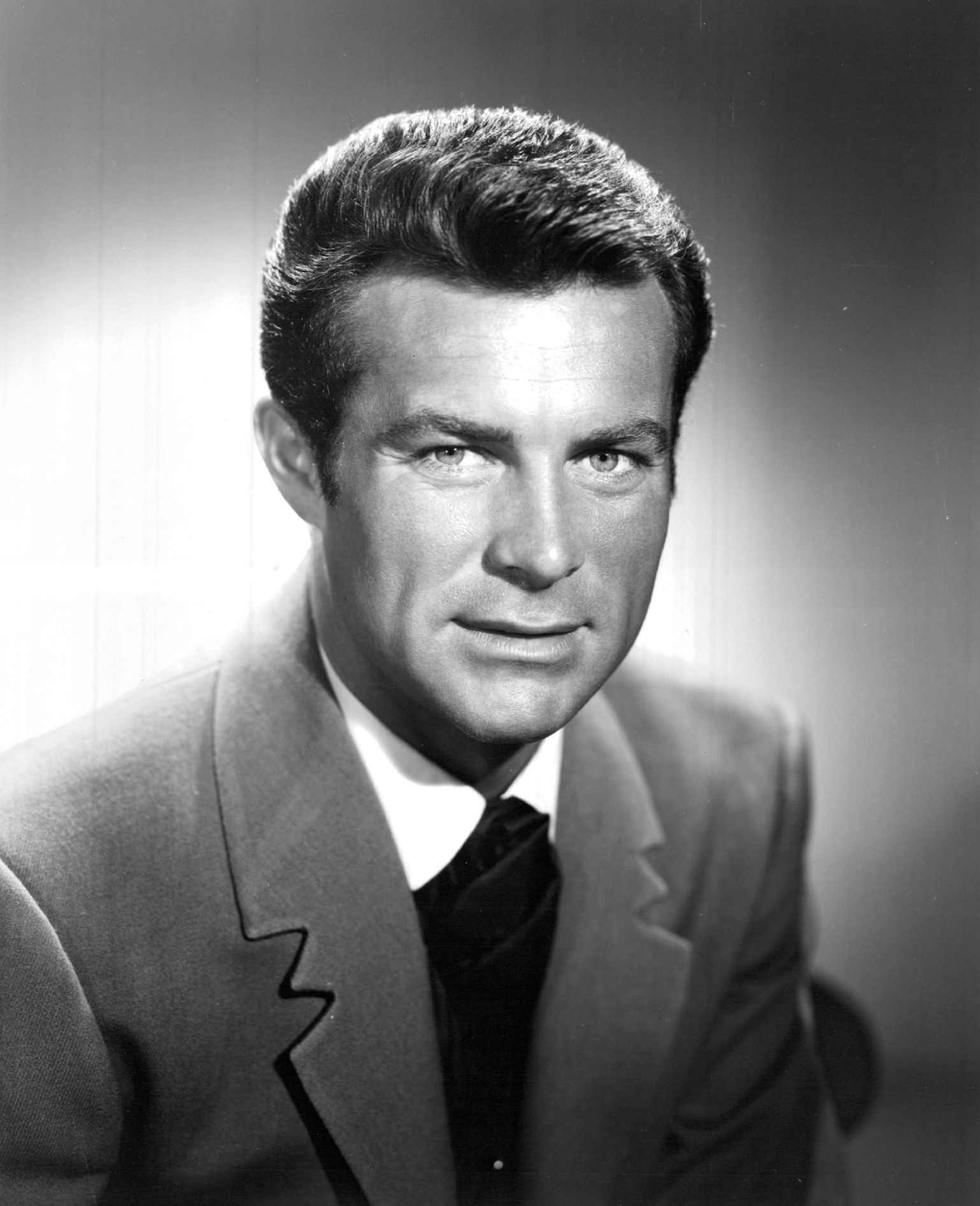
- Conrad in 1965 as James West in The Wild Wild West
- Born: Conrad Robert Falk; March 1, 1935; Chicago, Illinois, U.S.
- Died: February 8, 2020 (aged 84); Malibu, California, U.S.
- Education: Northwestern University
- Occupations: Actor; singer; stuntman
- Years active: 1953–2019
- Spouses: Joan Kenlay (m. 1952; div. 1977); LaVelda Ione Fann (m. 1983; div. 2010)
- Children: 8

Robert Conrad (born Conrad Robert Falk; March 1, 1935 – February 8, 2020) was an American actor, singer, and stuntman. He is best known for his role in the 1965–1969 television series The Wild Wild West, playing the sophisticated Secret Service agent James T. West. He also portrayed private investigator Tom Lopaka in Hawaiian Eye (1959–1963) and World War II ace Pappy Boyington in Baa Baa Black Sheep (1976–1978; later syndicated as Black Sheep Squadron).

In addition to acting, he was a singer and recorded several pop/rock songs in the late 1950s and early 1960s as Bob Conrad. He hosted a weekly two-hour national radio show (The PM Show with Robert Conrad) on CRN Digital Talk Radio beginning in 2008.

== Early life ==
Conrad was born Conrad Robert Falk in Chicago. His father, Leonard Henry Falk, was 17 years old at the time of Conrad's birth and was of Polish descent, the original family name having been Falkowski. His mother, Alice Jacqueline Hartman (daughter of Conrad and Hazel Hartman), was 15 years old when she gave birth, and named her son after her father. She became the first publicity director of Mercury Records, where she was known as Jackie Smith. She married twice, including once to Chicago radio personality Eddie Hubbard in 1948. Eddie Hubbard and Jackie Smith reportedly had a child together (born c. 1949) before splitting up in 1958.

Conrad attended Chicago schools including South Shore High School, Hyde Park High School, the YMCA Central School, and New Trier High School. He dropped out of school at age 15 to work full-time, including loading trucks for Consolidated Freightways and Eastern Freightways, and driving a milk truck for Chicago's Bowman Dairy.

After working in Chicago for several years and studying theater arts at Northwestern University, Conrad pursued an acting career. One of his first paying roles was a week-long job posing outside a Chicago theater where the film Giant (1956) was screened; Conrad bore a resemblance to the film's lead, actor James Dean, so his mother used her entertainment industry contacts to help him get the part intended as a publicity stunt to boost attendance at the theater. Conrad also studied singing; his vocal coach was Dick Marx, the father of singer Richard Marx.

== Career ==
=== Early performances ===
In 1957, Conrad met actor Nick Adams while visiting James Dean's gravesite in Fairmount, Indiana. They became friends and Adams suggested that Conrad move to California to pursue acting.

Adams got a bit part for Conrad in the film Juvenile Jungle (1958). Adams was supposed to appear in it, but withdrew so he could take a part in a different movie. Conrad's brief non-speaking role in Juvenile Jungle enabled him to join the Screen Actors Guild. He had a small role in the film Thundering Jets, also in 1958.

=== Warner Bros. ===
Conrad was soon signed to an acting contract by Warner Bros. He also sang, and released several recordings with Warner Bros. Records on a variety of LPs, EPs, and SPs 33-1/3 and 45 rpm records during the late 1950s and early 1960s. In 1961, he had a minor Billboard hit song in "Bye Bye Baby" which reached No. 113.

At Warner, he appeared in the second season of the James Garner series Maverick (episode: "Yellow River", 1959). He was featured in other shows, either for Warner or Ziv Television, including Highway Patrol, Lawman, Colt .45 (playing Billy the Kid), Sea Hunt, The Man and the Challenge, and Lock Up.

=== Hawaiian Eye ===
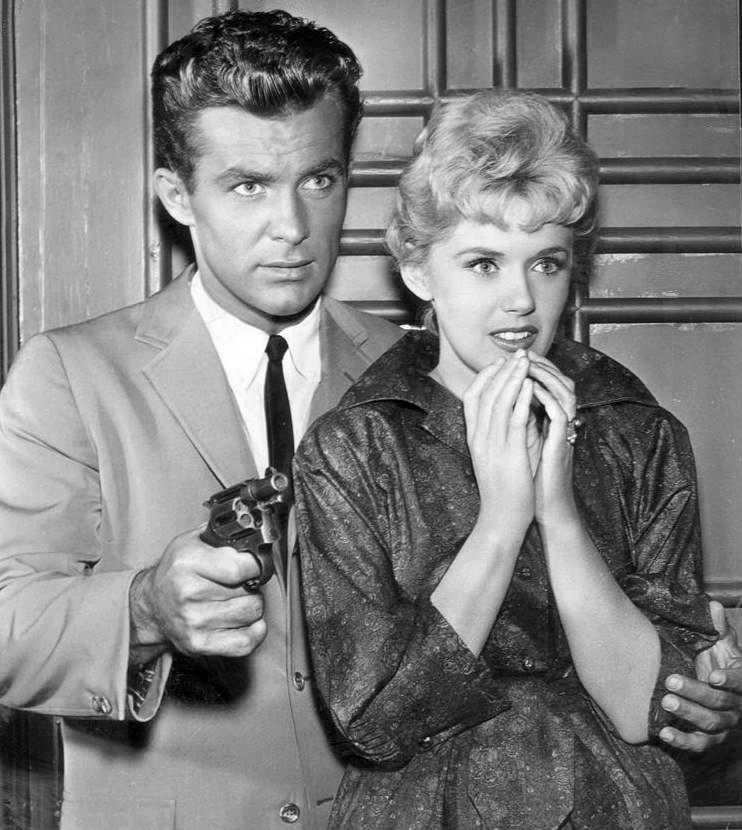
Conrad and Connie Stevens, 1960

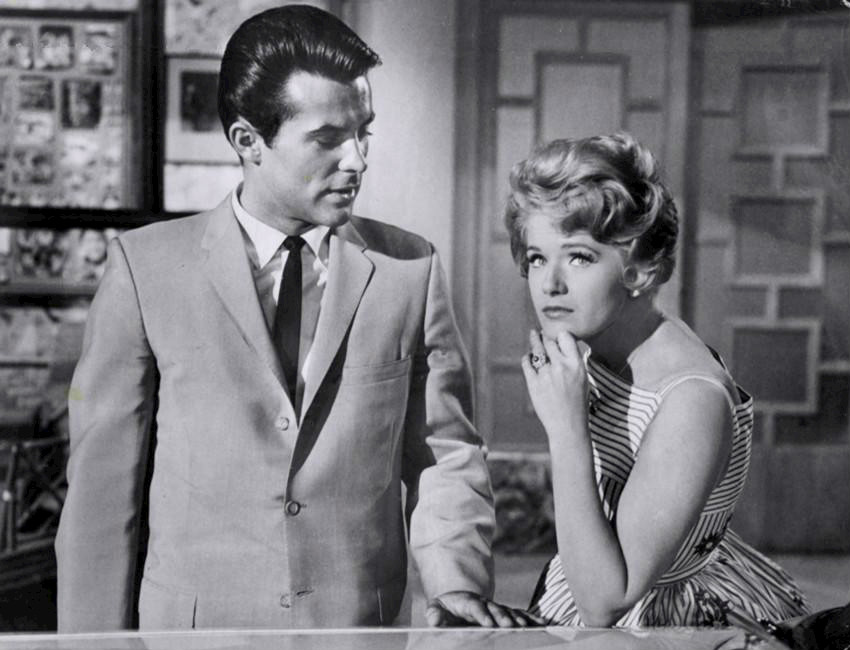
Conrad and Stevens, 1961

Warner Brothers had a big success with its detective show 77 Sunset Strip, then made Hawaiian Eye, a follow-up series. Conrad starred as detective Tom Lopaka. He was introduced on Strip, then spun off into a series that ran from 1959 to 1963, both in the U.S. and overseas. During the series' run, Conrad appeared on an episode of the Warner Brothers series The Gallant Men. After Hawaiian Eye was over, Conrad starred in Palm Springs Weekend (1963).

In Mexico, Conrad signed a recording contract with the Orfeon label. He released two albums with a few singles sung in Spanish. In 1964, he guest-starred on an episode of Temple Houston, then performed in the comedic film La Nueva Cenicienta (also known as The New Cinderella). The next year, he was in the episode "Four into Zero" of Kraft Suspense Theatre, and portrayed Pretty Boy Floyd in Young Dillinger alongside his old friend Nick Adams.

=== The Wild Wild West ===
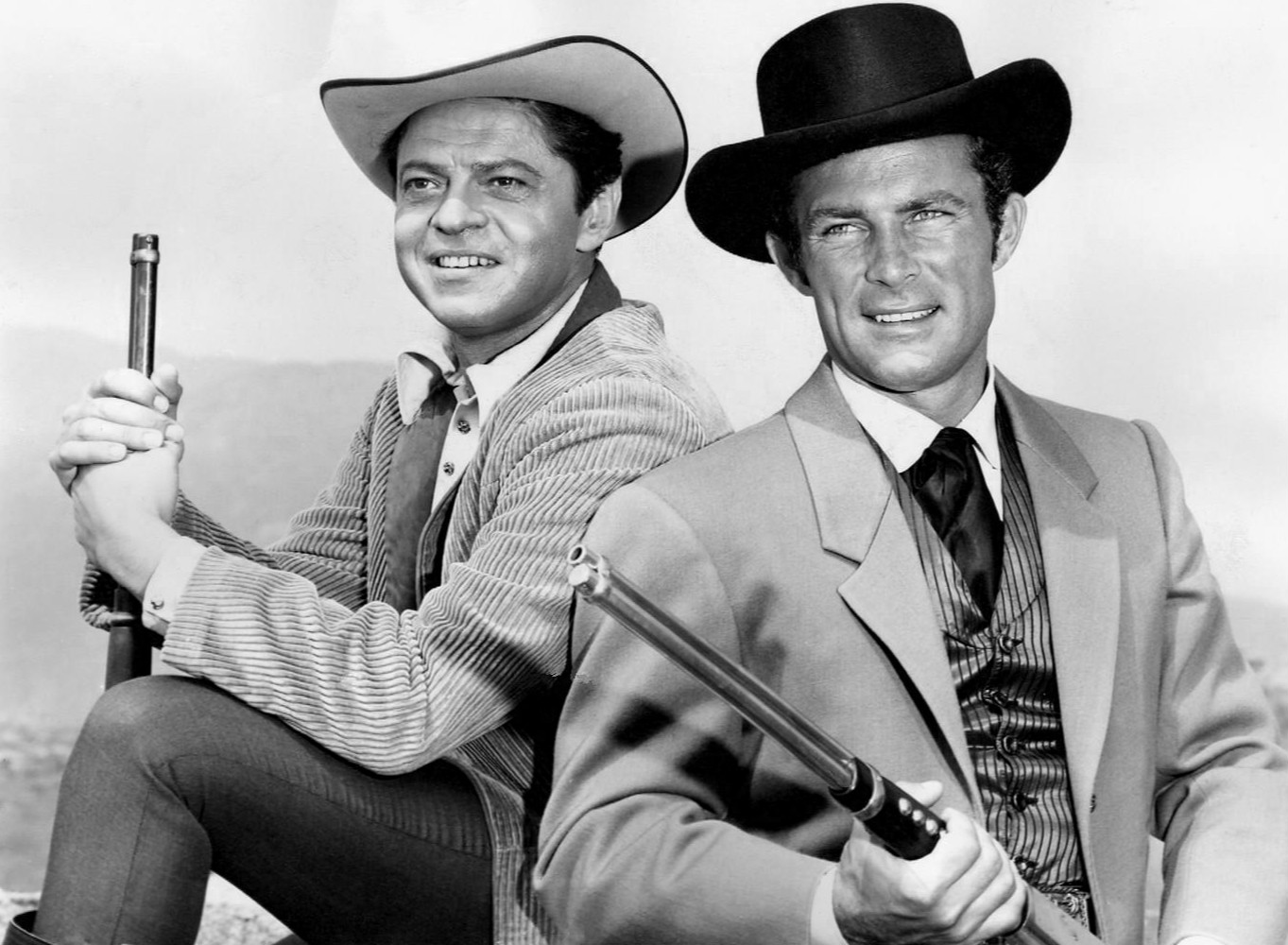
Ross Martin and Conrad, 1965

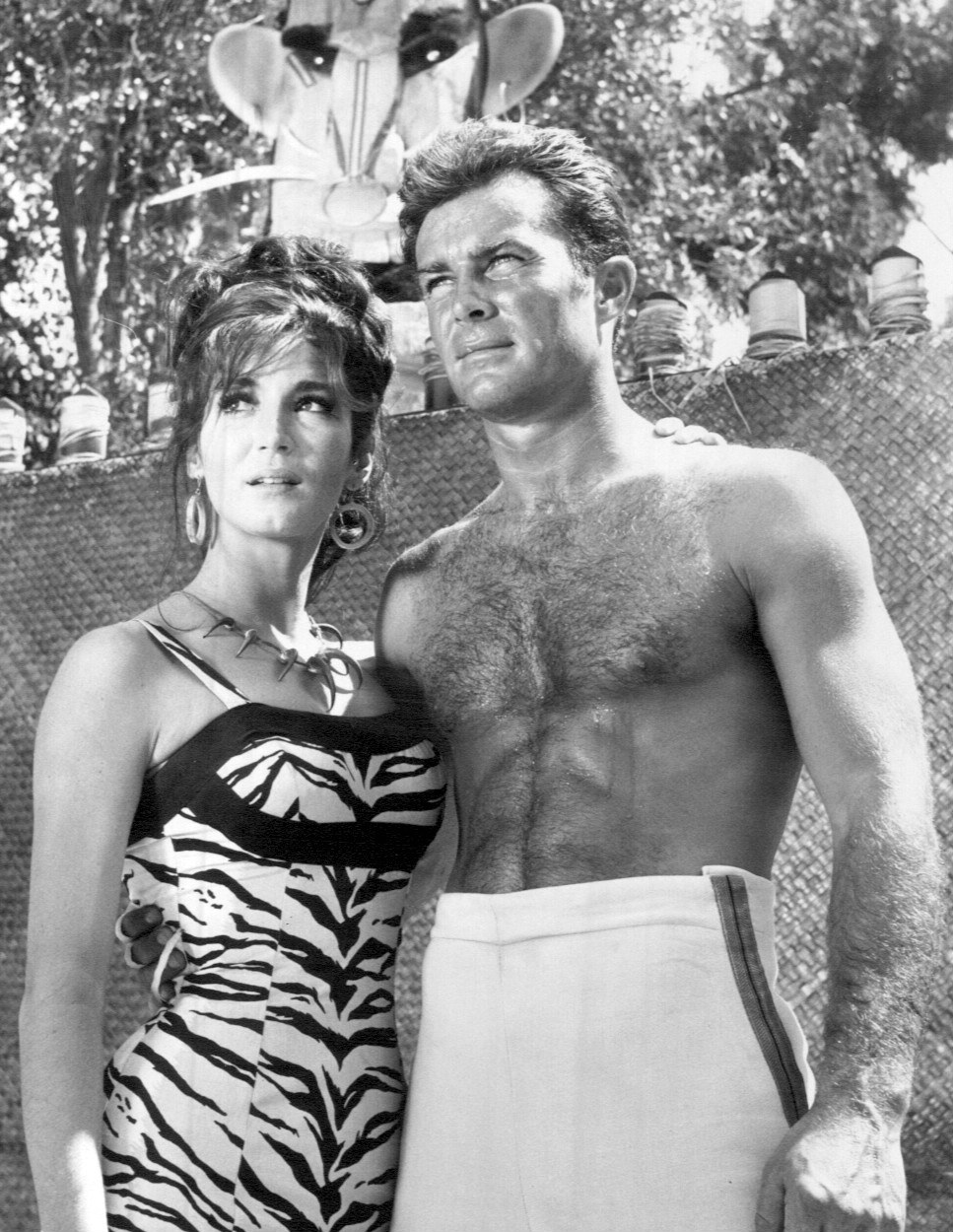
Julie Payne and Conrad in The Wild Wild West, 1966

In 1965, Conrad began his starring role as government agent James West on the weekly series The Wild Wild West, which aired on CBS until its cancellation in 1969. He made $5,000 a week. He did most of his own stunts and fight scenes during the series, and while filming the season four episode "The Night of the Fugitives", he was injured and rushed to the hospital after he dove from the top of a saloon staircase, lost his grip on a chandelier, fell 12 feet, and landed on his head.

In addition to starring in The Wild Wild West, Conrad found time to work on other projects. He went to Mexico in 1967 to appear in Ven a cantar conmigo (Come, sing with me), a musical. He also formed his own company, Robert Conrad Productions, and under its auspices he wrote, starred in, and directed the Western film The Bandits (also 1967).

=== Roles as Paul Ryan and Jake Webster ===
Conrad appeared in episodes of Mannix and Mission: Impossible. In 1969, he signed a three-picture deal with Bob Hope's Doan Productions. The first two films were slated to be Keene then No Beer in Heaven, but only the first movie was ever produced.

In 1969, he debuted as prosecutor Paul Ryan in the TV movie D.A.: Murder One (1969). He reprised the role in D.A.: Conspiracy to Kill (1971) and the short-lived 1971 series The D.A.. In 1971, he also played Deputy D.A. Paul Ryan on Adam-12 (Episode: "The Radical"), and in a compilation of several of the 1/2 hour "The D.A" episodes into a TV movie syndicated as Confessions of a D.A. Man. He was also in such made-for-television movies as Weekend of Terror (1970) and Five Desperate Women (1971). He tried another TV series as American spy Jake Webster in Assignment Vienna (1972), which lasted only eight episodes. He was a murderous fitness franchise promoter in a fourth season episode of Columbo ("An Exercise in Fatality", 1974). Conrad starred in the feature films Murph the Surf (1975) and Sudden Death (1977).

=== Baa Baa Black Sheep ===
Conrad briefly returned to series TV from 1976 to 1978 as legendary tough-guy World War II fighter ace Pappy Boyington in Baa Baa Black Sheep, retitled for its second season and in later syndication as Black Sheep Squadron in a re-tooling that failed to keep the series on the air. He directed three episodes.

Despite the show's struggles in the ratings, Conrad went on to win a People's Choice Award for Favorite Male Actor and a Golden Globe nomination for his performance.

=== Centennial ===
Conrad followed Black Sheep Squadron with a significant lead part in the lengthy television miniseries Centennial (1978), which was based on James Michener's book of the same name. Conrad played the pioneering French Canadian trapper who went by only one name, Pasquinel, and partnered with Scotsman Alexander McKeague, played by UK actor Richard Chamberlain. Their partnership in the story opening anchors the first 8 hours of the epic adventure's beginnings, with Conrad's character being regarded as the most popular of the entire series by many fans of both the show and Michener's best-selling book. The original broadcast of Centennial consisted of 12 episodes broadcast once a week, and most were about two hours long. Since Conrad’s major role is concentrated in the beginning, he had roughly 5 hours of screen time over two months of episodes, covering a period of 20 years in the storyline before his character dies and the story shifts to the next generation. Native Americans at the time also praised the accuracy of how the different tribes were portrayed when trappers befriended them and set up trade routes, long before other settlers and soldiers made any contact with the indigenous tribes of the Great Plains. Pasquinel marries an Arapaho chief's daughter "Clay Basket" and has two sons with her, while simultaneously being married to a silversmith's German daughter back in St. Louis. The theme of racial prejudice against Native Americans in that era was a prominent part of the storyline, and shapes what happens to the French trapper's "halfbreed" sons in later episodes. Conrad's experience as a Hollywood stuntman as well as a star was also evident in this role, as the French trapper was a scrappy, rugged, charming, courageous, romantic, strong and powerful mountain man, and many felt Conrad's physical fitness and manly persona exemplified that archetype, with the delivery of his signature line about why the tribes could trust him: "Because I am Pasquinel, and I come to you unafraid." Conrad expressed great pride in that role and series fans to this day feel Conrad's iconic episodes are the strongest part of the entire series, because Pasquinel & McKeag alongside Michael Ansara as the Arapaho Chief give the opening of Centennial an epic, adventurous feel that sets the tone for literally everything that follows.

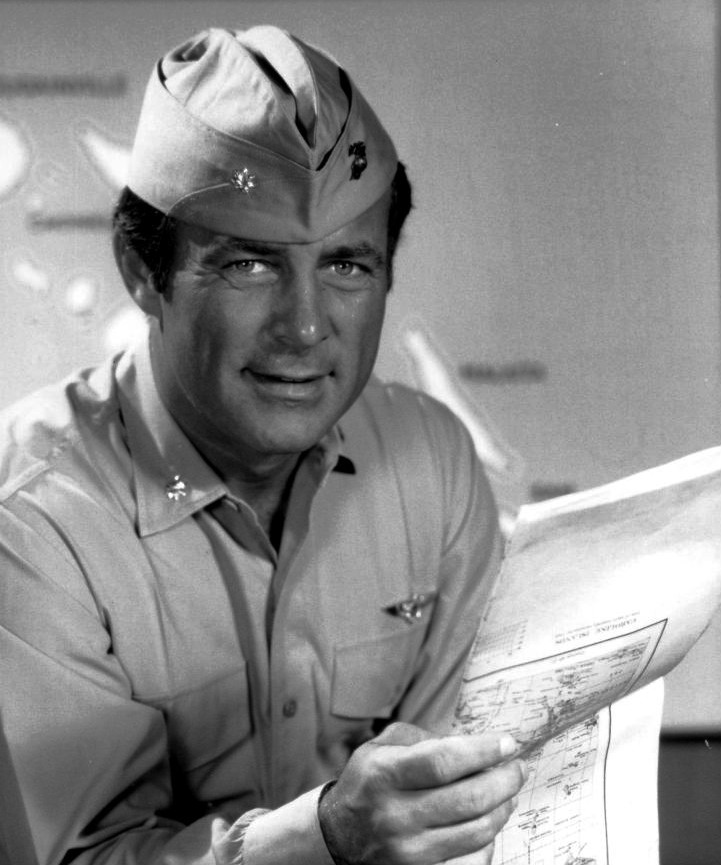
Robert Conrad as Major Gregory "Pappy" Boyington in Baa Baa Black Sheep in 1976.

=== The Duke and A Man Called Sloane ===
In 1978, Conrad starred in the short-lived TV series The Duke as Duke Ramsey, a boxer turned private eye. Conrad directed some episodes. In the late 1970s, he served as the captain of the NBC team for six editions of Battle of the Network Stars. Around this time he reprised the role of West in a pair of made-for-TV films which reunited him with his West co-star, Ross Martin, The Wild Wild West Revisited (1979) and More Wild Wild West (1980).

Conrad was identified in the late 1970s with his television commercials for Eveready batteries, particularly his placing of the battery on his shoulder and prompting the viewer to challenge its long-lasting power: "Come on, I dare ya". The commercial was parodied frequently on American television comedies such as Johnny Carson's The Tonight Show and The Carol Burnett Show.

Conrad made the occasional feature such as The Lady in Red (1979) for Roger Corman's New World Pictures, where he played John Dillinger from a script by John Sayles. Conrad later played a modern-day variation of James West in the short-lived series A Man Called Sloane in 1979. Conrad directed some episodes.

=== 1980s ===
Conrad spent most of the 1980s starring in television movies. He played a paraplegic coach in Coach of the Year (1980), and the title role in Will: G. Gordon Liddy (1982). Both were for his own company, A Shane Productions. In 1982, he also was in the Richard Brooks film Wrong is Right with Sean Connery as the main character and Conrad as General Wombat. The film had been described as a Dr. Strangelove for the 1980s.

In 1984, Conrad and his production company produced the film, Hard Knox, an unsold pilot for a proposed TV series. He played the lead role of retired U.S. Marine Colonel Joseph Knox, who returns to his childhood home of Mount Carroll, Illinois, to teach at his alma mater, a local military prep academy. The film was shot in Mount Carroll at the former Shimer College.

Conrad played a Police Chief in the theatrically released comedy film Moving Violations (1985), and appeared in the TV movies The Fifth Missile (1986), Assassin (1986) and Charley Hannah's War (1986).

In 1986, Conrad served as special guest referee for the main event of WrestleMania 2 between Hulk Hogan and King Kong Bundy in a Steel Cage Match for the WWF Championship.

In 1987, he starred as Jesse Hawkes in the short-lived TV series High Mountain Rangers with his sons Shane Conrad and Christian Conrad, about a family of wilderness rescue and law enforcement officers in Lake Tahoe. The series was canceled after 13 episodes, but was reworked for the 1989 series Jesse Hawkes, which saw Hawkes and his sons becoming bounty hunters in San Francisco. The series was canceled after 6 episodes.

=== 1990s ===
Conrad appeared in the music video for Richard Marx's "Hazard", which was a No. 1 hit in 13 countries including the United States. He had a supporting role in Jingle All the Way (1996) with Arnold Schwarzenegger. Conrad's later credits include an episode of Nash Bridges and the film Dead Above Ground (2002).

Conrad appeared in the movie Samurai Cowboy in 1994. The following year, he essentially rebooted High Mountain Rangers, reteaming with his sons Shane and Christian, and his second wife LaVelda Fann, in the TV movie pilot High Sierra Search and Rescue, which led to a short-lived TV series that was canceled after only eight episodes.

=== 2000s–2010s ===
In 2005, he ran for President of the Screen Actors Guild. In 2006, Conrad recorded audio introductions for every episode of the first season of The Wild Wild West for its North American DVD release on June 6. The DVD set also included one of Conrad's Eveready battery commercials; in his introduction, Conrad stated he was flattered to be parodied by Carson. He was inducted into the Hollywood Stuntmen's Hall of Fame for his work on The Wild Wild West series.

Beginning in 2008, he hosted a weekly two-hour national radio show (The PM Show with Robert Conrad) on CRN Digital Talk Radio. He appeared in the documentary film Pappy Boyington Field (released in July 2010 on DVD) where he recounted his personal insights about the legendary Marine Corps aviator he portrayed in the television series. His last appearance on the radio show was July 18, 2019, and Mike Garey was his co-host.

== Personal life and death ==
Conrad and his first wife Joan were married for 25 years and had five children. They divorced amicably in 1977. That same year he met his second wife LaVelda Ione Fann. He was 43 when he emceed the Miss National Teenager Pageant, which she won. Their marriage produced three children before their divorce in 2010. His two families were said to "get along famously." Conrad was joined on some television shows by his sons, Shane and Christian, and his daughter, Nancy. Another daughter, Joan, became a television producer.

In a 2008 interview, Conrad described Chicago Outfit associate and burglar Michael Spilotro as his "best friend". Spilotro's murder was featured in the movie Casino. Mob lawyer Frank Ragano, whose clientele included Jimmy Hoffa, Carlos Marcello and Santo Trafficante Jr., was both his lawyer and friend. In 1984, Conrad was awarded a star on the Walk of Western Stars in Newhall, California (now a part of Santa Clarita).

Conrad was involved with a volunteer organization in Bear Valley, California, known as Bear Valley Search and Rescue, which later formed the basis for High Mountain Rangers.

On March 31, 2003, while on Highway 4 in California's Sierra Nevada foothills near his Alpine County home, Conrad drove his Jaguar over the center median and slammed head-on into a Subaru driven by 26-year-old Kevin Burnett. Both men suffered serious injuries. As a result, Conrad faced felony charges to which he pleaded no contest. His plea was accepted, and he was convicted of drunk driving.

He was sentenced to six months of house confinement, alcohol counseling and five years' probation. A civil suit filed by Burnett against Conrad was settled the following year for an undisclosed amount. In 2005, Burnett died at age 28 from perforated ulcers; his family attributed them to his difficult recovery from the crash. Conrad suffered severe nerve injuries from the crash, leaving his right side partially paralyzed.

Conrad died of heart failure in Malibu, California, on February 8, 2020, at age 84.

== Filmography ==
=== Film ===
Year	Title	Role	Notes
1958	Juvenile Jungle	Minor Role	Uncredited
1958	Thundering Jets	Lt. Robert 'Tiger Bob' Kiley	
1959	Paratroop Command	Art	Uncredited
1962	Red Nightmare	Pete	Short film shot in 1957
1963	Palm Springs Weekend	Eric Dean	
1964	La nueva Cenicienta	Bob Conrad	
1965	Young Dillinger	'Pretty Boy' Floyd	
1967	Ven a cantar conmigo	Roberto	
1967	The Bandits	Chris Barrett	Also director and writer
1969	Keene		Credited as Bob Conrad
1975	Murph the Surf	Allan Kuhn	
1977	Sudden Death	Duke Smith	
1979	The Lady in Red	John Dillinger	
1982	Wrong Is Right	Gen. Wombat	
1985	Moving Violations	Chief Rowe	Uncredited
1994	Samurai Cowboy	Gabe McBride	
1996	Jingle All the Way	Officer Hummell	
1999	New Jersey Turnpikes		
1999	Garbage Day	Garbage Thrower	Short
2002	Dead Above Ground	Reed Wilson	Final film role

=== Television ===
Year	Title	Role	Notes
1959	Bat Masterson	Juanito	Episode: "One Bullet from Broken Bow"
1959	Maverick	Davie Barrows	Episode: "Yellow River"
1959	Sea Hunt	Hal Peters / The Boat Captain	2 episodes
1959	Highway Patrol	Tommy Chugg	Episode: "Revenge"
1959	Lawman	Davey Catterton	Episode: "Battle Scar"
1959	Colt .45	Billy the Kid	Episode: "Amnesty"
1959	The Man and the Challenge	Bill Howard	Episode: "Maximum Capacity"
1959	Lock-Up	Harry Connors	Episode: "The Harry Connors Story"
1959–1962	77 Sunset Strip	Tom Lopaka	4 episodes
1959–1963	Hawaiian Eye	Tom Lopaka	104 episodes
1962	The Gallant Men	Sgt. Griff Benedict	Episode: "And Cain Cried Out"
1964	Temple Houston	Martin Purcell	Episode: "The Town That Trespassed"
1965	Kraft Suspense Theatre	Gary Kemp	Episode: "Four into Zero"
1965–1969	The Wild Wild West	James T. West (Jim West)	104 episodes
1968–1972	Mission: Impossible	Bobby / Press Allen / Eddie Lorca	4 episodes
1969	Mannix	Mitch Cantrell	Episode: "The Playground"
1969	The D.A.: Murder One	Paul Ryan	Television film
1970	Weekend of Terror	Eddie	Television film
1971	The D.A.: Conspiracy to Kill	Deputy D.A. Paul Ryan	Television film
1971	Five Desperate Women	Michael Wylie	Television film
1971	Adam-12	Deputy D.A. Paul Ryan	Episode: "The Radical"
1971–1972	The D.A.	Deputy D.A. Paul Ryan	15 episodes
1972	Adventures of Nick Carter	Nick Carter	Television film
1972–1973	Assignment Vienna	Jake Webster	8 episodes
1974	Columbo	Milo Janus	Episode: "An Exercise in Fatality"
1975	The Last Day	Bob Dalton	Television film
1976	Smash-Up on Interstate 5	Sergeant Sam Marcum	Television film
1976–1978	Baa Baa Black Sheep	Maj. Greg 'Pappy' Boyington	36 episodes
1977	Laugh-In	Guest Performer	Episode: #1.4
1978	Confessions of the D.A. Man	Paul Ryan	Television film
1978–1979	Centennial	Pasquinel	Television miniseries
1979	The Duke	Oscar 'Duke' Ramsey	Television miniseries
1979	The Wild Wild West Revisited	Jim West	Television film
1979	Breaking Up Is Hard to Do	Frank Scapa	Television film
1979	A Man Called Sloane	Thomas R. Sloane	12 episodes
1980	More Wild Wild West	Jim West	Television film
1980	Coach of the Year	Jim Brandon	Television film
1982	Will: G. Gordon Liddy	G. Gordon Liddy	Television film
1983	Confessions of a Married Man		Television film
1984	Hard Knox	Col. Joe Knox	Television film
1985	Two Fathers' Justice	Bill Stackhouse	Television film
1986	The Fifth Missile	Cmdr. Mark Van Meer	Television film
1986	Assassin	Henry Stanton	Television film
1986	Charley Hannah	Capt. Charley Hannah	Television film
1986	One Police Plaza	Lt. Daniel B. Malone	Television film
1987	J.J. Starbuck	Corbett Cook	Episode: "A Killing in the Market"
1987–1988	High Mountain Rangers	Jesse Hawkes	13 episodes
1988	Police Story: Gladiator School	Officer Charles 'Chick' Stacy	Television film
1988	Glory Days	Mike Moran	Television film
1989	Jesse Hawkes	Jesse Hawkes	6 episodes
1990	Anything to Survive	Eddie Barton	
1992	Mario and the Mob	Mario Dante	Television film
1992	The Kennedy Assassinations: Coincidence or Conspiracy?	Host	Documentary
1993	Sworn to Vengeance	Sergeant Stewart	Television film
1994	Two Fathers: Justice for the Innocent	Stackhouse	Television film
1994	Search and Rescue	Tooter	Television film
1995	High Sierra Search and Rescue	Griffin 'Tooter' Campbell	6 episodes
1999	Just Shoot Me!	Himself	Episode: "Jack Gets Tough"
2000	Nash Bridges	CalTrans Guy	Episode: "Heist"
