= Columbo season 5 =

Season of television series

Columbo
- Season 5
- No. of episodes: 6

Release
- Original network: NBC
- Original release: September 14, 1975 – May 2, 1976

Season chronology
- ← Previous; Season 4 Next → Season 6

This is a list of episodes from the fifth season of Columbo.

== Broadcast history ==
The season originally aired Sundays at 9:00-10:30 pm (EST) as part of The NBC Sunday Mystery Movie.

== DVD release ==
The DVD was released by Universal Studios Home Entertainment.

== Episodes ==
No. overall	No. in season	Title	Directed by	Written by	Murderer played by	Victim(s) played by	Original release date	Runtime
32	1	"Forgotten Lady"	Harvey Hart	William Driskill	Janet Leigh as Grace Wheeler	Sam Jaffe as Henry Willis	September 14, 1975	93 min
When elderly physician Henry Willis (Sam Jaffe) refuses to finance a return to the spotlight for his wife, aging former movie star Grace Wheeler (Janet Leigh), she kills him in his sleep, passing it off as a suicide. Their elderly butler (Maurice Evans) believes Grace was in a private screening room the entire time, watching one of her classic films. Final clue/twist: Columbo believes that a discrepancy between the length of the movie and the time it took Grace to watch it, including the few minutes it took her to fix the film after it ripped, proves that Grace spent some time away from the screening room. It was then, Columbo concludes, that she was out committing the murder. This is one of very few episodes of Columbo in which the perpetrator is not arrested, as Ned Diamond (John Payne), Grace's longtime song and dance partner who has always loved her, falsely confesses to save her after Columbo informs him she is suffering from a degenerative brain disease (the primary reason her husband refused to finance her return as the physical strain of acting would have killed her) and likely no longer even remembers the murder. Nonetheless, Columbo is prepared to arrest her. Diamond makes his false confession to Grace who briefly becomes hysterical. Columbo arrests Diamond, both realizing that by the time he is cleared, Grace will have died. Columbo's normal instincts thwarted, he makes several half turns – as though to enter the screening room – where Grace, lost in the past, is watching the film, having already forgotten Diamond's confession. Columbo then leaves the mansion, following Diamond. The episode features excerpts from the 1953 musical comedy Walking My Baby Back Home, which starred Leigh; Columbo music composer Henry Mancini had served as the film's composer as well. It is Grace's favorite film, the one playing when she was committing the crime and the one she is watching, mesmerized, at the end of the episode. An amusing concurrent side-story concerns Columbo's penchant for not carrying his firearm and his decade-long lapse in going to the range for shooting proficiency. He has been evading Sgt. Lefkowitz (Francine York) whose computer records show the lapses. Finally, while Columbo is eating an ice cream cone with his dog, an Internal Affairs officer tells him he has 24 hours to appear at the range or his badge will be pulled. (Columbo lends his badge to a crony whom he asks to go to the range in his place, claiming he cannot pass the shooting proficiency test.)
33	2	"A Case of Immunity"	Ted Post	Story by : James Menzies; Teleplay by : Lou Shaw	Héctor Elizondo as Hassan Salah and Sal Mineo as Rachman Habib	André Lawrence as Youseff Alafa and Sal Mineo as Rachman Habib	October 12, 1975	70 min
Hassan Salah (Héctor Elizondo), chief diplomat of the Legation of Suari, an Arab nation with a new young king, has a scheme for shifting power within his government. He enlists Rachman Habib (Sal Mineo), a naïve idealist in the Legation, to help him stage the murder of a security officer named Youssef Alafa, then plants evidence to make it look like the work of radicals. Salah pins the murder on the now-absent Habib, who, as part of the plan, has gone into hiding. Salah later kills Habib as well. Columbo unravels the truth, but finds himself stymied by Salah's diplomatic immunity. Columbo then meets the new king, who is on a diplomatic visit to the United States, and is liked by the young monarch. Final clue/twist: Columbo gets Salah, still under diplomatic immunity, to confess to the murder with the king listening in from the next room. To stay in the U.S. rather than be sent back to Suari and the torture that it is implied he would face, Salah signs a confession and waives his immunity from prosecution.
34	3	"Identity Crisis"	Patrick McGoohan	William Driskill	Patrick McGoohan as Nelson Brenner	Leslie Nielsen as A.J. "Geronimo" Henderson	November 2, 1975	93 min
A CIA operative code-named "Geronimo" (Leslie Nielsen) contacts a fellow CIA-operative Nelson Brenner (Patrick McGoohan, who also directed the episode), now working undercover as speech-writing consultant, to demand his share of money from a previous operation they were involved in. The go-between is Lawrence Melville (Otis Young). It motivates Brenner to kill Geronimo. Columbo finds himself blocked at every turn by a man who knows a lot of private and classified secrets, and even by a visit from the Director of the Agency (David White). Final clue/twist: Brenner's alibi, a taped speech for a client, is proven false when Columbo establishes that parts of the speech referred to news that was not known until hours after the recording was allegedly made. The episode features another French car, the Citroën SM. An inside joke is that the Director's name is Phil Corrigan (aka Secret Agent X-9). In a nod to McGoohan's role on The Prisoner, his character repeatedly uses the phrase "Be seeing you" in the episode. During the party at Brenner's home, an arrangement of the song "Once Upon a Summertime" by Michel Legrand can be heard.
35	4	"A Matter of Honor"	Ted Post	Brad Radnitz	Ricardo Montalbán as Luis Montoya	Robert Carricart as Hector Rangel	February 1, 1976	70 min
Retired and renowned matador Luis Montoya (Ricardo Montalbán) is a Mexican national hero. His trusted bookkeeper, Hector Rangel (Robert Carricart)'s son Curro is also a bullfighter. When Curro (A Martinez) is gored in the bullring, Montoya freezes up in fear and does not challenge the bull. He later decides to kill Hector, who knows what happened. Montoya lures Hector to the ring, where he shoots him with a tranquilizer gun, and unleashes the bull on him, making it appear that Hector tried to take revenge on the bull that gored his son. Columbo, who just happens to be in Tijuana for the weekend, is recognized by a suspicious local chief of police (Pedro Armendáriz Jr.), who enlists Columbo's help. Final clue/twist: Due to the condition of the muleta used to attract the bull, Columbo deduces the time frame of the murder, a period for which Montoya has no alibi. To prove Montoya's motive, Columbo persuades Curro to lure Montoya into the ring. The bull is then released, and the ex-matador again becomes paralyzed with fear, this time in front of witnesses. This episode is noteworthy as the murderer's motive is not revealed until the very end. Montoya watches a film of himself as a matador, which uses footage from the 1947 movie Fiesta, in which Montalbán plays a matador. Famous Mexican actor/director Emilio Fernández has a bit part.
36	5	"Now You See Him..."	Harvey Hart	Michael Sloan	Jack Cassidy as Stefan Mueller	Nehemiah Persoff as Jesse Jerome	February 29, 1976	85 min
The Great Santini (Jack Cassidy) is a magician extraordinaire at a cabaret. He is also being blackmailed by his insatiably greedy employer, impresario Jesse Jerome (Nehemiah Persoff), who knows Santini's past as a Nazi SS prison guard. Santini tires of the arrangement and Jerome's demand for more money, and kills his blackmailer while his famed water tank escape act, gives him an airtight alibi. He sneaks out of a room where he hides during the act, makes his way dressed as a waiter through the cabaret's kitchen and up to Jerome's office, shoots him, then returns to his act with nobody noticing. Robert Loggia plays Harry Blandford, the club's maître d'hôtel and Jerome's business partner. Final clue/twist: Santini is undone by the used carbon ribbon on Jerome's IBM Selectric typewriter. The carbon ribbon has a clear imprint of everything written with it, so it is in effect a copy of the letter Jerome was typing to send to federal authorities, which revealed the motive for the murder. At his arrest Santini remarks that he thought he had created the perfect murder; Columbo remarks that a "perfect murder" is only an illusion. This was Cassidy's third and final Columbo episode (he died in a fire later that year). In all three he played the killer. This episode also sees the return of Bob Dishy as Detective Sergeant Wilson, although unlike his previous appearance in The Greenhouse Jungle, his name is John.
37	6	"Last Salute to the Commodore"	Patrick McGoohan	Jackson Gillis	Fred Draper as Swanny Swanson	John Dehner as Otis Swanson and Robert Vaughn as Charles Clay	May 2, 1976	91 min
Commodore Otis Swanson (John Dehner) is a retired naval officer who owns a shipbuilding company, and is not happy with the shady dealings of his son-in-law Charles Clay (Robert Vaughn), who has turned the modest and upstanding business into a name-brand production line for status-seekers. Nor is he pleased with any of the people closest to him - his alcoholic daughter Joanna Clay (Diane Baker), his middle-aged playboy nephew Swanny Swanson (Fred Draper), his lawyer Jonathan Kittering (Wilfrid Hyde-White), and his shipyard manager Wayne Taylor (Joshua Bryant). He announces at his birthday party his intention to sell the company. That night, someone murders the Commodore. Although we don't see the murder on-screen, Clay is seen covering up the death by taking the Commodore's body out on his yacht at night and throwing it overboard. Columbo investigates with the help of a veteran sergeant and a 29-year-old rookie. The detective's conviction that Clay committed the crime proves premature and inaccurate, an unusual development for Columbo. Clay himself turns up dead and Columbo realizes that someone else is responsible for both murders. Final clue/twist: When Columbo holds what he says is Commodore Swanson's pocket watch to every suspect's ear, only Swanny disputes it, saying "'Tisn't" when he hears it ticking. The watch was broken at the time of the murder to create a false time frame, and only the murderer would have known the watch no longer works. (Clay's motive for covering up the murder is because he thought the killer was his wife due to planted evidence by Swanny; he was killed when he realized who the real killer was.) This episode departs from the usual Columbo format in several ways. First, the man implied to be the killer is not, and thus the episode becomes a true whodunit, with the actual murderer revealed at the end. Second, neither of the two murders is shown. Third, Columbo's personality is atypically agitated, impatient and less superficially amiable than in most other episodes. Fourth, rather than working alone, Columbo works closely alongside two other police officers (played by Bruce Kirby and Dennis Dugan), who at times interrogate suspects. Finally, the episode departs from the usual style in presenting a far greater emphasis on comedy, including some minor slapstick elements, and features a less dramatic tone.
