= 18th Tony Awards =

1964 US theatrical awards ceremony

- Date: May 24, 1964
- Location: New York Hilton; New York City, New York
- Hosted by: Sidney Blackmer
- Most wins: Hello, Dolly! (10)
- Most nominations: Hello, Dolly! (11)

Television/radio coverage
- Network: WWOR-TV

The 18th Annual Tony Awards took place on May 24, 1964, in the New York Hilton in New York City. The ceremony was broadcast on local television station WWOR-TV (Channel 9) in New York City. The host was Sidney Blackmer and the Masters of Ceremonies were Steve Lawrence and Robert Preston.

== Eligibility ==
Shows that opened on Broadway during the 1963–1964 season before April 25, 1964 are eligible.

Original plays

- Abraham Cochrane
- The Advocate
- After the Fall
- Any Wednesday
- Arturo Ui
- Baby Want a Kiss
- The Ballad of the Sad Café
- Barefoot in the Park
- Bicycle Ride to Nevada
- Blues for Mister Charlie
- But For Whom Charlie
- A Case of Libel
- Children from Their Games
- Children of the Shadows
- The Chinese Prime Minister
- Chips with Everything
- The Deputy
- Double Dublin
- The Dybbuk
- Dylan
- Each Had Six Wings
- Fair Game for Lovers
- The Golden Age
- Have I Got a Girl for You!
- The Irregular Verb to Love
- Love and Kisses
- Luther
- Man and Boy
- Marathon '33
- A Murderer Among Us
- Never Live Over a Pretzel Factory
- Nobody Loves an Albatross
- Oh Dad, Poor Dad, Mamma's Hung You in the Closet and I'm Feelin' So Sad
- Once for the Asking
- One Flew Over the Cuckoo's Nest
- The Passion of Josef D.
- The Private Ear
- The Public Eye
- A Rainy Day in Newark
- Rattle of a Simple Man
- The Rehearsal
- Semi-Detached
- Sponono
- Tambourines to Glory

Original musicals

- Anyone Can Whistle
- The Beast in Me
- Cafe Crown
- Foxy
- Funny Girl
- The Girl Who Came to Supper
- Hello, Dolly!
- Here's Love
- High Spirits
- Hot Spot
- Jennie
- Josephine Baker
- Man in the Moon
- 110 in the Shade
- Rugantino
- She Loves Me
- Sophie
- Spoon River Anthology
- The Student Gypsy
- What Makes Sammy Run?

Play revivals

- The Ages of Man
- Bérénice
- The Crucible
- Hamlet
- Marco Millions
- The Milk Train Doesn't Stop Here Anymore
- Pajama Tops
- Phèdre
- The Seagull

Musical revivals

- Pal Joey
- West Side Story

== The ceremony ==
Presenters: George Abbott, Lauren Bacall, Anne Bancroft, Harry Belafonte, Constance Bennett, Georgia Brown, David Burns, Richard Burton, Mindy Carson, Peggy Cass, Barbara Cook, Sammy Davis Jr., Paul Ford, Robert Goulet, Arthur Hill, Robert Horton, Shirley Knight, Carol Lawrence, Hal March, Mercedes McCambridge, Roddy McDowall, Molly Picon, Lee Remick, Cyril Ritchard, Paul Scofield, Martha Scott, Zachary Scott, Rip Torn, Gwen Verdon.

Music was by Meyer Davis and his Orchestra.

== Winners and nominees ==
Winners are in bold

| Best Play | Best Musical |
|---|---|
| **Luther – John Osborne**; The Ballad of the Sad Café – Edward Albee; Barefoot in the Park – Neil Simon; Dylan – Sidney Michaels | **Hello, Dolly!**; Funny Girl; High Spirits; She Loves Me |
| Best Producer (Dramatic) | Best Producer (Musical) |
| **Herman Shumlin – The Deputy**; Lewis M. Allen and Ben Edwards – The Ballad of the Sad Café; George W. George and Frank Granat – Dylan; Saint Subber – Barefoot in the Park | **David Merrick – Hello, Dolly!**; City Center Light Opera Company – West Side Story; Harold Prince – She Loves Me; Ray Stark – Funny Girl |
| Best Book (Musical) | Best Original Score (Music and/or Lyrics) Written for the Theatre |
| **Michael Stewart – Hello, Dolly!**; Noël Coward and Harry Kurnitz – The Girl Who Came to Supper; Joe Masteroff – She Loves Me; Hugh Martin and Timothy Gray – High Spirits | **Hello, Dolly! – Jerry Herman (music and lyrics)**; High Spirits – Hugh Martin and Timothy Gray (music and lyrics); 110 in the Shade – Harvey Schmidt (music) and Tom Jones (lyrics); Funny Girl – Jule Styne (music) and Bob Merrill (lyrics) |
| Best Performance by a Leading Actor in a Play | Best Performance by a Leading Actress in a Play |
| **Alec Guinness – Dylan as Dylan Thomas**; Richard Burton – Hamlet as Hamlet; Albert Finney – Luther as Martin; Jason Robards, Jr. – After the Fall as Quentin | **Sandy Dennis – Any Wednesday as Ellen Gordon**; Elizabeth Ashley – Barefoot in the Park as Corie Bratter; Colleen Dewhurst – The Ballad of the Sad Café as Amelia Evans; Julie Harris – Marathon '33 as June Havoc |
| Best Performance by a Leading Actor in a Musical | Best Performance by a Leading Actress in a Musical |
| **Bert Lahr – Foxy as Foxy**; Sydney Chaplin – Funny Girl as Nick Arnstein; Bob Fosse – Pal Joey as Joey Evans; Steve Lawrence – What Makes Sammy Run? as Sammy Glick | **Carol Channing – Hello, Dolly! as Dolly Gallagher Levi**; Beatrice Lillie – High Spirits as Madame Arcati; Barbra Streisand – Funny Girl as Fanny Brice; Inga Swenson – 110 in the Shade as Lizzie Curry |
| Best Performance by a Supporting or Featured Actor in a Play | Best Performance by a Supporting or Featured Actress in a Play |
| **Hume Cronyn – Hamlet as Polonius**; Lee Allen – Marathon '33 as Patsy; Michael Dunn – The Ballad of the Sad Café as Cousin Lyman; Larry Gates – A Case of Libel as Boyd Bendix | **Barbara Loden – After the Fall as Maggie**; Rosemary Murphy – Any Wednesday as Dorothy Cleves; Kate Reid – Dylan as Caitlin Thomas; Diana Sands – Blues for Mister Charlie as Juanita |
| Best Performance by a Supporting or Featured Actor in a Musical | Best Performance by a Supporting or Featured Actress in a Musical |
| **Jack Cassidy – She Loves Me as Stephen Kodaly**; Will Geer – 110 in the Shade as H. C. Curry; Danny Meehan – Funny Girl as Eddie Ryan; Charles Nelson Reilly – Hello, Dolly! as Cornelius Hackl | **Tessie O'Shea – The Girl Who Came to Supper as Ada Cockle**; Julienne Marie – Foxy as Celia; Kay Medford – Funny Girl as Rose Brice; Louise Troy – High Spirits as Ruth Condomine |
| Best Direction of a Play | Best Direction of a Musical |
| **Mike Nichols – Barefoot in the Park**; June Havoc – Marathon '33; Alan Schneider – The Ballad of the Sad Café; Herman Shumlin – The Deputy | **Gower Champion – Hello, Dolly!**; Joseph Anthony – 110 in the Shade; Noël Coward – High Spirits; Harold Prince – She Loves Me |
| Best Choreography | Best Conductor and Musical Director |
| **Gower Champion – Hello, Dolly!**; Danny Daniels – High Spirits; Carol Haney – Funny Girl; Herbert Ross – Anyone Can Whistle | **Shepard Coleman – Hello, Dolly!**; Lehman Engel – What Makes Sammy Run?; Charles Jaffe – West Side Story; Fred Werner – High Spirits |
| Best Scenic Design | Best Costume Design |
| **Oliver Smith – Hello, Dolly!**; Raoul Pene Du Bois – The Student Gypsy; Ben Edwards – The Ballad of the Sad Café; David Hays – Marco Millions | **Freddy Wittop – Hello, Dolly!**; Irene Sharaff – The Girl Who Came to Supper; Beni Montresor – Marco Millions; Rouben Ter-Arutunian – Arturo Ui |

== Special award ==
- Eva Le Gallienne, celebrating her 50th year as an actress, honored for her work with the National Repertory Theatre.

=== Multiple nominations and awards ===
These productions had multiple nominations:

- 11 nominations: Hello, Dolly!
- 8 nominations: Funny Girl and High Spirits
- 6 nominations: The Ballad of the Sad Café
- 5 nominations: She Loves Me
- 4 nominations: Barefoot in the Park, Dylan and 110 in the Shade
- 3 nominations: The Girl Who Came to Supper and Marathon '33
- 2 nominations: After the Fall, Any Wednesday, The Deputy, Foxy, Hamlet, Luther, Marco Millions, West Side Story and What Makes Sammy Run?

The following productions received multiple awards.

- 10 wins: Hello, Dolly!

== See also ==
- 36th Academy Awards
