= The Wild Wild West =

American western television series (1965–1969)

- Title card from the first act of the episode "The Night of the Poisonous Posey"
- Genre: Western; Spy; Adventure; Science fiction
- Created by: Michael Garrison
- Starring: Robert Conrad; Ross Martin
- Country of origin: United States
- Original language: English
- No. of seasons: 4
- No. of episodes: 104 (list of episodes)

Production
- Running time: 49–50 min.
- Production companies: Michael Garrison Productions; CBS Productions

Original release
- Network: CBS
- Release: September 17, 1965 – April 11, 1969

Related
- Wild Wild West

The Wild Wild West is an American Western, spy, and science fiction television series that ran on the CBS television network for four seasons from September 17, 1965, to April 11, 1969. Two satirical comedy television film sequels were made with the original stars in 1979 and 1980 and the series was adapted for a theatrical film in 1999.

Developed at a time when the television Western was losing ground to the spy genre, this show was conceived by its creator, Michael Garrison, as "James Bond on horseback." Set during the administration of President Ulysses S. Grant (1869–1877), the series followed Secret Service agents James West (Robert Conrad) and Artemus Gordon (Ross Martin) as they foiled the plans of megalomaniacal villains to take over part or all of the United States, protected the President, and solved crimes. The show featured a number of fantasy elements, such as the technologically advanced devices used by the agents and their adversaries. The combination of the Victorian era time-frame and the use of Vernean technology has led several steampunk web sites to cite the show as a pioneering influence on the genre. This aspect was accentuated even more in the 1999 film adaptation.

Despite high ratings, the series was cancelled near the end of its fourth season as a concession to Congress over television violence.

== Concept ==
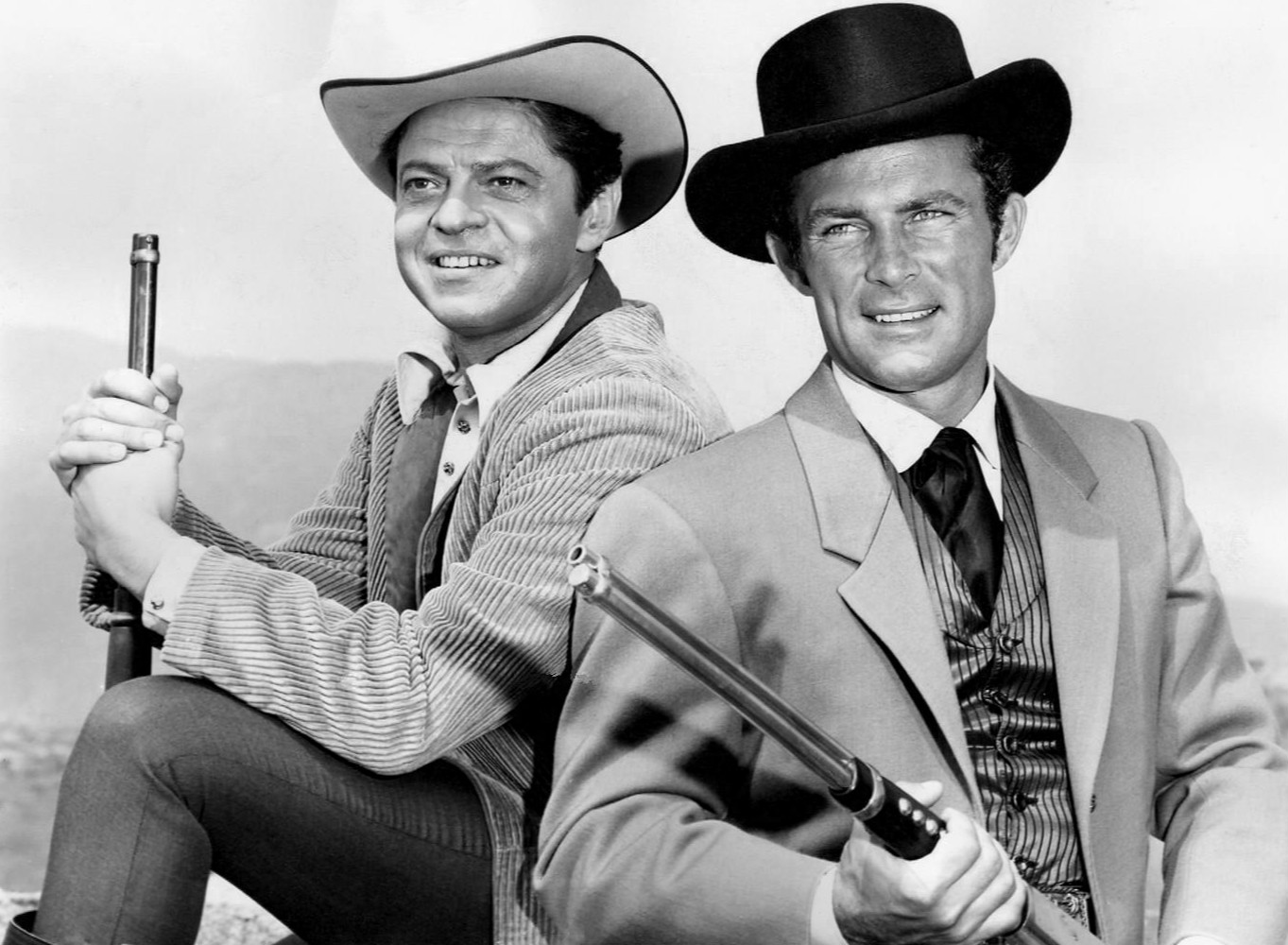
Ross Martin and Robert Conrad

The Wild Wild West told the story of two Secret Service agents: the fearless and handsome James West (played by Robert Conrad), and Artemus Gordon (played by Ross Martin), a brilliant gadgeteer and master of disguise. Their mission was to protect President Ulysses S. Grant and the United States from all manner of dangerous threats. The agents traveled in luxury aboard their own train, the Wanderer, equipped with everything from a stable car to a laboratory. James West had served as an intelligence and cavalry officer in the American Civil War (1861–1865) on Grant's staff; his "cover", at least in the pilot episode, is that of "a dandy, a high-roller from the East". Thereafter, however, there is no pretense, and his reputation as the foremost Secret Service agent often precedes him. According to the later TV movies, West retires from the Service by 1880 and lives on a ranch in Mexico. When he retires, Gordon, who was a captain in the Civil War, returns to show business as the head of a troupe of traveling Shakespeare players.

The show incorporated classic Western elements with an espionage thriller, science fiction/alternate history ideas (in a vein similar to what would later be called steampunk), in one case horror ("The Night of the Man Eating House") and humor. Episodes were also inspired by Edgar Allan Poe, H. G. Wells and Jules Verne. In the tradition of James Bond, there were always beautiful women, clever gadgets and delusional arch-enemies with half-insane plots to take over the country or the world.

The title of each episode begins with "The Night" (except for "Night of the Casual Killer" in the first season). This followed other idiosyncratic naming conventions established by shows such as Wagon Train (1957–1965), where nearly every episode was titled "The (Name) Story" or "The Story of (Name)"; Rawhide (1959–1965), in which a majority of episode titles began with "Incident"; and The Man from U.N.C.L.E. (1964–1968), whose episodes were titled "The (Blank) Affair".

== Episodes ==
Season	Episodes	Originally released	
Season	Episodes	First released	Last released
1	28	September 17, 1965	April 22, 1966
2	28	September 16, 1966	April 7, 1967
3	24	September 8, 1967	February 23, 1968
4	24	September 27, 1968	April 11, 1969
Television movies		May 9, 1979	October 8, 1980

== Characters ==
=== Villains ===
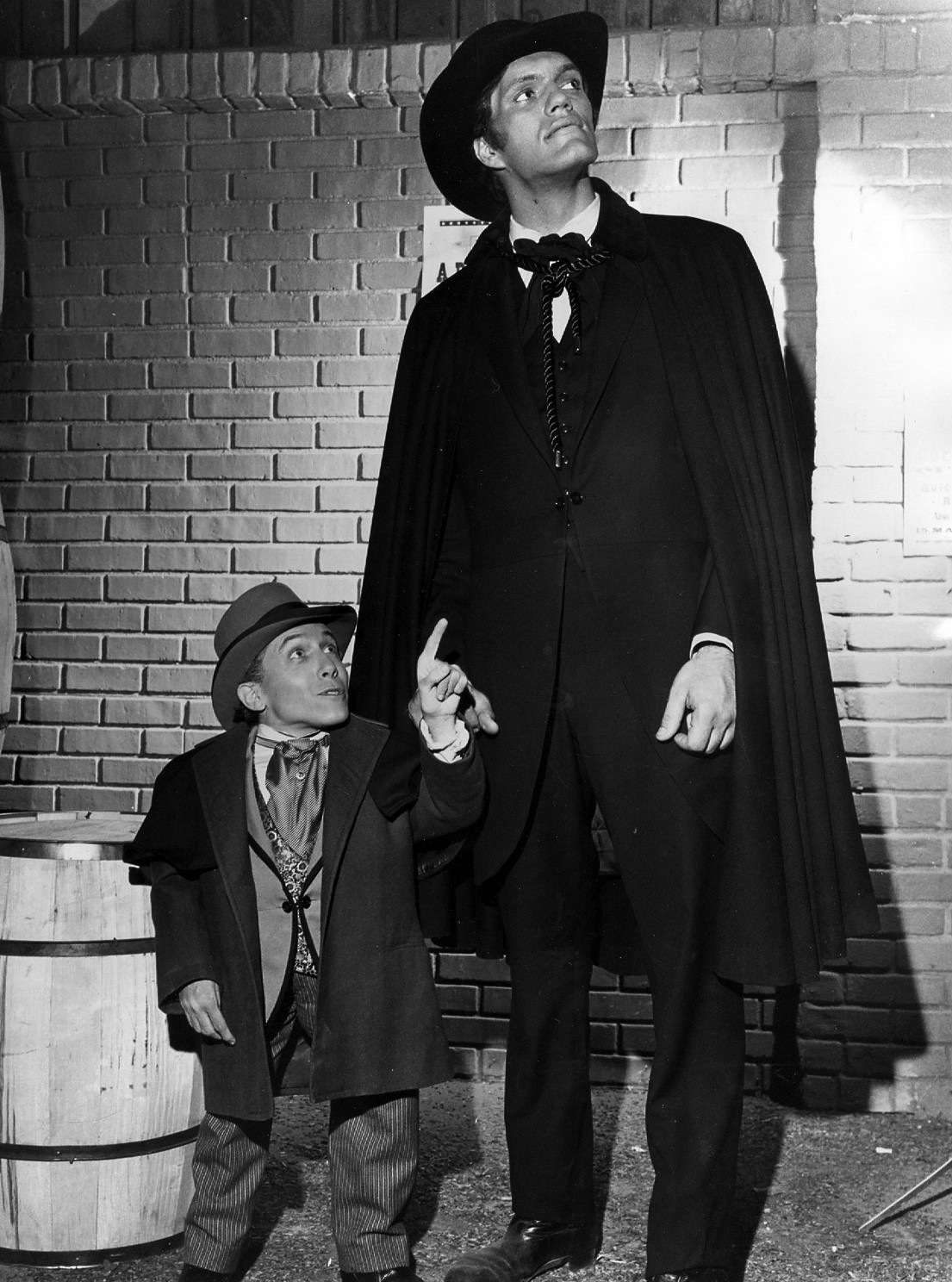
Doctor Loveless and Voltaire

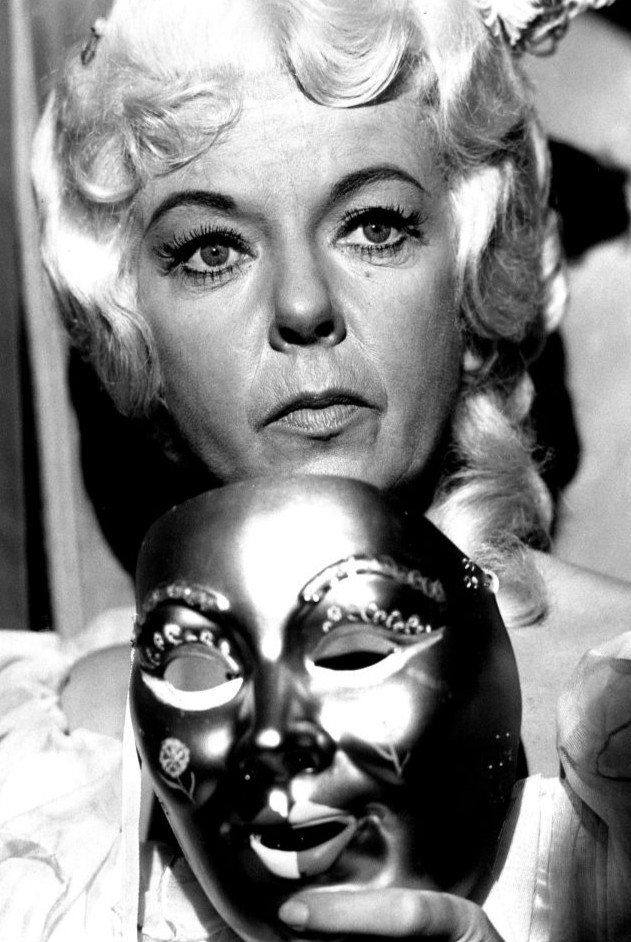
Ida Lupino as Doctor Faustina

The show's most memorable recurring arch-villain was Dr. Miguelito Quixote Loveless, a brilliant but petulant and megalomaniacal dwarf portrayed by Michael Dunn. Initially he had two companions: the towering 7-foot-2-inch (2.18 m) Voltaire, played by Richard Kiel; and the beautiful Antoinette, played by Dunn's real-life singing partner, Phoebe Dorin. Voltaire disappeared without explanation after his third episode, but Kiel returned in a different role in "The Night of the Simian Terror". Antoinette vanished after her sixth episode due to demands by Dunn's jealous real-life wife.

According to the television film The Wild Wild West Revisited, Loveless eventually dies in 1880 from ulcers, brought on by the frustration of having his plans consistently foiled by West and Gordon. (His son, played by Paul Williams in the TV film, subsequently seeks revenge on the agents.)

Although several actors appeared in different villainous roles, only one other character had a second encounter with West and Gordon: Count Manzeppi, played flamboyantly by Victor Buono. Manzeppi was a diabolical genius of "black magic" and crime, who—like Dr. Loveless—had an escape plan at the end. Buono played a different villain in the pilot episode, and also returned in More Wild Wild West as "Dr. Henry Messenger", a parody of Henry Kissinger.

Agnes Moorehead won an Emmy for her role as Emma Valentine in "The Night of the Vicious Valentine". Other villains were portrayed by Ed Asner, Yvonne Craig, Robert Duvall, Anthony Eisley, Boris Karloff, Harvey Korman, Martin Landau, Delphi Lawrence, Bethel Leslie, Robert Loggia, Ida Lupino, Burgess Meredith, Ricardo Montalbán, Leslie Nielsen, Ramon Novarro, Carroll O'Connor, Susan Oliver, Nehemiah Persoff, Percy Rodrigues, Mike Road, Jo Van Fleet, Sam Wanamaker, John Williams, William Windom, Nick Adams and H. M. Wynant.

While the show's writers created their fair share of villains, they often started with the nefarious, stylized and sometimes anachronistic inventions of these madmen (or madwomen) and then wrote the episodes around the devices. Henry Sharp, the series' story consultant, would sketch the preliminaries of the designs (eccentrically numbering every sketch "fig. 37"), and give the sketch to a writer, who would build a story around it.

=== Recurring characters ===
- Dr. Miguelito Quixote Loveless (Michael Dunn), ten episodes. The agents' nemesis.
- Colonel Richmond (Douglas Henderson), ten episodes. West and Gordon's control officer in the Secret Service.
- President Ulysses S. Grant (James Gregory in the pilot; Roy Engel thereafter), seven episodes.
- Antoinette (Phoebe Dorin), six appearances. Loveless' female companion, often seen playing a piano or string instrument and singing duet with Loveless. Dorin and Dunn (Loveless) had a real-life nightclub act, "Michael Dunn and Phoebe", in which they sang and exchanged banter. According to Dorin, while filming the episode "The Night of the Murderous Spring", her costume became entangled in the machinery used to pull the boat she and Dunn were in underwater. Dunn did not hesitate to follow her down and help her escape.
- Jeremy Pike (Charles Aidman), four episodes. One of several agents paired with Jim during Artemus' absence in the fourth season. Appears in the final Loveless episode, "The Night of Miguelito's Revenge".
- Tennyson (Charles Davis), three episodes. West's butler/valet. Seen randomly in the first season because the episodes were not always broadcast in production order.
- Voltaire (Richard Kiel), three episodes. Loveless' mostly silent, giant bodyguard. (Kiel also played Dimos Buckley in "The Night of the Simian Terror".)
- Count Carlos Mario Vincenzo Robespierre Manzeppi (Victor Buono), two appearances. A master of dark magic and leader of a handpicked teams of assassins. (Buono also played Juan Manolo in the pilot episode, "The Night of the Inferno", and Henry Messenger in More Wild Wild West, the final production.)
- Frank Harper (William Schallert): Another agent paired with Jim in the fourth season. He appears in the series' only two-part episode, "The Night of the Winged Terror". (Schallert played different characters in two other episodes.)

== Production ==
=== Casting and lead actors ===
Before The Wild Wild West, Robert Conrad played private detective Tom Lopaka in ABC's Hawaiian Eye for four seasons (1959–63). In November 1964, he was making the film Young Dillinger (1965) with Nick Adams, Victor Buono and John Ashley (all of whom would later guest star on The Wild Wild West) when his agent sent him to CBS to audition for the West role. Conrad claimed to be the 17th actor to test for the part. Others tested included Robert Horton, Ray Danton and James "Skip" Ward. Conrad also claimed that John Derek left the audition without testing.

Conrad performed nearly all of his own stunts in the series. "For the first few episodes we tried stuntmen," Conrad explained, "but the setup time slowed production down, so I volunteered. Things started moving quicker when I took the jumps and the spills. We started meeting the budget." Early on, he was doubled by Louie Elias or Chuck O'Brien.

On January 24, 1968, however, during filming of "The Night of the Fugitives" near the end of the third season, Conrad fell from a chandelier onto the stage floor and suffered a concussion. "A little gymnastics — chandelier work," he later explained. "I didn't chalk up properly and I went 15 feet to the concrete and fractured my skull. I was in intensive care for 72 hours, with a six-inch lineal fracture of the skull and a high temporal concussion." As a result, production of the series ended two weeks early. Conrad spent weeks in the hospital and had a long convalescence slowed by constant dizziness. The episode was eventually completed and aired early in the fourth season, with footage of the fall left in. Conrad later told Percy Shain of the Boston Globe, "I have the whole scene on film. It's a constant reminder to be careful. It also bolstered my determination to make this my last year with the series. Four seasons are enough of this sort of thing." Thereafter, Conrad was doubled for the dangerous stunts, but still participated in fight scenes.

Prior to The Wild Wild West, Ross Martin co-starred in the CBS series Mr. Lucky from 1959 to 1960, portraying Mr. Lucky's sidekick, Andamo. The series was created by Blake Edwards, who also cast Martin as villains in his films Experiment in Terror (1962) and The Great Race (1965).

Martin once called his role as Artemus Gordon "a show-off's showcase" because it allowed him to portray over 100 different characters and perform dozens of different dialects during the course of the series. He sketched his ideas for his characterizations and worked with the makeup artists to execute the final look. Martin told Percy Shain of the Boston Globe, "In the three years of the show, I have run a wider gamut than even those acknowledged masters of disguise, Paul Muni and Lon Chaney. Sometimes I feel like a one man repertory company. I think I've proven to myself and to the industry that I am the No. 1 character lead in films today." The industry acknowledged Martin's work with an Emmy nomination in 1969.

Martin broke his leg in a fourth-season episode, "The Night of the Avaricious Actuary", when he dropped a rifle, stepped on it, and his foot rolled over it. Martin told Percy Shain, "In the scene where I was hurt, my stand-in tried to finish it. When the shell ejected from the rifle, it caught him in the eye and burned it. We still haven't finished that scene. It will have to wait until I can move around again."

A few weeks later, after completing "The Night of Fire and Brimstone", Martin suffered a heart attack on August 17, 1968 (this was exactly two years after the show's creator, Michael Garrison, died). Martin's character was replaced temporarily by other agents played by Charles Aidman (four episodes as Jeremy Pike), Alan Hale Jr. (as Ned Brown) and William Schallert (two episodes as Frank Harper), and West worked solo in two other episodes. Aidman said the producers had promised to rewrite the scripts for his new character, but this simply amounted to scratching out the name "Artemus Gordon" and penciling in "Jeremy Pike" (his character's name). Pat Paulsen (one episode as Agent Bosley Cranston) is frequently thought of as a Martin substitute, but he appeared in one of Aidman's episodes, and his character would have been present even if Martin had appeared. Martin returned in mid-December to work in the final three episodes to be filmed.

=== Creation, writing and filming ===
In 1954, director/producer Gregory Ratoff purchased the film rights to Ian Fleming's first James Bond novel, Casino Royale, for $600. CBS, meanwhile, bought the TV rights for $1,000, and on October 21, 1954, the network broadcast an hour-long adaptation on its Climax! series, with Barry Nelson playing American agent "Jimmy Bond" and Peter Lorre playing the villain, Le Chiffre. CBS also approached Fleming about developing a Bond TV series. Fleming later contributed ideas to NBC's The Man from U.N.C.L.E..

In 1955, Ratoff and Michael Garrison formed a production company to make a Casino Royale film, with Ratoff set to direct and 20th Century Fox set to distribute. Production stalled when Ratoff and Garrison could not obtain financing. In 1960, Hedda Hopper reported that Ratoff's film would star Peter Finch as Bond. But Ratoff died that December and his widow sold the film rights to producer Charles K. Feldman for $75,000. Feldman and director Howard Hawks were interested in making Casino Royale with Cary Grant as Bond. Eventually Feldman was offered $500,000 and a percentage of the profits to let Harry Saltzman and Cubby Broccoli make the film with Sean Connery. Feldman turned them down, and eventually produced the spoof Casino Royale in 1967. By then, Garrison and CBS had brought James Bond to television in a unique way.

The series' pilot episode, "The Night of the Inferno", was filmed in December 1964. It was produced by Garrison and, according to Robert Conrad, cost $685,000. The episode was scripted by Gilbert Ralston, who had written for numerous episodic TV series in the 1950s and 1960s. (Western novelist and screenwriter Clair Huffaker also worked on the concept.) In a later deposition, Ralston explained that he was approached by Michael Garrison, who "said he had an idea for a series, good commercial idea, and wanted to know if I could glue the idea of a western hero and a James Bond type together in the same show." Ralston said he then created the Civil War characters, the format, the story outline and nine drafts of the pilot script that was the basis for the television series. It was his idea, for example, to have a secret agent named Jim West who would perform secret missions for President Ulysses S. Grant. Ralston later sued Warner Bros. over the 1999 theatrical film Wild Wild West, which was based on the series.

As indicated by Robert Conrad on his DVD commentary, the show went through several producers in its first season. This was apparently due to conflicts between the network and Garrison, who had no experience producing for television and had trouble staying on budget. At first, Ben Brady was named producer, but he was shifted to Rawhide, which had its own crisis when star Eric Fleming quit at the end of the 1964–65 season. Rawhide lasted another 13 episodes before it was cancelled by CBS.

The network then hired Collier Young. In an interview, Young said he saw the series as The Rogues set in 1870 (The Rogues, which he had produced, was about con men who swindled swindlers, much like the 1970s series Switch). Young also claimed to have added the wry second "Wild" to the series title, which had been simply "The Wild West" in its early stages of production. Young's episodes (2–4) featured a butler named Tennyson who traveled with West and Gordon, but since the episodes were not broadcast in production order, the character popped up at different times during the first season. Conrad was not sorry to see Young go: "I don't mind. All that guy did creatively was put the second 'wild' in the title. CBS did the right thing."

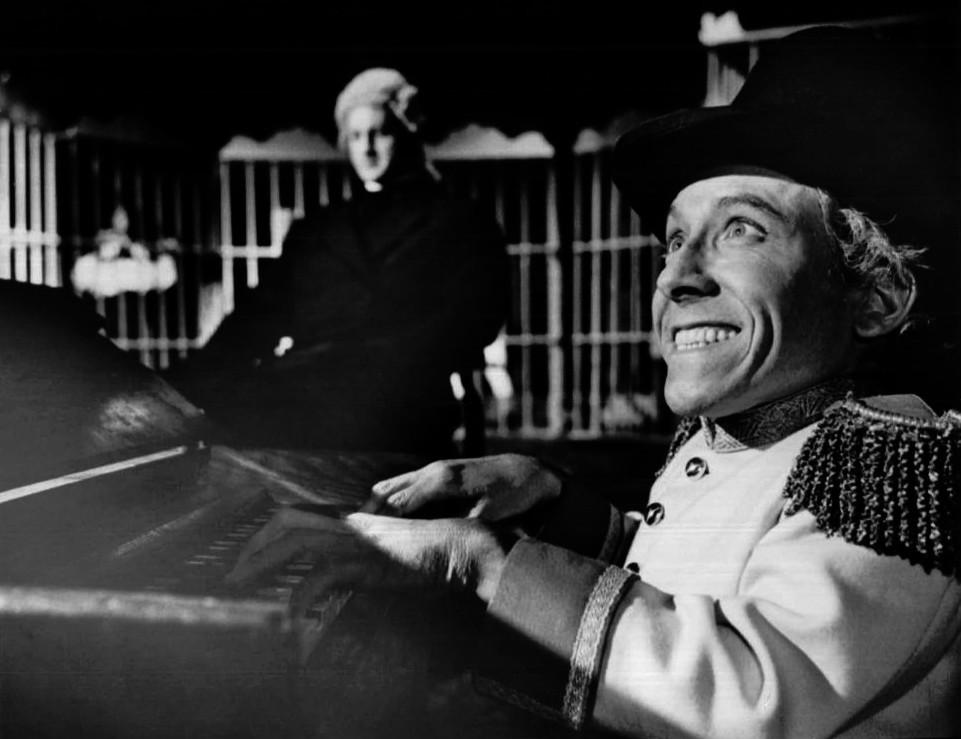
Michael Dunn as Doctor Loveless.

Young's replacement, Fred Freiberger, returned the series to its original concept. It was on his watch that writer John Kneubuhl, inspired by a magazine article about Michael Dunn, created the arch-villain Dr. Miguelito Quixote Loveless. Phoebe Dorin, who played Loveless' assistant, Antoinette, recalled: "Michael Garrison came to see [our] nightclub act when he was in New York. Garrison said to himself, 'Michael Dunn would make the most extraordinary villain. People have never seen anything like him before, and he's a fabulous little actor and he's funny as hell.' And, Garrison felt, if Michael Dunn sang on every show, with the girl, it would be an extraordinary running villain. He came backstage and he told us who he was and he said he was going to do a television show called The Wild Wild West and we would be called. We thought, 'Yeah, yeah, we've heard all that before.' But he did call us and the show was a fantastic success. And that's how it started, because he saw the nightclub act." Loveless was introduced in "The Night the Wizard Shook The Earth", the show's sixth produced, but third televised episode. The character became an immediate hit and Dunn was contracted to appear in four episodes per season. Because of health problems, however, Dunn appeared in only 10 episodes instead of 16.

After 10 episodes (5–14), Freiberger and executive producer Michael Garrison were, according to Variety, "unceremoniously dumped," reputedly due to a behind-the-scenes power struggle. Garrison was replaced by Phillip Leacock, the executive producer of Gunsmoke, and Freiberger was supplanted by John Mantley, an associate producer on Gunsmoke. The exchange stunned both cast and crew. Garrison, who owned 40% of The Wild Wild West, knew nothing about the changes and had not been consulted. He turned the matter over to his attorneys. Freiberger said, "I was fired for accomplishing what I had been hired to do. I was hired to pull the show together when it was in chaos." Conrad said, "I was totally shocked by it. Let's face it, the show is healthy. I think Fred Freiberger is totally correct in his concept of the show. It's an administrative change, for what reason I don't know."

Mantley produced seven (15–21) episodes, then returned to his former position on Gunsmoke and Gene L. Coon took over as associate producer. By then, Garrison's conflict with CBS was resolved and he returned to the executive producer role. Coon left after six episodes (22–27) to write First to Fight (1967), a Warner Bros. film about the Marines. Garrison produced the last episode of season 1 and the initial episodes of season 2.

Garrison's return was much to the relief of Ross Martin, who once revealed that he was so disenchanted during the first season that he tried to quit three times. He explained that Garrison "saw the show as a Bond spoof laid in 1870, and we all knew where we stood. Each new producer tried to put his stamp on the show and I had a terrible struggle. I fought them line by line in every script. They knew they couldn't change the James West role very much, but it was open season on Artemus Gordon because they had never seen anything like him before."

On August 17, 1966, however, during production of the new season's ninth episode, "The Night of the Ready-Made Corpse", Garrison fell down a flight of stairs in his home, fractured his skull and died. CBS assigned Bruce Lansbury, brother of actress Angela Lansbury, to produce the show for the remainder of its run. In the early 1960s Lansbury had been in charge of daytime shows at CBS Television City in Hollywood, then vice president of programming in New York. When he was tapped for The Wild Wild West, Lansbury was working with his twin brother, Edgar, producing legitimate theater on Broadway.

The first season's episodes were filmed in black and white and they were darker in tone. Cinematographer Ted Voightlander was nominated for an Emmy Award for his work on one of these episodes, "The Night of the Howling Light". Subsequent seasons were filmed in color and the show became noticeably campier.

The Wild Wild West was filmed at CBS Studio Center on Radford Avenue in Studio City in the San Fernando Valley. The 70-acre lot was formerly the home of Republic Studios, which specialized in low-budget films, including Westerns starring Roy Rogers and Gene Autry and Saturday morning serials (which The Wild Wild West appropriately echoed). CBS had a wall-to-wall lease on the lot starting in May 1963 and produced Gunsmoke and Rawhide there, as well as Gilligan's Island. The network bought the lot from Republic in February 1967 for $9.5 million. Beginning in 1971, MTM Enterprises (headed by actress Mary Tyler Moore and her then-husband Grant Tinker) became the Studio Center's primary tenant. In the mid-1980s the Western streets and sets were replaced with new sound stages and urban facades, including the New York streets seen in Seinfeld. In 1995, the lagoon set that was originally constructed for Gilligan's Island was paved over to create a parking lot.

Among iconic locations used for filming were Bronson Canyon ("Night of the Returning Dead" S02 E05) and Vasquez Rocks ("Night of the Cadre" S02 E26).

The TV movies used Old Tucson Studios and Apacheland Studios in Tucson, Arizona, and Gold Canyon, Arizona, respectively.

=== Train ===
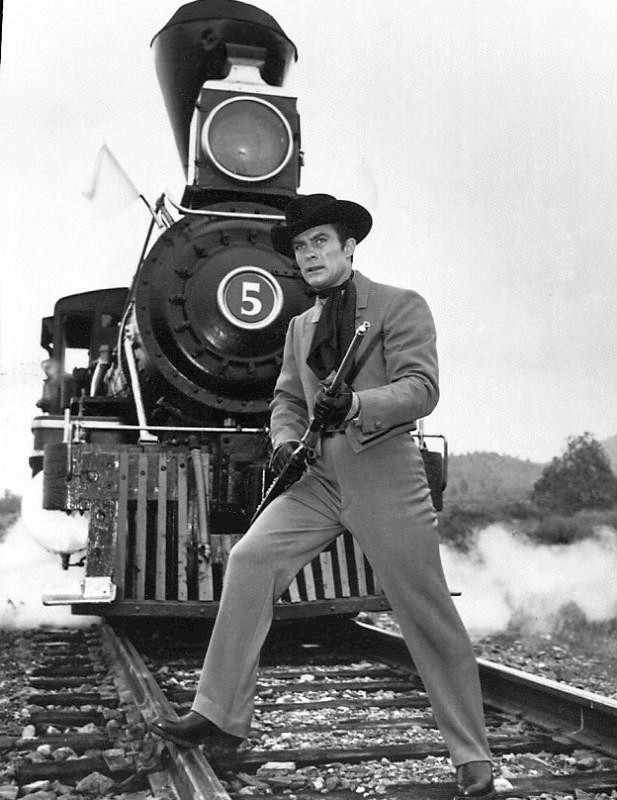
Conrad and locomotive Sierra No. 3. The number plate was changed to 5 for the pilot episode.

For the pilot episode, "The Night of the Inferno", the producers used Sierra Railroad No. 3, a 4-6-0 locomotive that was, fittingly, an anachronism: Sierra No. 3 was built in 1891, 15 to 20 years after the series was set. Footage of this train, with a 5 replacing the 3 on its number plate, was shot in Jamestown, California. Best known for its role as the Hooterville Cannonball in the CBS series Petticoat Junction, Sierra No. 3 probably appeared in more films and TV shows than any other locomotive in history. It was built by the Rogers Locomotive and Machine Works in Paterson, New Jersey.

When The Wild Wild West went into series production, however, an entirely different train was employed. The locomotive, a 4-4-0 named the Inyo, was built in 1875 by the Baldwin Locomotive Works in Philadelphia. Originally a wood-burner, the Inyo was converted to oil in 1910. The Inyo, as well as the express car and the passenger car, originally served the Virginia and Truckee Railroad in Nevada. They were among the V&T cars sold to Paramount Pictures in 1937–38. The Inyo appears in numerous films including High, Wide and Handsome (1938), Union Pacific (1939), the Marx Brothers' Go West (1940), Meet Me in St. Louis (1944), Red River (1948), Disney's The Great Locomotive Chase (1956) and McLintock! (1963). For The Wild Wild West, Inyo's original number plate was temporarily changed from No. 22 to No. 8 so that footage of the train could be flopped horizontally without the number appearing reversed. Footage of the Inyo in motion and idling was shot around Menifee, California, and reused in virtually every episode. Stock footage of Sierra No. 3 occasionally resurfaced as well.

These trains were used only for exterior shots. The luxurious interior of the passenger car was constructed on Stage 6 at CBS Studio Center. Designed by art director Albert Heschong, the set reportedly cost $35,000 in 1965 (over $290,000 in 2021 dollars). The interior was redesigned with lighter wood when the show switched to color for the 1966–67 season.

The train interior was also used in at least one episode of Gunsmoke ("Death Train", aired January 27, 1967) and in at least two episodes of The Big Valley ("Last Train to the Fair", aired April 27, 1966, and "Days of Wrath", aired January 8, 1968). All three series were filmed at CBS Studio Center and shared other exterior and interior sets. Additionally, the train interior was used for an episode of Get Smart ("The King Lives?", aired January 6, 1968) and the short-lived Barbary Coast ("Funny Money", aired September 8, 1975).

After its run on The Wild Wild West, the Inyo participated in the Golden Spike Centennial at Promontory, Utah, in 1969. The following year it appeared as a replica of the Central Pacific's "Jupiter" locomotive at the Golden Spike National Historical Site. The State of Nevada purchased the Inyo in 1974; it was restored to 1895 vintage, including a wider smoke stack and a new cowcatcher (pilot) without a drop coupler. The Inyo is still operational and displayed at the Nevada State Railroad Museum in Carson City. The express car (No. 21) and passenger car (No. 4) are also at the museum.

Another veteran V&T locomotive, the Reno (built in 1872 by Baldwin), was used in the two Wild Wild West TV movies. The Reno, which resembles the Inyo, is located at Old Tucson Studios.

The 1999 Wild Wild West film adaptation used the Baltimore & Ohio 4–4–0 No. 25, one of the oldest operating steam locomotives in the U.S. Built in 1856 at the Mason Machine Works in Taunton, Massachusetts, it was later renamed The William Mason in honor of its manufacturer. For its role as "The Wanderer" in the film, the engine was sent to the steam shops at the Strasburg Rail Road for restoration and repainting. The locomotive is brought out for the B&O Train Museum in Baltimore's "Steam Days".

Both the Inyo and The William Mason appeared in the Disney film The Great Locomotive Chase (1956).

=== Theme music ===
The main title theme was written by Richard Markowitz, who previously composed the theme for the TV series The Rebel. He was brought in after the producers rejected two attempts by film composer Dimitri Tiomkin.

In an interview by Susan Kesler (for her book The Wild Wild West: The Series) included in the first season DVD boxed set, Markowitz recalled that the original Tiomkin theme "was very, kind of, traditional, it just seemed wrong." Markowitz explained his own approach: "By combining jazz with Americana, I think that's what nailed it. That took it away from the serious kind of thing that Tiomkin was trying to do...What I did essentially was write two themes: the rhythmic, contemporary theme, Fender bass and brushes, that vamp, for the cartoon effects and for West's getting himself out of trouble, and the heraldic western outdoor theme over that, so that the two worked together."

Session musicians who played on the theme were Tommy Morgan (harmonica); Bud Shank, Ronnie Lang, Plas Johnson and Gene Cipriano (woodwinds); Vince DeRosa and Henry Sigismonti (French horns); Uan Rasey, Ollie Mitchell and Tony Terran (trumpets); Dick Nash, Lloyd Ulyate, Chauncey Welsch and Kenny Shroyer (trombones); Tommy Tedesco and Bill Pitman (guitars); Carol Kaye (Fender bass); Joe Porcaro (brushes) and Gene Estes, Larry Bunker and Emil Richards (timpani, percussion).

Markowitz, however, was never credited for his theme in any episode; it is believed that this was due to legal difficulties between CBS and Tiomkin over the rejection of the latter's work. Markowitz did receive "music composed and conducted by" credits for episodes he had scored (such as "The Night of the Bars of Hell" and "The Night of the Raven") or where he supplied the majority of tracked-in cues (such as "The Night of the Grand Emir" and "The Night of the Gypsy Peril"). He finally received "theme by" credit on both of the TV movies, which were scored by Jeff Alexander rather than Markowitz (few personnel from the series were involved with the TV movies).

=== Graphics ===
The animated title sequence was another unique element of the series. Created by Michael Garrison Productions and DePatie-Freleng Enterprises, it was directed by Isadore "Friz" Freleng and animated by Ken Mundie, who designed the titles for the film The Great Race and the TV series Secret Agent, I Spy, Rawhide and Death Valley Days.

The screen was divided into four corner panels abutting a narrow central panel that contained a cartoon "hero". The hero looked more like a traditional cowboy than either West or Gordon, and from each corner panel encountered cliché western characters and situations that never appeared in the show. In the three seasons shot in color, the overall backdrop was an abstracted wash of the flag of the United States, with the upper left panel colored blue and the others containing horizontal red stripes.

The original animation sequence is:

- The hero strikes a match, lights a cigar, and begins walking in profile to the right.
- Behind the hero, in the lower left panel, a bandito backs out of a bank; the hero subdues him with a karate chop to the back.
- In the upper right panel, a cardsharp tries to pull an ace of spades from his boot, but the hero draws his gun and the cardsharp drops the ace.
- In the upper left panel, a gunman picks up and points a six-shooter at the hero, who drops his gun and puts his hands up. The hero shoots the gunman with his sleeve Derringer; the gunman's hand falls limp. The hero then quickly retrieves his own gun and puts it back in his holster.
- A woman in the lower right panel taps the hero on the hat with her parasol. He pulls her close and kisses her. She draws a knife but, mesmerized by his kiss, turns away and slumps against the side of the frame. He tips his hat and walks away with his back to the camera. There were two versions of this vignette; this one appears during the first season. When the show switched to color, the hero knocked the woman down with a right cross to the jaw. This variant also appears in the original pilot episode (included on the DVD release) when the series was titled The Wild West. Despite this, James West never hit a woman in any episode, although he grappled with many. The closest he came was when he slammed a door against the shotgun-holding evil Countess Zorana in "The Night of the Iron Fist". In "The Night of the Running Death", he slugged a woman named Miss Tyler, but "she" was a man in drag (actor T. C. Jones). The original animation, with the hero winning the woman over with a kiss, was a more accurate representation of West's methods than the right cross.
- The hero walks away into the distance and the camera zooms into his panel. The title The Wild Wild West appears. The camera then swish pans to an illustration of the train, with Conrad's and Martin's names on the ends of different cars.

Each episode had four acts. At the end of each act, the scene, usually a cliffhanger moment, would freeze, and a sketch or photograph of the scene replaced the cartoon art in one of the corner panels. The style of freeze-frame art changed over the course of the series. In all first-season episodes other than the pilot, the panels were live-action stills made to evoke 19th-century engravings. In season 2, (the first in color) the scenes dissolved to tinted stills; from "The Night of the Flying Pie Plate" on, however, the panels were home to Warhol-like serigraphs of the freeze-frames.

The end credits were displayed over each episode's unique mosaic of scenes. In the final season, however, a generic design was used under the end credits. Curiously, in this design, the bank robber is unconscious, the cardsharp has no card and the lady is on the ground, but the six-shooter in the upper left-hand panel has returned. The freeze-frame graphics were shot at a facility called Format Animation. The pilot is the only episode in which the center panel of the hero is replaced by a sketch of the final scene of an act; he is replaced by the villainous General Cassinello (Nehemiah Persoff) at the end of the third act.

During the first season, the series title The Wild Wild West was set in the font Barnum, which resembles the newer font P. T. Barnum. In subsequent seasons, the title appeared in a hand-drawn version of the font Dolphin (which resembles newer fonts called Zebrawood, Circus and Rodeo Clown). Robert Conrad's name was also set in this font. Ross Martin's name was set in the font Bracelet (which resembles newer fonts named Tuscan Ornate and Romantiques). All episode titles, writer and director credits, guest cast and crew credits were set in Barnum. During commercial breaks, the title "The Wild Wild West" also appeared in Barnum.

This teaser part of the show was incorporated into The History Channel's Wild West Tech (2003–05).

=== Dates given in the series ===
The series is generally set during the presidency of Ulysses S. Grant from 1869 to 1877; occasional episodes indicate a more precise date:

- "The Night of the Glowing Corpse" (S1E7) is set during the Franco-Prussian War of July 19, 1870 – May 10, 1871.
- "The Night of the Eccentrics" (S2E1) takes place four years after the execution in 1867 of Emperor Maximilian I of Mexico, i.e. 1871. This is supported by a reference to President Benito Juárez, who stepped down in 1872.
- In "The Night of the Eccentrics", Count Manzeppi hums "Ride of the Valkyries" which was first performed on June 26, 1870.
- "The Night of the Man Eating House" (S2E12) states that Liston Day has been in solitary confinement for 30 years and later that he was arrested April 23, 1836. This would put it around 1866, three years before the Grant presidency began.
- In "The Night of the Brain" (S2E21), Artemus Gordon shows James West a newspaper dated July 12, 1872. West states, "July 12, that's an interesting date, but it happens to be tomorrow." After the events described happen, they again get tomorrow's newspaper and we see the date: July 14, 1872.
- "The Night of the Lord of Limbo" (S2E15) takes place seven years after the end of the Civil War, making it 1872.
- "The Night of the Tartar" (S2E19) takes place five years after the 1867 purchase of Alaska [i.e., 1872]
- "The Night of the Whirring Death" (S1E20) opens with the caption San Francisco 1874.
- "The Night of the Returning Death" is set 13 years after the start of the Civil War [i.e., 1874]
- In "The Night of the Flaming Ghost" (S1E18), West says, "If the real John Brown had lived he'd be almost 75 years old by now." Brown was born May 9, 1800.
- In "The Night of the Arrow" (S3E16), a cavalry officer resigns his commission as of April 6, 1874.
- In "The Night of the Avaricious Actuary" (S4E11), the heading of a letter shown on screen is dated 1875.
- In "The Night of the Underground Terror" (S3E19), the sadistic commandant of a prison camp is said to have escaped justice for 10 years, presumably from the end of the war in 1865.
- In "The Night of the Samurai" (S3E6), Baron Saigo says Admiral Perry took the sword over 30 years earlier. Assuming the date of Perry's first visit to Japan (July 8, 1853), that would mean the episode takes place after 1883, or some six years after the end of the Grant presidency.
- In "The Night that Terror Stalked the Town", Loveless has a headstone prepared for West, showing his birthdate as July 2, 1842.
- In "The Night of the Kraken" (S4E6), there is an assassination attempt on Admiral David Farragut, who died in 1870.

== Cancellation ==
Some episodes were considered violent for their time and that, rather than low ratings, ultimately was the series' downfall. In addition to gunplay, there were usually two fight sequences per episode. These were choreographed by stuntman and bit player Whitey Hughes and Conrad and performed by Conrad and a stock company of stuntmen, including Red West, Dick Cangey and Bob Herron (who doubled for Ross Martin).

After Conrad suffered a concussion falling from a chandelier in "The Night of the Fugitives", the network insisted that he defer to a stunt double (his chair on the set was newly inscribed: "Robert Conrad, ex-stuntman, retired by CBS, Jan. 24, 1968"). "[W]hen I came back for the fourth season, I was limited to what I could do for insurance reasons," Conrad explained. "So I agreed and gradually I did all the fights but couldn't do anything five feet off the ground and of course that went out the window." He was doubled by Jimmy George. Often, George would start a stunt, such as a high fall or a dive through a window, then land behind boxes or off-camera where Conrad was hidden and waiting to seamlessly complete the action. This common stunt technique, known by filmmakers as "the Texas Switch", was often used by Ross Martin and his double, Bob Herron.

It was hazardous work. Hughes recalled, "We had a lot of crashes. We used to say, 'Roll the cameras and call the ambulances!'" Conrad recalled in 1994, "The injuries started at the top. Robert Conrad: 6-inch fracture of the skull, high temporal concussion, partial paralysis. Ross Martin: broken leg. A broken skull for Red West. Broken leg for Jimmy George. Broken arm for Jack Skelly. And Michael Dunn: head injury and a spinal sprain. He did his own stunts. And on and on."

As a result of the April 1968 assassination of Martin Luther King and the June 1968 assassination of Robert F. Kennedy, President Johnson created the U.S. National Commission on the Causes and Prevention of Violence. One of the questions it tackled was whether violence on television, including graphic news coverage of the Vietnam War, was a contributing factor to violence in American society. The television networks, anticipating these allegations, moved to curtail violence on their entertainment programs before the September start of the 1968–69 television season. Television reporter Cynthia Lowrey, in an article published in August 1968, wrote that The Wild Wild West "is one of the action series being watched by network censors for scenes of excessive violence, even if the violence is all in fun."

However, despite a CBS mandate to tone down the mayhem, "The Night of the Egyptian Queen" (aired November 15, 1968) contains perhaps the series' most ferocious barroom brawl. A later memo attached to the shooting script of "The Night of Miguelito's Revenge" (aired December 13, 1968) reads: "Note to Directors: The producer respectfully asks that no violent acts be shot which are not depicted in the script or discussed beforehand. Most particularly stay away from gratuitous ad-libs, such as slaps, pointing of firearms or other weapons at characters (especially in close quarters), kicks and the use of furniture and other objects in fight scenes." Strict limits were placed on the number of so-called "acts of violence" in the last episodes of the season (and thus the series). James West rarely wears a gun in these episodes and rather than the usual fisticuffs, fight sequences involved tossing, tackling or body blocking the villains.

In December 1968, executives from ABC, CBS and NBC appeared before the President's Commission. The most caustic of the commissioners, Rep. Hale Boggs (D-Louisiana), decried what he called "the Saturday morning theme of children's cartoon shows" that permit "the good guy to do anything in the name of justice." He also indicted CBS for featuring sadism in its primetime programing (The Wild Wild West was subsequently identified as one example). The Congressman did, however, commend CBS for a 25% decline in violence programming in prime time compared to the other two networks.

Three months later, in March 1969, Sen. John O. Pastore (D-Rhode Island) called the same network presidents before his Senate communications subcommittee for a public scolding on the same subject. At Pastore's insistence, the networks promised tighter industry self-censorship and the Surgeon General began a $1 million study on the effects of television. Congress's concern was shared by the public: in a nationwide poll, 67.5% of 1,554 Americans agreed with the hypothesis that TV and movie violence prompted violence in real life.

Additionally, the National Association for Better Broadcasting (NABB), in a report eventually issued in November 1969, rated The Wild Wild West "as one of the most violent series on television."

After being excoriated by the two committees, networks scrambled to expunge violence from their programming. The Wild Wild West received its cancellation notice in mid-February, even before Pastore's committee convened. Producer Bruce Lansbury always claimed that "It was a sacrificial lamb … It went off with a 32 or 33 share which in those days was virtually break-even but it always won its time period." This is confirmed by an article by Associated Press reporter Joseph Mohbat: "Shows like ABC's 'Outcasts' and NBC's 'Outsider', which depended heavily on violence, were scrapped. CBS killed 'The Wild, Wild West' despite high ratings because of criticism. It was seen by the network as a gesture of good intentions." The networks played it safe thereafter: of the 22 new television shows that debuted in the fall of 1969, not one was a Western or detective drama; 14 were comedy or variety series.

Conrad denounced Pastore for many years, but in other interviews he admitted that it probably was time to cancel the series because he felt that he and the stuntmen were pushing their luck. He also believed the role had hurt his craft. "In so many roles I was a tough guy and I never advanced much," Conrad explained. "Wild Wild West was action adventure. I jumped off roofs and spent all my time with the stuntmen instead of other actors. I thought that's what the role demanded. That role had no dimension other than what it was—a caricature of a performance. It was a comic strip character."

== Domestic and foreign syndication ==
The series was shown in the United Kingdom on the ITV network starting May 5, 1968. It was reasonably popular but has not been seen on British terrestrial television since the early 1980s. In France, the series was known locally as Les Mystères de l'Ouest, where it was successful since all four seasons were released in a DVD boxed set there before they were released in the U.S.

In the summer of 1970, CBS reran several episodes of The Wild Wild West on Mondays at 10 p.m. as a summer replacement for The Carol Burnett Show. These episodes were "The Night of the Bleak Island" (aired July 6); "The Night of the Big Blackmail" (July 13); "The Night of the Kraken" (July 20); "The Night of the Diva" (July 27); "The Night of the Simian Terror" (August 3); "The Night of the Bubbling Death" (August 11); "The Night of the Returning Dead" (August 17); "The Night of the Falcon" (August 24); "The Night of the Underground Terror" (August 31); and "The Night of the Sedgewick Curse" (September 7). Curiously, none of these featured the most frequent and popular villain, Dr. Loveless.

TV critic Lawrence Laurent wrote, "The return of Wild Wild West even for a summer re-run isn't surprising. CBS-TV was never really very eager to cancel this series, since over a four-year run that began in 1965 the Wild Wild West had been a solid winner in the ratings. Cancellation came mainly because CBS officials were concerned about the criticism over televised violence and to a lesser degree because Robert Conrad had grown slightly weary of the role of James West. Ever since last fall's ratings started rolling in, CBS has wished that it had kept Wild Wild West. None of the replacements have done nearly as well and, as a result, all of the Friday programs suffered."

That fall, CBS put the program into syndication, giving it new life on local stations across the country. This further antagonized the anti-violence lobby, since the program was now broadcast weekdays and often after school. One group, The Foundation to Improve Television (FIT), filed a suit on November 12, 1970, to prevent WTOP in Washington, D.C., from airing The Wild Wild West weekday afternoons at 4 pm. The suit was brought in Washington, D.C., specifically to gain government and media attention. The suit said the series "contains fictionalized violence and horror harmful to the mental health and well-being of minor children", and should not air before 9 pm. WTOP's vice president and general manager, John R. Corporan, was quoted as saying, "Since programs directed specifically at children are broadcast in the late afternoon by three other TV stations, it is our purpose to counter-program with programming not directed specifically at children." U.S. District Court Judge John J. Sirica, who later presided over the trial of the Watergate burglars and ordered U.S. President Richard Nixon to turn over White House recordings, dismissed the lawsuit in January 1971, referring FIT to take their complaint to the FCC. FIT appealed, but a year and a half later the U.S. Court of Appeals upheld the district court decision dismissing the suit on the grounds that FIT had not exhausted the administrative remedies available to them. By then, WTOP had stopped broadcasting the series altogether. At that time, the show was in reruns on about 57 other local stations across the country, including WOR in New York and WFLD in Chicago.

In October 1973, the Los Angeles-based National Association for Better Broadcasting (NABB) reached a landmark agreement with KTTV, a local station, to purge 42 violent cartoon programs, including Mighty Mouse, Magilla Gorilla, Speed Racer and Gigantor. Additionally, the NABB cited 81 syndicated live-action shows that "may have a detrimental influence on some children who are exposed to such programming without parental guidance or perspective" when they are telecast before 8:30 p.m. This list included The Wild Wild West, The Avengers, Batman, The Man from U.N.C.L.E., Roy Rogers, Wanted: Dead or Alive and The Lone Ranger. In Los Angeles, such shows opened with a cautionary announcement: "Parents — we wish to advise that because of violence or other possible harmful elements, certain portions of the following program may not be suitable for young children." The NABB hoped to use the cartoon ban and warning announcement as a model for similar agreements with other local stations.

By then, The Wild Wild West was running on 99 local stations. Its ongoing popularity throughout the 1970s prompted two television movie sequels, The Wild Wild West Revisited (1979) and More Wild Wild West (1980) (see below). By the spring of 1985, the original series was still carried on 74 local stations.

In the late 1980s, the series was still seen on local stations in Boston, Hartford, Philadelphia, Pittsburgh and Los Angeles, among other cities. Significantly, WGN (Chicago), which carried the show at 10 a.m. on Sundays, became available nationally through cable television.

In 1994, The Wild Wild West began running on Saturdays at 10 a.m. on Turner Network Television (TNT), which preferred the color episodes to the black and white ones. The series was dropped from WGN soon after. Hallmark Channel aired the series in 2005 as part of its slate of Saturday afternoon Westerns but dropped it after only a few weeks.

While the series became scarce on television, each season was released on DVD, beginning with season 1 in 2006 and concluding with the final season early in 2008 (see below). In 2014, it was announced that the series was being prepped for Blu-ray.

In 2006, the series began running weekdays and/or weekends on MeTV, then Sundays on the Heroes & Icons digital channel. As of 2024, The Wild Wild West is currently airing on MeTV on Saturday mornings. The show has its own streaming channel on Pluto TV, where viewers can watch it run in order or on demand. As of 2015, the series aired in the United Kingdom on the Horror Channel.

=== Television films ===
Conrad and Martin reunited for two satirical comedy television film sequels, The Wild Wild West Revisited (broadcast May 9, 1979) and More Wild Wild West (broadcast October 7, 1980). Revisited introduced Paul Williams as Miguelito Loveless Jr., the son of the agents' nemesis. Loveless planned to substitute clones for the crowned heads of Europe and the President of the United States. This plot is similar to the second-season episode "The Night of the Brain", which featured a different villain.

Most of the exteriors were filmed at Old Tucson Studios in Arizona, where there are Western sets and a functioning steam train and tracks. Interiors were shot at CBS Studio Center. Ross Martin said, "We worked on a lot of the same sets at the studio, including the interiors of the old train. We used the same guns and gimmicks and wardrobes – with the waistlines let out a little bit. The script, unlike the old shows, is played strictly for comedy. It calls for us to be ten years older than when we were last seen. There are a lot more laughs than adventure."

More Wild Wild West was initially conceived as a rematch between the agents and Miguelito Jr., but Williams was on tour and unavailable for the film; his character was changed to Albert Paradine II and played by Jonathan Winters. This explains why the story begins with various clones of Paradine being murdered; the first film ends with word that Loveless had cloned himself five times. Paradine planned world conquest using a formula for invisibility, recalling the first-season episode "The Night of the Burning Diamond".

Both TV films were campier than the TV series, although Conrad and Martin played their roles straight. Both films were directed by veteran comedy Western director Burt Kennedy and written by William Bowers (in the latter case with Tony Kayden, from a story by Bowers); neither Kennedy nor Bowers had worked on the original series. The Wild Wild West Revisited takes the agents to a town called Wagon Gap. This was a nod to the Abbott and Costello film, The Wistful Widow of Wagon Gap (1947), which was based on a treatment by Bowers and D. D. Beauchamp of a short story by Beauchamp.

Conrad once revealed that CBS intended to do yearly TV revivals of The Wild Wild West. Variety, in its review of the first TV movie, concurred: "A couple of more movies in this vein, sensibly spaced, could work in the future." Ross Martin's death in 1981, however, put an end to the idea. Conrad was later quoted in Cinefantastique about these films: "We all got along fine with each other when we did these, but I wasn't happy with them only because CBS imposed a lot of restrictions on us. They never came up to the level of what we had done before."

== Home media ==
The first season of The Wild Wild West was released on DVD in North America on June 6, 2006, by CBS Home Entertainment (distributed by Paramount Home Entertainment). Although it was touted as a special 40th anniversary edition, it appeared 41 years after the show's 1965 debut. Robert Conrad recorded audio introductions for all 28 first-season episodes, plus a commentary track for the pilot. The set also featured audio interviews by Susan Kesler (for her book, The Wild Wild West: The Series), and 1970s era footage of Conrad and Martin on a daytime talk show. The second season was released on DVD on March 20, 2007; the third season was released on November 20, 2007; and the fourth and final season was released on March 18, 2008. None of the later season sets contained bonus material.

A 27-disc complete series set was released on November 4, 2008. It contains all 104 episodes of the series, as well as both reunion telefilms.

On May 12, 2015, CBS Home Entertainment released a repackaged version of the complete series set, at a lower price, but did not include the bonus disc that was part of the original complete series set. On June 13, 2016, the bonus disc was released as a standalone item.

In France, where the series (known locally as Les Mystères de l'Ouest) was a big hit, all four seasons were released in a DVD boxed set before their American release. The French set, released by TF1 Video, includes many of the extras on the American season 1 set and many others. "The Night of the Inferno" is presented twice – as a regular episode in English with Conrad's audio commentary, and in a French-dubbed version. All of the episodes are presented in English with French subtitles, and several episode titles differ in translation from the original English titles. For example, "The Night of the Gypsy Peril", "The Night of the Simian Terror" and "The Night of Jack O'Diamonds" respectively translate as "The Night of the White Elephant", "The Night of the Beast" and "The Night of the Thoroughbred". Both TV movies are included as extras, but only in French-dubbed versions. The set also features a 1999 interview with Robert Conrad at the Mirande Country Music Festival in France.

== Theatrical film adaptation ==
Warner Bros. optioned the film rights to The Wild Wild West in 1992. Mel Gibson was cast as James West, with Richard Donner set to direct from a screenplay by Shane Black (Donner had directed three episodes of the original series). In 1997, as the film was still being developed with other directors, writers and stars, Gilbert Ralston, who wrote the TV pilot, sued Warner Bros. over the upcoming feature film based on the series he helped create. Ralston died in 1999 before his suit was settled; however, Warner Bros. paid his family between $600,000 and $1.5 million.

In 1999, a theatrical feature-length film co-produced and directed by Barry Sonnenfeld was released as Wild Wild West (without the definite article used in the series title). Loosely based on the original series, the film re-imagined James West as a Black man (played by Will Smith), and Artemus Gordon (played by Kevin Kline) was portrayed as egotistical and bitterly competitive with West. Significant changes were also made to Dr. Loveless (played by Kenneth Branagh). No longer a dwarf, he was portrayed as a legless double amputee confined to a steam-powered wheelchair (similar to that employed by the villain in the episode "The Night of the Brain"). Loveless, whose first name was changed from Miguelito to Arliss, was a bitter Southerner who sought revenge on the North after the American Civil War.

Robert Conrad was reportedly offered a cameo as President Grant, but turned it down when the producers wanted him to read for the part. He was outspoken in his criticism of the film, which was now a comedic showcase for Will Smith with little in common with the original series. He was not opposed to casting a Black actor as Jim West: "The African-American casting of that role is probable and should not be an issue," Conrad said. "I think the casting of (Will) Smith is the issue. I appreciate his popularity. However, I'd prefer an actor with more athletic prowess. He's a good comedian but just not my choice to play my role. Best would be a Wesley Snipes body with a Denzel Washington head." Conrad was also offended by the racial overtones of the film. "There is a reference in it to a racial slur," Conrad said. "I hope it's not in the final version. I said, 'Why are we going in this direction. Why not just play James West black without explaining it?' He also criticized the casting of Branagh as a double amputee, rather than a little-person actor, in the role of Loveless. "Michael Dunn did such a great job playing Dr. Loveless, and he was by far the best villain on the show," Conrad said. "There are so many talented dwarfs but they wanted Kenneth Branagh." In a New York Post interview (July 3, 1999), Conrad stated that he disliked the film and that contractually he was owed a share of money on merchandising that he was not paid. He also had a long-standing feud with producer Jon Peters. "He was dating my 17-year-old daughter," Conrad explained, "saying he was divorced when he wasn't."

Conrad later took special delight in accepting the Golden Raspberry Awards for the film in 1999. It was awarded Worst Picture, Worst Director, Worst Screenplay, Worst Original Song (for the song "Wild Wild West" by Smith) and Worst Screen Couple.

In 2009, Will Smith apologized publicly to Conrad while doing promotion for Seven Pounds:

I made a mistake on Wild Wild West. That could have been better. ...No, it's funny because I could never understand why Robert Conrad was so upset with Wild Wild West. And now I get it. It's like, 'That's my baby! I put my blood, sweat and tears into that!' So I'm going to apologize to Mr. Conrad for that because I didn't realize. I was young and immature. So much pain and joy went into [my series] The Fresh Prince that my greatest desire would be that it's left alone.

— Will Smith, Total Film magazine, Feb. 2009, Issue 151, pp. 120–125, Will Smith: The Total Film Interview, by Lesley O'Toole, Future Publishing Ltd., London, England

== In other media ==
The series spawned several merchandising spin-offs, including a seven-issue comic book series by Gold Key Comics, and a paperback novel, Richard Wormser's The Wild Wild West, published in 1966 by Signet (ISBN 0-451-02836-8), which adapted the episode "The Night of the Double-Edged Knife".

=== Books ===
In 1988, Arnett Press published The Wild Wild West: The Series by Susan E. Kesler (ISBN 0-929360-00-1), a thorough production history and episode guide.

In 1998, Berkeley Books published three novels by author Robert Vaughan – The Wild Wild West (ISBN 0-425-16372-5), The Night of the Death Train (ISBN 0-425-16449-7), and The Night of the Assassin (ISBN 0-425-16517-5).

In 2019, Epic Press published a new novel by Joseph Covino Jr, paying tribute to the series with a novel faithful in both style and spirit, Night of the Nobility Cult: A Wild, Wild Western.

=== Comics ===
In 1990, Millennium Publications produced a four-issue comic book miniseries ("The Night of the Iron Tyrants") scripted by Mark Ellis with art by Darryl Banks. A sequel to the TV series, it involved Dr. Loveless in a conspiracy to assassinate President Grant and the President of Brazil and put the Knights of the Golden Circle into power. The characters of Voltaire and Antoinette were prominent here, despite their respective early departures from Dr. Loveless' side in the original series. A review from the Mile High Comics site states: "This mini-series perfectly captures the fun mixture of western and spy action that marked the ground-breaking 1960s TV series." The storyline of the comics miniseries was optioned for motion picture development.

In the 75th volume of the Belgian comic book series Lucky Luke (L'Homme de Washington), published in 2008, both James West and Artemus Gordon have a minor guest appearance, albeit the names have been changed to "James East" and "Artémius Gin".

=== Television ===
When Robert Conrad hosted Saturday Night Live on NBC (January 23, 1982), he appeared in a parody of The Wild Wild West. President Lincoln states his famous quip that, if General U.S. Grant is a drunk, he should send whatever he is drinking to his other, less successful generals. Lincoln dispatches West and Gordon (Joe Piscopo) to find out what Grant drinks. They discover that Grant is held captive by Velvet Jones (Eddie Murphy).

=== Soundtrack album ===
On July 11, 2017, La-La Land Records released a limited edition 4-disc set of music from the series, featuring Richard Markowitz's theme, episode scores by Markowitz, Robert Drasnin, Dave Grusin, Richard Shores, Harry Geller, Walter Scharf, Jack Pleis and Fred Steiner and Dimitri Tiomkin's unused theme music.

=== Contemporary merchandise ===
Like many television series, The Wild Wild West had several merchandise tie-ins during its run:

Year	Item	Manufacturer or Publisher
1966	Paperback novel by Richard Wormser	Signet Books
1966	Board Game	Transogram Co.
1966(?)	Ross Martin and Robert Conrad Note Pads	Top Flight Paper Co.
1966	Secret "Sleeve Gun"^{[a]}	Ray Plastics
1966–1969	Gold Key Comic Books (7 issues)	Western Publishing Co.
1969	Lunch Box and Thermos	Aladdin Co.

Notes

^[a] This item was not marketed with the series' name. However, The Wild Wild West was the only television series at the time that featured the item.

The Lunch Box had two scenes. One showed West and Gordon riding horses to stop a train hijacked by outlaws. The other side showed West swinging on a trapline over a burning chasm to kick a gun out of a villain's hand while Gordon was trapped on the other side of the chasm.

Marx produced a James West 12" action figure, intended as a western/cowboy competitor to GI Joe, but licensing issues caused them to scuttle their plans; the James West heads were used subsequently for their Captain Maddox figure, and the James West bodies were used for their Sam Cobra figures. An actual GI Joe figure dressed as James West on an oversized chess board was used in the episode “The Night of the Brain”.

== Proposed revivals ==
After the success of the first TV movie, CBS planned to revive the show as a series of yearly specials. The death of Ross Martin in 1981 ended that discussion. On October 5, 2010, Entertainment Weekly reported that Ronald D. Moore and Naren Shankar were developing a remake of The Wild Wild West for television, but the project apparently stalled. In December 2013, Moore told Wired that "Wild Wild West and Star Trek were two of my great loves. I watched both in syndication in the '70s. Wild Wild West was really interesting, that combination of genres—a Western and secret agent, and they dabbled in the occult and paranormal. I really wanted to do a new version for CBS. I still think it's a great property. Someday I hope to go back to it."

A pastiche webseries titled Back to the Wild Wild West began production in November 2011, but apparently has been stalled.

== See also ==
- Weird West
- The Adventures of Brisco County, Jr.
