= What Makes Sammy Run? (musical) =

Cast Album of the original Broadway production

What Makes Sammy Run? is a musical with music and lyrics written by Ervin Drake and a book by Budd Schulberg and Stuart Schulberg. The story, based on Budd Schulberg's 1941 novel of the same name, centers on a ruthlessly ambitious young man who schemes his way to the top of the Hollywood studio food chain in the 1930s, betraying friends and lovers in his wake.

The musical premiered on Broadway in 1964 at the 54th Street Theater.

== Productions ==
The show played on Broadway from February 15, 1964 to June 12, 1965 at the 54th Street Theater, running for 540 performances. It was directed by Abe Burrows. Steve Lawrence starred as Sammy Glick, with Robert Alda as studio boss Al Manheim and Sally Ann Howes as Sammy's love interest, Kit Sargent. Graciela Daniele played Rio Rita. The production was estimated to have lost $285,000 on a $400,000 investment. At the 18th Tony Awards, Lawrence was nominated for the Tony Award for Best Actor in a Musical. A cast album was released on March 16, 1964.

A 1966 production on the West Coast starred Frank Gorshin, and an off-Broadway revival was staged in 2006 at the West End Theater with rewrites by its director Robert Armin.

== Synopsis ==
=== Act I ===
At the New York Record, copy boy Sammy Glick eagerly darts around, collecting the day's new stories from the reporters, like Al Manhaim. He shows O'Brien, the Managing Editor, some typographical errors. Sammy is ambitious and enterprising: he earns money on the side, too. He buys "A New Pair of Shoes", fancy ones, the first chance he gets. Sammy asks AI for advice on his first radio column. Al notes that Sammy stole it from a book written by Kit Sargent. O’Brien publishes "Sammy's" article instead of Al's drama column. Al is amazed when Sammy protests that he was "helping" Al by making the entertainment page better ("You Help Me"). Sammy persuades a talented writer, Julian Blumberg, to let Sammy "help" him get his radio script produced. He uses Al's connections to get an agent to sell the script under Sammy's name to Hollywood producer Sidney Fineman.

Soon Sammy is hired to write scripts for World-Wide Pictures in Los Angeles, where he meets rising star Rita Rio, tough-guy assistant director Sheik Orsini, and writer Kit Sargent. Kit has "A Tender Spot" for difficult men, so she falls for Sammy. Al shows up at the studio, looking to adapt a script for the movies, and Sammy takes the credit for finding him. Kit joins Al and Sammy to lampoon film plots ("Lights! Camera! Platitude!") Sidney sees that Sammy is a Hollywood natural — unsavory, duplicitous and glory-seeking ("My Home Town"). Sammy suggests a film plot to Sidney, stolen from the Joan Crawford movie Rain: Monsoon, written by Sammy's ghostwriter, Julian, stars Rita Rio. At an industry showing, Sammy and Kit continue their affair.

Investor H. R. Harrington, who might purchase control of the studio, and his spoiled daughter Laurette see the film. Sammy realizes that if he can win Laurette, he could eventually head the studio, but Laurette fantasizes about crushing Sammy ("I See Something"). Al hopes for romance with Kit, but she turns him down ("Maybe Some Other Time"). Monsoon is a hit, and Sidney gives Sammy his own film unit. A disappointed Al goes to the airport to fly east. Sammy suggests a sexy weekend with Kit in Mexico ("You Can Trust Me: A Room Without Windows"). Laurette calls Kit, wanting Sammy to take her out on the town. Sammy slinks away from Kit, but when he calls for Laurette, she acts uninterested. Everyone is unhappy ("Kiss Me No Kisses").

=== Act II ===
Sammy's new film, Paint a Rainbow, gives a red carpet premiere at Grauman's Chinese Theatre. Sammy is interviewed about his success ("I Feel Humble"). Sammy wants Kit to write a new film, Sob Sister, but she will not speak to him. Sammy flies east to persuade Al to phone Kit in Los Angeles and propose marriage so that the two will write the screenplay together. Kit, not realizing the implications of the proposal, believes that she has "Something to Live For". Sammy's low-class brother Seymour arrives at the New York premiere of the film to demand that Sammy leave to see their mother for the anniversary of the death of their father; Sammy refuses. Laurette is impressed that Sammy's callousness is on a level with hers ("You’re No Good").

Back in Hollywood, Kit is startled and disgruntled when she discovers Sammy's plan to get her to write for him. Al and Kit reluctantly write a series of films for Sammy. Laurette is now attracted to Sammy, but he plays hard-to-get ("The Friendliest Thing"). Sidney's production unit is failing, and Sammy will not assist him. Harrington fires Sidney.

Sammy has clawed his way to the top of the studio. At his ostentatious mansion, Sammy and Laurette present the "Wedding of the Year". At the ceremony, they learn that Sidney has committed suicide. Everyone is shaken; Kit and Al, Sammy's only friends, are so disgusted that they finally break away from him and flee Los Angeles.

When Sammy discovers Laurette in bed with a young French movie star, his wife comments that he cannot do anything about it, or Harrington will dismiss him. Sammy knows: "Some Days Everything Goes Wrong".

== Musical numbers ==
Act I

- A New Pair of Shoes – Sammy Glick, Al Manhaim and Ensemble
- You Help Me – Sammy and Al
- A Tender Spot – Kit Sargent
- Lights! Camera! Platitude! – Sammy, Kit and Al
- My Hometown – Sammy
- Monsoon – Rita Rio, Tracy Clark and Ensemble
- I See Something – Laurette Harrington and Sammy
- Maybe Some Other Time – Kit and Al
- You Can Trust Me – Sammy
- A Room Without Windows – Kit and Sammy
- Kiss Me No Kisses – Kit and Sammy

Act II

- I Feel Humble – Sammy, Sheik Orsini and Ensemble
- Something to Live For – Kit
- Paint a Rainbow – Rita, Tracy and Ensemble
- You're No Good – Laurette and Sammy
- Something to Live For (reprise) – Al
- My Hometown (reprise) – Sammy
- The Friendliest Thing – Laurette
- Wedding of the Year – Ensemble
- Some Days Everything Goes Wrong – Sammy

== Awards and nominations ==
=== Original Broadway production ===
Year	Award	Category	Nominee	Result
1964	Tony Award	Best Actor in a Musical	Steve Lawrence	Nominated
1964	Tony Award	Best Conductor and Musical Director	Lehman Engel	Nominated
