= What Makes Sammy Run? =

1941 novel by Budd Schulberg

- First edition of What Makes Sammy Run?
- Author: Budd Schulberg
- Language: English
- Publisher: Random House
- Publication date: 1941
- Publication place: United States
- Media type: Print (octavo hardcover)
- Pages: 303 (first edition)

What Makes Sammy Run? (1941) is a novel by Budd Schulberg inspired by the life of his father, early Hollywood mogul B. P. Schulberg. It is a rags to riches story chronicling the rise and fall of Sammy Glick, a Jewish boy born in New York's Lower East Side who, very early in his life, makes up his mind to escape the ghetto and climb the ladder of success by deception and betrayal. It was made into a 1965 Broadway musical.

== Plot summary ==
Told in first person narrative by Al Manheim, drama critic of The New York Record, this is the tale of Sammy Glick, an uneducated young man who rises from copyboy to the top of the screenwriting profession in 1930s Hollywood by backstabbing others.

Manheim recalls how he first met the 16-year-old Sammy Glick when Sammy was working as a copyboy at Manheim's newspaper. Both awed and disturbed by Sammy's aggressive personality, Manheim becomes Sammy's primary observer, mentor and, as Sammy asserts numerous times, best friend.

Tasked with taking Manheim's column down to the printing room, one day Glick rewrites Manheim's column, impressing the managing editor and gaining a column of his own. Later he steals a piece by an aspiring young writer, Julian Blumberg, sending it under his own name to the famous Hollywood talent agent Myron Selznick. Glick sells the piece, Girl Steals Boy, for $10,000 and leaves the paper to go to work in Hollywood, leaving behind his girlfriend, Rosalie Goldbaum. When the film of Girl Steals Boy opens, Sammy is credited for "original screenplay" and Blumberg is not acknowledged.

Glick rises to the top in Hollywood over the succeeding years, paying Blumberg a small salary under the table to be his ghost writer. He even manages to have "his" stageplay, Live Wire, performed at the Hollywood Playhouse. Although the script is actually a case of plagiarism, The Front Page in flimsy disguise, no one except Manheim seems to notice. Sammy's bluffing also includes talking about books he has never read.

Manheim, whose ambitions are much more modest, is both fascinated and disgusted by the figure of Sammy Glick, and carefully chronicles his rise. In Hollywood, Manheim is disheartened to learn that Catherine "Kit" Sargent, a novelist and screenwriter he greatly admires, has fallen for Sammy's charms. Although Manheim is quite open about his feelings for Kit, she makes it clear she prefers Sammy, especially in bed. When she met Sammy, she told Manheim, she had "this crazy desire to know what it felt like to have all that driving ambition and frenzy and violence inside me."

Manheim also describes the Hollywood system in detail, as a money machine oppressive to talented writers. The bosses prefer to have carte blanche when dealing with their writers, ranging from having them work on a week-to-week basis to giving them a seven-year contract. In the film industry, Manheim remarks at one point in the novel, it is the rule rather than the exception that "convictions are for sale," with people double-crossing each other whenever the slightest chance presents itself to them. Hollywood, he notices, regularly and efficiently turns out three products: moving pictures, ambition, and fear. Manheim becomes an eyewitness to the birth of what was to become the Writers Guild, an organization created to protect the interests of the screenwriters.

After one of the studio's periodic reshufflings, Manheim finds himself out of work and goes back to New York. There, still preoccupied with Sammy Glick's rise to stardom, he investigates Sammy's past. He comes to understand, at least to some degree, "the machinery that turns out Sammy Glicks" and "the anarchy of the poor". Manheim realizes that Sammy grew up in the "dog-eat-dog world" of New York's Lower East Side (Rivington Street), much like the more sophisticated dog-eat-dog world of Hollywood. The one connection between Sammy's childhood days and his present position seems to be Sheik, someone who went to school with Sammy and regularly beat him up. Now Sheik is working as Glick's personal servant (or quasi-slave)—possibly some kind of belated act of revenge on Sammy's part, or the "victim's triumph".

When Manheim returns to Hollywood he becomes one of Glick's writers. There he realizes that there is also a small minority of honorable men working in pictures, especially producer Sidney Fineman, Glick's boss. Manheim teams up with Kit Sargent to write several films for Glick, who has successfully switched to production and moved into a gigantic manor in Beverly Hills.

Fineman's position becomes compromised by a string of flops, and Manheim attempts to convince Harrington, a Wall Street banker representing the film company's financiers, that Fineman is still the right man for the job. This is the moment when Glick sees his chance to get rid of Fineman altogether and take his place. At a reception, Glick meets Laurette, Harrington's daughter; he immediately and genuinely falls in love with this "golden girl," discarding his girlfriend. He feels that he is about to kill two birds with one stone by uniting his personal ambition and his love life.

Fineman, only 56, dies soon after losing his job to Sammy—of a broken heart, it is rumoured. Sammy's wedding is described by Manheim as "a marriage-to-end-all-marriages" staged in the beautiful setting of Sammy's estate. Manheim and Kit Sargent, who have finally decided to get married, slip away early to be by themselves. Sammy discovers Laurette making love in the guest room to Carter Judd, an actor Sammy has just hired. Laurette is not repentant: She coldbloodedly admits that she considers their marriage to be purely a business affair.

Sammy calls Manheim and asks him to come over to his place immediately. Once there, Manheim for the first time witnesses a self-conscious, desperate, and suffering Sammy Glick who cannot stand being alone in his big house. In the end, Sammy orders Sheik to get him a prostitute, while Manheim drives home.

== Analysis ==
The leitmotif of the novel, which is also expressed in the title, is Sammy's running. Sammy Glick is "running people down"; he is running "with death as the only finish line"; "without a single principle to slow him down"; "always thinking satisfaction is just around the bend." Manheim realizes that everybody is running, but that Sammy Glick is just running faster than the rest. Sammy's running is highly symbolic: he runs both literally and metaphorically. At one point, Manheim talks about Sammy's "undeclared war against the world", at another about Sammy Glick's Mein Kampf. Convinced that Jews should help each other, Manheim himself continuously tries to "revive the victims he left behind him as he kept hitting-and-running his way to the top". For example, he intervenes on Blumberg's behalf so that eventually his name appears in the credits.

== Reception and legacy ==
In Goldwyn: A Biography of the Man Behind the Myth (1976), Arthur Marx reveals that Samuel Goldwyn offered Schulberg money to not have it published because Goldwyn felt that the author was "doublecrossing the Jews" and perpetuating anti-Semitism by making Sammy Glick so venal. Schulberg told Ron Martinetti of American Legends website: "Sam Goldwyn didn't read the book, but was very hostile toward it. Louie Mayer tried to run me out of town. He hated the book. Mayer told my father he would ruin him for not stopping me from writing the novel." In his introduction to the 1990 reissue of the novel, Schulberg wrote, "Since Sammy is obviously Jewish, I thought it should be clear that nearly all his victims—Rosalie, Manheim, Blumberg, Fineman, his brother, Israel—were also Jewish, suggesting the wide range of personalities and attitudes under the one ethnic umbrella."

When Schulberg wrote the novel, he was a member of the Communist Party of the USA. High-ranking party member John Howard Lawson ordered Schulberg to make extensive changes to the novel to better fit Communist principles. Schulberg refused and quit the party in protest, and a decade later testified before the House Unamerican Activities Committee about Communist influence in Hollywood and to identify other party members.

When the book was published, there was much speculation that the character of Sammy Glick was based on producer Jerry Wald. Schulberg later admitted that Wald was one of his models, but "not the only one." In his book Competing With Idiots, writer Nick Davis points to his great-uncle Joseph L. Mankiewicz as another possible model for Glick: "Sammy Glick was a beautiful embodiment of all of [Hollywood's] most horrible characters rolled up into one hugely unsympathetic, grasping ball of ambition, who reminded more than one Hollywood reader of Joe."

== Dramatizations ==
- What Makes Sammy Run? was first dramatized as a live television drama starring José Ferrer on April 10, 1949, on The Philco Television Playhouse.
- On September 27 and October 4, 1959, on NBC Sunday Showcase, Larry Blyden starred as Sammy Glick in a two-part television broadcast on NBC-TV. John Forsythe played Al Manheim, Barbara Rush was Kit Sargent, and Dina Merrill was Laurette Harrington.
- On February 27, 1964, Steve Lawrence opened at the 54th Street Theatre in a Broadway musical version of What Makes Sammy Run? which ran for 540 performances, closing on June 12, 1965. Robert Alda played Al Manheim and Sally Ann Howes played Kit Sargent. The music and lyrics were by Ervin Drake and Budd Schulberg and his brother, Stuart Schulberg, wrote the book. Abe Burrows directed.
- A heavily revised revival of the musical opened on January 19, 2006, at the West End Theatre in New York City. Ervin Drake wrote several new songs and reinserted several songs that were not used in the 1964 production.
- The book has yet to be made into a theatrical film. In 1956, Fred Finklehoffe acquired the rights but these expired before he could make a film. In 1989, Budd Schulberg completed a screenplay of his 1941 novel, for director Sidney Lumet. According to a 2001 article in Variety, DreamWorks paid US$2.6 million to acquire the rights to the novel from Warner Brothers for a proposed movie version starring and/or directed by Ben Stiller, although production was never begun. Budd Schulberg, who died in 2009, told The Jewish Daily Forward in 2006 that he doubted that a film would ever be made, saying "I still think there's a sense that it's too anti-industry". In a 2009 newspaper interview, Schulberg quoted Steven Spielberg as saying that the book was "anti-Hollywood and should never be filmed".

== See also ==
- What Makes Sammy Run? (musical)
- Fiction about Hollywood
- Louis B. Mayer
- Classical Hollywood cinema
