= Dylan (play) =

- Written by: Sidney Michaels
- Based on: Dylan Thomas in America by John Malcolm Brinnin Leftover Life to Kill by Caitlin Thomas

Premiere
- Date: January 18, 1964
- Place: Plymouth Theatre, New York City
- Directed by: Peter Glenville
- Original run: Jan 18, 1964 -Sep 12, 1964

Dylan is a 1964 play by Sidney Michaels.

== Production ==
Dylan is based on the books Dylan Thomas in America (1956) by John Malcolm Brinnin and Leftover Life to Kill (1957) by Caitlin Thomas. The play covers the final years of Welsh poet Dylan Thomas' life.

At the 18th Tony Awards, Dylan was nominated for Best Play, and earned Alec Guinness (in the title role) the award for best performance. He was also awarded the Delia Austrian medal for his role. The play was recorded and released by Columbia Masterworks.

== Awards and nominations ==
=== Original Broadway production ===
Year	Award	Category	Nominee	Result
1964	Tony Award	Best Play		Nominated
1964	Tony Award	Best Actor in a Play	Alec Guinness	Won
1964	Tony Award	Best Featured Actress in a Play	Kate Reid	Nominated
1964	Tony Award	Best Producer	George W. George and Frank Granat	Nominated
