= Dr. Loveless =

Fictional character

Dr. Miguelito Quixote Loveless
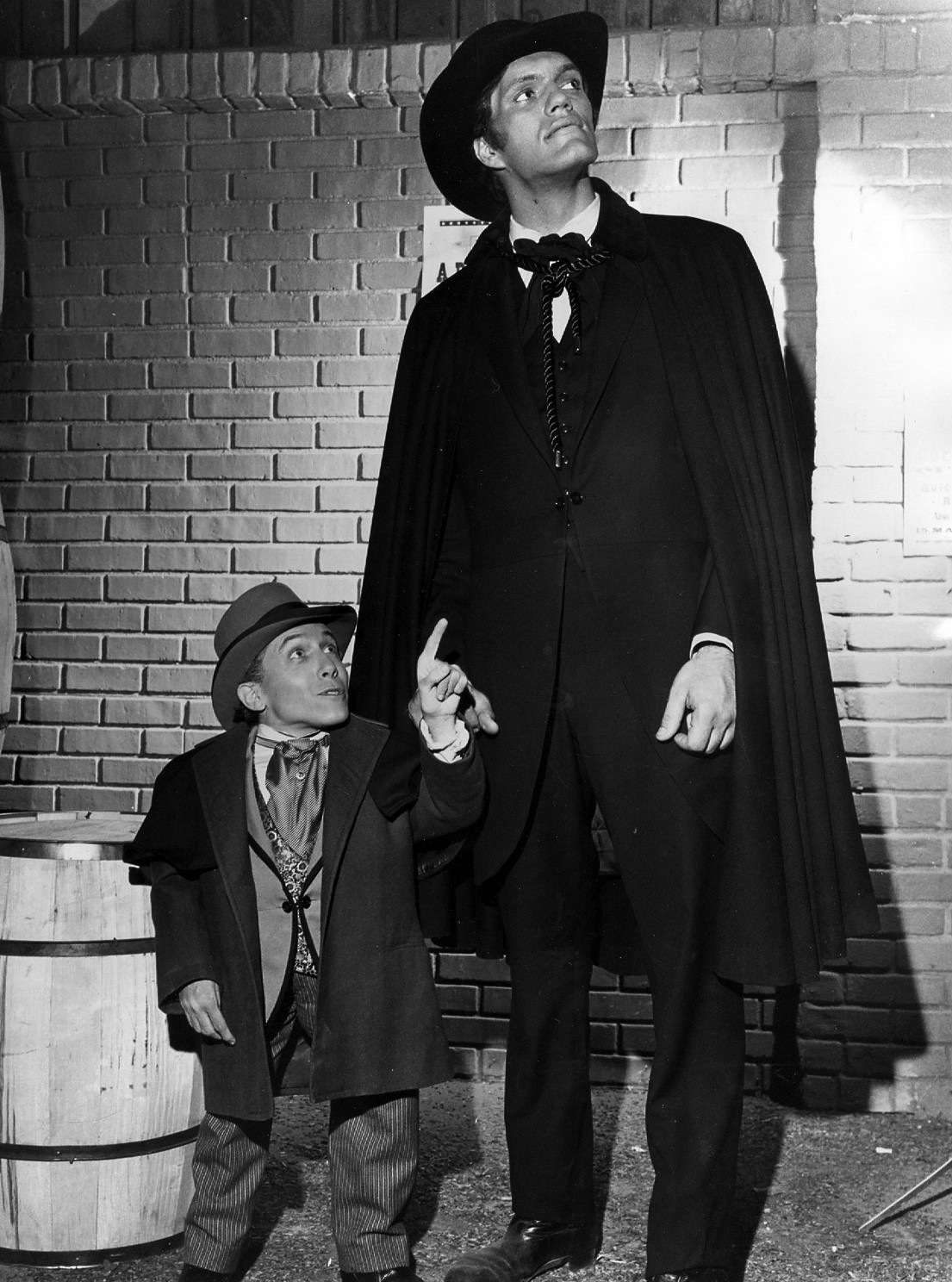
- Michael Dunn as Dr. Loveless (left) with Voltaire (Richard Kiel).
- First appearance: "The Night the Wizard Shook the Earth"
- Last appearance: "The Night of Miguelito's Revenge"; The Wild Wild West
- Created by: John Kneubuhl; S. S. Wilson; Brent Maddock; Jeffrey Price; Peter S. Seaman; Jim Thomas; John Thomas
- Portrayed by: Michael Dunn (1965–1969)(The Wild Wild West); Kenneth Branagh (Wild Wild West)

In-universe information
- Alias: Dr. Loveless
- Gender: Male
- Occupation: Mad scientist
- Nationality: American

Dr. Miguelito Quixote Loveless is a fictional character who appeared as the primary antagonist of ten episodes of the 1960s western action television series The Wild Wild West. Portrayed by Michael Dunn, he is a brilliant mad scientist born with dwarfism. Throughout the television series, Dr. Loveless conceived numerous plots which were always foiled by Secret Service agents James West and Artemus Gordon.

== Overview ==
Loveless' family had received a valuable land grant in California from the Spanish Viceroy of Mexico. Their land was taken back by the Spanish Crown, and then irretrievably lost when California became part of the United States. His original goal was to recover his family's property and create a haven where the disadvantaged (presumably financially and, like himself, physically) could live without torment from society. As the series progressed, however, he became more and more megalomaniacal. West is able to defeat Loveless by using Loveless' own ego against him. In "The Night of the Bogus Bandits", it is revealed that Loveless' greatest fear is not death, but the fact that once deceased, he cannot continue his plans of revenge against a society which he hates so much. Despite his size Loveless can defeat larger persons than himself with the aid of a walking stick, ("The Night the Wizard Shook the Earth").

Loveless was known as a technological genius who produced gadgets far ahead of his time—which his archenemy James West acknowledges ("The Night Dr. Loveless Died"). In the series' first season, his inventions were more practical, anticipating the cathode-ray tube, the airplane, penicillin, automobile ("The Night the Wizard Shook the Earth") and a synthesized LSD-like hallucinogen. In the second season, the inventions became more fantastic and included a powder that shrank Jim West to one-twelfth his original size, and a device that allowed people to enter paintings. Perhaps the most phantasmagorical of his methods for avoiding capture was when he and his assistant Antoinette (Phoebe Dorin) escaped West and Gordon by shrinking themselves and flying away on the back of a swan ("The Night of the Raven"). In one episode Dunn did a parody of a fanatical film director while he "rehearsed" crimes ("The Night of the Bogus Bandits"). In the last episode in which he appeared, Dr. Loveless (who is addicted to the very rare Napoleon Brandy, Le Grande) escaped by using a circus cannon to shoot himself into space; the only trace of him is his circus ringmasters uniform on the ground along with a recording promising West that they will meet again ("The Night of Miguelito's Revenge").

According to the 1979 television film The Wild Wild West Revisited, in 1880, Loveless eventually died of ulcers resulting from anger and frustration at having his plans consistently ruined by West and Gordon, while in reality his actor, Michael Dunn, died in 1973. As a result, his son Dr Dr. Miguelito Quixote Loveless Jr (played by Paul Williams) and daughter Carmelita Loveless (Jo Ann Harris) subsequently seek revenge on the agents.

== Appearances ==
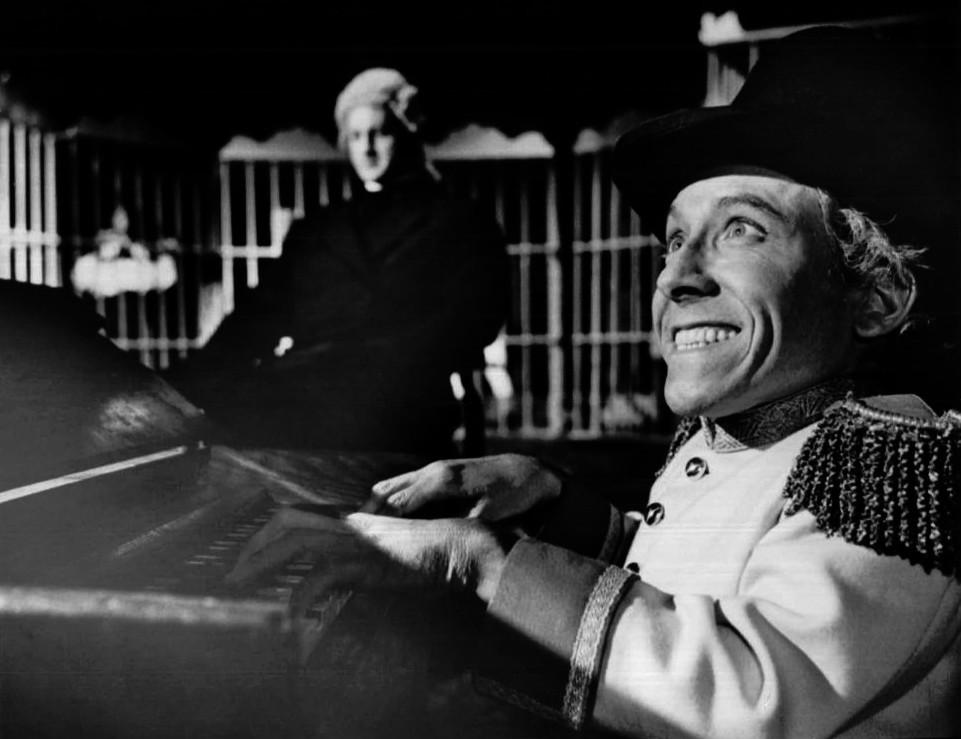
Michael Dunn's last appearance as Dr. Loveless in "The Night of Miguelito's Revenge" showing Loveless's newest invention—an android.

Loveless was created by writer John Kneubuhl after he read a magazine article about Dunn. The character was introduced in the 1965 episode "The Night the Wizard Shook The Earth", which was the show's third televised episode (although it was produced as the sixth). Loveless became an immediate hit and Dunn appeared in ten episodes over four seasons, with Kneubuhl writing five of them. Dunn was contracted to appear in four episodes per season, but due to health problems he only appeared in 10 episodes instead of 16. (Loveless was captured by West and Gordon only in the first three episodes he appeared in; a running gag for the subsequent seven episodes is that while his plans are defeated by West and Gordon, Loveless has a prearranged escape plan)

- "The Night the Wizard Shook the Earth" – Episode #3
- "The Night That Terror Stalked the Town" – Episode #10
- "The Night of the Whirring Death" – Episode #20
- "The Night of the Murderous Spring" – Episode #27
- "The Night of the Raven" – Episode #31
- "The Night of the Green Terror" – Episode #38
- "The Night of the Surreal McCoy" – Episode #51
- "The Night of the Bogus Bandits" – Episode #56
- "The Night Dr. Loveless Died" – Episode #60
- "The Night of Miguelito's Revenge" – Episode #92

== Accomplices ==
Dr. Loveless initially had two companions: the hulking mute Voltaire (played by real-life giant Richard Kiel) and the beautiful songstress Antoinette (portrayed by Dunn's nightclub-act singing partner, Phoebe Dorin). Voltaire disappeared after the doctor's third encounter with the agents; Antoinette, after the sixth. However, they each left such an indelible impression on fans that the 1990 comic book miniseries from Millennium Publications, a sequel to the TV series scripted by Mark Ellis with art by Darryl Banks, included both characters.

== 1979 The Wild Wild West Revisited MFTV reunion movie ==
In 1979 MFTV reunion movie the late Michael Dunn was replaced by Paul Williams as Dr. Miguelito Loveless, Jr. source: IMDb

== Film counterpart ==
Renamed Dr. Arliss Loveless, he appeared in the 1999 film adaptation Wild Wild West, played by Kenneth Branagh and featuring several major changes from his original television counterpart. For instance, Branagh's Loveless was a former Confederate military engineer who had lost his lower body in an accidental explosion. So, he used a steam-powered wheelchair in order to move around and created similar innovative contraptions. Loveless was incensed at the South's surrender and sought to dismember the United States and distribute its territory among the Native American tribes and its original European colonizers (while keeping the Northern Plains for himself, which he would rename "Loveless Land"). He also has a personal history/feud with Jim West; a prototype tank he designed massacred the population of a freed slave colony, including West's parents (in the film, West, portrayed by Will Smith, is African-American as opposed to being white in the original television series).

This version of the character was criticized by Robert Conrad who found the changes unnecessary. Branagh himself joked that he despised the accent he spoke with in the film.
