= Michael Dunn (actor) =

American actor with dwarfism (1934–1973)

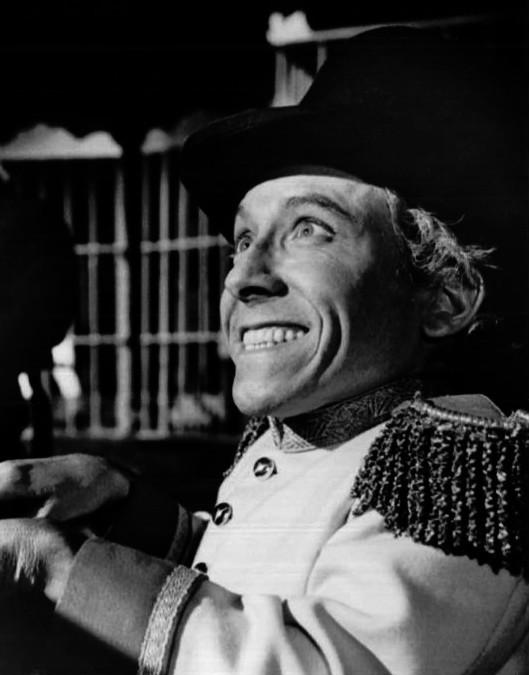
- Dunn as Dr. Loveless in The Wild Wild West (1968)
- Born: Gary Neil Miller; October 20, 1934; Shattuck, Oklahoma, U.S.
- Died: August 30, 1973 (aged 38); London, England
- Resting place: Norman, Oklahoma, U.S.
- Education: University of Michigan
- Occupations: Actor, singer
- Height: 1.17 m (3 ft 10 in)

Michael Dunn (born Gary Neil Miller; October 20, 1934 – August 30, 1973) was an American actor and singer with dwarfism. He was nominated for the Tony Award for Best Featured Actor in a Play for The Ballad of the Sad Café, and for the Academy Award for Best Supporting Actor in Stanley Kramer's Ship of Fools, but is best remembered for a recurring role as mad scientist Dr. Miguelito Quixote Loveless in the 1960s television adventure series The Wild Wild West. He inspired a number of later actors with dwarfism, including Zelda Rubinstein and Mark Povinelli.

== Medical condition ==
Dunn had medical dwarfism, a result of spondyloepiphyseal dysplasia (SED, subtype unknown), a genetic defect of cartilage production caused by a mutation in the COL2A1 (type II collagen) gene. This disorder, classified as a skeletal dysplasia, causes distorted development of the limbs, spine, and ribcage and leads to early, widespread osteoarthritis and constricted lung growth. As an adult, Dunn stood 3′ 10″ and weighed about 78 pounds (117 cm, 35.38 kg). During Dunn's lifetime, his condition was described by the nonspecific term "progressive chondrodystrophy", or alternatively as "achondroplasia", a term that now refers specifically to a skeletal dysplasia caused by a defect in the gene for fibroblast growth factor receptor 3.

== Early life ==
Dunn was born Gary Neil Miller in Shattuck, Oklahoma, to Jewell (née Hilly; 1905–1990) and Fred Miller (1906–1981) during the Dust Bowl drought. He chose his stage name to differentiate himself from another Gary Miller in the Screen Actors Guild. "Dunn" was his maternal grandmother's maiden name, but his reason for choosing "Michael" is unknown and not derived from his monastic experience in 1958. An only child, when he was four years old, his family moved to Dearborn, Michigan.

Dunn started reading at age three, was champion of the 1947 Detroit News Spelling Bee (representing Wallaceville School in Wayne County), and showed early skill at the piano. He enjoyed singing from childhood, loved to draw an impromptu audience (even while waiting for a bus), and developed a pleasing lyric baritone and superb sight-reading skills. His parents defied pressure from school authorities to sequester him in a school for disabled children and staunchly supported his talents, independence, and integration into mainstream society. "I always got thrown out of classes for being too lippy", he commented about his experience with elementary school teachers. "I'd read more than they." His orthopedic condition greatly limited his mobility, but he swam and ice-skated in childhood and remained a skilled swimmer throughout his life.

== Education ==
Dunn attended Redford High School in Detroit (1947–1951), then entered the University of Michigan in Ann Arbor in September 1951, just before his 17th birthday. However, according to his Columbia Studios press kit biography, his studies were interrupted when he was knocked down a flight of stairs during a "student rush", which resulted in a three-month hospital stay.

In 1953, he transferred to the University of Miami, College of Arts and Sciences, which offered a better climate and more accessible campus. His transcript shows that, despite scoring at the 97th percentile of ACE placement exams and the 99th percentile of the CTS English test, he did not distinguish himself academically. However, he was a high spirited and well-known figure about campus who sang in the talent show and facetiously joined the football cheerleading squad. Archives at that university's Otto G. Richter Library show that he became first a copyeditor and a contributing writer, then managing editor in 1954 of the college magazine, Tempo. (Contrary to information that later appeared in his Columbia Studios biography, Dunn could not take credit for Tempo winning the Sigma Delta Chi Award for best college magazine in the country, since credit went to the Editor-in-Chief.) His classmate John Softness recalled, "He could sing like an angel, and he could act and he could write and he was a brilliant raconteur." Softness ran a campus-wide advertising campaign called "Wheels for Gary", which brought in enough money from student donations to buy a used 1951 Austin outfitted with hand controls, so that Dunn could get around independently.

At various points, he held different odd jobs—singing in a nightclub, answering telephones for the Miami Daily News, and working as a hotel detective. ("What a gaff! I got my room free and all I did was play cards with the night clerk and keep an eye open for any funny business in the lobby. Who would ever suspect me of being a detective?") He left college in 1956 after completing only his sophomore year, returned to Michigan, and attended summer classes at the University of Detroit in 1957.

== Religion ==
Dunn converted to Catholicism and was baptized in 1954. He was living in Ann Arbor with his parents, working as a professional singer, at the time he entered St. Bonaventure Monastery in Detroit, on February 25, 1958.

According to a Capuchin Provincial Archivist, Dunn entered with the intention of becoming a Capuchin non-ordained Brother. He was known by his given name, Gary, since he never became a novice. A testimonial from John F. Bradley, Catholic Chaplain, University of Michigan, states: "He has always been interested in Catholic activities and was president of the Newman Club in another school". In response to a question on the monastery application asking: "How long have you been thinking of entering religious life?" Dunn wrote, "More than three years." Dunn was later quoted in the New York Post explaining that he had wanted to be of service, since he was unfit for the military: "Everyone my age was going to Korea and I had this feeling that singing wasn't exactly doing my part."

However, monastery records entered by the Master of Novices show that the physical demands of monastic life in a huge, 19th-century building with no elevator proved too strenuous. Dunn left of his own accord on May 8, 1958, to pursue a stage career in New York.

== Career ==
In New York, Dunn re-encountered Softness, who volunteered to be his manager. In the early 1960s, he befriended actress Phoebe Dorin when they both had small parts in an off-Broadway show, Two by Saroyan. They began singing together casually after their nighttime performances, sitting on the wall of the fountain opposite the Plaza Hotel, and drew a following. Eventually, on the advice of fellow actor Roddy McDowall, the pair started a nightclub act of songs mixed with conversational patter, titled "Michael Dunn and Phoebe". The act received favorable reviews in Time magazine and The New York Times and ultimately led directly to the pair being cast on the television series The Wild Wild West, a Western spy spoof with elements of historical fiction and science fiction, which debuted in 1965.

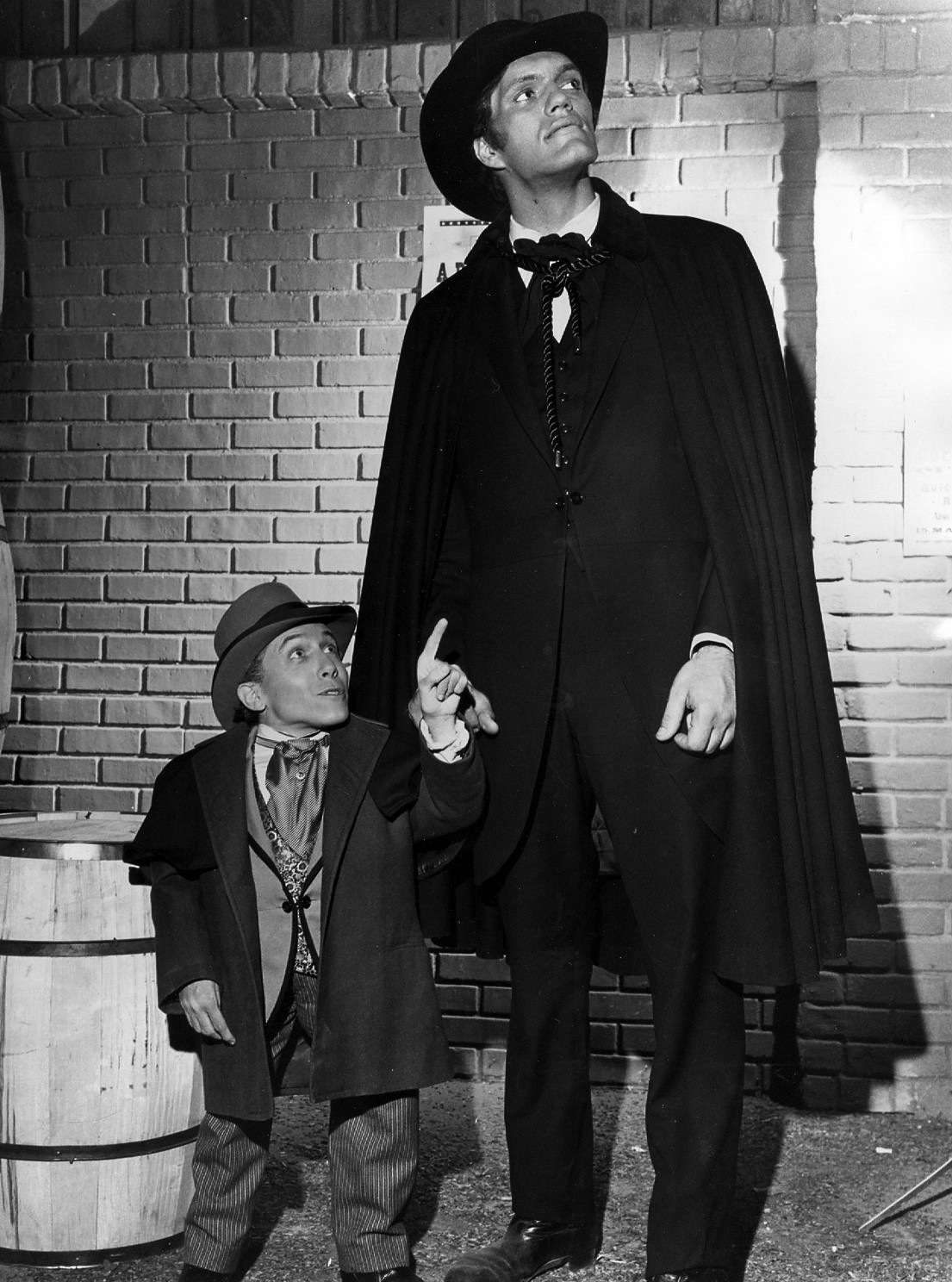
Dunn with Richard Kiel in The Wild Wild West, 1966

Dunn was probably best known for his recurring role on that series as Dr. Miguelito Loveless, a mad scientist who devised passionately perverse schemes and gadgetry to ensnare Secret Service agents James West and Artemus Gordon (Robert Conrad and Ross Martin). "Miguelito" is the Spanish diminutive of "Michael", equivalent to "Mike" or "Mikey". Dorin played Dr. Loveless's devoted assistant, Antoinette. In each of the six episodes in which they appeared together, the villainous couple tenderly sang a Victorian duet or two, heedless of the mayhem they had created around themselves. According to Dorin, Dunn saved her from drowning during filming of the episode "The Night of the Murderous Spring", plunging underwater to tear her free, when her costume became entangled in machinery used to sink a boat on the set. Dunn appeared as Dr. Loveless 10 times on the series—four times in each of the first two seasons, and one time in each of the remaining two seasons. Health problems prevented him from appearing in more.

Early in the 1965-66 television season Dunn was seen in the pilot episode of the spy spoof Get Smart, where he showed his skill with comic farce as the well-heeled gangster Mr. Big, leader of international crime organization K.A.O.S. (September 18, 1965). Later that year he made his first appearance as Dr. Loveless in "The Night the Wizard Shook the Earth" (October 1, 1965), and portrayed a villain who kidnaps an American cryptographer and offers him to the highest bidder in "The Prisoners of Mr. Sin" episode of Amos Burke: Secret Agent (October 27, 1965).

Dunn appeared as a killer clown in the Voyage to the Bottom of the Sea episode "The Wax Men" (5 March 1967), and was featured as Alexander, a courageous court jester, in the Star Trek episode "Plato's Stepchildren" (November 22, 1968). He also appeared in an episode of Bonanza, "It's a Small World" (January 4, 1970), portraying a recently widowed circus performer trying to start a new life.

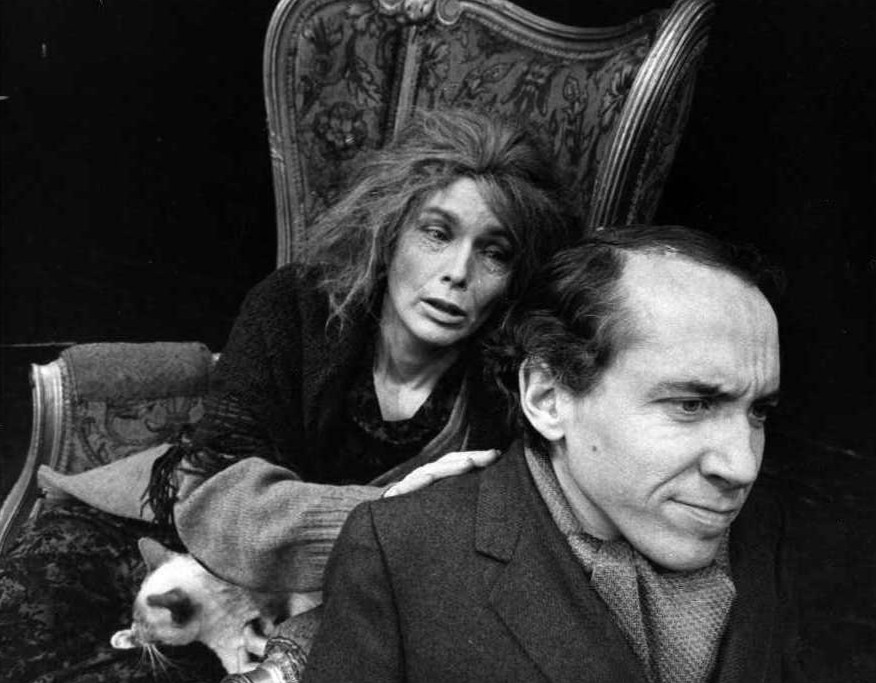
Dunn as Antaeus with Priscilla Pointer in The Inner Journey.

In 1963, he received the New York Drama Critics' Circle Award for best supporting actor and was nominated for a 1964 Tony Award, for his performance as Cousin Lymon in Edward Albee's stage adaptation of Carson McCullers' The Ballad of the Sad Café. Dunn received an Oscar nomination and the Laurel Award as the best supporting actor for his role as the cynical Karl Glocken in 1965's Ship of Fools, directed by Stanley Kramer).

In 1969, The New York Times drama critic Clive Barnes praised Dunn's portrayal of Antaeus in the tragedy The Inner Journey by British novelist and playwright James Hanley, performed at Lincoln Center: "Michael Dunn as the dwarf is so good that the play may be worth seeing merely for him. Controlled, with his heart turned inward, his mind a pattern of pain, Mr. Dunn's Antaeus deserves all the praise it can be given."

Between those career highlights, he accepted roles in many B-grade horror movies, as well as a role in the 1968 film No Way to Treat a Lady, starring Rod Steiger and George Segal. At the time of his death in 1973, he was in London filming Birgito in The Abdication, directed by Anthony Harvey, starring Peter Finch and Liv Ullmann. Author Günter Grass had already asked him to play in a film adaptation of his novel The Tin Drum, a role that ultimately went to the young David Bennent after Dunn's death.

== Personal life ==
Dunn married Joy Talbot, a former model with the John Robert Powers Agency, on December 14, 1966. The couple separated in April 1968 and the marriage ended in divorce soon after.

He was a philanthropist toward children with dwarfism, who would write fan letters to him confiding their loneliness and despair. According to Dorin, Dunn often traveled to visit such children at his own expense, delivering encouragement to them and stern counsel to overly protective parents.

His mobility and physical stamina were poor and deteriorated throughout his life. He had deformed hip joints (due either to hip dysplasia or coxa vara, with secondary osteoarthritis). However, he scampishly disguised his limitations by telling tall tales that a gullible press eagerly reported as the truth. Various accounts describe him as an aviator, skydiver, judo master, football player, and concert pianist, despite clear evidence on film of a severe, waddling limp, permanently flexed limbs, and gnarled fingers. In published interviews, he did hint at his childhood limitations both in football—"I was a great passer"—and in baseball: "I wasn't a very fast runner. I had to depend on sliding."

Working in New York, eschewing public transportation, Dunn reportedly accrued masses of parking tickets, as disabled drivers had no special privileges. He received help from friend and stuntman Dean Selmier, who often carried Dunn on his shoulders through the streets of Manhattan.

== Death ==
Spinal deformities, including scoliosis, caused a distorted ribcage that restricted Dunn's lung growth and function. The resulting respiratory insufficiency caused overload of the heart's right chambers, a chronic condition called cor pulmonale. He died in his sleep in his room at the Cadogan Hotel, Chelsea, London, on August 30, 1973, while on location for The Abdication. He was 38 years old.

The New York Times reported his cause of death as undisclosed, leading to decades of repeated public speculation about possible suicide. However, the designation "undisclosed" signified merely that no cause of death had yet been determined. An autopsy was performed on August 31, 1973, by Donald Teare at St George's Hospital, London, who noted: "The right side of the heart was widely dilated and hypertrophied to twice its normal thickness. The left ventricle was normal in size." He recorded the cause of death as cor pulmonale. This information is confirmed in the "Report of the Death of an American Citizen" from the U.S. Department of State, Foreign Service, American Embassy in London, made out on October 12, 1973, by Micaela A. Cella, Vice Consul. The report is on record in the U.S. National Archives in College Park, Maryland.

A London physician reportedly prescribed and administered two narcotics and a barbiturate for severe arthritic pain, despite the extreme risk of inducing respiratory depression, apnea, and death in a patient with decreased respiratory reserve. Dunn may have needed the drugs in order to tolerate the physical demands of shooting a movie. The autopsy's finding of intense vascular congestion in the lungs also suggests the possibility that a rapidly progressive pneumonia may have been developing.

Allegations of chronic alcoholism are unsubstantiated by the autopsy report, which notes only venous congestion of the liver, presumably secondary to Dunn's right-heart failure, without cirrhosis, and without inflammation of the stomach lining or pancreas. One consequence of such liver dysfunction would be jaundice. Another would be intoxication after drinking even small amounts of alcohol, as well as a toxic reaction to the prescribed drugs—either of which could also induce altered mental status (such as disorientation, delusions, faulty memory). This may explain the family's report that Dunn sent home a strange telegram "shortly before his death": "I'm OK. The cops are looking." Rumors of foul play and theft of the body are unsubstantiated by Scotland Yard.

Despite being severely ill and in great pain, Dunn continued working nearly up to the day of his death on August 30, 1973, living up to his own description of himself as "a both-feet jumper". Dunn was buried on September 10, 1973, in Lauderdale Memorial Park Cemetery, Fort Lauderdale, Florida, near his parents' retirement home in Lauderhill. In July 2007, a first cousin had his remains exhumed and driven to Oklahoma, re-interred near his parents' graves in Sunset Memorial Park Cemetery, Norman, Oklahoma.

== TV and filmography ==
Year	Date Aired	Series	Episode	Role	Notes
1962		Without Each Other	film	Dwarf	
1964	February 7	The Jack Paar Program	interview	guest	
1965	July 29	Ship of Fools	film	Karl Glocken	Nominated—Academy Award for Best Supporting Actor
1965	August 3	Today	(w/ Phoebe Dorin)	guest performer	
1965	September 18	Get Smart	pilot, "Mr. Big"	Mr. Big	
1965	October 1	The Wild Wild West	"The Night The Wizard Shook the Earth"	Dr. Miguelito Loveless	
1965	October 27	Amos Burke Secret Agent	"The Prisoners of Mr. Sin"	Mr. Sin	
1965	November 19	The Wild Wild West	"The Night That Terror Stalked the Town"	Dr. Miguelito Loveless	
1966	February 18	The Wild Wild West	"The Night of the Whirring Death"	Dr. Miguelito Loveless	
1966	April 15	The Wild Wild West	"The Night of the Murderous Spring"	Dr. Miguelito Loveless	
1966	September 6	Today	(w/ Phoebe Dorin)	guest performer	
1966	September 30	The Wild Wild West	"The Night of the Raven"	Dr. Miguelito Loveless	
1966	October 10	Run for Your Life	"The Dark Beyond the Door"	George Korval	
1966	November 18	The Wild Wild West	"The Night of the Green Terror"	Dr. Miguelito Loveless	
1966	December 9	You're a Big Boy Now	film	Richard Mudd	
1967	March 3	The Wild Wild West	"The Night of the Surreal McCoy"	Dr. Miguelito Loveless	
1967	March 5	Voyage to the Bottom of the Sea	"The Wax-Men"	clown	
1967	April 7	The Wild Wild West	"The Night of the Bogus Bandits"	Dr. Miguelito Loveless	
1967	September 29	The Wild Wild West	"The Night Dr. Loveless Died"	Dr. Miguelito Loveless	
1968	March 10	Madigan	"Castiglione"	Midget Castiglione	
1968	March 20	No Way to Treat a Lady	film	Mr. Kupperman	
1968	March 22	Tarzan	"Alex, the Great"	Amir	
1968	May 28	Boom!	film	Rudi	
1968	November 22	Star Trek	S3:E10, "Plato's Stepchildren"	Alexander	
1968	December 13	The Wild Wild West	"The Night of Miguelito's Revenge"	Dr. Miguelito Loveless	
1968	December 17	The Last Roman	film	Narses	
1969	June 11	Personality	interview	guest	
1970	January 4	Bonanza	"It's a Small World"	George Marshall	
1970	August 6	Justine	film	Mnemjian	
1970	August 20	The Tonight Show	interview	guest	
1970	September 15	Trop petit mon ami	film	Tiky Edriss	
1971	October 6	Murders in the Rue Morgue	Theatrical release	Pierre Triboulet	
1972	February 23	Night Gallery	"The Sins of the Fathers"	Servant	
1972	October 17	Goodnight, My Love	TV movie	Arthur Boyle	
1973	February 20	The Werewolf of Washington	Theatrical release	Dr. Kiss	
1974	February 19	Frankenstein's Castle of Freaks	Theatrical release	Genz	Posthumous credit, released in US in 1975
1974	September 9	House of the Damned	Theatrical release	Bodo	Posthumous release
1974	September 29	The Mutations	Theatrical release	Burns	Posthumous release
1974	December 5	The Abdication	film	The Dwarf	Final film role, posthumous release
2008	June 20	Get Smart film	Theatrical release	"wanted" poster of Everett "Mr. Big" Horton on refrigerator door	
2008	November 20	Man in the Mirror	DVD 2008, filmed between 1970 and 1972, restored and completed in 2007	Apple Joe	
