= Marathon '33 =

1963 play by June Havoc

Playbill

Marathon ‘33 is a play written by June Havoc which opened on December 22, 1963 and closed on February 1, 1964 at Anta Theatre. The play is based on June Havoc’s memoir Early Havoc and is based on her experience with dance marathons. The play is set in 1933 when dance marathon contests were a large part of the American zeitgeist, and was performed at the ANTA Washington Square Theatre. Although critics loved the play and it received high praise including a few Tony nominations, Marathon ‘33 was not a popular success and only ran for 48 performances. In the play, the character June and her partner Patsy join the dance marathons that were widespread during the Depression era. The stage of the play does not have a curtain and some of the cast members begin the play by being a part of the audience, adding to the sense of a real dance marathon. The play is similar to the movie They Shoot Horses, Don't They?, based on a book of the same name by Horace McCoy. Like the movie, the play provides a look into the harsh condition performers at marathons had to endure.

The play launched the career of actor Joe Don Baker.

== Background ==
Actor Julie Harris, who starred in a play with June Havoc and who played Havoc’s character in Marathon ‘33, read her memoir and inspired Havoc to write a play about the dance marathon era.

== Awards and nominations ==
Year	Ceremony	Category	Nominee
1964	Outer Critics Circle Award	Best Performance	Lee Allen
1964	Tony Awards	Best Direction of a Play	June Havoc
1964	Tony Awards	Best Performance by an Actor in a Featured Role in a Play	Lee Allen
1964	Tony Awards	Best Performance by an Actress in a Leading Role in a Play	Julie Harris

== Critical reception ==
In a review of the play in The New York Daily News, the play was described as a combination of various categories and ultimately most similar to a documentary of dance marathons in 1933. In the review, the play was described as a detailed representation of a chaotic time in American history during which starving and destitute people would do anything for food, fame, or entertainment. The reviewer recommended the play and casts the production as a glimpse into the lives of dance marathoners as well as the period of the Great Depression as a whole.

Other reviews include another New York Daily News review that wrote chock full of theatre—vivid, exciting, funny, touching, human and even horrifying theatre.” The New York Journal-American described it as big and brash,” and the New York World-Telegram & Sun wrote "sharp, poignant, comic, incredible but scrupulously honest.”

== Other productions ==
=== Guidhall School ===
Rachel Grunwald staged a production of Marathon ‘33 in 2013. The play ran from November 29 to December 4 at the Guildhall School of Music and Drama. The company comprised 26 acting students, along with a jazz band of six students. Grunwald described her aim in producing the play as portraying an era that resembles reality TV today and the harsh treatment of performers in the entertainment industry. To match the feeling of dance marathons, Grunwald’s production took place in a theater that transformed into an arena in which the audience became the audience of dance marathons. The posting for the play read “This is a Dance Marathon, an endurance test in which couples must dance perpetually, until one by one they succumb to exhaustion and madness, in a spectacle of cruelty rigged to keep audience members hooked and spending money. Eighty years on, in an era of reality TV and ‘poverty porn’, the Guildhall School presents the British premiere of this extraordinary, visceral show written by Canadian-born American actress and writer June Havoc.” Members of the creative team were Nicky Shaw (design), Mark Jonathan (lighting design), Ehud Freedman (music), Mikko Gordon (sound) and Emma Annetts (choreography).

In a review for The Guardian, critic Michael Billington praised Grunwald’s production for its design and originality. Billington, however, took issue with Grunwald’s thesis and wrote “I'm not sure I accept the implied parallel with the world of reality TV: even our sadism is surely not as great as that of the Depression-era spectators who watched dancers till they literally dropped.”

=== American Century Theater ===
The American Century Theater company produced a version of Marathon ‘33, which ran from July 27 to August 25, 2012, at the Gunston Theatre Two in Arlington, Virginia. The production design converted the theater into a dance hall style arena. The cast had 30 actors and a six piece jazz band, and during the play, there were comedy routines and song performances that resembled dance marathons of 1933. The play was produced by the company with the intention of comparing the Great Depression with the economy of the current period, while working with organizations associated with the local high school and the local retirement community.
