= Sidney Michaels =

American playwright

Sidney Michaels (August 17, 1927 – April 22, 2011, aged 83) was an American playwright best known for the early and mid 1960s works Tchin-Tchin, Dylan, and Ben Franklin in Paris.
