= The Ballad of the Sad Café (play) =

1963 stage play by Edward Albee

- Original language: English
- Written by: Edward Albee
- Genre: Drama
- Setting: Somewhere in the south. The Past and Present.

Premiere
- Date: October 28, 1963
- Place: Martin Beck Theatre

The Ballad of the Sad Café is a dramatic stage play with music written by American playwright Edward Albee, based on the 1951 novella of the same name written by Carson McCullers. The play premiered on Broadway at the Martin Beck Theatre in 1963. The play follows a woman named Amelia and her tumultuous relationship with her husband. The play was nominated for six Tony Awards including the Tony Award for Best Play.

== Production history ==
The play opened on Broadway at the Martin Beck Theatre on October 30, 1963, and closed on February 14, 1964 running a total of 123 performances. This was Edward Albee's second Broadway play and his follow up to Who's Afraid of Virginia Woolf? (1962). The play was directed by Alan Schneider. For her performance, Colleen Dewhurst was nominated for the Tony Award for Best Actress in a Play. The play also received nominations for Best Play, Best Producer, Best Featured Actor in a Play (Michael Dunn), and Best Scenic Design. The play includes original music composed by William Flanagan.

In 1977, the play was revived Off-Broadway at the WPA Theatre.

The play is available for licensing through Concord Theatricals.

== Original cast and characters ==
Character	Broadway (1963)
Amelia Evans	Colleen Dewhurst
Henry Macy	William Prince
Lyman	Michael Dunn
Marvin Macy	Lou Antonio
The Narrator	Roscoe Lee Browne
Emma Hale	Enid Markey
Stumpy MacPhail	John C. Becher
Mrs. Peterson	Jenny Egan
Merlie Ryan	Roberts Blossom

== Awards and nominations ==
=== Original Broadway production ===
Year	Award	Category	Nominee	Result
1964	Tony Award	Best Play		Nominated
1964	Tony Award	Best Actress in a Play	Colleen Dewhurst	Nominated
1964	Tony Award	Best Featured Actor in a Play	Michael Dunn	Nominated
1964	Tony Award	Best Direction of a Play	Alan Schneider	Nominated
1964	Tony Award	Best Costume Design	Ben Edwards	Nominated
1964	Tony Award	Best Producer	Lewis M. Allen and Ben Edwards	Nominated
