= List of The Wild Wild West episodes =

The cover of the DVD box set containing the complete run of The Wild Wild West.

The Wild Wild West is an American television series that ran on the CBS network from 1965 to 1969. During its four-season run a total of 104 episodes were broadcast. The Wild Wild West blended Westerns – hugely popular on television at the time (Gunsmoke, Bonanza, Wagon Train, Rawhide, etc.) – with spy adventure, which came into vogue in the wake of the highly successful James Bond films, resulting in such spy-oriented series as The Man from U.N.C.L.E., The Avengers and Secret Agent.

The Wild Wild West is set in the 1870s and deals with the exploits of James West (played by Robert Conrad) and Artemus Gordon (Ross Martin), two agents of the United States Secret Service who work directly under the command of President Ulysses S. Grant. James West is presented as a sort of "James Bond of the West," i.e. the handsome, muscular action-hero who is handy with his fists, as well as a dashing "ladies' man." Artemus Gordon is West's partner, a master of disguises and also the inventor of the many gadgets that the two of them use in the course of their adventures. The two men travel about in a private train and use their talents to vanquish the many dastardly villains that threatened the United States – among them, disgraced ex-soldiers seeking revenge against President Grant, power-hungry megalomaniacs, and mad scientists with their brilliant but diabolical inventions. The last group includes the recurring villain Dr. Miguelito Loveless, played by 3'11" Michael Dunn. As series producer Bruce Lansbury stated:

"Jim [West]'s world was one of two-faced villainy, male and female, countless 'Mickey Finns,' and needle-tipped baroque pinkie rings that put him to sleep even as he embraced their dispensers. There were inevitable trap doors, hotel walls that ground their victims to dust or revolved into lush Aubrey Beardsley settings next door, lethal chairs that tossed occupants skyward or alternatively dumped them into dank sewers that subterraneously crisscrossed countless cow towns of the period. And then there was that old Dutch sea captain, leaning in the corner of the swill-hole of a bar, who inexplicably winked at Jim as he entered ... Artemus, of course, in one of his thousand disguises."

Ten years after the series was cancelled a made-for-television revival movie, The Wild Wild West Revisited, aired and was successful enough to warrant a follow-up entitled More Wild Wild West (1980), thus bringing the total number of episodes up to 106. However, the movie was more campy compared to the serious tone of the television series. The death of Ross Martin in 1981 ended any plans for another film. In 1999, the theatrical film Wild Wild West, loosely based on the TV series, was released.

The complete run of the series is present below in broadcast order. Included are the episode titles, directors, writers, broadcast dates, production codes, guest stars and the roles they played, and a brief plot synopsis. Also, the various disguises that Ross Martin used in his Artemus Gordon character are listed.

== Series overview ==
Season	Episodes	Originally released	
Season	Episodes	First released	Last released
1	28	September 17, 1965	April 22, 1966
2	28	September 16, 1966	April 7, 1967
3	24	September 8, 1967	February 23, 1968
4	24	September 27, 1968	April 11, 1969
Television movies		May 9, 1979	October 8, 1980

== Episodes ==
=== Season 1 (1965–66) ===
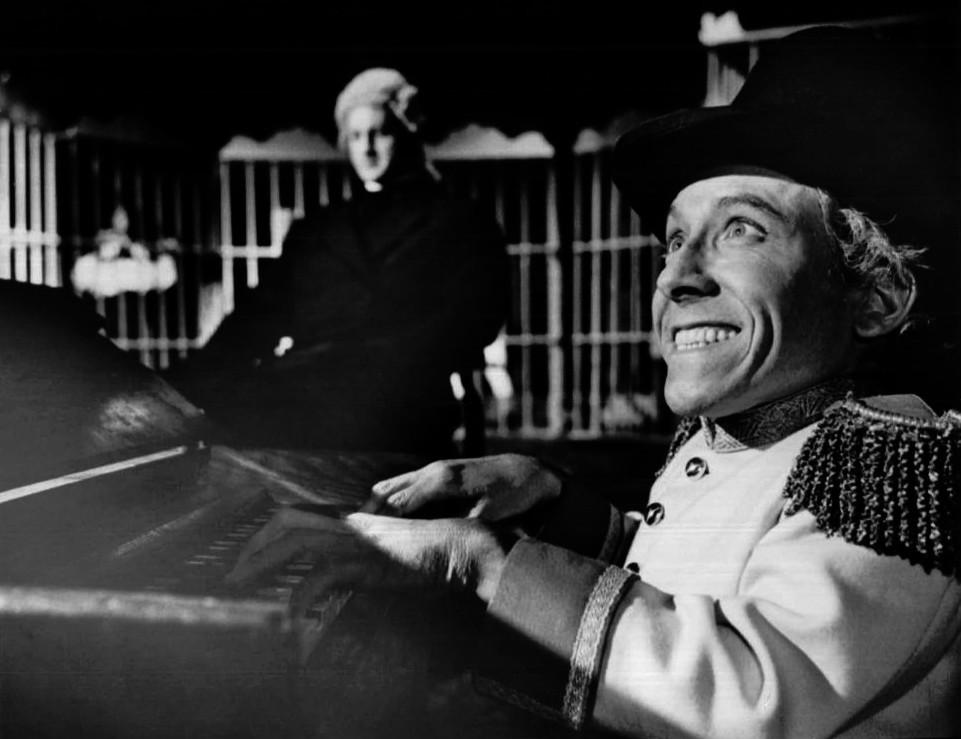
Michael Dunn's portrayed the brilliant but evil Dr. Loveless in ten episodes of The Wild Wild West. His last appearance as Dr. Loveless in "The Night of Miguelito's Revenge" showing Loveless's newest invention—an android.

The Wild Wild West was created by Michael Garrison, a movie producer (Peyton Place, The Long, Hot Summer, An Affair to Remember) who had, at one time, co-owned the rights to Ian Fleming's first James Bond novel, Casino Royale. Garrison produced the series pilot episode himself but, once the series was approved by the CBS network, it became necessary to find a more experienced producer to handle the subsequent episodes. Garrison, in the meantime, was moved into the position of Executive Producer.

Collier Young, who hitherto had produced a series entitled The Rogues, was assigned to The Wild Wild West but, after overseeing only three episodes, was replaced due to "a difference in concept between the network and [him]." Fred Freiberger, his replacement, brought the series back on track with adventures featuring beautiful women, strong adversaries, and "something very bizarre." Also under Freiberger the character of Dr. Loveless was created. Loveless became an immediate hit, resulting in actor Michael Dunn being contracted to do four episodes per season. However, after producing ten episodes, Fred Freiberger was replaced by John Mantley, reputedly due to a behind-the-scenes power struggle. Mantley, who had been associate producer on Gunsmoke, produced seven episodes before he too was replaced. Mantley returned to his former position on Gunsmoke while Gene L. Coon took over the production reins for of The Wild Wild West. However, Coon left after six episodes to take a screenwriting assignment at Warner Bros., leaving Michael Garrison to take on double-duty as producer and executive producer for the remainder of the season.

The 28 first-season episodes of The Wild Wild West, all of which were photographed in black and white, were not broadcast in the order that they were filmed. Notably, the early ones produced by Collier Young were moved back in the broadcast schedule in favor of the Fred Freiberger- and John Mantley-produced episodes. The breakdown in broadcast order is thus:

- Michael Garrison – Episodes 1 and 28
- Collier Young – Episodes 5, 9 and 15
- Fred Freiberger – Episodes 2–4, 6–8 and 10–13
- John Mantley – Episodes 14 and 16–21
- Gene L. Coon – Episodes 22–27

During this season, The Wild Wild West placed at #23 in the ratings for the 1965–1966 season. One episode of this season, "The Night of the Howling Light", received an Emmy nomination for Best Cinematography.

No.	Title	Directed by	Written by	Original release date	Prod. code	Artie's disguises
1	"The Night of the Inferno"	Richard C. Sarafian	Gilbert Ralston	September 17, 1965	5123–6525	A drunken soldier A poor Mexican beggar
Guest stars: Suzanne Pleshette (Lydia Monteran), Victor Buono (Juan Manolo/Wing Fat), Nehemiah Persoff (Juan Manolo/General Cassinello), Walter Woolf King (Colonel Shear), James Gregory (President Ulysses S. Grant), Bebe Louie (Mei Mei), Phil Chambers (Train Captain), Tom Reese (The Driver), Warren Parker (The Engineer), Clint Ritchie (The Lieutenant), Alberto Morin (The Majordomo) Posing as a rich eastern "dude" traveling west in his own private railway car, Jim goes to Texas to track down General Juan Manolo, who is trying to take over the region. This episode (the series' pilot) is formatted differently from all the other episodes of the series. It is the only episode that features the opening credits before the teaser, the only first season episode that features the commercial art break in a cartoon fashion (the remainder of the first season episodes featured them as a textured photograph), and the only episode to place a commercial art break in the bottom center picture. This is also the only episode to feature James Gregory as President Grant. It also shows a brief glimpse at the end of the episode of the train crew (engineer; fireman) and West's Butler. Villain: Juan Manolo/Wing Fat
2	"The Night of the Deadly Bed"	William Witney	George V. Schenck and William Marks	September 24, 1965	3224–0109	A Mexican peon
Guest stars: J. D. Cannon (Flory), Barbara Luna (Gatita), Don Diamond (Bartender), Danica d'Hondt (Roxanne), Anna Shin (Marguerita) West learns that a crazed assassin plans to reclaim Mexico and install himself as the new Napoleon. Villain: Flory
3	"The Night the Wizard Shook the Earth"	Bernard L. Kowalski	John Kneubuhl	October 1, 1965	3224–0110	(none)
Guest stars: Michael Dunn (Dr. Miguelito Loveless), Phoebe Dorin (Antoinette), William Mims (Governor), Harry Bartell (Professor Nielsen), Sigrid Valdis (Miss Piecemeal), Leslie Parrish (Greta), Richard Kiel (Voltaire), Michael Masters (Wrestler) West and Gordon have their first encounter with the brilliant but evil dwarf, Dr. Miguelito Loveless, along with the doctor's two conspirators/assistants, the lovely Antoinette and the mute, simple-minded giant, Voltaire. Dr. Loveless is planning to take over California from control of Governor Newton Booth, which the doctor claims rightfully belongs to him through his mother's venerable Ranchero family line.
4	"The Night of Sudden Death"	William Witney	Oliver Crawford	October 8, 1965	3224–0117	A clown
Guest stars: Robert Loggia (Warren Trevor), Joel Fluellen (Chief Vanoma), Bill Cassidy (Sterling), Don Gazzaniga (Hotel Clerk), Henry Hunter (Boone), Elisa Ingram (Cosette), Julie Payne (Corinne Foxx), Antoinette Bower (Janet Coburn), Sandy Kenyon (Hugo) West is on the trail of counterfeiters and almost gets to tangle with crocodiles. Villain: Warren Trevor
5	"Night of the Casual Killer"	Don Taylor	Bob Barbash	October 15, 1965	3224–0102	Actor, a hammy Artemus Gordon
Guest stars: John Dehner (John Avery), Ruta Lee (Laurie Morgan), Dub Taylor (Guard), Bill Williams (Marshal Kirby), Charles Davis (Tennyson), Curtis Taylor (Captain Davis), Ed Gilbert (Hendrix), Mort Mills (Harper), Len Lesser (Mason) Jim and Artemus head out west to find the stronghold of a corrupt political boss and return him to Washington, D.C. for trial. Villain: John Avery
6	"The Night of a Thousand Eyes"	Richard C. Sarafian	Preston Wood	October 22, 1965	3224–0119	A dapper gentleman
Guest stars: Jeff Corey (Captain Ansel Coffin), Linda Ho (Oriana), Victor French (Arnold), E. J. André (Proprietor), Donald O'Kelly (Poavey), Jeanne Vaughn (Glory), Janine Gray (Crystal), Barney Phillips (Captain Tenney), Jack Searl (Pilot), Diane McBain (Jennifer Wingate) When ships along the Mississippi River are attacked by a gang of pirates known as the "Thousand Eyes", Jim and Artemus are sent to investigate. The trail leads to the leader of the gang: Captain Ansel Coffin, a blind man seeking revenge. His gang uses false lights to lead ships astray, crash them, and then plunder them. Villain: Ansel Coffin
7	"The Night of the Glowing Corpse"	Irving J. Moore	Story by : Henry Sharp and Edmund Morris; Teleplay by : Henry Sharp	October 29, 1965	3224–0113	An Irish freight man
Guest stars: Oscar Beregi (Dr. Ormont), Kipp Hamilton (Cluny Ormont), Jayne Massey (Cecile), Louise Lawson (Blonde), Frank Delfino (Barker), Ron Whelan (Consul-General Potez), Marion Thompson (Amelie Charlemont), Charles Horvath (Ironfoot), Phillip E. Pine (Lt. Armand Renard) West and Gordon are assigned to recover stolen radioactive materials. Their only clue is a set of fingerprints found on the ankle of a comely but potentially lethal secretary. Villain: Cluny Ormont
8	"The Night of the Dancing Death"	Harvey Hart	William Tunberg and Fred Freiberger	November 5, 1965	3224–0118	The Grand Elector of Saxony
Guest stars: Peter Mark Richman (Prince Gio Carlotica), Eva Soreny (Baroness), Wolfe Barzell (Landgrave), Booth Colman (Perkins), Arthur Batanides (Marius Ascoli), Francoise Ruggieri (Nola), Byron Murron (Major-Domo), Leslie Brander (Princess Gina Carlotica), Lynn Carey (Imposter), Ilze Taurins (Marianna) Jim and Artie are assigned to rescue a kidnapped princess from the Camorra. Villain: Prince Gio Carlotica
9	"The Night of the Double-Edged Knife"	Don Taylor	Stephen Kandel	November 12, 1965	3224–0101	A tame Indian; A gentle old railroad worker A dead Indian
Guest stars: Katharine Ross (Sheila Parnell), Leslie Nielsen (General Ball), John Barrymore Jr. (American Knife), Elisha Cook Jr. (Mike McGreavy), Jackie Joseph (Girl at General Ball's Camp), Susan Silo (Little Willow), Ed Peck (Merritt), Tyler McVey (Parnell), Vaughn Taylor (Adamson), Harry Townes (Penrose), Charles Davis (Tennyson) Trouble is brewing along the railroad: the local Indians are demanding gold and have threatened to kill five railroad workers a day until it is paid. West and Gordon learn that things are not what they seem to be. Villain: General Ball
10	"The Night That Terror Stalked the Town"	Alvin Ganzer	Story by : John Kneubuhl and Richard Landau; Teleplay by : John Kneubuhl	November 19, 1965	3224–0123	(none)
Guest stars: Michael Dunn (Miguelito Loveless), Jean Hale (Marie), Phoebe Dorin (Antoinette), Joe Hooker (Mr. Abernathy), Jordan Shelley (Baron Colinelcy), Richard Kiel (Voltaire), Chuck O'Brien (Janus) The second encounter with Dr. Loveless. West is lured into a ghost town filled with lifelike dummies, where Loveless is hatching his latest scheme: the surgical alteration of Janus, one of his assistants. Once done, Janus would look exactly like James West. Villain: Dr. Miguelito Loveless
11	"The Night of the Red-Eyed Madmen"	Irving J. Moore	Stanford Whitmore	November 26, 1965	3224–0112	Colonel Cross, a German military expert
Guest stars: Martin Landau (General Grimm), Ray Kellogg (Captain O'Brien), Gregg Martell (Otto), Nelson Olmsted (Senator Rawls), Ted Markland (Jack Talbot), Marianna Case (Cloris), Shary Marshall (Jenny), Joan Huntington (Sgt. Musk) An army of fanatics is dedicated to overthrowing the United States Government, and it's up to James West to thwart their plans. Villain: General Grimm
12	"The Night of the Human Trigger"	Justus Addiss	Norman Katkov	December 3, 1965	3224–0128	Austrian Professor Neinindorf
Guest stars: Burgess Meredith (Professor Orkney Cadwallader), Kathie Browne (Faith Cadwallader), Michael Masters (Hercules Cadwallader), Dick Winslow (Piano Player), C. Lindsay Workman (Bartender), Gregg Palmer (Thaddeus Cadwallader), Bill Henry (Sheriff), Robert I. McCord (Sidney), Hank Patterson (Mr. Porter), Vernon Scott (Clerk), Virginia Sale (Aunt Martha), Robert Phillips (Sam), James Jeter (Harry) An insane geologist has developed an elaborate extortion scheme: He has mastered the power to create earthquakes. Villain: Professor Orkney Cadwallader
13	"The Night of the Torture Chamber"	Alan Crosland Jr.	Philip Saltzman and Jason Wingreen	December 10, 1965	3224–0114	Art critic Messr. Gaston LaRusse of the Sorbonne
Guest stars: Alfred Ryder (Professor Horatio Bolt), Henry Beckman (Governor Bradford/Sam Jameson), H. M. Wynant (Durand), Sigrid Valdis (Miss Piecemeal), Nadia Sanders (Helva), Viviane Ventura (Angelique) An obsessed museum curator has his own private designs for the state treasury. Villain: Professor Horatio Bolt
14	"The Night of the Howling Light"	Paul Wendkos	Henry Sharp	December 17, 1965	3224–0125	(none)
Guest stars: Sam Wanamaker (Dr. Arcularis), Linda Marsh (Indra), Dan Riss (Naval Officer), Ralph Moody (Ho-Tami), Kay E. Kuter (Caged Man), Roy Barcroft (Sikes), Clancy Cooper (Trowbridge), Ottola Nesmith (Maggie), E. J. André (Superintendent), Scott Marlowe (Ahkeema) Shades of The Manchurian Candidate: West is held prisoner in a lighthouse by a mad doctor who is using mind control to condition the Secret Service agent into becoming an assassin. Villain: Dr. Arcularis.
15	"The Night of the Fatal Trap"	Richard Whorf	Robert V. Barron and Jack Marlowe	December 24, 1965	3224–0104	Mojave Mike, a crusty desert rat
Guest stars: Ron Randell (Col. Francisco Vasquez), Joanna Moore (Linda Medford), Rodolfo Hoyos Jr. (Sgt. Gomez), Don Briggs (Sheriff Cantrell), Dal Jenkins (Luke Dawson), Alan Sues (Matt Dawson), Christian Anderson (Mark Dawson), Joseph Ruskin (Viper Black), Walker Edmiston (Charlie), Charles Davis (Tennyson) While disguised as a notorious outlaw, West goes to arrest a Mexican bandit, only to be recognized by the villain's girlfriend. Villain: Col. Francisco Vasquez
16	"The Night of the Steel Assassin"	Lee H. Katzin	Story by : Steve Fisher; Teleplay by : Calvin Clements	January 7, 1966	3224–0166	President Grant
Guest stars: John Dehner (Colonel "Iron Man" Torres), Sue Ane Langdon (Nina Gilbert), Roy Engel (President Grant), John Pickard (R.L. Gilbert), Sara Taft (Maria), Allen Jaffe (Lopez), Arthur Malet (Dr. Meyer), S. John Launer (Mayor), Phyllis Davis (Saloon Girl) After being crippled in an explosion that he blamed on the other men of his regiment, Colonel "Iron Man" Torres has rebuilt himself as a 19th century "cyborg". He is now seeking revenge on those whom he believes wronged him – including President Grant.
17	"The Night the Dragon Screamed"	Irving J. Moore	Kevin De Courcey	January 14, 1966	3224–0168	A coolie on the docks Gen. Sumatra, an armaments expert
Guest stars: Ben Wright (Col. Allenby-Smythe), Nancy Hsueh (Tsu Hsi), Benson Fong (Mo Ti), Richard Loo (Wang Chung), Paul King (Oriental), Beulah Quo (May Li), Vince Eder (Lieutenant), Pilar Seurat (Princess Ching Ling), Philip Ahn (Quong Chu) West and Artemus are tracking down the smugglers of opium and Chinese aliens. Their trail leads them to a British ex-colonel who is planning to take over the Chinese throne. Main Villain: Col. Allenby-Smythe
18	"The Night of the Flaming Ghost"	Lee H. Katzin	Robert Hamner and Preston Wood	January 21, 1966	3224–0167	Drunken whiskey salesman R.P. McGuffey; A cavalry soldier
Guest stars: John Doucette (John Obediah Brown), Robert Ellenstein (Luis Vasquez), Lynn Loring (Carma Vasquez), Karen Sharpe (Barbara Bosley), Charles Wagenheim (Shukie Summers), Harry Bartell (Will Glover) Abolitionist John Brown appears to have returned from the grave after being hung by the neck. West and Artemus are assigned to bring him in.
19	"The Night of the Grand Emir"	Irving J. Moore	Donn Mullally	January 28, 1966	3224–0169	Sheik Hokar, a minister of the Emir
Guest stars: Yvonne Craig (Ecstasy LaJoie), Richard Jaeckel (Christopher Cable), Robert Middleton (Emir El Emid), Arlene Charles (Emid #1 Girl), Phyllis Davis (Emid #2 Girl), Don Francks (T. Wiggett Jones), Arthur Gould-Porter (George), James Lanphier (Dr. Mohammed Bey) West is assigned to protect a visiting despot from Ecstasy La Joie, an assassin armed with a deadly ring and an explosive garter.
20	"The Night of the Whirring Death"	Mark Rydell	Story by : Jackson Gillis and Leigh Chapman; Teleplay by : Jackson Gillis	February 18, 1966	3224–0170	Opera singer Caruso del Artemo
Guest stars: Michael Dunn (Dr. Miguelito Loveless), Pamela Austin (Priscilla Ames), Barbara Nichols (Bessie Bowen), Phoebe Dorin (Antoinette), Val Avery (John Crane), Norman Fell (Jeremiah Ratch), Richard Kiel (Voltaire), Jesse White (Governor Lewis), Jason Wingreen (Policeman), Sam Flint (Clerk), Chanin Hale (Flo), Richard Reeves (Bailey), Elena Martone (Hostess) The third encounter with Dr. Loveless. This time, he is using exploding toys as part of his scheme to make California a kingdom for children, with himself as Governor.
21	"The Night of the Puppeteer"	Irving J. Moore	Henry Sharp	February 25, 1966	3224–0172	(none)
Guest stars: Lloyd Bochner (Zachariah Skull), Imelda de Martin (Vivid), John Hoyt (Justice Vincent Chayne), Janis Hansen (Waitress), Wayne Albritton (Harlequin), Walter Painter (Caveman), Jack Tygett (Butler), Len Rogel (Sign Man), Sara Taft (Mrs. Chayne), Nelson Olmsted (Dr. Lake) An attack on a Supreme Court justice leads West and Gordon into a mysterious underground lair filled with deadly life-size marionettes. Villain: Zachariah Skull
22	"The Night of the Bars of Hell"	Richard Donner	Robert Vincent Wright	March 4, 1966	3224–0171	A street preacher Jeremiah P. Threadneedle, dealer in ladies' corsets Aged prison executioner
Guest stars: Arthur O'Connell (Theophilus Ragan), Indus Arthur (Jennifer McCoy), Elisha Cook Jr. (Gideon McCoy), Mickey Golden (Gate Guard), Russ McCubbin (Mr. Quincannon), Whitey Hughes (Prison Guard), Roy Sickner (Driscoll), Paul Genge (Kross), Robert Herron (Borg), Jeni Jackson (Kitten), Milton Parsons (Executioner), Chet Stratton (Adams), Shawn Michaels (Convict Painter) West and Gordon are assigned to track down a band of outlaws who have centered their operations near a territorial prison. Villain: Theophilus Ragan
23	"The Night of the Two-Legged Buffalo"	Edward Dein	John Kneubuhl	March 11, 1966	3224–0173	A Hawaiian prince
Guest stars: Nick Adams (Prince), Dana Wynter (Lady Beatrice Marquand-Gaynesford), Robert Emhardt (Claude Duchamps), Paul Comi (Vittorio Pellagrini), Clint Ritchie (1st Bandit) West and Gordon are assigned to protect a pleasure-loving prince who is visiting the United States. The prince insists on visiting a plush spa, only to find that assassins are eagerly awaiting his arrival.
24	"The Night of the Druid's Blood"	Ralph Senensky	Story by : Kevin De Courcey; Teleplay by : Henry Sharp	March 25, 1966	3224–0175	(none)
Guest stars: Sam Wade (Robert Perry), Rhys Williams (Dr. Tristam), Don Rickles (Asmodeus), Ann Elder (Astarte), Emanuel Thomas (Butler), Don Beddoe (Professor Robey), Simon Scott (Colonel Fairchild), Bartlett Robinson (Senator Clay Waterford), Susan Browning (Nurse) West investigates the connection between a beautiful young woman; evil magicians and the deaths of several distinguished scientists.
25	"The Night of the Freebooters"	Edward Dein	Gene L. Coon	April 1, 1966	3224–0179	Col. Hernandez del Valle Santiago y Sandoval; Old lady running a cantina
Guest stars: Keenan Wynn (Thorald Wolfe), Maggie Thrett (Rita Leon), William Campbell (Bender), James Connell (Richard Henry), James Gammon (Egan), Robert Matek (Oldfield) While posing as an ex-con, Jim infiltrates a renegade army. Villain: Thorald Wolfe
26	"The Night of the Burning Diamond"	Irving J. Moore	Ken Kolb	April 8, 1966	3224–0176	Count Baron Felix von Schlesweig und Holtzbergen
Guest stars: Robert Drivas (Morgan Midas), Christiane Schmidtmer (Lucretia Ivronin), Vito Carbonara (Serbian Minister), Whitey Hughes (Rudd), Calvin Brown (Clive), Chuck O'Brien (Serbian Guard), Dan Tobin (Thaddeus Baines) West and Gordon investigate the mysterious disappearance of Serbia's Kara Diamond, which leads them into the lair of Morgan Midas. He has mastered a formula that can make him move so quickly that he becomes invisible to the naked eye. Gene L. Coon later used this idea for a 1969 Star Trek episode "Wink of an Eye".
27	"The Night of the Murderous Spring"	Richard Donner	John Kneubuhl	April 15, 1966	3224–0178	(none)
Guest stars: Michael Dunn (Dr. Miguelito Loveless), Phoebe Dorin (Antoinette), Jenie Jackson (Kitten Twitty), Leonard Falk (Attendant) West and Gordon meet Dr. Loveless for the fourth time. The doctor has invented a hallucinatory drug which, when used on Jim, makes him believe that he has shot and killed Artemus.
28	"The Night of the Sudden Plague"	Irving J. Moore	Ken Kolb	April 22, 1966	3224–0180	(none)
Guest stars: Theodore Marcuse (Dr. Vincent Kirby), Eddie Durkin (Frank Doyle), Mark Baker (Barber), Robert Phillips (Lafe), Harvey Levine (Hobson), Nobu McCarthy (Anna Kirby), H. M. Wynant (Coley Rodman), Elliott Reid (Governor Marcus Hawthorne) Upon arriving in Willow Springs, Jim and Artie find that a band of thieves have struck and are somehow managing to paralyze everyone in the entire town. Main Villain: Dr. Vincent Kirby

=== Season 2 (1966–67) ===
"Classics of literature, film, and contemporary science were shamelessly commandeered as their elements were submerged and made over into a style that was, and still is, unique to television. We sought words and images to convey that style ... baroque, outre, tiffany hues, rich crimsons and forest green, all in the mystery of chiaroscuro."
— Bruce Lansbury

The second season of The Wild Wild West continued the basic format of first season, but also made some changes. The most notable of these was that the series was now shot in color, which enhanced the Victorian ambiance of the 1870s setting. Both Robert Conrad and Ross Martin were given modified wardrobes, with Conrad wearing short bolero jackets and tight-fitting pants (he wore bolero jackets through the first season as well. There was also a shift in the choreography of the fight scenes, changing the emphasis from karate (largely used in the first season) to boxing.

As in the first season, Dr. Loveless was featured in four episodes. Meanwhile, an attempt was made to establish another recurring villain with the character of Count Manzeppi (played by Victor Buono, who had appeared in the pilot episode). However, the Count was dropped after only two episodes.

Again, as in the first season, 28 episodes were produced for the season. Initially, Michael Garrison continued in the dual capacity as producer and executive producer. However, after seven episodes, the producing chores were handed to Bruce Lansbury. Garrison returned to working solely as the series' executive producer. Garrison died on August 17, 1966, when he fell down a flight of stairs at his home in Bel Air.

The breakdown between the two producers, as broadcast, is:

- Michael Garrison – Season episodes 1–5, 12 and 14
- Bruce Lansbury – Season episodes 6–11, 13 and 15–28

However, the series continued to be listed as "A Michael Garrison Production in association with the CBS Television Network" in the end credits for the rest of the run.

The Wild Wild West slipped in the ratings during the second season, falling to 53rd in the Nielsens for the 1966–67 season. However, guest star Agnes Moorehead won an Emmy Award as Best Supporting Actress in a Drama Series for her performance in the episode "The Night of the Vicious Valentine".

No. overall	No. in season	Title	Directed by	Written by	Original release date	Prod. code	Artie's disguises
29	1	"The Night of the Eccentrics"	Robert Sparr	Charles Bennett	September 16, 1966	3224–0308	Aide to President Juarez
Guest stars: Victor Buono (Count Carlos Mario Vincenzo Robespierre Manzeppi), LeGrand Mellon (Miranda), Michael Masters (Titan), Richard Pryor (Villar), Anthony Eisley (Deadeye), Frank Sorello (Pres. Juarez), Andi Garrett (Nurse), Roy Jenson (Vance Markham), Harry Ellerbe (Colonel Armstrong), Paul Wallace (Tony) While searching for an undercover fellow agent (who turns up dead), Jim and Artie arrive at a circus where they find themselves pitted against the Eccentrics, a league of assassins commanded by the vicious Count Manzeppi.
30	2	"The Night of the Golden Cobra"	Irving J. Moore	Henry Sharp	September 23, 1966	3224–0301	Chinese manchu Soldier;East Indian magician
Guest stars: Boris Karloff (Mr. Singh), Audrey Dalton (Veda Singh), Jose De Vega (John Mountain-Top), James Westmoreland (Chandra), Michael York (Cupta), Morgan Farley (Mudjaz), Asoka (Dancer), Sujata (Dancer), John Alonzo (Sarrkan), Simon Scott (Colonel Stanton Mayo) Jim West is kidnapped by a maharajah who wants his sons to be tutored in the fine art of killing. West becomes the "polo ball" in a deadly game of polo.
31	3	"The Night of the Raven"	Irving J. Moore	Edward Di Lorenzo	September 30, 1966	3224–0306	(none)
Guest stars: Michael Dunn (Dr. Miguelito Loveless), Phyllis Newman (Princess Wanakee), Phoebe Dorin (Antoinette), Howard Hoffman (War Eagle), Sandy Josol (Chawtaw) The fifth encounter with Dr. Loveless, whose latest diabolical invention involves a powder that miniaturizes people. Jim West and an Indian princess are among his victims. Will a cat bring about the end of Agent West? Dr Loveless appears as the sheriff of a "ghost town".
32	4	"The Night of the Big Blast"	Ralph Senensky	Ken Kolb	October 7, 1966	3224–0303	(No make-up-but played a reanimated corpse/Human bomb)
Guest stars: Ida Lupino (Dr. Faustina), Patsy Kelly (Prudence Fortune), Mala Powers (Lily Fortune), Robert Miller Driscoll (Lyle Peters), Melville Ruick (Attorney General), Rita D'Amico (Carmen), Michael McCloud (Miklos) Dr. Faustina has created human-like robots that are walking time bombs. One of them looks exactly like Jim West and another like Artemus Gordon.
33	5	"The Night of the Returning Dead"	Richard Donner	John Kneubuhl	October 14, 1966	3224–0305	(none)
Guest stars: Sammy Davis Jr. (Jeremiah), Peter Lawford (Carl Jackson), Hazel Court (Elizabeth Carter), Frank Wilcox (Bill Mott), Alan Baxter (Ned Briggs), Ken Lynch (Tom Kellogg) Jim and Artie confront a ghost rider who seems to be immune to bullets.
34	6	"The Night of the Flying Pie Plate"	Robert Sparr	Dan Ullman	October 21, 1966	3224–0302	Dirk DeJohn, gem expert Mr. Spock type
Guest stars: William Windom (Ben Victor), Leslie Parrish (Morn), Whitey Hughes (Jerry), Ford Rainey (Simon), Pitt Herbert (Byron Pettigrew), Woodrow Chambliss (Wingo), Cindy Taylor (Pan), Arlene Charles (Alna) A bizarre scheme has West and Gordon involved with a green-skinned girl who emerged from what seems to a spaceship. She claims her ship needs gold for fuel.
35	7	"The Night of the Poisonous Posey"	Alan Crosland Jr.	Story by : Donn Mullally; Teleplay by : Leigh Chapman	October 28, 1966	3224–0307	Villain Ascot Sam
Guest stars: Delphi Lawrence (Lucrece Posey), Percy Rodriguez (Brutus), Michael Masters (Cyril), Shug Fisher (Sheriff Blayne Cord), Christopher Cary (Snakes Tolliver), Eugene Iglesias (Gallito), George Keymas (Sergei), Hal Lynch (Sam Colburn), Andre Philippe (Ascot Sam), H. M. Wynant (Pinto) The town of Justice, Nevada, is hangout for a group of international criminals headed by Lucrece Posey, who is planning on leading her group into a world-wide criminal organization-her gang is made up of a pyromaniac; a thuggish pugilist; a South American assassin; a Cowboy outlaw; an explosives expert, a mad Cossack and a Confidence Man. Unfortunately for them a certain two secret service agents on vacation happen to be passing through, and it is up to the pair to battle them into submission.
36	8	"The Night of the Bottomless Pit"	Robert Sparr	Ken Kolb	November 4, 1966	3224–0312	Convict;Pierre Gaspard, former legionnaire
Guest stars: Theodore Marcuse (Gustave Mauvais / Hubert Crandee), Joan Huntington (Camille Mauvais), Tom Drake (Vincent Reed), Gregg Martell (Guard B), Ernie Misko (Guard A), Chuck O'Brien (Couteau), Fred Carson (Le Cochon), Seymour Green (Lime), Steve Franken (LeFou), Mabel Albertson (Mrs. Grimes) Jim and Artie infiltrate a prison to rescue a fellow agent from a vicious commandant.
37	9	"The Night of the Watery Death"	Irving J. Moore	Michael Edwards (see note below)	November 11, 1966	3224–0313	Swedish sailor
Guest stars: John Ashley (Lt. Keighley), John van Dreelen (Marquis Philippe de La Mer), James Galante (Third Officer), Forrest Lewis (Captain Pratt), Jocelyn Lane (Dominique) Jim and Artie investigate a new weapon: a mysterious dragon-like creature that is blowing up ships. Together they must find the weapon before government ship, loaded with a cargo of explosives, arrives in the San Francisco harbor.
38	10	"The Night of the Green Terror"	Robert Sparr	John Kneubuhl	November 18, 1966	3224–0314	Indian woman
Guest stars: Michael Dunn (Dr. Miguelito Loveless), Phoebe Dorin (Antoinette), Anthony Caruso (Bright Star Chief), Peggy Rea (wife of Bright Star Chief), Paul Fix (Old Chief) The sixth encounter with Dr. Loveless a.k.a. Robin Hood of Sherwood forest, whose latest scheme involves a chemical that kills plant life and a suit of medieval armor.
39	11	"The Night of the Ready-Made Corpse"	Irving J. Moore	Ken Kolb (and Bob Wood, uncredited)	November 25, 1966	3224–0311	Bespectacled old man Thomas Link (criminal)
Guest stars: Carroll O'Connor (Fabian Lavender), Karen Sharpe (Rose Murphy), Paul Comi (Pellargo Double), Daniel Ades (Colonel Pellargo), Jack Perkins (Golo), Gene Tyburn (Finley), Andi Garrett (Barmaid), Alan Bergmann (Claudio Antille), Patricia Huston (Leda Pellargo) Jim and Artie are assigned to investigate one Fabian Lavender, a mortician who runs a peculiar side-line business: faking the deaths of wanted criminals.
40	12	"The Night of the Man-Eating House"	Alan Crosland Jr.	John Kneubuhl	December 2, 1966	3224–0310	(none)
Guest stars: Hurd Hatfield (Liston Day), William Talman (Sheriff) Jim, Artie, and a local sheriff are accompanying a convict back to prison who was convicted of treason during the Texas Revolution 40 years before. While resting for the night, Artie has a strange dream where he, Jim, and the sheriff chase their prisoner to an old abandoned mansion which is haunted by the spirit of a dead woman. In a twist ending West and Gordon find evidence of Day being innocent of treason but uncover a worse crime connected to Day.
41	13	"The Night of the Skulls"	Alan Crosland Jr.	Robert C. Dennis and Earl Barret	December 16, 1966	3224–0316	Minister at his own funeral Tigo; A pompous senator
Guest stars: Donald Woods (Senator Stephen Fenlow), Lisa Gaye (Lorelei), Douglas Henderson (Colonel Richmond), Anne Doud (Lucinda), Michael Masters (Bluebeard), William Bagdad (Prisoner), Calvin Brown (Iron Hook Harper), Francis DeSales (Charlton), Kem Dibbs (Plainclothesman), Robert Herron (Tigo), Quintin Sondergaard (Monk), Madame Spivy (Axe Lady), Sebastian Tom (Samurai) Jim becomes a fugitive on the run after he "shot and killed" Artie. In reality, however, he is tracking down a secret league of assassins.
42	14	"The Night of the Infernal Machine"	Sherman Marks	Shimon Wincelberg	December 23, 1966	3224–0304	Herr Ostropolyer, pastry chef
Guest stars: Ed Begley (Judge M'Guigan), Bill Zuckert (Inspector Bulvon), Elaine Dunn (Vashti), Jon Lormer (Vickerman), John Harmon (Moody), Michael Pate (Bledsoe), Will Kuluva (Zeno Baroda), Vito Scotti (Cefalu), Bill Gwinn (Judge) Jim and Artie aid a federal judge whose life has been threatened by a bomb-throwing clockmaker.
43	15	"The Night of the Lord of Limbo"	Jesse Hibbs	Henry Sharp	December 30, 1966	3224–0309	Duelist Jack Maitland (no make-up, but a different character)
Guest stars: Ricardo Montalbán (Colonel Noel Bartley Vautrain), Dianne Foster (Amanda Vautrain), Harry Harvey Sr. (Theater Manager), Tyler McVey (Professor), Gregory Morton (Levering), Felice Orlandi (Captain Vincent Scofield), Ed Prentiss (Colonel Fairchild), Davis Roberts (Bartender), Will J. White (Robber), Howard Wright (Professor) Jim and Artie encounter Colonel Vautrain, a crippled, legless former Confederate officer who has mastered the ability to travel through time. His plan is to go back in time and alter history, thus not only restoring his legs but also having the Confederate Army win the war — by killing President Ulysses S. Grant.
44	16	"The Night of the Tottering Tontine"	Irving J. Moore	Elon Packard and Norman Hudis	January 6, 1967	3224–0315	Blond secretary to Dr. Raven; Angus MacGordon
Guest stars: Harry Townes (Dr. Robert Raven), Wilhelm von Homburg (Gunther Pearse), William Wintersole (Edward Baring), Henry Darrow (Archduke Maurice), Robert Emhardt (Martin Grevely), Mike Road (Martin Dexter), Steve Gravers (Stimson), Arthur Space (Applegate), Ted Stanhope (Bartender), Lisa Pera (Amelia Maitlin) West and Gordon are assigned to protect Dr. Raven, who is developing a secret weapon and also a member of a tontine, an investment group whose bylaws state that the last surviving member of the group will receive the group's assets.
45	17	"The Night of the Feathered Fury"	Robert Sparr	Henry Sharp	January 13, 1967	3224–0317	Organ grinder Bald Uncle Hansi
Guest stars: Victor Buono (Count Carlos Mario Vincenzo Robespierre Manzeppi), Michele Carey (Gerda Scharff), Hideo Inamura (Benji), Perry Lopez (Dodo Le Blanc), Oliver McGowan (Colonel Armstrong), George Murdock (Luther Coyle), Georgia Schmidt (Scrub Woman), Audrey Lowell (Wanda) Jim and Artie encounter Count Manzeppi again. This time around the count is attempting to acquire a wind-up bird that contains the Philosopher's Stone.
46	18	"The Night of the Gypsy Peril"	Alan Crosland Jr.	Ken Kolb	January 20, 1967	3224–0319	Uncle Moe, the peddler
Guest stars: Ruta Lee (Zoe Zagora), Ronald Long (Sultan of Ramapur), Arthur Batanides (Scullen), Nick Cravat (Performer), Andi Garrett (Gypsy Girl), Charles Horvath (Gombal), Johnny Seven (Mikolik), Mark Slade (Hillard) The Sultan of Ramapur brings a sacred white elephant as a gift to President Grant. When bandits steal the elephant from Jim and Artie's train the outraged Sultan demands a compensation of $1 million. Events take an interesting turn when Jim follows the trail to a gypsy camp.
47	19	"The Night of the Tartar"	Charles R. Rondeau	Robert C. Dennis and Earl Barret	February 3, 1967	3224–0322	Russian immigrant Theodore Rimsky
Guest stars: John Astin (Count Sazanov), Susan Odin (Anastasia), Malachi Throne (Kuprin), Andre Phillipe (Fecdor Rimsky), Martin Blaine (Millard Boyer), Nancy Dow (Tersa), Chubby Johnson (Prospector), Louise Lawson (Miss Minnow), Michael Panaieff (Chekov), Wendy Stuart (Marsha), Walter Sande (Colonel Crockett), Larry Anthony (Detective), Lola Bell (Barber) President Grant orders West and Gordon to deliver Rimsky, a political prisoner, to Vladivostok in exchange for Millard Boyer, the American vice-consul. In the course of their duty the two are drugged and end up in Russia — or so it seems. Artemus speaks Russian in this episode (in real life, actor Ross Martin spoke Russian).
48	20	"The Night of the Vicious Valentine"	Irving J. Moore	Leigh Chapman	February 10, 1967	3224–0320	A Jewish tailor
Guest stars: Agnes Moorehead (Emma Valentine), Diane McBain (Elaine Dodd), Sherry Jackson (Michele LeMaster), Shephard Menken (E.N. Itnelav), Mitzie Evans (Gates), Quinn Cunningham (Minister), Don Delavay (Griffin the Butler), G. Edward McKinley (Curtis Langley Dodd), Walter Sande (Colonel Crockett), Henry Beckman (Paul J. Lambert), Whitey Hughes (Giggling Henchman) Jim and Artie investigate the killings of wealthy industrialists. They find that all the victims are linked to a matchmaker named Emma Valentine. Jim is held captive in Emma's matchmaking machine--his ideal woman is a combination of Aphrodite; Helen of Troy and Lola Montez. Ross Martin plays comic relief as a fussy German accented Jewish Tailor. Agnes Moorehead won the series' only Emmy for her performance in this episode.
49	21	"The Night of the Brain"	Larry Peerce	Calvin Clements Jr.	February 17, 1967	3224–0321	Leeto, the henchmen Leeto disguised as Artemus Gordon
Guest stars: Edward Andrews (Braine), Margaret Mason (Lola), Phil Arnold (Almeric), Brioni Farrell (Voulee), Allen Jaffe (Leeto), Jay Jostyn (Butler), Don Rizzan (Guard), John Warburton (Arnette) Jim and Artie receive fake newspapers that predict the deaths of their friends which the agents cannot prevent from happening. Their investigation pits them against an evil super-genius.
50	22	"The Night of the Deadly Bubble"	Irving J. Moore	Michael Edwards	February 24, 1967	3224–0324	An old blind beggar A drunken sailor
Guest stars: Alfred Ryder (Captain Horatio Philo), Judy Lang (Professor Abigail J. Pringle), Nacho Galindo (Pepe), Kai Hernandez (Maid), Nelson Welch (Professor McClennon), Lou Krugman (Blind Beggar/Felix), Whitey Hughes, Dick Cangey (Heavies), Mickey Golden, Robert Herron West and Gordon, investigating a series of mysterious tidal waves off the coast of San Francisco, encounter a fanatical marine environmentalist bent on eco-terrorism. Villain: Captain Horatio Philo
51	23	"The Night of the Surreal McCoy"	Alan Crosland Jr.	John Kneubuhl	March 3, 1967	3224–0323	Gunfighter Lightning McCoy
Guest stars: Michael Dunn (Dr. Miguelito Loveless), John Doucette (Axel Morgan), Ivan Triesault (Ambassador), John Alonzo (Lightnin' McCoy), Noel Drayton (Museum Director), Quintin Sondergaard (Gunman), Jorge Moreno (Barkeep) West and Gordon encounter Dr. Loveless for the seventh time. His latest invention can transport real people in and out of the two-dimensional world of paintings. In a "fair" gunfight arranged by Dr Loveless, Jim West and his six gun finds himself in a survival test against seven of the Old West fastest gunfighters including a final showdown with the fastest gunman "Lighting" McCoy
52	24	"The Night of the Colonel's Ghost"	Charles R. Rondeau	Ken Kolb	March 10, 1967	3224–0327	Ian Gellico Cooper-Featherstone, a big game hunter President Grant
Guest stars: Kathie Browne (Jennifer Caine), Lee Bergere (Colonel Wayne Gibson), Alan Hewitt (Lawyer Vincent Pernell), Arthur Hunnicutt (Doc Gavin), Roy Engel (President Ulysses S. Grant), Walker Edmiston (Sheriff Tom Hollis), Gordon Wescourt (Bert Caine), Ralph Gary (Chris Davidson), Billy Shannon (Abel Caine) West rides into the town of Gibsonville where he encounters a series of broken neck murders along with arguments over a lost stash of gold. Meanwhile, Gordon is escorting President Grant to dedication of a statue of the late Colonel Wayne Gibson in the very same town.
53	25	"The Night of the Deadly Blossom"	Alan Crosland Jr.	Daniel Mainwaring	March 17, 1967	3224–0328	A stevedore A red-suited villain
Guest stars: Peter Hale (Myron Kendrick), Nehemiah Persoff (Adam Barclay), Miiko Taka (Haruko), Pitt Herbert (Levering Mayhew David), George Keymas (Doctor 1), Lou Straley (Doctor 2), Carole Kane (Nurse), Tiki Santos (King Kalakua), Soon-Teck Oh (Houseboy), Reggie Valencia (Palea), Duane Grey (Dock Guard), Mel Prestidge (Polynesian) West and Gordon are assigned to guard the king of Hawaii, who is due to arrive secretly by ship. The deaths of four military officers and the mysterious sinking of the cruiser Youngstown lead them to believe that the king's life may be in danger. Jim West must escape Barclay's death trap. Loosely based on The Pit and the Pendulum.
54	26	"The Night of the Cadre"	Leon Benson	Digby Wolfe	March 24, 1967	3224–0326	Kelton, a traveling salesman A prison guard
Guest stars: Don Gordon (General Titus Trask), Richard Jaeckel (Sergeant Stryker), Sheilah Wells (Josephine), Ken Drake (Professor Frimm), Tol Avery (Warden Primwick), Vince Howard (Ralph Kleed) Jim impersonates a killer in order to track down General Titus Trask, a renegade army officer with a desire to kill President Grant. Can Jim stop Trask from turning President Grant into a mindless zombie?
55	27	"The Night of the Wolf"	Charles R. Rondeau	Robert C. Dennis and Earl Barret	March 31, 1967	3224–0329	King Stephan
Guest stars: Joseph Campanella (Talamantes), Lorri Scott (Leandra), Charles R. Radilac (Priest), Jonathan Lippe (Capt. Adam Dushan), Michael Shillo (Dr. Hanska), Eddie Fontaine (Sheriff Twilley), John Marley (King Stefan IX) Jim and Artie's latest assignment is to protect Stefan, a soon-to-be-crowned king. However, the evil Talamantes (with a pack of werewolves) has kidnapped Stefan's daughter, Leandra, and will only release her if Stefan renounces the throne.
56	28	"The Night of the Bogus Bandits"	Irving J. Moore	Henry Sharp	April 7, 1967	3224–0325	Mr. Lindsey, a southern artist Mr. Fargo, an old-time blacksmith
Guest stars: Michael Dunn (Dr. Miguelito Loveless), Marianna Hill (Belladonna), Patsy Kelly (Mrs. Bancroft), Grace Gaynor (Pearline Hastings), Don "Red" Barry (Rainey), Walter Sande (Colonel Crockett), Roland La Starza (Joe Kirby), Charles Wagenheim (Vance Rawlinson), William Challee (Fargo), Murray Alper (Bartender), Troy Melton (Whaley), Charles Fredericks (Drunk), Jack Orrison (Mr. Butcher), Jack Rigney (Mr. Krane), William Massey (Teller), Frank Sully (Telegrapher) The brilliant but evil Dr. Loveless is back for the eighth time with yet another plan to rule the world. His scheme this time around uses mock-ups of the prisons, armories, and the United States Treasury to train his henchmen to take over these resources upon his command.

=== Season 3 (1967–68) ===
The third season of The Wild Wild West saw a shift away from fantasy and more toward traditional western with the "villains becoming more political and less outrageous." Also, due to serious health problems, Michael Dunn appeared as Dr. Loveless in only one episode during this season ("The Night Dr. Loveless Died").

On January 24, 1968, when The Wild Wild West was near the end of shooting for the season, star Robert Conrad, who did the majority of his own stunt work, was seriously injured when he fell from a chandelier during the filming of the episode "The Night of the Fugitives". Production was shut down for the season and the "Fugitives" was completed and broadcast during the fourth season.

All of the episodes of this season were produced by Bruce Lansbury. Due to Conrad's injury only 24 episodes were made for this season. For its third season, the series rebounded slightly in the Nielsen ratings, moving up to 40th place from the previous season ranking of 53rd.

No. overall	No. in season	Title	Directed by	Written by	Original release date	Prod. code	Artie's disguises
57	1	"The Night of the Bubbling Death"	Irving J. Moore	David Moessinger	September 8, 1967	3224–0355	A one-eyed snake-in-the-grass A green-horned liquor salesman
Guest stars: Harold Gould (Victor Freemantle), Madlyn Rhue (Carlotta Waters), William Schallert (Silas Grigsby), A.G. Vitanza (Pima), Timmy Brown (Clint Cartwheel), Val Avery (Brad Logan) The U.S. Constitution document has been stolen by a dangerous revolutionary named Victor Freemantle. West and Gordon are sent to Texas to recover it. Rather than give into Freemantle's ransom demand of $1 million, they decide to infiltrate Freemantle's castle and retrieve the Constitution themselves. They learn, however, that Freemantle is not the mastermind behind the plot.
58	2	"The Night of the Firebrand"	Michael Caffey	Edward J. Lakso	September 15, 1967	3224–0360	Bluebeard, a trapper Canadian patriot, Paul Beaumont
Guest stars: Lana Wood (Sheila "Vixen" O'Shaugnessy), Pernell Roberts (Sean O'Reilly), Len Wayland (Major Jason), Paul Prokop (Clint Hoxie), Russ McCubbin (Briscoe), Zack Banks (Pierre), Paul Lambert (Andre Durain) West travels to Fort Savage to help prevent a revolution in Canada that outlaw O'Reilly has plans to incite. However, once there, he finds that O'Reilly is in control of the fort and is holding the fort's major and his men captive.
59	3	"The Night of the Assassin"	Alan Crosland Jr.	Robert C. Dennis and Earl Barret	September 22, 1967	3224–0352	A Mexican soldier A priest Halverson, a fat, old Texan
Guest stars: Robert Loggia (Colonel Arsenio Barbossa), Ramón Novarro (Don Tomas), Carlos Romero (Lieutenant), Nina Roman (Lupita Gonzalez), Phyllis Davis (Lt. Ramirez), Nate Esformes (Perrico Mendoza), Conlan Carter (Halvorsen), Donald Woods (Griswold) West and Gordon disrupt an assassination attempt on Mexico's President Juarez. Their plan is to return to Texas with the assassin they have captured, but first they must deal with the merciless Colonel Arsenio Barbossa.
60	4	"The Night Dr. Loveless Died"	Alan Crosland Jr.	Henry Sharp	September 29, 1967	3224–0357	Dr. Roman De Petritier
Guest stars: Michael Dunn (Dr. Miguelito Loveless/Dr. Liebknicht), Susan Oliver (Triste), Anthony Caruso (Deuce), Robert Ellenstein (Arthur Tickle), Peter Hale (Layden), Chubby Johnson (Sheriff Quail), Jonathan Hole (Bank Manager Welles), Lew Brown (Guard), Deborah Lee (Girl #1), Marty Koppenhafer (Girl #2) West and Gordon arrive in Hayes City where they identify the body of their archnemesis, Dr. Loveless. While there, they meet up with Triste, and Miguelito's next of kin, Dr. Liebknicht, a Swiss neurologist who strikingly resembles Loveless.
61	5	"The Night of Jack O'Diamonds"	Irving J. Moore	Denne Bart Petitclerc	October 6, 1967	3224–0351	Pancho, a bandit
Guest stars: Frank Silvera (El Sordo), Mario Alcalde (Fortuna), James Almanzar (Gregorio), David Renard (Enrique), Rico Alaniz (Chico), Louis Massad (Juan), Ref Sanchez (Antonio), Marie Gomez (Isabel) West and Gordon head south of the border with a present for the Mexico's president – a beautiful Arabian horse. However, after their arrival the horse is stolen by a group of outlaw bandits, jeopardizing the relationship between the two countries.
62	6	"The Night of the Samurai"	Gunnar Hellstrom	Shimon Wincelberg	October 13, 1967	3224–0361	Paolo Martinez, a Portuguese sea captain
Guest stars: Paul Stevens (Gideon Falconer aka "The Dutchman"), Jerry Fujikawa (Prince Shinosuki), John Hubbard (Clive Finsbury), Jane Betts (Madame Moustache), Thayer David (Hannibal Egloff), Khigh Dhiegh (Baron Saigo), Irene Tsu (Reiko O'Hara) While the U.S. State Department is returning a valuable samurai sword to its rightful owner, a Japanese prince, the sword is stolen by a group of assailants. To avoid damaging U.S.-Japan relations, Jim and Artie are assigned to locate the sword and return it to the prince before he commits seppuku. After a series of various encounters with those after the sword, Jim faces the villain in a dramatic sword fight.
63	7	"The Night of the Hangman"	James B. Clark	Peter G. Robinson and Ron Silverman	October 20, 1967	3224–0356	Undercover as a jewelry salesman
Guest stars: Harry Dean Stanton (Lucius Brand), Carolan Daniels (Mrs. Brand), Paul Fix (Judge Blake), Charles Lane (Roger Creed), Martin E. Brooks (Franklin Poore), Sarah Marshall (Eugenia Rawlins), Jesslyn Fax (Mrs. Peacock), John Pickard (Amos Rawlins), Gregg Palmer (Sheriff Jonas Bolt), Ahna Capri (Abigail Moss) During a stopover in a small town in Kansas, Jim and Artie become involved in a murder investigation. After a man is found guilty and sentenced to hang, the agents uncover information that points to a frame-up.
64	8	"The Night of Montezuma's Hordes"	Irving J. Moore	Max Ehrlich	October 27, 1967	3224–0354	An aged desert guide A Swedish waiter
Guest stars: Ray Walston (Professor Johnson), Jack Elam (Zack Slade), Edmund Hashim (Colonel Pedro Sanchez), Roland La Starza (Jake), Hal John Norman (Indian Guide), Roy Monsell (Dr. Mallory), Eddie Little Sky (Aztec chief), Carla Borelli (Sun Goddess) West and Gordon travel with Mexico's Colonel Sanchez and Zack Slade's men through the Texan desert in search of the lost treasure of Montezuma. Villain: Professor Johnson.
65	9	"The Night of the Circus of Death"	Irving J. Moore	Arthur Weingarten	November 3, 1967	3224–0363	Ermerson P. Gentry, a Southern gentleman An old cleaning man
Guest stars: Paul Comi (Burt Farnsworth), Philip Bruns (Abner Lennox), Joan Huntington (Mary Lennox), Arlene Martel (Erika), Arthur Malet (Doc Keyno), Florence Sundstrom (Mrs. Moore), Dort Clark (Colonel Housley), Morgan Farley (Harry Holmes), Judi Sherven (Priscilla), Merri Ashley (Girl), Sharon Cintron (Secretary), Ernie Misko (Guard), Barbara Hemmingway (Lola), John Armond (Bronzini) West and Gordon attempt to track down the source of the counterfeit money that is appearing in sufficient quantities to undermine the U.S. economy, all the while dodging flamethrowers and hungry lions.
66	10	"The Night of the Falcon"	Marvin Chomsky	Robert E. Kent	November 10, 1967	3224–0362	Felice Muñez, a Spanish syndicate chief
Guest stars: Robert Duvall (Dr. Horace Humphries/The Falcon), Lisa Gaye (Lana Benson), Edward Knight (General Lassiter), Douglas Henderson (Colonel Richmond), Kurt Kreuger (Heindorf), John Alderson (Clive Marchmount), Joseph Ruskin (Muñez), George Keymas (Balya), Gene Tyburn (Felton), Michele Tobin (Bonnie), William Phipps (Marshall) West and Gordon tangle with a mysterious villain called the Falcon, who has developed a giant gun that can level entire towns. And now it is aimed at Denver. Villain: Dr. Horace Humphries/The Falcon
67	11	"The Night of the Cut-throats"	Alan Crosland Jr.	Edward J. Lakso	November 17, 1967	3224–0353	Joe, the piano player
Guest stars: Bradford Dillman (Michael Trayne), Beverly Garland (Sally Yarnell), Jackie Coogan (Sheriff Koster), Walter Burke (Mayor Cassidy), Shug Fisher (Jeremiah), Eddie Quillan (Hogan), Harry Swoger (Bartender), Lou Straley (Clerk), Quintin Sondergaard (Man), Sharon Cintron (Waiting Lady) A band of seedy cut-throats are gathering just outside the small town of New Athens and forcing the residents to leave in droves. Their leader is Michael Trayne, a vicius killer back in town after three years in jail. it's up to Jim and Artie to put a stop to Trayne's activities, ultimately accomplished by Jim in a gunfight with Trayne.
68	12	"The Night of the Legion of Death"	Alex Nicol	Robert C. Dennis and Earl Barret	November 24, 1967	3224–0368	Aaron Addison, an old man who is about to die A Moroccan
Guest stars: Anthony Zerbe (Zeke Montgomery), Robert Terry (Dan Kittridge), Kent Smith (Governor Brubaker), Douglas Rowe (Attendant), James Nusser (Reeves), Toian Matchinga (Henriette Fauer), Karen Jensen (Katherine Kittridge), Alex Gerry (Judge), Bill Erwin (Jury Foreman), Walter Brooke (Prosecutor), Eli Behar (Warden), Donnelly Rhodes (Captain Dansby) West and Gordon take on a Black Legion of troops who are terrorizing a territory out west. Their leader seems to be their territorial Governor, but there is a more sinister power behind the scenes of all the illegal activities -- the final confrontation of West and Gordon with the chief villain in a surprise twist ending.
69	13	"The Night of the Turncoat"	James B. Clark	Story by : Peter G. Robinson and Ron Silverman; Teleplay by : Leigh Chapman	December 1, 1967	3224–0367	A mailcarrier A longshoreman A waiter
Guest stars: John McGiver (Elisha Calamander), Marj Dusay (Crystal Fair), Douglas Henderson (Colonel Richmond), Dick Cangey (Moke), Ron Brogan (Guard Officer), Frank Cappiello (Teller), Frederick Combs (Elevator Operator), James Driskill (Bartender), Kay Cousins Johnson (Matron), Richard Karie (Keeley), David Frank (2nd Reporter), George Sperdakos (Door Guard), John Armond (Waiter), Noel Swann (Golem), Andy Davis (Hansbury), Bebe Louie (Song), Brad Trumbull (Doctor), Walker Edmiston (Preacher) Jim's temper flares as he seems to be under stress and making many mistakes, resulting in his resignation from the Secret Service. Shortly afterwards, he is recruited by some member of the underworld who seeks to capitalize on his misfortune.
70	14	"The Night of the Iron Fist"	Marvin Chomsky	Ken Pettus	December 8, 1967	3224–0369	Count Draja
Guest stars: Mark Lenard (Count Draja), Lisa Pera (Countess Zorana), Bill Fletcher (Stark), James Gavin (Sheriff), Fred Stromsoe (Cal), Red West (Roy), Jerry Laveroni (Cass), Whitey Hughes (George), Dick Cangey (Ben), Craig Shreeve (Reporter), Wayne Heffley (Deputy), Troy Melton (Harry), Wilhelm Von Homburg (Abel), Bo Hopkins (Zack), Ross Hagen (Kelso), Ford Rainey (Garrison) Jim is assigned to escort Bosnia's Count Draja through 100 miles of no-man's land to Buffalo Springs where the count will be turned over for extradition. Meanwhile, there is the little matter of the $500,000 the Count hid somewhere in the United States, as well as a band of outlaws determined to set the Count free.
71	15	"The Night of the Running Death"	Gunnar Hellstrom	Edward J. Lakso	December 15, 1967	3224–0364	Jonathan Ashley Kingston, an actor An Italian waiter
Guest stars: Oscar Beregi Jr. (Colonel Diebolt), Laurie Burton (Alice), Tony Gange (Waiter), John Pickard (Governor Ireland), Don Rizzan (Markham), Britt Nilsson (Joan), Laurence Aten (Desk Clerk), Jerry Laveroni (El Bardhoom), Sherry Mitchell (Silva), Dante DiPaolo (Jeff Smith), Dub Taylor (Pete), Ken Del Conte (Head Guard), Jason Evers (Christopher Kohner), Maggie Thrett (Deirdre), Whitey Hughes (Thug), Karen Arthur (Gerta), T. C. Jones (Enzo/Miss Tyler), Ken Swofford (Sloan), Jerry Maren (Coco) A dying man's words lead Jim and Artie to a wagon train of entertainers and an attempt on the life of a princess. Villain: Colonel Diebolt
72	16	"The Night of the Arrow"	Alex Nicol	Leigh Chapman	December 29, 1967	3224–0358	Cavalry officer Jonathan Greeley; A drunk A scruffy jailbird A dead Indian
Guest stars: Jeannine Riley (Aimee Baldwin), Robert Phillips (Oconee), Robert J. Wilke (Gen. Baldwin), Roy Engel (President Ulysses S. Grant), Frank Marth (Colonel Rath), Logan Field (Sergeant), Paul Sorenson (Major Lock), Lew Brown (2nd Guard), William Bassett (Lt. Carter), William Massey (Jailer), Venita Wolf (Lucy) Jim and Artie are out to find Strong Bear of the Sioux, who is threatening to break the territorial peace treaty.
73	17	"The Night of the Headless Woman"	Alan Crosland Jr.	Edward J. Lakso	January 5, 1968	3224–0370	An old sea dog
Guest stars: Theodore Marcuse (Abdul Hassan), Dawn Wells (Betsy Jeffers), Richard Anderson (Commissioner James Jeffers), John McLiam (Tucker), Steve Mitchell (Ringo), Harry Lauter (Marshal), Quintin Sondergaard (Driver), Don Rizzan (Grooves), Pepe Callahan (Jon), Marlene Tracy (Joanne), Sandra Wells (Mary), Marina Ghane (Fatima), Lou Straley (Swanson) Jim and Artie set out to find the mastermind of an operation to destroy the nation's cotton crop through the use of boll weevils.
74	18	"The Night of the Vipers"	Marvin Chomsky	Robert E. Kent	January 12, 1968	3224–0371	Ned Buntline
Guest stars: Nick Adams (Sheriff Dave Cord), Donald Davis (Mayor Vance Beaumont), Sandra Smith (Nadine Conover), Red West (Jack Klaxton), Richard O'Brien (Sheriff Tenny), Whitey Hughes (Deputy), Clay Hodges (Boxer), Johnny Haymer (Aloysius Moriarty) Jim and Artie are out to stop a gang of ruthless crooks known as the Vipers who have been looting a string of Kansas towns, robbing banks and killing citizens.
75	19	"The Night of the Underground Terror"	James B. Clark	Max Hodge	January 19, 1968	3224–0366	An Englishman; Col. Mosley
Guest stars: Nehemiah Persoff (Major Hazard), Sabrina Scharf (China Hazard), Jeff Corey (Tacitus Mosely), Dick Cangey (Carter), Whitey Hughes (Steinlen), Jerry Laveroni (Quist), Red West (Maberly), Douglas Henderson (Colonel Richmond), Kenya Coburn (Madame Pompadour), Louise Lawson (Slave Girl), Terry Leonard (Cope), Gregg Martell (Cajun) During Mardi Gras in New Orleans, West is captured by Major Hazard, the leader of a gang of crippled Civil War prisoners-of-war who are seeking revenge on Mosely, the camp's commandant.
76	20	"The Night of the Death Masks"	Mike Moder	Ken Pettus	January 26, 1968	3224–0372	Emmett Stark
Guest stars: Milton Selzer (Emmett Stark), Patricia McCormack (Betsy), Douglas Henderson (Colonel Richmond), Holly Bane (Stage Driver), Sam Edwards (Station Master), Bobbie Jordan (Fleur Fogarty), Bill Quinn (Dr. Prior), Louis Quinn (Goff), Judith McConnell (Amanda) West is attacked and knocked unconscious. He awakens in a strange deserted town filled with assailants wearing masks in the likeness of Emmett Stark, an escaped murderer whom West had imprisoned years earlier – and now Stark wants revenge.
77	21	"The Night of the Undead"	Marvin Chomsky	Calvin Clements Jr.	February 2, 1968	3224–0373	Beldon Scolville, Jr. Major Brainard of the Corps of Engineers
Guest stars: Hurd Hatfield (Dr. Articulus), Priscilla Morrill (Phalah), John Zaremba (Eddington), Hal Dewindt (Taro), David Fresco (Griseley), Roosevelt Grier (Tiny Jon), Dick Cangey (Guard), Marvin Brody (Player #1), Rush Williams (Player #2), Joan Delaney (Mariah Eddington), Alvenia Bentley (Creole Dancer), Joseph Perry (Bartender), Kai Hernandez (Domino) While tracking down a missing scientist Jim and Artie become involved with a voodoo ceremony and the walking dead. Villain: Dr. Articulus
78	22	"The Night of the Amnesiac"	Lawrence Dobkin	Story by : Robert Bloomfield; Teleplay by : Leigh Chapman	February 9, 1968	3224–0365	Dr. Zorbi, a magician
Guest stars: Edward Asner (Furman Crotty), Sharon Farrell (Cloris Colter), Jerry Laveroni (Irish), John Kellogg (Rusty), Kevin Hagen (Silas Crotty), Gil Lamb (Claude), George Petrie (Colonel Petrie), Johnny Jensen (The Boy), James Nolan (The Warden), Jack Rigney (The Bartender), Don Howorth (The Brute), Sebastian Tom (Masseur) Furman Crotty, a convicted criminal serving time in Leavenworth, demands his release from jail along with a full pardon in exchange for the safe return of a smallpox vaccine. Meanwhile, Jim has been injured in the attack on the stage and is struggling with amnesia. Artie must find both his friend and the vaccine before a full-scale epidemic hits. Gordon helps West literally bring down the curtain on Crotty.
79	23	"The Night of the Simian Terror"	Michael Caffey	Robert C. Dennis and Earl Barret	February 16, 1968	3224–0374	Dr. Marvin Gentry
Guest stars: Dabbs Greer (Senator Seth Buckley), Grace Gaynor (Naomi Buckley), Richard Kiel (Dimas), John S. Ragin (Reverend Hastings), Felice Orlandi (Benjamin Buckley), Lori Lehman (Priscilla Hastings), H. M. Wynant (Aaron), Gabriel Walsh (Farmer), James Gavin (Fletcher), Ben Aliza (Caleb), John Abbott (Dr. Von Liebig), George D. Barrows (Johann) Jim and Artie visit the plantation of a U.S. Senator who has a mysterious family past that involved a scientist's experiments with apes.
80	24	"The Night of the Death-Maker"	Irving J. Moore	Robert E. Kent	February 23, 1968	3224–0375	Claude Assir Renard, a French wine expert Ulysses S. Grant
Guest stars: Wendell Corey (Cullen Dane), Angel Tompkins (Marcia Dennison), Roy Engel (President Grant), Arthur Batanides (Sergeant), Nicky Blair (Monk), Michael Fox (Gillespie), Charles Lampkin (Clerk), Joe Lansden (Secret Service Man/Charlie), Britt Nillsson (Girl #1), Gale Warren (Girl #2), J. Pat O'Malley (Brother Angelo) West and Gordon foil an assassination attempt on President Grant. The weapon used in the attempt was one stolen in recent raids on government and territorial armories. And improperly-made wine leads to a monastery under illegal occupation

=== Season 4 (1968–69) ===
Due to his injury near the end of filming of the previous season, the fourth season of The Wild Wild West forced Robert Conrad to use a double for any stunt that the studio considered "chancy." On June 26, 1968, during filming of "The Night of the Avaricious Actuary", Ross Martin fell and received a hairline fracture in his shin. As a result, the script for the next episode filmed, "The Night of the Juggernaut", was re-written to have Martin's character, Artemus Gordon, receive a leg injury. On August 17 of the same year Martin suffered a massive heart attack. A five-week hiatus in filming had just begun, but Martin's recovery time was much longer. Nine episodes were filmed without Martin although he continued to have co-star billing in the opening credits. The absence of his character was explained as being on "special assignment" in Washington, D.C.

Ross Martin returned to filming for the final three episodes of the season, which also turned out to be the last episodes of the entire series. The Wild Wild West experienced a precipitous decline in its Nielsen ratings, falling to 87th place out of 92 series for the 1968-69 television season. Due to declining ratings, as well as a crack-down on programs with excessive violence, the series was cancelled after four seasons.

During this season, Ross Martin received an Emmy Award nomination for leading actor in a drama series. All of the fourth-season episodes were produced by Bruce Lansbury.

No. overall	No. in season	Title	Directed by	Written by	Original release date	Prod. code	Artie's disguises
81	1	"The Night of the Big Blackmail"	Irving J. Moore	David Moessinger	September 27, 1968	3224–0602	Hans, the German cook President Grant
Guest stars: Harvey Korman (Baron Hinterstoisser), Ron Rich (Dick January), Jerry Laveroni (Ziegler), Roy Engel (President Ulysses S. Grant), Wilhelm von Homburg (Herr Hess), Gilchrist Stuart (Gruber), Martin Kosleck (Count Hackmar), Alice Nunn (Hilda) In Washington, D.C. the German Consul, Baron Hinterstoisser, announces he has something very interesting for President Grant to see. West and Gordon find that it is a kinetoscope showing Grant (actually a double) signing a secret agreement with the representative of an enemy nation. Hinterstoisser shows the kinetescope before an attentive crowd.
82	2	"The Night of the Doomsday Formula"	Irving J. Moore	Samuel Newman	October 4, 1968	3224–0601	Dr. Crane; Mr. Hassan Amir Ortuglo, Arab dealer in exotic weapontry
Guest stars: Kevin McCarthy (Major General Walter Kroll), Melinda Plowman (Lorna Crane), Gail Billings (Verna Scott), E. J. André (Dr. Crane), Vince Howard (Bartender), Dick Cangey (1st Guard), Fred Stromsoe (2nd Guard), Red West (3rd Guard), Tommy J. Huff (4th Guard) West and Gordon are assigned to rescue Dr. Crane and his daughter. The doctor has invented a new "doomsday formula" which could spell the end of the United States if it falls into the wrong hands.
83	3	"The Night of the Juggernaut"	Irving J. Moore	Calvin Clements Jr.	October 11, 1968	3224–0608	Ellsworth Caldwell, a wealthy Texas gentleman
Guest stars: Floyd Patterson (Lyle Dixon), Gloria Calomee (Lonie Millard), Simon Scott (Theodore Bock), Fred Stromsoe (Hardcase), Peter Hale (Harwood), Byron Foulger (County Clerk), Bart La Rue (Storekeeper), Irving Mosley (Farmer #2), Evelyn Dutton (Nurse #1), Stardedt Kaava (Nurse #2), Stuart Nisbet (Farmer #1), Wild Bill Reynolds (Geezer) Someone is trying to run settlers off their land, buying some of them out, scaring others away, and even murdering those who refuse to leave.
84	4	"The Night of the Sedgewick Curse"	Marvin Chomsky	Paul Playdon	October 18, 1968	3224–0610	Colonel Doyle of the British Army (retired); A Frenchman
Guest stars: Sharon Acker (Lavinia Sedgewick), Richard Hale (Sedgewick), Maria Lennard (Jessica), Jay Robinson (Dr. Maitland), Arthur Space (Redmond), Frank Campanella (Fingers the Masseur), Gene LeBell (Felix), Kathryn Minner (Old Lady/Aged Lavinia), Red West (Man #1), Dick Cangey (Man #2), Arthur Adams (Desk Clerk #1/Hiram), Lee Weaver (Desk Clerk #2) West and Gordon come upon the Sedgewick family, whose members have experienced rapid aging. In an attempt to cure this disorder, their family physician has been kidnapping people afflicted with the same disorder and using them to test a serum he has prepared.
85	5	"The Night of the Gruesome Games"	Marvin Chomsky	Jackson Gillis	October 25, 1968	3224–0606	Dr. Raker; A saddle bum Rufus Kraus
Guest stars: Robert Ellenstein (Dr. Theobald Raker), William Schallert (Rufus Kraus), Sherry Jackson (Lola Cortez), Robert Patten (Dr. DeForest), Ludmila (Ballerina), Helen Page Camp (Charity), Ken Drake (General Crocker), I. Stanford Jolley (Town Doctor), Reggie Nalder (Count Zendar), Jacquelyn Hyde (Marquesia Bellini), Astrid Warner (Gilda Novak), Gregg Palmer (Bartender), Adolph Caesar (Vidoq), Lee Kolima (No-Fun) West and Gordon are after an evil scientist who has stolen a vial filled with deadly germs, which they must recover before the vial bursts and causes a devastating plague. However, they are sidetracked in the home of Rufus Kraus and are pulled into a night of deadly parlor games.
86	6	"The Night of the Kraken"	Michael Caffey	Stephen Kandel	November 1, 1968	3224–0612	A Portuguese fisherman A workman A Swedish repairman
Guest stars: Ford Rainey (Admiral Charles Hammond), Marj Dusay (Dolores Hammond), Ted Knight (Daniel), Jason Evers (Commander Beech), Anthony Caruso (Jose Aguila), Bill Baldwin (Workman), Larry Grant (Aide), Gregg Martell (Bartender #1), Claudio Miranda (Bartender #2), Brent Davis (Lt. Dave Bartlett) In San Francisco, Jim and Artie's friend, Lt. Bartlett, is killed, apparently the victim of a strange tentacled sea creature. It soon becomes apparent to them that an insidious threat is behind Bartlett's killing.
87	7	"The Night of the Fugitives"	Mike Moder (and Gunnar Hellstrom, uncredited)	Ken Pettus	November 8, 1968	3224–0376	Hallelujah Harry
Guest stars: Simon Oakland (Diamond Dave Desmond), Susan Hart (Rhoda), Charles McGraw (Baggs), Douglas Henderson (Colonel Richmond), J.S. Johnson (Norbert Plank), Mickey Hargitay (Monk), Gabriel Walsh (Shopkeeper), Bill Baldwin (Hallelujah Harry), Larry Duran (Mexican), Sid McCoy (Tod Warner), A.G. Vitanza (Grady) Jim travels to the town of Epitaph to arrest Norbert Plank, the chief bookkeeper for the corrupt and powerful syndicate that owns the town's mining company. Through Plank, the agents stand to get hold of valuable records about the syndicate's illegal activities. Villain: Diamond Dave Desmond
88	8	"The Night of the Egyptian Queen"	Marvin Chomsky	Paul Playdon	November 15, 1968	3224–0604	Captain Hull, formerly of her Majesty's frigate, the Northcumberland
Guest stars: Tom Troupe (Jason Starr), William Marshall (Amalek), Sorrell Booke (Heisel), Penny Gaston (Rosie), Gene Tyburn (Gambler), Morgan Farley (Curator), Hal K. Dawson (Ferret), Walter Brooke (Finley) Jim and Artie are on the trail of a priceless ruby has been stolen from the eye of the statue of Sun God, Ra, at the San Francisco museum. Their trail leads them to Rosie, a beautiful young dancer, who is wearing the ruby on her toe.
89	9	"The Night of Fire and Brimstone"	Bernard McEveety	Story by : Palmer Thompson; Teleplay by : Joel Kane and Milton Smith	November 22, 1968	3224–0611	The elderly Dr. Crane; General Robert E. Lee
Guest stars: Robert Phillips (Frank Roach), Bill Quinn (Dr. Emmet Sloane), Leslie Charleson (Dooley Sloane), Dabbs Greer (Captain Lyman Butler), John Crawford (Prof. Philip Colecrest), Charles Macaulay (Zach Morton), Dick Cangey (Rusty), Fred Stromsoe (Lefty), Red West (Chuck), Tommy J. Huff (Pete), Ken Mayer (Hannon) West and Gordon come to the deserted mining town of Brimstone to meet Professor Colecrest, who has made a very important discovery. Their adventures lead them into the underground mines where strange things occur, including an encounter with an aged Confederate soldier who is unaware that the war ended many years earlier.
90	10	"The Night of the Camera"	Marvin Chomsky	Ken Pettus	November 29, 1968	3224–0616	(None — Ross Martin does not appear in this episode)
Guest stars: Charles Aidman (Jeremy Pike), Pat Paulsen (Bosley Cranston), Julio Medina (Don Carlos), Victor Sen Yung (Baron Kyosai), Walker Edmiston (Langham), Barry Atwater (Gideon Stix) Agents West and Pike are on the trail of an opium gang. They receive some dubious help from Bosley Cranston, a meek and seemingly incompetent agent on his first field assignment. However, Cranston has some special talents that will prove invaluable.
91	11	"The Night of the Avaricious Actuary"	Irving J. Moore	Henry Sharp	December 6, 1968	3224–0615	Salvadore, a waiter An old gas man
Guest stars: Harold Gould (John Taney/Dr Kovacs), Jenny Maxwell (Billie), Ross Elliott (General Caswell), Emily Banks (Arden Masterson), Steve Gravers (Durkin), Tol Avery (Asa Dempster), Lou Krugman (Hotel maitre d'), Fritz Feld (Chef), Judi Sherven (Cora Lister), Sharon Cintron (Girl #1), Linda Cooper (Girl #2), Barbara Hemmingway (Fat Lady), Frank Simonetti (Fat Man #1), Bennett King (Fat Man #2), Jack Spratt (Fat Man #3), Ray Dawe (Fat Man #4) West and Gordon investigate a series of explosions that have destroyed several palatial homes. They discover that the destruction is being caused by a giant tuning fork radiating powerful sound waves.
92	12	"The Night of Miguelito's Revenge"	James B. Clark	Jerry Thomas	December 13, 1968	3224–0613	(None — Ross Martin does not appear in this episode)
Guest stars: Charles Aidman (Jeremy Pike), Michael Dunn (Dr. Miguelito Loveless), Douglas Henderson (Colonel Richmond), Peter Hale (Chris), Susan Seaforth Hayes (Delilah), Arthur Batanides (Pylo), Jim Shane (Tiny), Don Pedro Colley (Abbie Carter), Percy Helton (newsstand proprietor), Byron Morrow (Judge Fairlie), Linda Chandler (Lynn Carstairs), Walter Coy (Cyrus Barlow), Peter Bruni (Ivan Kalinkovitch), Johnny S. Luer (Biff Trout), Roy Barcroft (Sheriff), Dort Clark (Theater Manager), Paul Barselou (Storekeeper), Mary Esther Denver (Lady Barber), Wendy Douglas (Saloon Girl), David Montresor (Butler), Marguerite Ray (Mrs. Carter) West is joined by Jeremy Pike in this tenth encounter with Dr. Loveless. This time around the doctor is behind a series of kidnappings. His victims are all people he felt had wronged him in the past and now he is plotting his revenge.
93	13	"The Night of the Pelican"	Alex Nicol	Richard Landau	December 27, 1968	3224–0609	(None — Ross Martin does not appear in this episode)
Guest stars: Charles Aidman (Jeremy Pike), Khigh Dhiegh (Din Chang), Francine York (Dr. Sara Gibson), Vincent Beck (Corporal Simon), Lou Cutell (Major Frederick Frey), Andre Phillippe (Jean-Paul), Debbie Wong (Kuei), Linda Ho (Chinese Girl #2), James Shen (Quen Yung), Buck Kartalian (Lt. Bengston), Lorna Denels (Jeanne), Holly Mascott (Molly), John Creamer (Colonel Kelton Morse), Tommy Lee (Ancient Puppeteer) West and Pike are on the trail of a stolen a supply of fulminate of mercury from a military arsenal. Their trail leads to the prison at Alcatraz, which has been taken over by the evil Din Chang.
94	14	"The Night of the Spanish Curse"	Paul Stanley	Robert E. Kent	January 3, 1969	3224–0603	A young Mexican; An old Mexican
Guest stars: Thayer David (Cortez), Toian Matchinga (Cosina Ramirez), Jorge Moreno (Proprietor), Lou Peralta (Conquistador #1), Fred Stromsoe (Conquistador #2), Joe Pepi (Guard #1), Fred Villani (Morales), Jon Lormer (2nd Elder), Gil Serna (Fernandez), Ted de Corsia (1st Elder), Pepe Callahan (Captain Rojas), Richard Angarola (Allesandro), Edward Colmans (Juan Ramirez) West and Gordon investigate a group of bandits who are attacking and terrorizing border towns. They track the bandits to a Mexican village where the thieves are hiding under the guise of an old Mexican legend about Cortez. Jim and Artie, not believing in the return of the god Cortez, are determined to find their way into the dormant volcano where the thugs are hiding.
95	15	"The Night of the Winged Terror – Part I"	Marvin Chomsky	Ken Pettus	January 17, 1969	3224–0619	(None — Ross Martin does not appear in this episode)
Guest stars: William Schallert (Frank Harper), Robert Ellenstein (Dr. Occularis Second), Michele Carey (Laurette), Christopher Cary (Tycho), Jackie Coogan (Mayor Cecil Pudney), Bernard Fox (Dr. Occularis-Jones), Roy Engel (President Grant), Valentin de Vargas (Chaveros), Harry Lauter (Sheriff), Vic Perrin (Professor Simon Winkler), Norman Leavitt (Mayor Hiram Sneed), Ron Pinkard (Deputy), James Milton George (Judd Brass), Chuck Waters (Tom Brass), Chuck Courtney (Zack Brass), Lillian Lehman (Secretary), Dorothy Neumann (Zenobia Finch) Agents West and Harper investigate a series of disturbing incidents involving a raven that hypnotizes high-ranking officials into committing crimes. The incidents lead the two agents to "The Raven", group led by Thaddeus Toombs and a man called Tycho.
96	16	"The Night of the Winged Terror – Part II"	Marvin Chomsky	Ken Pettus	January 24, 1969	3224–0620	(None — Ross Martin does not appear in this episode)
Guest stars: William Schallert (Frank Harper), Robert Ellenstein (Dr. Occularis Second), Michele Carey (Laurette), Christopher Cary (Tycho), John Harding (Toombs), Valentin de Vargas (Chaveros), Vic Perrin (Professor Simon Winkler), Roy Engel (President Grant), Frank Sorello (Ambassador Ramirez), Rico Alaniz (Mexican Agent), Julio Medina (Townsman), Zack McWiggins (Agent #1), James McEachin (Agent #2), Peter Hale (Agent #3), Don Ross (Agent #4), Jeraldo deCordovier (Peon), Lisa Todd (Bonnie), Lillian Lehman (Secretary), Annette Molen (Virginia) (Note: Jackie Coogan, Vic Perrin, Lillian Lehman, and Roy Engel only appear in the part 1 recap that replaces the usual pre-credits teaser.) Still battling "The Raven", Frank Harper rescues the hypnotized Jim West from assassinating the Mexican Ambassador. West and Harper then continue to infiltrate, undermine, and bring the group to justice.
97	17	"The Night of the Sabatini Death"	Charles R. Rondeau	Shirl Hendryx	February 7, 1969	3224–0617	(None — Ross Martin does not appear in this episode)
Guest stars: Alan Hale Jr. (Ned Brown), Jill Townsend (Sylvia Nolan), Bethel Leslie (Melanie/Laura Samples), Jim Backus (Swanson), Don "Red" Barry (Farnsworth/Harry Boorman), Douglas Henderson (Colonel Richmond), Eddie Quillan (Snidley), Ben Wright (Clarence), Ted de Corsia (Johnny Sabatini/Nolan), Thomas A. Geas (Sheriff Chayne), Red West (Heavy #1), Dick Cangey (Heavy #2) After meeting with the dying crime czar Sabatini, Jim and fellow agent Ned Brown travel to Calliope, Missouri, where an Army finance officer died after stealing $500,000.
98	18	"The Night of the Janus"	Irving J. Moore	Story by : Paul Playdon; Teleplay by : Leonard Katzman	February 14, 1969	3224–0621	(None — Ross Martin does not appear in this episode)
Guest stars: Charles Aidman (Jeremy Pike), Jack Carter (Alan Thorpe), Anthony Eisley (Warren Blessing), Jackie DeShannon (Torrey), Arthur Malet (Prof. Montague), Nicky Blair (Thompson), Benny Rubin (Janus), Vince Barnett (Swanson), Mark Allen (Instructor), Gail Billings (Myra Bates), Bill Monemaker (Thomas), Ron Heller (Wallace), James Ryan (Stevens), Bonnie Hughes (Linda), Walter Kelley (Mint Guard), Bob Dodson (Hardcase) A melody holds the clue that agents West and Pike need to trap a departmental traitor.
99	19	"The Night of the Pistoleros"	Bernard McEveety	Robert C. Dennis and Earl Barret	February 21, 1969	3224–0605	General Rodell
Guest stars: Edward Binns (Colonel Roper), Robert Pine (Lt. Murray), Henry Wilcoxon (Armando Galiano), Perry Lopez (Sanchos), Richard O'Brien (Sgt. Charlie Tobin), Eugene Iglesias (Bernal), William O'Connell (Dr. Winterich), John Pickard (Duty Sergeant), Daniel Ades (Lopez), Jay Jostyn (Major), Sarita Vara (Mariana), Joe Raciti (Barman) West and Gordon head to a lonely outpost where they battle a terrorist gang.
100	20	"The Night of the Diva"	Herb Wallerstein	Story by : Alf Harris; Teleplay by : Ken Pettus	March 7, 1969	3224–0623	Count Vladislav de Raja
Guest stars: Patrice Munsel (Rosa Montebello), Patrick Horgan (Max Crenshaw), Beverly Todd (Angelique), Douglas Henderson (Colonel Richmond), Martin Kosleck (Igor), Patricia Dunne (Ellen Collingwood), Lester Fletcher (Karl Crenshaw), Geraldine Baron (Caroline Mason), Margery MacKay (First Diva), Jorge Ben-Hur (Bartender), Khalil Bezaleel (Deluc), David Constantine (Messenger) West and Gordon investigate the recent disappearance of several opera divas in New Orleans. While there they unravel a plot involving the secret Order of Lucia and also reveal who among their new acquaintances is playing a role on and off the stage.
101	21	"The Night of the Bleak Island"	Marvin Chomsky	Robert E. Kent	March 14, 1969	3224–0622	(None — Ross Martin does not appear in this episode)
Guest stars: John Williams (Sir Nigel Scott/Callender), Beverly Garland (Celia Rydell), Richard Erdman (Mordecai Krone), Robert H. Harris (Steven Rydell), Lorna Lewis (Helen Merritt), Jon Lormer (Boatman), Pat O'Hara (Jarvis), Jana Taylor (Alicia Crane), Gene Tyburn (Mark Chambers), James Westerfield (McAvity) To get a diamond for the National Museum, West travels to an eerie island supposedly haunted by a mad dog. While there he becomes reacquainted with an old acquaintance, Sir Nigel Scott, a British detective.
102	22	"The Night of the Cossacks"	Mike Moder	Oliver Crawford	March 21, 1969	3224–0625	A Russian peasant
Guest stars: Guy Stockwell (Prince Gregor), John van Dreelen (Count Balkovitch), Donnelly Rhodes (Captain Zaboff), Nina Foch (Duchess Sophia), Jennifer Douglas (Princess Lina), Aliza Gur (Maria), Oscar Beregi Jr. (Petrovsky), Ivan Triesault (Bishop Kucharyk), Norman Leavitt (Sheriff Corby), Luis de Córdova (Priest), Kay Vojkovic (Serving Girl), Sonny Klein (Sorkhev), Nikita Kranz (Grobe), Tim Burns (Cossack #1), Michael Kriss (Cossack #2) West and Gordon become involved in the affairs of the royal family of Karovnia who have traveled to the United States after fleeing from assassins in their homeland. The agents find themselves pursued by the evil Count Balkovitch, who is looking for an icon he needs to possess in order to hold power in Karovnia. Surprise twist at end re the identity of the main villain.
103	23	"The Night of the Plague"	Irving J. Moore	Story by : Edward Adamson; Teleplay by : Frank Moss	April 4, 1969	3224–0624	Kevin Kemball, an actor
Guest stars: Lana Wood (Averi Trent), William Bryant (Duncan Lansing), Douglas Henderson (Colonel Richmond), Cliff Norton (Drummer), John Hoyt (Guild), Bill Zuckert (Sheriff), James Lanphier (Malcolm), Eddie Firestone (Stillis), Pilar Del Rey (Mexican Matron), Wayne Cochran (Stacey), Steve Raines (Ben), Dan Cass (Olin), Doug Pence (Stagehand), Artt Frank (Drunk Actor), Edward LeVeque (Mexican Peasant), Tyler McVey (Doctor), Flora Plumb (Saloon Girl #1), Jacqueline J. Sayls (Saloon Girl #2), Conrad Falk (Donald, Averi's fiance – who is very unlike Jim West) West deals with the kidnapping of the Governor's daughter while Gordon rushes to find Jim to inoculate him from the disease one of the criminals was carrying.
104	24	"The Night of the Tycoons"	Mike Moder	Story by : Barney Slater; Teleplay by : Louis Vittes	April 11, 1969	3224–0614	(None — Ross Martin does not appear in this episode)
Guest stars: Jo Van Fleet (Amelia Bronston), Joanie Sommers (Kyra Vanders), Steve Carlson (Lionel), Tommy J. Huff (Clown Thug), Dick Cangey (Clown Thug), Red West (Clown Thug), Tol Avery (Gorhan), Richard O'Brien (Van Cleve), Lee Duncan (Bartender), E.A. Sirianni (O'Brien), Milton Parsons (Kessel), Nelson Welch (Board Member #5), Virginia Peters (Matron), Mary Garcia (Honey), Mike Mahoney (Head Guard), Buff Brady (Butler), Jerry Mann (Board member #6), Cal Currens (Businessman), Michelle Breeze (Melanie) West discovers that several members of the Jupiter Corporation have recently died. All were involved in a scheme to dump stock, cause a panic, and make tons of money off of the cheap stock.

=== Television movies (1979–80) ===
Ten years after the cancellation of The Wild Wild West Robert Conrad and Ross Martin reunited and reprised their respective roles as government agents James West and Artemus Gordon in a television reunion film, The Wild Wild West Revisited. This film proved to be one of CBS' highest rated specials of the year, thus warranting a second reunion film, More Wild Wild West. The second film, however, proved less successful.

These two reunion movies were produced by Robert Jacks and directed by Burt Kennedy and are notably more comical than the original series.

Title	Directed by	Written by	Original release date
The Wild Wild West Revisited	Burt Kennedy	William Bowers	May 9, 1979
Guest star: Paul Williams (Dr. Miguelito Loveless Jr.), Harry Morgan (Robert T. "Skinny" Malone), Jo Ann Harris (Carmelita Loveless), Trisha Noble (Penelope Devaraux, British Intelligence), Jeff MacKay (Hugo Kaufman), Susan Blu (Gabrielle Jackson), Robert Shields (Alan – Miguelito's $600 bionic man), Lorene Yarnell (Sonia – Miguelito's $600 bionic woman), René Auberjonois (Captain Sir David Edney), Wilford Brimley (President Grover Cleveland), Ted Hartley (Tsar Nicholas of Russia), Jacquelyn Hyde (Queen Victoria), Alberto Morin (King Alphonso) In 1885, former agents James West and Artemus Gordon are called out of retirement by the secret service to battle Miguelito Loveless Jr., the son of their old nemesis (Died 1880), who has developed an atomic bomb and also managed to replace the crowned heads of England, Spain, and Russia with exact duplicates who are under his control.
More Wild Wild West	Burt Kennedy	William Bowers (credit on some prints: "Teleplay by William Bowers and Tony Kayden; Story by William Bowers")	October 7, 1980
More Wild Wild West	Burt Kennedy	William Bowers (credit on some prints: "Teleplay by William Bowers and Tony Kayden; Story by William Bowers")	October 8, 1980
Guest star: Victor Buono (Dr. Henry Messenger), Jonathan Winters (Albert Paradine Second), René Auberjonois (Colonel Sir David Edney), Avery Schreiber (Russian Ambassador), Dave Madden (German Ambassador), Liz Torres (Juanita), Candi Brough (Daphne), Randi Brough (Yvonne), Harry Morgan (Robert T. "Skinny" Malone), Hector Elias (Spanish Ambassador), Gino Conforti (French Ambassador), Joe Alfasa (Italian Ambassador) In 1890 West and Gordon again come out of retirement to defeat Professor Albert Paradine II, a brilliant madman who seeks world power with weapons of doom. (atomic bomb)

== Emmy Awards ==
During its four-year run The Wild Wild West received three Emmy nominations:

Emmy Awards
Year	Film	Result	Award	Category
1965	Ted Voigtlander for The Wild Wild West; Episode: "The Night of the Howling Light"	Nominated	Primetime; Emmy Award	Best Cinematography
1967	Agnes Moorehead for The Wild Wild West; Episode: "The Night of the Vicious Valentine"	Won	Primetime; Emmy Award	Outstanding Supporting Actress – Drama series
1969	Ross Martin for The Wild Wild West	Nominated	Primetime; Emmy Award	Outstanding Lead Actor – Drama series

== Home releases ==
The entire four-season run of The Wild Wild West is available on DVD from Paramount Home Video in both individual box sets of each season as well as a box containing the whole series. However, only the latter contains the reunion films.

The Wild Wild West DVD releases
Season	Episodes	Discs	Originally aired	Region 1
1	28	7	1965–66	June 6, 2006
2	28	7	1966–67	March 20, 2007
3	24	6	1967–68	November 20, 2007
4	24	6	1968–69	March 18, 2008
Entire series (box set)	104 + 2 reunion movies	27	1965–69	November 4, 2008

== Producers ==
The Wild Wild West had six different producers during the course of its four-season run, plus a seventh for the two reunion movies. A breakdown of the episodes and their producers appears in the chart below.

Producer	Season				TVM	Total
Producer	One	Two	Three	Four	TVM	Total
Gene L. Coon	7	0	0	0	0	7
Fred Freiberger	10	0	0	0	0	10
Michael Garrison	3	7	0	0	0	10
Robert Jacks	0	0	0	0	2	2
Bruce Lansbury	0	21	24	24	0	69
John Mantley	7	0	0	0	0	7
Collier Young	3	0	0	0	0	3
Total	28	28	24	24	2	106

== Directors ==
The Wild Wild West employed a large number of directors during its run, with Irving J. Moore directing the most episodes (25 total).

Of note is that three episodes were directed by William Witney, who had co-directed many "cliffhangers" during the 1930s and 1940s, including Zorro Rides Again, The Lone Ranger and The Adventures of Captain Marvel. Also among the series directors are Mark Rydell (who would go on to direct On Golden Pond with Katharine Hepburn, Henry Fonda and Jane Fonda) and Richard Donner (later to direct The Omen, Superman, and the Lethal Weapon series).

Director	Season				TVM	Total
Director	One	Two	Three	Four	TVM	Total
Justin Addiss	1	0	0	0	0	1
Leon Benson	0	1	0	0	0	1
Michael Caffrey	0	0	2	1	0	3
Marvin Chomsky	0	0	4	7	0	11
James B. Clark	0	0	3	1	0	4
Alan Crosland, Jr.	1	7	4	0	0	12
Edwin Dein	2	0	0	0	0	2
Lawrence Dobkin	0	0	1	0	0	1
Richard Donner	2	1	0	0	0	3
Alvin Ganzer	1	0	0	0	0	1
Harvey Hart	1	0	0	0	0	1
Gunner Hellstrom	0	0	2	0	0	2
Jesse Hibbs	0	1	0	0	0	1
Lee H. Katzin	1	0	0	0	0	1
Lou Katzman	1	0	0	0	0	1
Burt Kennedy	0	0	0	0	2	2
Bernie Kowalski	1	0	0	0	0	1
Sherman Marks	0	1	0	0	0	1
Bernard McEveety	0	0	0	2	0	2
Mike Moder	0	0	1	3	0	4
Irving J. Moore	7	7	5	6	0	25
Alex Nicol	0	0	2	1	0	3
Lawrence Peerce	0	1	0	0	0	1
Charles R. Rondeau	0	3	0	1	0	4
Mark Rydell	1	0	0	0	0	1
Richard Sarafinan	2	0	0	0	0	2
Ralph Senensky	1	1	0	0	0	2
Robert Sparr	0	5	0	0	0	5
Paul Stanley	0	0	0	1	0	1
Don Taylor	2	0	0	0	0	2
Herb Wallerstein	0	0	0	1	0	1
Paul Wedkos	1	0	0	0	0	1
Richard Whorf	1	0	0	0	0	1
William Witney	2	0	0	0	0	2
Total	28	28	24	24	2	106

== Guest stars ==
During its run, The Wild Wild West featured a large number of notable guest stars. Many of these guests also appeared on Star Trek. These actors and the titles to the episodes of both series that they appeared in are listed below.

Actor	The Wild Wild West	Star Trek
John Abbott	The Night of the Simian Terror	Errand of Mercy
Sharon Acker	The Night of the Sedgewick Curse	The Mark of Gideon
Larry Anthony	The Night of the Tartar	Dagger of the Mind
Barry Atwater	The Night of the Camera	The Savage Curtain
Emily Banks	The Night of the Avaricious Actuary	Shore Leave
Arthur Batanides	The Night of the Death-Maker; The Night of the Gypsy Peril; The Night of Miguelito's Revenge; The Night of the Dancing Death	That Which Survives
Eli Behar	The Night of the Legion of Death	Dagger of the Mind
Lee Bergere	The Night of the Colonel's Ghost	The Savage Curtain
Alan Bergmann	The Night of the Ready-Made Corpse	The Empath
Antoinette Bower	The Night of the Sudden Death	Catspaw
Kathie Browne	The Night of the Human Trigger; The Night of the Colonel's Ghost	Wink of an Eye
William Campbell	The Night of the Freebooters	The Squire of Gothos; The Trouble with Tribbles
Fred Carson	The Night of the Bottomless Pit	Operation -- Annihilate!
Anthony Caruso	The Night Dr. Loveless Died; The Night of the Green Terror; The Night of the Kraken	A Piece of the Action
Paul Comi	The Night of the Circus of Death; The Night of the Ready-Made Corpse	Balance of Terror
Elisha Cook Jr.	The Night of the Double-Edged Knife; The Night of the Bars of Hell	Court Martial
Jeff Corey	The Night of the Thousand Eyes; The Night of the Underground Terror	The Cloud Minders
Chuck Courtney	The Night of the Death Masks; The Night of the Winged Terror	Patterns of Force
Yvonne Craig	The Night of the Grand Emir	Whom Gods Destroy
John Crawford	The Night of Fire and Brimstone	The Galileo Seven
Maryesther Denver	The Night of Miguelito's Revenge	Catspaw
Lee Duncan	The Night of the Tycoons	Elaan of Troyius
Michael Dunn	The Night the Wizard Shook the Earth; The Night That Terror Stalked the Town; The Night of the Whirring Death; The Night of the Murderous Spring; The Night of the Raven; The Night of the Green Terror; The Night of the Surreal McCoy; The Night of the Bogus Bandits; The Night Dr. Loveless Died; The Night of Miguelito's Revenge	Plato's Stepchildren
Marj Dusay	The Night of the Kraken; The Night of the Turncoat	Spock's Brain
Jason Evers	The Night of the Kraken; The Night of the Running Death	Wink of an Eye
Morgan Farley	The Night of the Circus of Death; The Night of the Golden Cobra; The Night of the Egyptian Queen	The Return of the Archons; The Omega Glory
Brioni Farrell	The Night of the Brain	The Return of the Archons
Paul Fix	The Night of the Green Terror; The Night of the Hangman	Where No Man Has Gone Before
James Gregory	The Night of the Inferno	Dagger of the Mind
John Harmon	The Night of the Infernal Machine	The City on the Edge of Forever; A Piece of the Action
Johnny Haymer	The Night of the Vipers	All Our Yesterdays
Robert Herron	The Night of the Skulls	The Cage; Charlie X The Savage Curtain
Marianna Hill	The Night of the Bogus Bandits	Dagger of the Mind
Patrick Horgan	The Night of the Diva	Patterns of Force
Vince Howard	The Night of the Cadre	The Man Trap
John Hoyt	The Night of the Plague; The Night of the Puppeteer	The Cage
Sherry Jackson	The Night of the Gruesome Games; The Night of the Vicious Valentine	What Are Little Girls Made Of?
Anthony Jochim	The Night of the Sedgewick Curse	The Cage
Bart LaRue	The Night of the Juggernaut	Patterns of Force; Bread and Circuses; The Savage Curtain
Mark Lenard	The Night of the Iron Fist	Balance of Terror; Journey to Babel
Perry Lopez	The Night of the Feathered Fury; The Night of the Pistoleros	Shore Leave
John Lormer	The Night of the Infernal Machine; The Night of the Spanish Curse; The Night of the Bleak Island	The Cage; The Return of the Archons; For the World is Hollow and I Have Touched the Sky
Hal Lynch	The Night of the Poisonous Posey	Tomorrow is Yesterday
Ken Lynch	The Night of the Returning Dead	The Devil in the Dark
Barbara Luna	The Night of the Deadly Bed	Mirror, Mirror
Theo Marcuse	The Night of the Sudden Plague; The Night of the Bottomless Pit; The Night of the Headless Woman	Catspaw
Sarah Marshall	The Night of the Hangman	The Deadly Years
William Marshall	The Night of the Egyptian Queen	The Ultimate Computer
Arlene Martel	The Night of the Circus of Death	Amok Time
Charles Macauley	The Night of Fire and Brimstone	The Return of the Archons
Judy McConnell	The Night of the Death Masks	Wolf in the Fold
Oliver McGowan	The Night of the Feathered Fury	Shore Leave
Ricardo Montalbán	The Night of the Lord of Limbo	Space Seed
Byron Morrow	The Night of Miguelito's Revenge	Amok Time; For the World is Hollow and I Have Touched the Sky
Reggie Nalder	The Night of the Gruesome Games	Journey to Babel
William O'Connell	The Night of the Pistoleros	Journey to Babel
Susan Oliver	The Night Dr. Loveless Died	The Cage
Gregg Palmer	The Night of the Human Trigger; The Night of the Gruesome Games; The Night of the Hangman	Spectre of the Gun
Leslie Parrish	The Night the Wizard Shook the Earth; The Night of the Flying Pie Plate	Who Mourns for Adonais?
Ed Peck	The Night of the Double-Edged Knife	Tomorrow is Yesterday
Jack Perkins	The Night of the Ready-Made Corpse	Bread and Circuses
Vic Perrin	The Night of the Winged Terror	The Changeling; Mirror, Mirror
Phillip Pine	The Night of the Glowing Corpse	The Savage Curtain
Paul Prokop	The Night of the Firebrand	Mirror, Mirror
Madlyn Rhue	The Night of the Bubbling Death	Space Seed
Jay Robinson	The Night of the Sedgewick Curse	Elaan of Troyius
Percy Rodrigues	The Night of the Poisonous Posy	Court Martial
Joseph Ruskin	The Night of The Fatal Trap; The Night of the Falcon	The Gamesters of Triskelion
Alfred Ryder	The Night of the Torture Chamber; The Night of the Deadly Bubble	The Man Trap
William Schallert	The Night of the Bubbling Death; The Night of the Gruesome Games; The Night of the Winged Terror	The Trouble with Tribbles
Sabrina Scharf	The Night of the Underground Terror	The Paradise Syndrome
Pilar Seurat	The Night the Dragon Screamed	Wolf in the Fold
Judi Sherven	The Night of the Avaricious Actuary; The Night of the Circus of Death	Wolf in the Fold
Sandra Smith	The Night of the Vipers	Turnabout Intruder
Maggie Thrett	The Night of the Freebooters, The Night of the Running Death	Mudd's Women
Malachi Throne	The Night of the Tartar	The Cage (voice only); The Menagerie
Tom Sebastian	The Night of the Amnesiac; The Night of the Skulls	Shore Leave
Harry Townes	The Night of the Double-Edged Knife; The Night of the Tottering Tontine	The Return of the Archons
Tom Troupe	The Night of the Egyptian Queen	Arena
John Warburton	The Night of the Brain	Balance of Terror
William Windom	The Night of the Flying Pie Plate	The Doomsday Machine
William Wintersole	The Night of the Tottering Tontine	Patterns of Force
Venita Wolf	The Night of the Arrow	The Squire of Gothos
Celeste Yarnell	The Night of a Thousand Eyes	The Apple

Some guest stars who appeared only on The Wild Wild West were:

- Charles Aidman - (The Night of the Camera, The Night of Miguelito's Revenge, The Night of the Pelican, The Night of the Janus)
- Edward Andrews - (The Night of the Brain)
- John Astin - (The Night of the Tartar)
- Vincent Beck - (The Night of the Pelican)
- Henry Beckman - (The Night of the Torture Chamber, The Night of the Vicious Valentine)
- Ed Begley - (The Night of the Infernal Machine)
- Lloyd Bochner - (The Night of the Puppeteer)
- Victor Buono - (The Night of the Inferno, The Night of the Eccentrics, The Night of the Feathered Fury)
- Walter Burke - (The Night of the Cut-Throats)
- Joseph Campanella - (The Night of the Wolf)
- Michele Carey - (The Night of the Feathered Fury, The Night of the Winged Terror: Parts 1 & 2)
- Christopher Cary - (The Night of the Poisonous Posey, The Night of the Winged Terror: Parts 1 & 2)
- Sammy Davis Jr. - (The Night of the Returning Dead)
- John Dehner - (Night of the Casual Killer, The Night of the Steel Assassin)
- Khigh Dhiegh - (The Night of the Samurai, The Night of the Pelican)
- Bradford Dillman - (The Night of the Cut-Throats)
- Phoebe Dorin - (The Night the Wizard Shook the Earth, The Night That Terror Stalked the Town, The Night of the Whirring Death, The Night of the Murderous Spring, The Night of the Raven, The Night of the Green Terror)
- John Doucette - (The Night of the Flaming Ghost, The Night of the Surreal McCoy)
- Robert Drivas - (The Night of the Burning Diamond)
- Robert Duvall - (The Night of the Falcon)
- Anthony Eisley - (The Night of the Eccentrics, The Night of the Janus)
- Robert Ellenstein - (The Night of the Flaming Ghost, The Night Dr. Loveless Died, The Night of the Gruesome Games, The Night of the Winged Terror: Parts 1 & 2)
- Roy Engel - (The Night of the Steel Assassin, The Night of the Colonel's Ghost, The Night of the Arrow, The Night of the Death-Maker, The Night of the Big Blackmail, The Night of the Winged Terror: Part 1)
- Bernard Fox - (The Night of the Winged Terror: Part 1)
- Beverly Garland - (The Night of the Cut-Throats, The Night of the Bleak Island)
- Lisa Gaye - (The Night of the Skulls, The Night of the Falcon)
- Don Gordon - (The Night of the Cadre)
- Harold Gould - (The Night of the Bubbling Death, The Night of the Avaricious Actuary)
- Kevin Hagen - (The Night of the Amnesiac)
- Alan Hale Jr. - (The Night of the Sabatini Death)
- Hurd Hatfield - (The Night of the Man-Eating House, The Night of the Undead)
- Douglas Henderson - (The Night of the Skulls, The Night of the Falcon, The Night of the Turncoat, The Night of the Underground Terror, The Night of the Death Masks, The Night of the Fugitives, The Night of Miguelito's Revenge, The Night of the Sabatini Death, The Night of the Diva, The Night of the Plague)
- Boris Karloff - (The Night of the Golden Cobra)
- Sandy Kenyon - (The Night of Sudden Death)
- Richard Kiel - (The Night the Wizard Shook the Earth, The Night That Terror Stalked the Town, The Night of the Whirring Death, The Night of the Simian Terror)
- Harvey Korman - (The Night of the Big Blackmail)
- Martin Landau - (The Night of the Red-Eyed Madmen)
- Ronald Long - (The Night of the Gypsy Peril)
- Ida Lupino - (The Night Of The Big Blast)
- John Marley - (The Night of the Wolf)
- Scott Marlowe - (The Night of the Howling Light)
- Kevin McCarthy - (The Night of the Doomsday Formula)
- Burgess Meredith - (The Night of the Human Trigger)
- Agnes Moorehead - (The Night of the Vicious Valentine)
- Priscilla Morrill - (The Night of the Undead)
- Leslie Nielsen - (The Night of the Double-Edged Knife)
- Carroll O'Connor - (The Night of the Ready-Made Corpse)
- Nehemiah Persoff - (The Night of the Inferno, The Night of the Deadly Blossom, The Night of the Underground Terror)
- Ford Rainey - (The Night of the Flying Pie Plate, The Night of the Iron Fist, The Night of the Kraken)
- Pernell Roberts - (The Night of the Firebrand)
- Don Rickles - (The Night of the Druid's Blood)
- Lorri Scott - (The Night of the Wolf)
- William Talman - (The Night of the Man-Eating House)
- Sigrid Valdis - (The Night the Wizard Shook the Earth, The Night of the Torture Chamber)
- Donald Woods - (The Night of the Skulls, The Night of the Assassin)
- H.M. Wynant - (The Night of the Torture Chamber, The Night of the Sudden Plague, The Night of the Poisonous Posey, The Night of the Simian Terror)
- Keenan Wynn - (The Night of the Freebooters)
- John Zaremba - (The Night of the Undead)

Some guest stars who only appeared on Star Trek were:

- Michael Ansara - (Day of the Dove)
- Lou Antonio - (Let That Be Your Last Battlefield)
- Barbara Babcock - (A Taste of Armageddon, Plato's Stepchildren)
- Whit Bissell - (The Trouble with Tribbles)
- Joan Collins - (The City on the Edge of Forever)
- James Daly - (Requiem for Methuselah)
- Diana Ewing - (The Cloud Minders)
- Michael Forest - (Who Mourns for Adonais?)
- Frank Gorshin - (Let That Be Your Last Battlefield)
- Skip Homeier - (Patterns of Force, The Way to Eden)
- Sally Kellerman - (Where No Man Has Gone Before)
- Nancy Kovack - (A Private Little War)
- Don Marshall - (The Galileo Seven)
- Lee Meriwether - (That Which Survives)
- Charles Napier - (The Way to Eden)
- Julie Newmar - (Friday's Child)
- Warren Stevens - (By Any Other Name)
- Robert Walker Jr - (Charlie X)
- Kenneth Washington - (That Which Survives)
