= Wild Wild West: The Steel Assassin =

1999 video game

- Developer: SouthPeak Interactive
- Publishers: NA: SouthPeak Interactive; EU: Ubi Soft
- Producer: Jim Simmons
- Designers: Lee Sheldon; Doug Walker
- Programmer: Doug Walker
- Artist: Jeff McFall
- Platform: Microsoft Windows
- Release: NA: December 7, 1999; EU: 2000
- Genre: Action-adventure
- Mode: Single-player

Wild Wild West: The Steel Assassin is an action-adventure video game published and developed by SouthPeak Interactive for Microsoft Windows. It is based on the 1999 film of the same name (which in turn is based on the 1960s TV series The Wild Wild West, whose episode "Night of the Steel Assassin" shares its name with the game). A PlayStation version of the game was planned, but was cancelled.

== Gameplay ==
The game sees the player as either West or Gordon in a fully interactive 3D world where he interacts with the characters and objects via hotspots. Puzzles need to be completed in order to advance through the story.

== Plot ==
Five years after the assassination of Abraham Lincoln, the tension between the North and the South is rising again. President Ulysses S. Grant has received a death threat and it's up to U.S. Army Captain James "Jim" T. West and U.S. Marshal Artemus Gordon to save him.

== Development ==
The game used the NetImmerse game engine from Numerical Design Ltd.

== Reception ==
Reception

Aggregate score
Aggregator	Score
GameRankings	55%

Review scores
Publication	Score
AllGame	1.5/5
CNET Gamecenter	7/10
Computer Games Strategy Plus	3/5
Computer Gaming World	2/5
EP Daily	7/10
GamePro	3.5/5
GameSpot	5.1/10
GameSpy	25%
GameZone	8.4/10
IGN	7/10
Next Generation	1/5
PC Accelerator	4/10
PC Gamer (US)	60%

The game received "mixed" reviews according to the review aggregation website GameRankings. Jim Preston of NextGen said that the game was "better than a rattlesnake in your boot."
