= Sharon Cintron =

American model and actress

- Cintron in 1965

Playboy centerfold appearance
- May 1963
- Preceded by: Sandra Settani
- Succeeded by: Connie Mason

Personal details
- Born: January 16, 1945 Perth Amboy, New Jersey, U.S.
- Died: July 31, 2017 (aged 72) Prescott, Arizona, U.S.
- Height: 5 ft 4 in (1.63 m)

Sharon Cintron (January 16, 1945 – July 31, 2017) was an American model and actress. She was Playboy magazine's Playmate of the Month for its May 1963 issue. Her centerfold was photographed by Mario Casilli. She later held a recurring role on the TV series Baretta.

== Filmography ==
=== Films ===
- How Sweet It Is! (1968) .... Agatzi Girl

=== Television ===
- "Kaz"- "A Little Shuck and a Whole Lotta Jive" (1978-09-10)
- "Baretta"
  - "Woman Trouble" (1978-03-23) .... Mimi
  - "Just for Laughs" (1978-02-09) .... Mimi
  - "New Girl in Town" (1977-09-28) .... Mimi
  - "Everybody Pays the Fare" (1977-02-23) .... Mimi
  - "Don't Kill the Sparrow" (1977-01-12) .... Mimi
  - "Can't Win for Losin'" (1976-12-15) .... Mimi
  - "Shoes" (1976-10-27) .... Mimi
  - "They Don't Make 'Em Like They Used To" (1976-10-20) .... Mimi
  - "Runaway Cowboy" (1976-10-06) - Mimi
  - "Dead Man Out" (1976-03-03) - Mimi
  - "The Blood Bond" (1976-02-18) - Mimi
  - "Murder for Me" (1976-01-14) - Mimi
  - "When Dues Come Down" (1975-11-12) - Mimi
  - "The Fire Man" (1975-10-08) - Mimi
  - "The Secret of Terry Lake" (1975-04-16) - Mimi
- "Quincy"
  - "Snake Eyes: Part 1" (1977) .... Stormy
  - "Snake Eyes: Part 2" (1977) .... Stormy
- "The Blue Knight" - "A Slight Case of Murder" (1976) .... Hooker
- "The Rockford Files" - "The No-Cut Contract" (1976) .... Sharon
- Aloha Means Goodbye (1974) (TV movie).... File Nurse
- The Chadwick Family (1974) (TV movie) .... Nurse
- Evil Roy Slade (1972) (uncredited) (TV movie) .... Young Woman kissed by Evil Roy while robbing bank
- "Mannix" - "Bang, Bang, You're Dead" (1970) .... Miss Parks
- "The Wild Wild West"
  - "The Night of the Avaricious Actuary" (1968) .... Girl #1
  - "The Night of the Cutthroats" (1967) .... Waiting Lady
  - "The Night of the Circus of Death" (1967) .... Secretary
- "Get Smart" - "With Love and Twitches (1968) .... Waitress
- "The Monkees" - "Some Like It Lukewarm" (1968) .... Maxine
- "Burke's Law" - "Who Killed Molly?" (1964) .... 1st Stripper

== Quote ==
"I want to be a hair stylist because I like styling hair. And the money is good. Why try to be a starlet and starve?"

== See also ==
- List of people in Playboy 1960–1969

Judi Monterey	Toni Ann Thomas	Adrienne Moreau	Sandra Settani	Sharon Cintron	Connie Mason
Carrie Enwright	Phyllis Sherwood	Victoria Valentino	Christine Williams	Terre Tucker	Donna Michelle
