= Michael McCloud =

American folk singer and songwriter

Michael McCloud (born 1947) is the stage name of Michael Snyder, an American folk singer and songwriter who regularly performed at the Schooner Wharf Bar in Key West, Florida for over 30 years, ending in 2023.

His album Ain't Life Grand features the lead guitar playing of the late "Doctor" George Turner.

He gained national attention after filing a formal complaint for copyright infringement against country music star Toby Keith in 2006. McCloud claimed that Keith's 2003 hit song "I Love This Bar" was copied largely from McCloud's work, "Tourist Town Bar."

In 2009, McCloud released volumes 1 and 2 of his CD, Live As I Can Be.

In April 2023, McCloud retired and moved to Tucson, Arizona to be closer to his daughter and grandchild.
