= Dragnet (radio series) =

Police procedural drama

- Genre: Police procedural
- Running time: 30 minutes
- Country of origin: United States
- Language: English
- Home station: NBC
- TV adaptations: Dragnet (franchise)
- Starring: Jack Webb; Barton Yarborough; Barney Phillips; Harry Bartell; Herb Ellis; Vic Perrin; Ben Alexander; Charles McGraw; Raymond Burr; Harry Morgan; Tol Avery; Various
- Announcer: George Fenneman; Hal Gibney
- Created by: Jack Webb
- Written by: Jack Webb; Various
- Original release: 3 June 1949 – 26 July 1957
- No. of seasons: 9
- No. of episodes: 314 (List of episodes)

Dragnet is an American radio series, enacting the cases of a dedicated Los Angeles police detective, Sergeant Joe Friday, and his partners. The show took its name from the police term "dragnet", meaning a system of coordinated measures for apprehending criminals or suspects.

Dragnet gave audience members a feel for the daily work of police officers and earned praise for improving the public opinion of police officers.

Actor and producer Jack Webb's aims in Dragnet were for realism and unpretentious acting. He achieved both goals, and Dragnet remains a key influence on subsequent police dramas in many media.

The show's theme music, Danger Ahead, with its distinctive ominous, four-note brass and tympani introduction, was composed by Walter Schumann. It is derived from Miklós Rózsa's score for the 1946 film version of The Killers. Another Dragnet trademark is the show's opening narration: "Ladies and gentlemen: the story you are about to hear is true. Only the names have been changed to protect the innocent." This underwent minor revisions over time. The "only" and "ladies and gentlemen" were dropped at some point. Variations on this narration have been featured in subsequent crime dramas, and in parodies of the dramas (e.g. "Only the facts have been changed to protect the guilty").

The radio series was the first entry in a Dragnet media franchise encompassing film, television, books and comics.

== History and creation ==
Dragnet was created and produced by Jack Webb, who stars as stoic Sergeant Joe Friday. Webb had starred in a few mostly short-lived radio programs, Pat Novak, for Hire, Johnny Madero, Pier 23, Jeff Regan, Investigator, Murder and Mr. Malone, and Pete Kelly's Blues. Dragnet would make him a major media personality in his era.

Dragnet originated from Webb's small role as a police forensic scientist in the 1948 film He Walked by Night, inspired by the 1946 violent crime spree of Erwin Walker, a disturbed World War II veteran and former Glendale, California, police department employee. The film told the story in semidocumentary style, with technical advice from Marty Wynn, a sergeant from the Robbery Division of the Los Angeles Police Department (LAPD). Inspired by Wynn's accounts of actual cases and criminal investigative procedure, Webb convinced Wynn that day-to-day activities of police officers could be realistically depicted in a broadcast series, without the forced melodrama of the numerous private-detective serials then common in radio. The film contributed two phrases to the Dragnet television series: the opening text overlay stating that the story was true and "only the names are changed—to protect the innocent", immediately followed by establishing shots of Los Angeles with the narration "This is the city: Los Angeles, California."

Webb frequently visited police headquarters, rode along on night patrols with Sgt. Wynn and his partner Officer Vance Brasher, and attended Police Academy courses to research authentic jargon and procedural details. When he proposed Dragnet to NBC officials, they were not especially impressed; radio was aswarm with private investigators and crime dramas, such as Webb's earlier Pat Novak for Hire. That program was short lived, but Webb was praised for his role as the titular private eye, and NBC agreed to a limited run for Dragnet.

With writer James E. Moser, Webb prepared an audition recording, then sought the LAPD's cooperation; he wanted to dramatize cases from official files to portray the reality of police investigations. The official response was initially lukewarm, but in 1949 LAPD Chief Clemence B. Horrall gave Webb his approval. Police wanted control over the program's sponsor, and insisted that police not be depicted unflatteringly. This would lead to criticism, as less flattering aspects of the LAPD, such as its racial segregation policies, were never addressed.

=== Premiere ===
Jack Webb in an advertisement for Fatima Cigarettes, c. 1951. The now defunct Fatima brand was the primary sponsor of the early Dragnet radio episodes from 1949 to 1952.

Dragnet debuted inauspiciously. The early months were bumpy, as the program was as yet unable to attract a sponsor and the budget was limited, forcing Webb to employ relatively few radio actors. The network originally stressed a shrill, strident tone as popularized on rival show Gang Busters (the earliest Dragnet episodes mimic the Gang Busters opening, with an announcer shouting "Draaaaag...net!"). Webb put a stop to this after only a few episodes, with a different announcer adopting a more deadpan delivery. Webb also discovered how versatile his actors were, and kept them on hand week after week. Barton Yarborough was there for every episode as Webb's partner, with character roles played variously by Harry Bartell, Vic Perrin, Virginia Gregg, Herb Butterfield, Jack Kruschen, Peggy Webber, Herb Ellis, Barney Phillips, and Clarence Cassell. All these radio performers continued into the Dragnet television series. During the radio show's first year, Raymond Burr played chief of detectives Ed Backstrand.

Jack Webb and company worked out the format and grew into their characters. Friday was originally portrayed as more brash and forceful than his later, usually flat demeanor. Gradually, Friday's earnest, fast-talking persona emerged, described by John Dunning as "a cop's cop, tough but not hard, conservative but caring." Friday's first partner was Sergeant Ben Romero, portrayed by Barton Yarborough, a longtime radio actor. After Yarborough's death in 1951 (corresponding to Romero's death of a heart attack on the December 27, 1951, episode "The Big Sorrow"), Friday was partnered with Sergeant Ed Jacobs (December 27, 1951 – April 10, 1952, subsequently transferred to the police academy as an instructor), played by Barney Phillips; Officer Bill Lockwood (Ben Romero's nephew, April 17, 1952 – May 8, 1952), played by Martin Milner (with Ken Peters taking the role for the June 12, 1952 episode "The Big Donation"); and finally Frank Smith (introduced in "The Big Safe", May 1, 1952), played originally by Herb Ellis (1952), then Ben Alexander (1952–1959). Alexander would reprise the role of Smith for the initial television version and the 1954 film, making him Friday's longest-serving partner in all the franchise's media.

When Dragnet hit its stride, it became one of radio's top-rated shows. Webb insisted on realism. The dialogue was clipped, understated, and sparse, influenced by the hardboiled school of crime fiction. Scripts were fast-moving but did not seem rushed. Every aspect of police work was chronicled, step by step: from patrols and paperwork, to crime scene investigation, lab work, and questioning witnesses or suspects. The detectives’ personal lives rarely took center stage, though it was mentioned that Friday was a bachelor who lived with his mother, and Romero was a Mexican-American from Texas, an ever-fretful husband and father. "Underplaying is still acting", Webb told Time. "We try to make it as real as a guy pouring a cup of coffee." Los Angeles police chiefs Clemence B. Horrall, William A. Worton, and later William H. Parker were credited as consultants, and many police officers were fans.

Most later episodes were entitled "The Big _____", where the key word denoted a person or object in the plot. In numerous episodes, this would be the principal suspect, victim, or physical target of the crime, but in others was often a seemingly inconsequential detail eventually revealed as key evidence in solving the crime. For example, in "The Big Streetcar" the background noise of a passing streetcar helps establish the location of a phone booth used by the suspect.

The series' radio years depict pre-renewal Downtown L.A., with working-class residents frequenting cheap bars, cafes, hotels, and boarding houses. At the climax of the early episode "James Vickers" (September 17, 1949), the chase leads to the Subway Terminal Building, where the robber flees into a tunnel—only to be killed by an oncoming train. By contrast, episodes set in outlying areas show locations far less built up today. The Imperial Highway, extending 40 miles east from El Segundo to Anaheim, is now a heavily used boulevard lined with low-rise commercial development; but in the episode "The Big Chance" (February 4, 1954), scenes on Imperial near "the road to San Pedro" show it as a country highway.

=== Verisimilitude ===
Webb was a stickler for accurate details, and Dragnet used authentic touches such as the LAPD's actual radio call sign (KMA367), and the names of actual department officials, such as Ray Pinker and Lee Jones of the crime lab or Chief of Detectives Thad Brown (later LAPD Chief 1967–1969).

Two announcers were used. Episodes began with announcer George Fenneman intoning the opening ("The story you are about to hear is true; only the names have been changed to protect the innocent.") and Hal Gibney describing the premise of the episode. For example, "Big Saint" (April 26, 1951) begins with "You're a detective sergeant. You're assigned to auto theft detail. A well organized ring of car thieves begins operations in your city. It's one of the most puzzling cases you've ever encountered. Your job: break it."

After the first commercial, Gibney would officially introduce the program: "Dragnet, the documented drama of an actual crime. For the next thirty minutes, in cooperation with the Los Angeles Police Department, you will travel step-by-step on the side of the law through an actual case transcribed from official police files. From beginning to end—from crime to punishment—Dragnet is the story of your police force in action." The earliest episodes had an elaborate preamble: "Dragnet, the documented drama of an actual crime, investigated and solved by the men who unrelentingly stand watch on the security of your home, your family and your life", followed by the standard opening.

The story usually began with footsteps, followed by Joe Friday reporting the date and the local weather conditions, followed by the assignment of the day: "We were working the day watch out of Robbery Division. My partner's Ben Romero. The boss is Ed Backstrand, chief of detectives. My name's Friday." Friday would then narrate where he and his partner were going, the time they arrived, followed by a door opening and an elaboration of the location: "I was on my way in to work, and it was 4:58 PM when I got to Room 42 ... (door opening) Homicide." ("The Big String", January 18, 1953)

Friday gave voice-over narration throughout, noting the time, date and place of every scene as he and his partners went through their day investigating the crime. The events of a given episode might occur in hours, or might span a few months. At least one episode unfolded in real time: in "City Hall Bombing" (July 21, 1949), Friday and Romero had less than thirty minutes to stop a man threatening an explosion. In one episode, "The Big Ben" (March 15, 1951), Friday was shot and hospitalized, and Romero took over the voice-over narration for the remainder of the episode.

At the end of the episode, usually after a brief pitch by Jack Webb for the sponsor's product, announcer Hal Gibney would return to relate the fate of the suspect, usually tried in "Department 187 of the Superior Court of the State of California in and for the city of Los Angeles, convicted of a crime and sent (in most episodes) to "the State Penitentiary, San Quentin California", or "examined by psychiatrists appointed by the court", judged mentally incompetent and "committed to a state mental hospital for an indefinite period". Murderers were often "executed in the manner prescribed by law" or "executed in the lethal gas chamber at the State Penitentiary, San Quentin California". Occasionally, police pursued the wrong suspect, and criminals sometimes avoided justice or escaped, at least on the radio Dragnet. In 1950, Time quoted Webb: "We don't even try to prove that crime doesn't pay ... sometimes it does."

Special terminology was mentioned in every episode but rarely explained. Webb trusted the audience to understand terms by their context and tried to avoid stilted exposition. Some specialized terms such as "A.P.B." for "All Points Bulletin" and "M.O." for "Modus Operandi" were introduced into popular culture by Dragnet.

While most radio shows used one or two sound-effect experts, Dragnet used five: a show lasting 30 minutes could require up to 300 effects. Accuracy was underlined: the exact number of footsteps from one room to another at Los Angeles police headquarters were mimicked, and when a telephone rang at Friday's desk, the listener heard the same ring as the telephones in the actual headquarters. A single minute of ".22 Rifle for Christmas" illustrates the evocative sound effects; while Friday and others investigate bloodstains in a suburban backyard, the listener hears a series of overlapping effects: a squeaking gate hinge, footsteps, an investigator scraping blood into a paper envelope, the glassy chime of chemical vials, bird calls, and a dog barking in the distance.

Sometimes the mundane intruded. When shows ran short, directors stalled for time, as in "The Big Crime", where a real-estate agent spent a full minute answering and explaining a phone call.

The earliest radio programs ended each week with a remembrance of fallen officers who died on the job from all over the country, read over somber organ music. This was eventually phased out.

=== Topics and themes ===
Scripts tackled topics ranging from the sensational (murders, missing persons and armed robbery) to the mundane (check fraud and shoplifting), yet Dragnet made them all interesting with fast-moving plots and behind-the-scenes realism. In "The Garbage Chute" (December 15, 1949), they even had a locked room mystery.

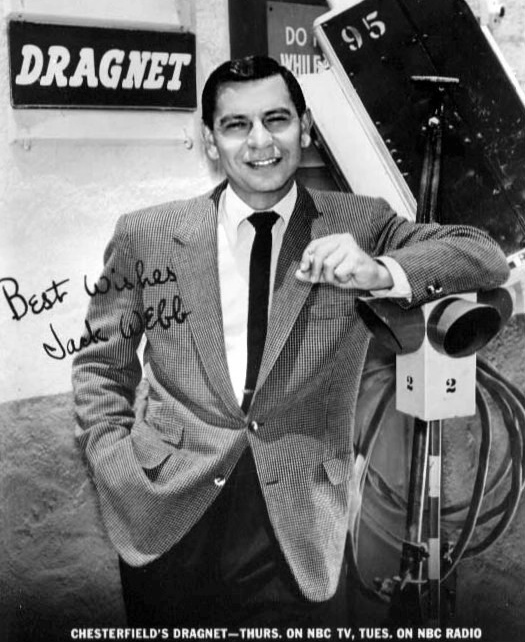
Promotional photo or card sent to viewers and listeners of the program during the time the show was on both radio and television.

Though tame by modern standards, Dragnet—especially on the radio—handled controversial subjects such as sex crimes and drug addiction with unprecedented and even startling realism. In one such example, Dragnet broke an unspoken taboo of popular entertainment in the episode ".22 Rifle for Christmas", which aired December 22, 1949 and repeated at Christmastime for the next three years. The episode followed the search for two young boys, Stanley Johnstone and Stevie Morheim, only to discover Stevie had been accidentally killed while playing with a rifle belonging to Stanley, who was supposed to receive it as a Christmas present but opened the box early. Stanley finally told Friday that Stevie had been running while holding the rifle when he tripped and the gun fatally wounded him. NBC received thousands of letters, mostly positive, according to the book My Name's Friday, though the National Rifle Association protested. Webb forwarded their letter to police chief Parker, who promised "ten more shows illustrating the folly of giving rifles to children".

".22 Rifle for Christmas" was replaced as the series' Christmas story on December 22, 1953, with "The Big Little Jesus", which followed the detectives' investigation of the theft of a statue of the baby Jesus from a church Nativity scene. With its happier ending, this episode was repeated at Christmastime the following year. The late-1960s TV version of Dragnet included a newly produced version of "The Big Little Jesus", which featured Barry Williams (later of The Brady Bunch) as an altar boy.

Another episode dealt with high school girls who, rather than finding Hollywood stardom, fell in with fraudulent talent scouts and ended up in pornography and prostitution. Both this episode and ".22 Rifle for Christmas" were adapted for the television version with few script changes. "The Big Trio" (July 3, 1952) detailed three cases in one episode, including fatal reckless driving by unlicensed juveniles. Webb's anti-drug screeds, continuing through the TV run, would be derided as camp by later audiences; yet his character later showed concern and sympathy for addicts as victims, especially juveniles.

The serious tone was lightened with moments of comic relief: Romero was something of a hypochondriac and often seemed henpecked; Frank Smith continually complained about his brother-in-law Armand; though Friday dated, he usually dodged women who tried to set him up with marriage-minded dates.

Due in part to Webb's fondness for the medium, Dragnet persisted on radio until 1957 (the last two seasons were repeats), making it one of the last old time radio shows to give way to television's growing popularity. A total of 314 original episodes were broadcast from 1949 to 1957. The TV show was designed as a visual version of the radio show, with virtually the same style, including many scripts adapted from radio. The TV show could be listened to without watching, with no loss of understanding of the storyline.

The radio show was also adapted into a comic strip by Mel Keefer.

=== "Just the facts, ma'am" ===
While "Just the facts, ma'am" is known as Dragnet's catchphrase (parodied many times by other productions), the precise phrase was never actually uttered by Joe Friday. The closest lines were "All we want are the facts, ma'am" and "All we know are the facts, ma'am". The phrase did appear in the parody St. George and the Dragonet, a 1953 short audio satire by Stan Freberg. It was also spoken by Ben Alexander in a 1966 cameo appearance on Batman. It was used in the film L.A. Confidential in reference to Badge of Honor, a fictitious TV show modeled on Dragnet.

== Main cast ==
- Jack Webb as Los Angeles Police Department (L.A.P.D) Detective Sergeant Joseph "Joe" Friday
- Barton Yarborough as Friday's partner, Los Angeles Police Department (L.A.P.D) Sergeant Benjamin "Ben" Romero (1949–1951)
- Martin Milner/Ken Peters as Friday's partner Los Angeles Police Department (L.A.P.D.) Detective William "Bill" Lockwood (1951) (Ben Lockwood's one and only television appearance was portrayed by Ken Patterson.)
- Barney Phillips as Friday's partner, Los Angeles Police Department (L.A.P.D) Sergeant Edward "Ed" Jacobs (1952)
- Harry Bartell/Herb Ellis/Vic Perrin/Ken Patterson/Ben Alexander as Friday's longest serving partner in the entire franchise, Los Angeles Police Department (LAPD) Officer Franklin "Frank" Smith (1952–1959) (Ellis also played Smith in five episodes of the TV series, before being replaced by Alexander, who reprised his role alongside Webb for both the 1954 film and in most of the episodes of the original 1951 television show)
- Charles McGraw/Raymond Burr as Los Angeles Police Department (L.A.P.D.) Chief of Detectives Ed Backstrand. (ep 1–28)
- Tol Avery as Los Angeles Police Department (L.A.P.D.) Chief of Detectives Thaddeus "Thad" Franklin Brown (ep 29+)
- Herb Butterfield as Los Angeles Police Department (L.A.P.D.) Scientific Investigation Division (S.I.D) Crime lab technician Lieutenant Leland "Lee" Jones/Various
- Olan Soule as Los Angeles Police Department (L.A.P.D.) Scientific Investigation Division (S.I.D) Crime lab technician Raymond "Ray" Pinker.
- Peggy Webber as Ma Friday, Joe's Mother/Various.

Other Principal Actors: Frank Lovejoy, Paul Frees, Ted DeCorsia, Hans Conried, Homer Welch, Parley Baer, Harry Morgan, Betty Lou Gerson, Herb Vigran, Jeff Chandler, William Johnstone, Tony Barrett, William Conrad, Richard Boone, Whitfield Connor, George McCluskey, Stacy Harris, Charles Smith, Eddie Firestone, Virginia Gregg, Ralph Moody, Helen Kleeb, Jack Kruschen, Marion Richman, Martin Milner, Victor Rodman, Inge Jollos, June Whitley, Gil Stratton, Sam Edwards, Joyce McCluskey, Ken Patterson, Gwen Delano, Cliff Arquette, Sarah Selby, Edwin Bruce, Sammy Ogg, June Whitley, Peter Leeds, Lee Marvin, Carolyn Jones, Jean Tatum, Art Gilmore, Paul Richards, Lillian Buyeff, Irene Tedrow, Michael Ann Barrett, Vivi Janiss, Georgia Ellis & Bert Holland.

== Sources ==
- John Dunning, On The Air: The Encyclopedia of Old-Time Radio, Oxford University Press, 1998, ISBN 0-19-507678-8 pp. 208-211.
