= Jeff Regan, Investigator =

Radio detective drama

- Other names: Joe Canto, Private Eye; Jeff Regan, Private Eye
- Country of origin: United States
- Language: English
- Syndicates: CBS
- Starring: Jack Webb; Frank Graham; Paul Dubov
- Announcer: Bob Stevenson; Bob LeMond; Joe Walters
- Written by: E. Jack Neuman; Larry Roman; Jackson Gillis; William Froug; William Fifield; Gilbert Thomas
- Directed by: Sterling Tracy; Gordon T. Hughes; Cliff Howell
- Produced by: Sterling Tracy; Gordon T. Hughes
- Original release: July 10, 1948 – August 27, 1950

Jeff Regan, Investigator is a radio detective drama that ran on CBS from July 10, 1948 to December 18, 1948, and again from October 5, 1949 to August 27, 1950. The series is one of the earliest nationwide programs to feature Jack Webb.

== Production ==
July 10 to December 18, 1948

The radio detective drama was made at CBS Columbia Square in Hollywood.

On July 10, 1948 the radio detective drama first debuted as Joe Canto, Private Eye. The subsequent week it returned, as Jeff Regan, Private Eye.

Webb, who had previously starred on the Mutual detective drama, Johnny Madero, Pier 23, played the title character, a private investigator working for Anthony J. Lyon (originally Wilms Herbert, later Herb Butterfield) at the International Detective Bureau. In the first incarnation of the series, Lyon was played by Wilms Herbert, while Webb's future Dragnet co-star, Barton Yarborough, played his co-worker, Joe Canto.

This format continued until the end of the year (December 18, 1948), when Webb left the program. According to writer William Froug, Webb was fired for asking for too much money, (a $15 raise). Police Lieutenant Sanduci (Jack Petruzzi) served as a foil to Jeff Regan and could be heard on a number of episodes.

October 5, 1949 to September 3, 1950

The program remained on hiatus for almost a year before being brought back with voice actor Frank Graham portraying Regan. Graham, who was well known both as an announcer and for his versatility, had previously created and starred in his own detective series, The Adventures of Cosmo Jones. Lyon was also recast, with The Jack Benny Program regular Frank Nelson taking over the part. This remained the definitive lineup for the rest of the show's run, although for unknown reasons Paul Dubov filled in for Graham for several weeks.

== Cancellation ==
The second version of Regan remained popular in the ratings and was expected to be renewed for another season. However, Graham committed suicide on September 2, 1950. At the time of his death, five more broadcasts were scheduled for Regan, but they were never completed. Graham had completed an episode scheduled to air the night after he died, but newspaper accounts indicated that CBS chose not to broadcast it. The role of Regan was not recast, resulting in the series ending production permanently.

== Episodes ==
sources:

- The Prodigal Daughter (July 10, 1948)
- The Prodigal Daughter (July 17, 1948)
- The Lonesome Lady (July 24, 1948)
- The Lady with the Golden Hair (July 31, 1948)
- The Man Who Liked Mountains (August 7, 1948)
- The Diamond Quartet (August 14, 1948)
- The Man Who Came Back (August 21, 1948)
- The Man in the Door (August 28, 1948),
- The House by the Sea (September 4, 1948)
- The Story of Cain and Abel and the Santa Maria (September 11, 1948)
- The Gambler and the Lady (September 18, 1948)
- The Lady with No Name (September 25, 1948)
- The Man with the Key (October 2, 1948)
- The Too Many Mrs. Rogers (October 9, 1948)
- The Lost Lady (October 16, 1948)
- Title Unknown (October 23, 1948)
- Fourteen Grand and No Client (October 30, 1948)
- The Lady with Too Much Hair (November 6, 1948)
- The Guy from Gower Gulch (November 13, 1948)
- The Pilgrim’s Progress (November 20, 1948)
- The Man Who Fought Back (November 27, 1948)
- The Lawyer and the Lady (December 4, 1948)
- The Gambler and His Lady (December 11, 1948)
- The Man Who Lived by the Sea (December 18, 1948)
- The Prodigal Daughter (July 17, 1948)
- The Lonesome Lady (July 24, 1948)
- The Lady with the Golden Hair (July 31, 1948)
- The Man Who Liked Mountains (August 7, 1948)
- The Diamond Quartet (August 14, 1948)
- The Man Who Came Back (August 21, 1948)
- The Man in the Door (August 28, 1948),
- The House by the Sea (September 4, 1948)
- The Story of Cain and Abel and the Santa Maria (September 11, 1948)
- The Gambler and the Lady (September 18, 1948)
- The Lady with No Name (September 25, 1948)
- The Man with the Key (October 2, 1948)
- The Too Many Mrs. Rogers (October 9, 1948)
- The Lost Lady (October 16, 1948)
- Title Unknown (October 23, 1948)
- Fourteen Grand and No Client (October 30, 1948)
- The Lady with Too Much Hair (November 6, 1948)
- The Guy from Gower Gulch (November 13, 1948)
- The Pilgrim’s Progress (November 20, 1948)
- The Man Who Fought Back (November 27, 1948)
- The Lawyer and the Lady (December 4, 1948)
- The Gambler and His Lady (December 11, 1948)
- The Man Who Lived by the Sea (December 18, 1948)
- The Lady by the Fountain (October 5, 1949)
- The Man in the Church (October 12, 1949)
- The Lady from Brazil (October 19, 1949)
- The Lady Who Wanted to Live (October 26, 1949)
- The Man in the Black Suit (November 2, 1949)
- The Little Man’s Lament (November 9, 1949)
- The Two Little Sisters (November 16, 1949)
- If I Knew You Were Comin’ I’d Have Wrecked A Train (November 23, 1949)
- Title Unknown (November 30, 1949)
- The Hundred Dollar Guy (December 7, 1949)
- The Friday Night Off (December 14, 1949)
- Some Enchanted Car-Hop (December 21, 1949)
- The Man on the Hook (December 28, 1949)
- Not Quite a Thousand Violins (January 4, 1950)
- Sure, A Little Bit of Murder (January 11, 1950)
- A Streetcar Named Schultz (January 18, 1950)
- The Killer of Cats (January 25, 1950)
- All the Queen’s Men (February 1, 1950)
- Title Unknown (February 8, 1950)
- Mama Inez (February 15, 1950)
- The Gorilla That Always Said Yeh-ah (February 22, 1950)
- Title Unknown (March 1, 1950)
- Title Unknown (March 8, 1950)
- Wine, Women and Worms (March 15, 1950)
- The Hollywood Story (March 22, 1950)
- A Tree Grows In Encino (March 29, 1950)
- Title Unknown (April 5, 1950)
- The Man behind the Rod (April 12, 1950)
- The Smell of Magnolias (April 19, 1950)
- It All Comes Back to Me Now (April 26, 1950)
- A Cure For Insomnia (May 3, 1950)
- Oil for the Lamps of Burbank (May 12, 1950)
- Lo, the Gentle Earthworm (May 19, 1950)
- A Claw, A Corkscrew, A Coffin, A Crab (May 26, 1950)
- This May Hurt Just a Little (June 2, 1950)
- Title Unknown (June 11, 1950)
- They’ve Got More Than Coffee In Brazil (June 18, 1950)
- No Sad Clowns for Me (June 25, 1950)
- Title Unknown (July 2, 1950)
- She’s Lovely, She’s Engaged, She Eats Soybeans (July 9, 1950)
- All His Sisters and His Cousins and His Uncles and His Aunts (July 16, 1950)
- Ninety-Nine Men on A Deadman’s Chest (July 23, 1950)
- A Fire for Romano (July 30, 1950)
- There’s Nothing Like A Pork Chop When Supper Rolls Around (August 6, 1950)
- A Streetcar Named Schultz (August 13, 1950)
- Gentlemen Prefer Horses (August 27, 1950)
- The British Are Coming (September 3, 1950)
