= I Fly Anything =

American old-time radio adventure drama

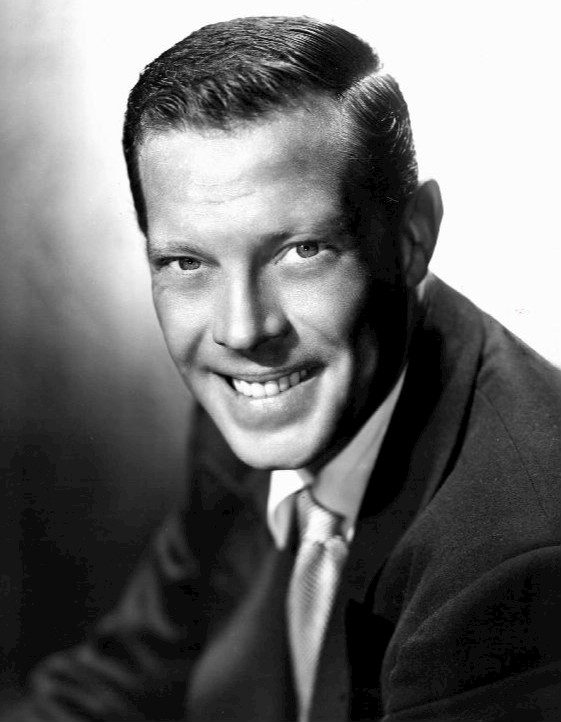
- Dick Haymes, star of I Fly Anything
- Genre: Adventure drama
- Running time: 30 minutes
- Country of origin: United States
- Language: English
- Syndicates: ABC
- Starring: Dick Haymes; George Fenneman; Georgia Ellis
- Announcer: Jay Arlen; Lou Cook
- Written by: Arnold Perl; Abe Ginniss; Les Crutchfield
- Directed by: Dwight Hauser; Clark Andrews
- Produced by: Frank Cooper; Sy Fisher
- Original release: November 29, 1950 – July 19, 1951

I Fly Anything is an American old-time radio adventure drama. It was broadcast on ABC from November 29, 1950, until July 19, 1951.

Dockery Crane was a freelance pilot who used his Douglas DC-4 plane for any job that was legal and would earn money. He was assisted by co-pilot Buzz and secretary June.

I Fly Anything was unusual in that it featured two men who were not known primarily as actors. Dick Haymes, who starred as Crane, was best known for his singing; the program was his debut as far as a straight dramatic role was concerned.

George Fenneman, who played Buzz, was usually heard as an announcer on radio and television. He was not in the show's original cast but was first heard in the January 23, 1951, episode, the same one in which Georgia Ellis joined the cast as Crane's secretary.

Jay Arlen and Lou Cook were the announcers, while Frank Cooper and Sy Fisher were producers. Dwight Hauser and Clark Andrews directed the program. Writers were Arnold Perl, Abe Ginniss, and Les Crutchfield.
