= Richard L. Breen =

American film director and screenwriter (1918–1967)

- Born: June 26, 1918; Chicago, Illinois, U.S.
- Died: February 1, 1967 (aged 48); Los Angeles, California, U.S.
- Occupations: Writer, screenwriter, director
- Years active: 1948–1967
- Children: 3

Richard L. Breen (June 26, 1918 – February 1, 1967) was a Hollywood screenwriter and director.

== Biography ==
Breen was born in Chicago of Irish Catholic extraction. He began as a freelance radio writer with Jack Webb: Pat Novak, for Hire, Johnny Madero, Pier 23. He was in the U.S. Navy during World War II. He began writing for films. He won an Oscar for his work on the screenplay to Titanic (1953), and was nominated for A Foreign Affair (1948) and Captain Newman, M.D. (1963). In 1957, he directed one film Stopover Tokyo, and then returned to screenwriting. He was president of the Screenwriters' Guild from 1952 to 1953. He had three daughters, including Tina Moylan (formerly Breen).

== Relations ==
Breen had three daughters, the only known one being Tina Moylan. Tina married Mike Moylan, and they had two children, Kelly Moylan and Kevin Moylan. Kelly Moylan had two daughters, Katlyn Horseley and Sarah Shattuck.

== Filmography ==
- A Foreign Affair (1948)
- Isn't It Romantic (1948)
- Miss Tatlock's Millions (1948)
- Top o' the Morning (1949)
- Appointment with Danger (1950)
- Fancy Pants (1950) – uncredited
- The Mating Season (1951)
- The Model and the Marriage Broker (1951)
- O. Henry's Full House (1952)
- Niagara (1953)
- Titanic (1953)
- Dragnet (1954)
- The Colgate Comedy Hour (1954) – contributor to one episode
- Pete Kelly's Blues (1955)
- Seven Cities of Gold (1955)
- 24 Hour Alert (1955) (short)
- The 28th Annual Academy Awards (1956)
- Stopover Tokyo (1957) – also director
- The FBI Story (1959)
- Wake Me When It's Over (1960)
- State Fair (1962)
- PT 109 (1963)
- Mary, Mary (1963)
- Captain Newman, M.D. (1963)
- Do Not Disturb (1965)
- A Man Could Get Killed (1966)
- Insight – various episodes
- Tony Rome (1967)
- Dragnet 1966 (1967)
- Dragnet 1967 (1967) – episode "The Christmas Story"
