= Dragnet (1954 film) =

1954 American film

- Theatrical release poster
- Directed by: Jack Webb
- Screenplay by: Richard L. Breen
- Produced by: Stanley D. Meyer
- Starring: Jack Webb; Ben Alexander; Richard Boone; Ann Robinson; Stacy Harris; Virginia Gregg; Vic Perrin
- Cinematography: Edward Colman
- Edited by: Robert M. Leeds
- Music by: Walter Schumann
- Production company: Mark VII Ltd.
- Distributed by: Warner Bros. Pictures
- Release date: September 4, 1954
- Running time: 88 minutes
- Country: United States
- Language: English
- Budget: $450,000-800,000

Dragnet is a 1954 American crime film directed by Jack Webb and written by Richard L. Breen. The film stars Webb, Ben Alexander, Richard Boone, Ann Robinson, Stacy Harris, Virginia Gregg and Vic Perrin. The film was adapted from the radio series of the same name, and is part of the wider Dragnet media franchise. The film was released by Warner Bros. Pictures on September 4, 1954.

== Plot ==
The film uses the inverted detective story format. Los Angeles police detective Sergeant Joe Friday hunts down the killer of a mobster, Miller Starkie, focusing on West Coast mafia second-in-command Max Troy (played by Harris). The vendetta between Friday and Troy becomes increasingly bitter and personal as the film proceeds, leading to a brawl at a private card game between Friday, Frank Smith, and several of Troy's henchmen. A policewoman (Robinson) infiltrates Troy's nightclub and is able to obtain vital information on the Starkie killing; Friday then gets additional evidence when an accomplice of Troy is sent out of state and killed, and the man's wife breaks down and gives the police what they need to convict Troy. The gangster, though, winds up never being prosecuted and dies of natural causes.

== Cast ==
- Jack Webb as Sergeant Joe Friday
- Ben Alexander as Officer Frank Smith
- Richard Boone as Capt. James E. Hamilton
- Ann Robinson as Officer Grace Downey
- Stacy Harris as Max Troy
- Virginia Gregg as Ethel Starkie
- Vic Perrin as Deputy D.A. Adolph Alexander
- Georgia Ellis as Belle Davitt
- James Griffith as Jesse Quinn
- Dick Cathcart as Roy Cleaver
- Malcolm Atterbury as Lee Reinhard
- Willard Sage as Chester Davitt
- Olan Soule as Ray Pinker
- Dennis Weaver as Capt. R.H. Lohrman (uncredited) Info via IMDb

== Production ==
In January 1954 not long after the Dragnet completed its hundredth episode, it was announced Jack L. Warner would produce a feature film in color based on the series with series producers Mark VII Limited. Dragnet creator and lead actor Jack Webb directed the film and was given complete creative control by Warner Bros. Much like the TV series, the film used an actual case as the basis for the plot with the case used considered too violent for broadcast television.
