= Pat Novak, for Hire =

Old-time radio detective drama series

- Genre: Detective drama
- Running time: 30 minutes
- Country of origin: United States
- Language: English
- Home station: KGO
- Syndicates: ABC Pacific, later full ABC
- Starring: Jack Webb; Ben Morris
- Announcer: George Fenneman; William Conrad; Raymond Burr
- Written by: Richard Breen; Gil Doud
- Directed by: Bill Rousseau
- Original release: 1946 – June 18, 1949

Pat Novak, for Hire is an old-time radio detective drama series which aired from 1946 to 1947 as a West Coast regional program (produced at KGO in San Francisco) and in 1949 as a nationwide program for ABC.

== Background ==
The regional version originally starred Jack Webb in the title role, with scripts by his roommate Richard L. Breen. When Webb and Breen moved from San Francisco to Los Angeles to work on an extremely similar nationwide series, Johnny Madero, Pier 23, for the Mutual network, Webb was replaced by Ben Morris and Breen by other writers. In the later 1949 network version, Jack Webb resumed the Novak role, and Breen his duties as scriptwriter. The series is popular among fans for its fast-paced, hard-boiled dialogue and action and witty one-liners.

== Synopsis ==
Ladies and gentlemen, the American Broadcasting Company brings to its entire network one of radio's most unusual programs … Pat Novak, for Hire.

Pat Novak, for Hire is set on the San Francisco waterfront and depicts the city as a dark, rough place where the main goal is survival. Novak is not a detective by trade, but he owns a boat shop on Pier 19 where he rents out boats and does odd jobs to make money.

Each episode of the program, particularly the Jack Webb episodes, follows the same basic formula; A foghorn sounds and Novak's footsteps are heard approaching. He then pauses and begins by wearily saying "Sure, I'm Pat Novak... for hire" (in one episode, "Rory Malone", he opens with "Sure, I'm Pat Foghorn..."). The foghorn repeats and leads to the intro theme, during which Novak gives a monologue about the waterfront and his job renting boats. Jack Webb narrates the story and plays the titular character. A downtrodden cynic, Novak throws off such lines as "Around here a set of morals won't cause any more stir than Mother's Day in an orphanage". He then relates a story about the trouble in which he found himself the past week.

The series existed, in fact, simply to push one-liners. Each story was exactly like all the others. They all opened to the same general patter... This was always the transition into the so-called story. Someone would hire Novak...Someone would get murdered, Novak would become the "patsy," and he'd get beaten up at least once by the thugs and again for good measure by his old enemy, Police Inspector Hellmann. His drunken pal, Jocko Madigan, would be enlisted to do some legwork, and all would end in glorious violence. The closing line...The listener was told who had done what, to whom, and occasionally why and how. None of it made much sense, but people tuned in for the writing and delivery.

Typically, a person unknown to Pat asks him to do an unusual or risky job. Pat reluctantly accepts and finds himself in hot water in the form of an unexplained dead body. Sultry females are usually involved. Police Inspector Hellman (played by Raymond Burr, who sometimes served as the program announcer making the opening and closing remarks) arrives on the scene and pins the murder on Novak. With only circumstantial evidence to go on, Hellman promises to haul Novak in the next day for the crime. The rapid, staccato dialogue between Webb and Burr is typical of hardboiled fiction and is often humorous. Pat uses the time to try to solve the case. He usually employs the help of "the only honest guy I know", his friend Jocko Madigan (played by Tudor Owen) – a drunken ex-doctor typically found at some disreputable tavern or bar – to help him solve the case. Each time Novak approaches him, Jocko launches into a long-winded philosophical diatribe, full of witty and funny remarks, until Novak cuts him off and asks for his help, which Jocko reluctantly agrees to, always ending their initial conversation with "Good night, Lover".

Jocko and Novak unravel the case and Hellman makes the arrest. Finally, we hear the foghorn and Novak's footsteps on the pier again before Novak spells out the outcome of the case for the listener. At the end, Novak informs us that "Hellman had only one question", which Pat answers with a clever retort.

The dialogue is rife with similes found in pulp fiction. Example: 'The neighborhood was run down – the kind of place where the For Rent signs look like ransom notes.'

== Other personnel ==
In the regional series of 1946–47, John Galbraith played the inspector, and Phyllis Skelton was frequently heard in female roles on the program. George Fenneman was the announcer.

During the 1949 network run, supporting actors included William Conrad, Virginia Gregg, Stacy Harris, Parley Baer, and Paul Frees. Conrad also functioned occasionally as the announcer. Basil Adlam led the orchestra.

== Episode guide ==
- Starring Jack Webb, regional network, 1946
1. Jack of Clubs (September 12, 1946)
  Pat goes to the bank to deposit $100, only to find that someone else has deposited $1000 in his account. When Pat returns home, a woman is waiting for him. She tells Pat that the $1000 was given to him by someone wanting him to steal a jack of clubs from a passenger on a ship docking that night. She wants Pat to steal the card for her instead.
2. An Envelope for John St. John (October 13, 1946)
  On his way out of the office, Pat sees an old man cross the street and get hit by a car. The old man gives Pat an envelope full of money and an envelope to deliver to a man named John St. John... and dies.
3. Go Away, Dixie Gillian (November 24, 1946)
  Pat is hired by a woman to frighten a man named Dixie Gillian by telling him a man named Adrian wants him to leave town by morning. (regional broadcast)*

Starring Ben Morris, regional network, 1947

1. Johnny Brown Gambling Ring (August 3, 1947)
  After Pat loses a lot of money from a previous job gambling in Tahoe, he's hired as a bodyguard on the drive back to San Francisco by an opportunistic bookie. While stopped at a gas station, Pat meets a saucy hitchhiker who later turns up dead in the trunk of the car.
2. Mysterious Set of Books (August 10, 1947)
  Pat gets a call from a lonely woman looking for company. When Pat arrives, Hellman answers the door. He's wrapping up a murder investigation in which a bookkeeper is murdered by his landlady. Someone approaches Pat about retrieving papers the bookkeeper was holding for him – for a cool grand. When he arrives, a woman who may be more than she lets on is already there.
3. The Lydia Reynolds Case (November 23, 1947)
  Pat picks up a fast woman in a fast car at the horse races. She hires him on as a bodyguard, but when she leaves the car to make a phone call, Pat is carjacked by a thug who seems to know who she is and who he is.
4. Death in Herald Square (November 30, 1947)
  Pat gets a call from a man whose door lock is broken and wants Pat to watch his apartment. Hellman shows up looking for a missing book related to a murder case with a $10,000 reward and reveals that the man who hired Pat does not own the apartment.
- Starring Jack Webb, national network, 1949
1. Jack of Clubs (February 20, 1949)
  Pat goes to the bank to deposit $100, only to find that someone else has deposited $1000 in his account. When Pat returns home, a woman is waiting for him. She tells Pat that the $1000 was given to him by someone wanting him to steal a jack of clubs from a passenger on a ship docking that night. She wants Pat to steal the card for her instead. This is a different production than September 12, 1946.
2. Marcia Halpern (February 27, 1949)
  Pat literally runs into a woman with amnesia as he's leaving a coffee shop. As she's trying to tell Pat her story, she dies. Pat must work to uncover her past before her death threatens his future.
3. Fleet Lady (March 6, 1949)
  A famous jockey hires Pat to find his missing racehorse, Fleet Lady. At the stables, Pat meets both the seductive owner of the horse as well as a dead body.
4. Rubin Callaway (March 13, 1949)
  Pat is hired by a mysterious woman to retrieve the contents of a safe deposit box, which puts Pat in danger and leads to murder.
5. Rory Malone (March 20, 1949)
  A beautiful and mysterious redhead gives Pat $300 to stay away from prizefighter Rory Malone, who he has never met. Later, the boxer's manager also offers Pat $300 to watch Malone that evening, which is when the trouble begins.
6. Joe Candono Blackmail Pictures (March 27, 1949)
  Pat is hired by a woman who wants him to meet with notorious gambler Joe Candono to pay off her brother's sizable gambling debt. Pat goes to meet with the woman and her brother to get information on Joe Candono's whereabouts, but runs into a group of thugs instead. Pat is knocked out and wakes up next to a dead body.
7. Father Lahey (April 2, 1949)
  A concerned priest hires Pat to pick up a prison escapee once under his care. A small detour before bringing the prisoner back to the priest leads to big trouble for Pat.
8. Sam Tolliver (April 9, 1949)
  Pat's old friend Sam Tolliver wants a quick favor. When the deal goes bad, Pat must track down Sam to clear his own name of a murder charge.
9. Go Away, Dixie Gillian (April 16, 1949)
  Pat is hired by a woman to frighten a man named Dixie Gillian, by telling him a man named Adrian wants him to leave town by morning. This is an updated version of the earlier episode of the same name.
10. Rita Malloy (April 23, 1949)
  Pat closes up shop early and finds a gunman in his apartment. The man knocks Pat out and takes his boat. It shows up later, all smashed up with a dead man and a hotel key inside.
11. Watch Wendy Morris (April 30, 1949)
  Pat is hired to keep tabs on a woman named Wendy Morris. The client suspects that her husband, who has returned from military duty overseas, is an impostor. This is one of the few episodes where Inspector Hellman is only mentioned but not heard; Pat explains that Hellman is on his honeymoon.
12. Shirt Mix-Up at the Laundry (May 7, 1949)
  Pat's laundry is mixed up with another customer's. When Pat tracks down the other customer to swap packages, he finds himself mixed up in trouble and murder.
13. Geranium Plant (May 14, 1949)
  A woman in a bar hires Pat to pick up a geranium plant at a corner flower shop and deliver it to an address. After Pat makes the pickup, he notices he's being followed by a small man with a cane. Suddenly, a car speeds toward Pat and hits him. Pat tries to fit the pieces together, only to learn that the flower shop no longer exists.
14. An Envelope for John St. John (May 21, 1949)
  On his way out of the office, Pat sees an old man cross the street and get hit by a car. The old man gives Pat an envelope full of money and an envelope to deliver to a man named John St. John... and dies. This is a different production than October 13, 1946.
15. Agnes Bolton (June 4, 1949)
  Pat is hired to follow a large woman named Agnes Bolton from a bowling alley and steal her green bag. But with many people after the bag, trouble is always around the corner for Pat.
16. Georgie Lampson (June 11, 1949)
  Pat's old flame Georgie Lampson hires Pat to take her out in his boat to meet a freighter with an important package.
17. The Only Way to Make Friends Is to Die (June 18, 1949)
  Two gunmen are looking for Joe Dineen and they think Pat knows where he is.
18. Little Jake Siegel (June 25, 1949)
  A priest asks to meet with Pat. When Pat is at the church, a shot is fired and – believe it or not – trouble ensues.

== 2023 revival ==
Once the original episodes had lapsed into the public domain, a tongue-in-cheek five-episode revival entitled Pat Novak 4 Hire 2024 was released in 2023. Sigue Hoffman voiced a female version of Pat.

== Other media ==
- A Pat Novak for Hire graphic novel was published in 2005 by Moonstone Books. The plot involves a now-retired Novak coming out of retirement to re-open one of his old cases.
- Ohmart, Ben. It's That Time Again. (2002) (Albany: BearManor Media) ISBN 0-9714570-2-6
