= Jack Webb =

American filmmaker and actor (1920–1982)

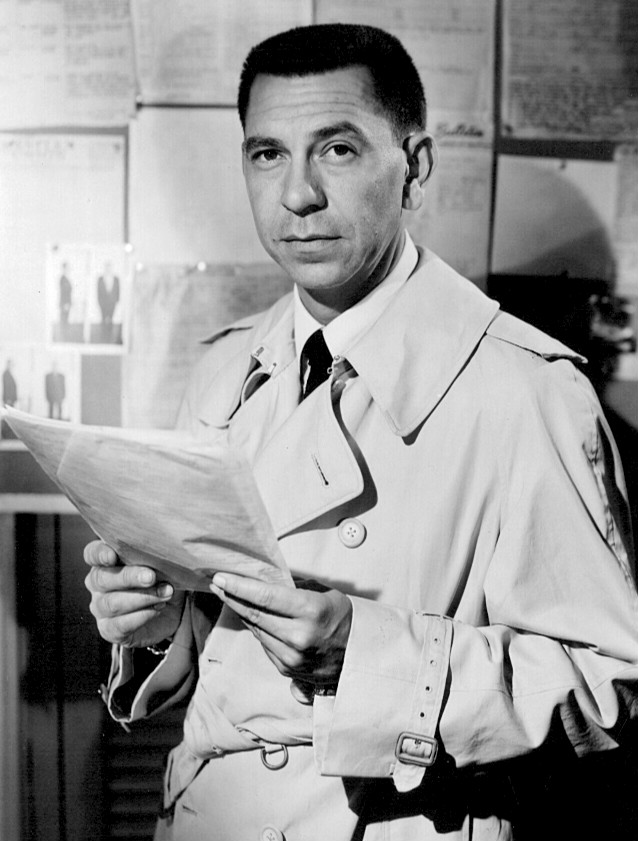
- Webb as Joe Friday in Dragnet (1957)
- Born: John Randolph Webb; April 2, 1920; Santa Monica, California, U.S.
- Died: December 23, 1982 (aged 62); West Hollywood, California, U.S.
- Resting place: Forest Lawn Memorial Park (Hollywood Hills); 34.14840°N 118.32718°W
- Other name: John Randolph
- Occupations: Actor; television producer; television director; screenwriter
- Years active: 1932–1982
- Spouses: Julie London (m. 1947; div. 1954) Dorothy Towne (m. 1955; div. 1957) Jackie Loughery (m. 1958; div. 1964) Opal Wright (m. 1980)
- Children: 2

John Randolph Webb (April 2, 1920 – December 23, 1982) was an American actor, television producer, director, and screenwriter, most famous for his role as Joe Friday in the Dragnet franchise, which he created. He was also the founder of his own production company, Mark VII Limited.

Webb started his career in the 1940s as a radio personality, starring in several radio shows and dramas—including Dragnet, which he created in 1949—before entering television in the 1950s, creating the television adaptation of Dragnet for NBC as well as other series. Throughout the 1960s, Webb worked in both acting and television production, creating Adam-12 in 1968, and in 1970, Webb retired from acting to focus on producing, creating Emergency! in 1972. Webb continued to make television series, and although many of them were less successful and short-lived, he wished to rekindle his prior successes, and had plans to return to acting in a Dragnet revival before he died.

Webb's production style aimed for significant levels of detail and accuracy. Many of his works focused on law enforcement and emergency services in the Los Angeles area, most prominently the Los Angeles Police Department (LAPD), which directly supported the production of Dragnet and Adam-12.

== Early life ==
Webb was born in Santa Monica, California, on April 2, 1920, son of Samuel Chester Webb and Margaret (née Smith) Webb. He grew up in poverty in the Bunker Hill section of Los Angeles. His father left home before Webb was born, and Webb never knew him.

In the late 1920s and early 1930s, Webb lived in the parish of Our Lady of Loretto Catholic Church and attended Our Lady of Loretto Elementary School in Echo Park, where he served as an altar boy. He then attended Belmont High School, near downtown Los Angeles, where he was elected student body president. He wrote to Belmont's student body in the 1938 edition of its yearbook, Campanile, "You who showed me the magnificent warmth of friendship which I know, and you know, I will carry with me forever." Webb attended St. John's University, Minnesota, where he studied art.

During World War II, Webb enlisted in the United States Army Air Corps, studying at College of Saint Benedict and Saint John's University but he "washed out" of flight training, in pilot class 44-D at the Rankin Aeronautical Academy, Tulare, California and became a B-26 Marauder crew member in the Army Air Forces. He later received a hardship discharge because he was the primary financial support for both his mother and grandmother.

== Radio ==
Following his discharge, Webb moved to San Francisco, where a wartime shortage of announcers led to a temporary appointment to his own radio show on ABC's KGO Radio. The Jack Webb Show was a half-hour comedy that had a limited run on ABC radio in 1946. Prior to that, he had a one-man program, One Out of Seven, on KGO in which he dramatized a news story from the previous week. Webb provided all of the voices on One Out of Seven, often vigorously attacking racial prejudice.

By 1946, Webb had abandoned comedy for drama, and starred in Pat Novak, for Hire, a radio show, with scripts by his roommate Richard L. Breen, originating from KFRC about a man who worked as an unlicensed private detective. The program co-starred Raymond Burr. Pat Novak was notable for writing that imitated the hardboiled style of such writers as Raymond Chandler, with lines such as: "She drifted into the room like 98 pounds of warm smoke. Her voice was hot and sticky — like a furnace full of marshmallows."

Webb's radio shows included One Out of Seven (ABC, 1946) from San Francisco; Pat Novak, for Hire (ABC, 1946) from San Francisco with scripts by Richard L. Breen; Johnny Madero, Pier 23 (1947) on Mutual from Los Angeles with scripts by Richard L. Breen; Jeff Regan, Investigator (CBS, 1948–1949); Pat Novak, for Hire (ABC, 1949) with scripts by Richard L. Breen; Pete Kelly's Blues, (NBC, 1951); and Dragnet (NBC, 1949–1956).

Airing on 2 January 1949, in "The Better Man" episode of the radio series Box 13, Webb served as the main antagonist of Alan Ladd's protagonist character Dan Holliday.

== Film ==
In 1950, Webb appeared in three films that would become cult classics. In Sunset Boulevard, he is the fiancé of William Holden's love interest Nancy Olson (his performance is very animated and jovial, unlike his later deadpan style). He played a war veteran in Marlon Brando's first feature, The Men, and in the film noir Dark City, he co-starred with Harry Morgan, his future partner on the second Dragnet series.

Webb's most famous motion-picture role was as the combat-hardened Marine Corps drill instructor at Parris Island in the 1957 film The D.I., with Don Dubbins as a callow Marine private. Webb's hard-nosed approach to this role, that of Drill Instructor Technical Sergeant James Moore, would be reflected in much of his later acting, but The D.I. was a box office failure.

Webb was approached to play the role of Vernon Wormer, dean of Faber College, in National Lampoon's Animal House, but he refused, saying "the movie didn't make any damn sense". John Vernon ultimately played the role.

== Dragnet and stardom ==
Webb had a featured role as a crime-lab technician in the 1948 film He Walked by Night, based on the real-life murder of California Highway Patrolman Loren Cornwell Roosevelt by Erwin Walker. The film was produced in semidocumentary style with technical assistance provided by Detective Sergeant Marty Wynn of the Los Angeles Police Department. The film's fictionalized recounting of the 1946 Walker crime spree gave Webb the idea for Dragnet, a series based on real cases from LAPD police files, featuring authentic depictions of the modern police methods, mannerisms, and technical language.

With much assistance from Wynn and LAPD chief William H. Parker, Dragnet premiered on NBC Radio in 1949 and ran until 1957. It was also picked up as a television series by NBC, which aired episodes each season from 1952 to 1959. Webb played Sgt. Joe Friday and Barton Yarborough co-starred as Sgt. Ben Romero. After Yarborough's death, Ben Alexander joined the cast.

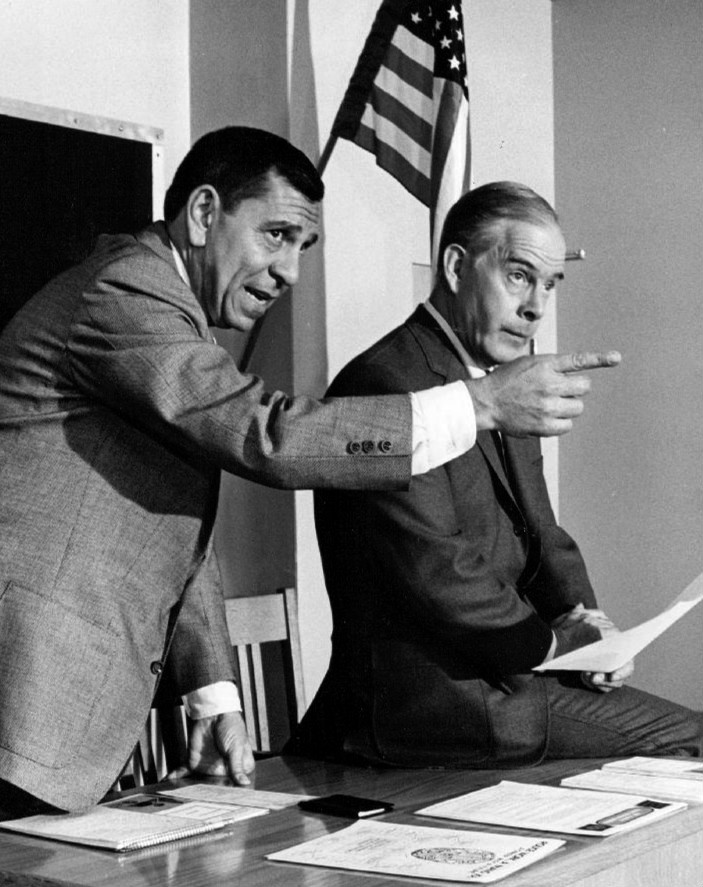
Webb with Harry Morgan in Dragnet 1968

Webb was a stickler for detail. He believed viewers wanted "realism" and tried to give it to them. Webb had tremendous respect for law enforcement personnel. He often said in interviews that he was angry about the "ridiculous amount" of abuse to which police were subjected by the press and the public. Webb was also impressed by the long hours, the low pay, and the high injury rate among police investigators of the day, particularly in the LAPD, which had by then acquired a notorious reputation for jettisoning officers who had become ill or injured in the line of duty. In Webb's book, The Badge, one of Erwin Walker's victims, LAPD detective Lt. Colin Forbes was the recipient of such treatment.

In announcing his vision of Dragnet, Webb said he intended to perform a service for the police by showing them as low-key working-class heroes. Dragnet moved away from earlier portrayals of the police in shows such as Jeff Regan and Pat Novak, which had often shown them as brutal and corrupt. Dragnet became a successful television show in 1952. Barton Yarborough died of a heart attack in 1951, after filming only two episodes, and Barney Phillips (Sgt. Ed Jacobs) and Herbert Ellis (Officer Frank Smith) temporarily stepped in as partners. Veteran radio and film actor Ben Alexander took over the role of jovial, burly Officer Frank Smith. Alexander was popular and remained a cast member until the show's cancellation in 1959. In 1954, a full-length feature-film adaptation of the series was released, starring Webb, Alexander, and Richard Boone.

The television version of Dragnet began with this narration by George Fenneman: "Ladies and gentlemen, the story you are about to see is true. The names have been changed to protect the innocent." Webb would intone, "This is the city: Los Angeles, California." He would then make a historical or topical point, describe his duties, his partner, and superior on the episode. The radio series had a similar opening, though Webb, as Friday, did not give a unique Los Angeles-themed opening. Webb then set the plot by describing a typical day and then led into the story. "It was Wednesday, March 19th. It was cool in Los Angeles. I was at headquarters, working narcotics ..." At the end of each show, Fenneman repeated his opening narration, revised to read: "The story you have just seen is true. The names were changed to protect the innocent."

A second announcer, Hal Gibney, usually gave dates when and specific courtrooms where trials were held for the suspects, announcing the trial verdicts after commercial breaks. Many suspects shown to have been found guilty at the end were also shown as having been confined at San Quentin State Prison. Webb frequently recreated entire floors of buildings on sound stages, such as the police headquarters at Los Angeles City Hall and a floor of the Los Angeles Herald Examiner.

During Dragnet's early days, Webb continued to appear in movies, notably as Artie Green, the best friend of William Holden's character in the 1950 Billy Wilder film Sunset Boulevard. The character Green was an assistant director and fiancé to script reader Betty Schaefer (played by Nancy Olson).

In Dark City, Webb played a vicious card sharp and Harry Morgan a punch-drunk ex-fighter, in contrast to the pair's straight-arrow image in the later Dragnet. Also in 1950, Webb appeared in The Men, Marlon Brando's debut film. Both actors played paraplegics undergoing rehabilitation at a veterans' hospital. In a subplot, Webb's character, a cynical intellectual, is fleeced of his life savings by a woman who feigns romantic interest.

In 1951, Webb introduced a short-lived radio series, Pete Kelly's Blues, in an attempt to bring the music he loved to a broader audience. That show became the basis for a 1955 film of the same name. In 1959, a television version was made. Neither was very successful. The character of Pete Kelly was a cornet player who supplemented his income from playing in a nightclub band by working as a private investigator.

== 1962–1963 ==
From September 1962 through May 1963, Webb was the executive producer of GE True, an anthology series that ran for 33 episodes, each of which Webb acted as host-narrator for while also directing and acting in some episodes. At the beginning of June 1963, it was reported that GE True would not continue.

In February 1963, Webb succeeded William T. Orr as executive in charge of Warner Bros. Television, with Orr moving to the motion picture part of Warner Bros. Webb brought about wholesale changes to the ABC/Warner Bros. detective series 77 Sunset Strip retaining only Efrem Zimbalist Jr., in the role of private detective Stuart Bailey. The result was a disaster, and critics accused Webb of being out of touch with the younger generation of viewers.

That same year, Webb sold Temple Houston to NBC. The show, starring Jeffrey Hunter, followed the exploits of Temple Lea Houston, a circuit-riding lawyer and the youngest son of Sam Houston. Despite Webb and Hunter's high profiles, however, it ended after its 26-week run. In a 1965 interview with The Milwaukee Journal, Hunter described the situation:

In the first place, we had no time to prepare for [the series]. I was notified on July 17 to be ready to start August 7 for an October air date. When we reached the screen we did not have a single segment ready. It was done so fast the writers never got a chance to know what it was all about. We all wanted to follow the line indicated by the pilot film, which we thought would make a charming series. NBC, however, favored making it serious.

Webb's role with Warner ended in December 1963.

== 1967: Dragnet on TV ==
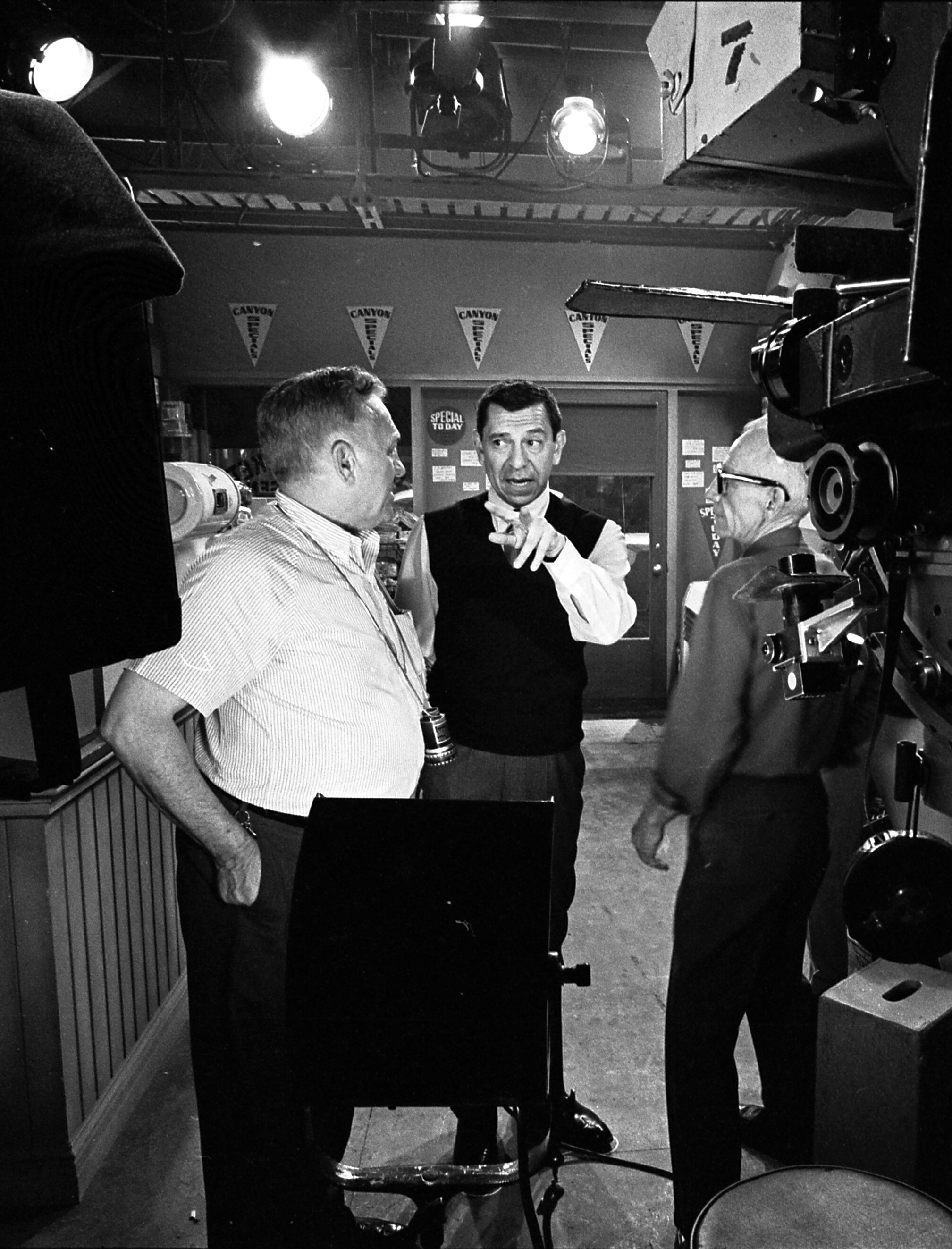
Jack Webb and Walter Strenge on the set of Dragnet, 1966

Shortly after leaving his position at Warner Bros., he first attempted to produce an adaptation of the Selena Mead books by Patricia McGerr for CBS, then Webb teamed with Universal Television to begin work on a new Dragnet series. A pilot television film, based on the Harvey Glatman serial killings, was produced in 1966 for NBC, with Webb's Sgt. Joe Friday joined by Harry Morgan as Officer Bill Gannon. Webb had tried to get Ben Alexander to reprise his role as Frank Smith, but Alexander would not leave the ABC series Felony Squad.

The new Dragnet premiered as a midseason replacement series on January 12, 1967, and aired until April 16, 1970. To distinguish it from the original series, the year of production was added to the title (Dragnet 1967, Dragnet 1968, etc.). The revival emphasized crime prevention and outreach to the public. Its attempts to address the contemporary youth-drug culture (such as the revival's first episode, "The LSD Story", guest-starring Michael Burns as Benjamin John "Blue Boy" Carver, voted 85th-best TV episode of all time by TV Guide and TV Land) have led certain episodes on the topic to achieve cult status due to their strained attempts to be "with-it", such as Joe Friday grilling "Blue Boy" by asking him, "You're pretty high and far out, aren't you? What kind of kick are you on, son?" Don Dubbins, who had acted alongside Webb in The D.I. in 1957, was featured in the second Dragnet 1967 episode, "The Big Explosion," and was another featured actor in Mark VII Limited programs beginning in the 1960s. Other Webb-affiliated actors featured in the revived series many times in different roles were Virginia Gregg, Stacy Harris, Peggy Webber, Clark Howat, Olan Soule, Bobby Troup, Tim Donnelly, and Marco Lopez.

In 1968, Webb and his production partner R.A. Cinader launched Adam-12 on NBC. A spinoff of Dragnet, Adam-12 starred Martin Milner and Kent McCord as a pair of LAPD officers, and followed their escapades while on patrol. Running until 1975 for a total of seven seasons, Adam-12 was Webb's second-longest running television series, with the eight seasons recorded by the original Dragnet being the longest.

Also in 1968, Webb and Johnny Carson performed a sketch on The Tonight Show that has since become known as the "Copper Clapper Caper" sketch. Webb, in character as Joe Friday, was working on the case of a robbery at a school-bell factory. Carson played the owner of the factory and victim of the theft, which consisted of each bell being relieved of its clapper (the device that makes the bell ring). The sketch's dialogue consisted of Webb and Carson discussing the situation in deadpan style and using alliteration and tongue twisters to describe the incident, each word having either a "c" or "cl" sound at the beginning. Both Webb and Carson tried desperately not to lose composure, but both did, near the end of the sketch.

== Mark VII Limited production ==
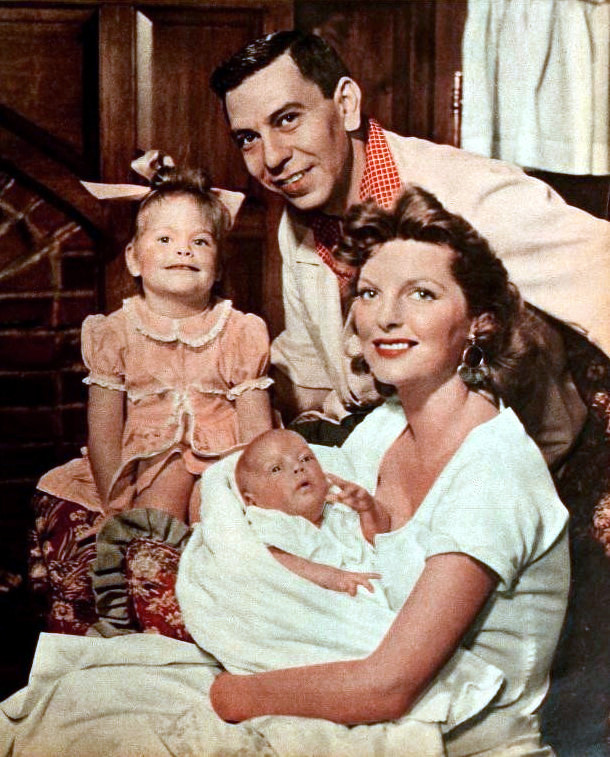
Jack Webb with first wife Julie London and daughters Stacy and Lisa, 1953

In 1970, Webb decided to bring an end to Dragnet and cease acting to focus on expanding Mark VII Limited's production profile. In 1971, Webb entered the world of district attorneys and federal government work with two series. The first, The D.A., starred Robert Conrad and Harry Morgan as a pair of Los Angeles County ADAs, with Conrad playing a junior ADA and Morgan his superior. The second, O'Hara, United States Treasury, was a co-production of Webb and David Janssen, the former star of The Fugitive and future star of Harry O, for CBS (a rare non-NBC Mark VII effort) and featured Janssen as a Nebraska county sheriff-turned-United States Treasury Department agent. Neither series lasted very long, as The D.A., Webb's last 30-minute series, was cancelled after 15 episodes and O'Hara ended after 22.

== Emergency! ==
Later in the 1971–72 season, Webb and Cinader launched Emergency!, which focused on the fictional Station 51 Rescue Squad of the L.A. County Fire Department, and its work in coordination with the emergency department staff of the fictional Rampart General Hospital. LACoFD's paramedic program was among the first paramedic services in the United States. Webb cast his ex-wife, Julie London, as well as her second husband and Dragnet ensemble player Bobby Troup, as Rampart's Chief Nurse of The Emergency Room, Dixie McCall and Dr. Joe Early, respectively, with Randolph Mantooth and Kevin Tighe playing paramedics, John Gage and Roy DeSoto and Robert Fuller playing Dr. Kelly Brackett, Rampart's Chief of Emergency Medicine.

Emergency! ran as part of NBC's Saturday-night lineup for six entire seasons, and it was a hugely popular series, sometimes winning its time slot against CBS's popular Saturday-night comedy block, which included All in the Family. The series came to an end in 1977, but it spawned a series of telefilms that ran until 1979. Webb's company and Universal also contracted with animator Fred Calvert to produce a spin-off Saturday-morning cartoon show for NBC titled Emergency +4, which ran for three seasons (the last in reruns) and featured the paramedics Gage and DeSoto assisted by four youngsters and their three pets. The franchise was also credited in performing a social good in easing acceptance of the emergency medical service and encouraging communities to establish the service locally.

Emergency! was Webb's last sustained success. Of the remaining series his company produced, the only two that lasted longer than one season were Hec Ramsey, a two-season component of the NBC Mystery Movie wheel series that featured former Have Gun – Will Travel star Richard Boone as a pioneering forensic scientist in the Old West, and Project UFO, an anthology based on the investigations into UFOs as compiled by Project Bluebook that also ran for two seasons beginning in 1978. Webb left Universal in 1977 and moved production offices of the Independent Mark VII Limited to the Samuel Goldwyn Studio and signed a distribution deal with Worldvision Enterprises.

== Dragnet revival ==
Despite his string of short-lived series in the late 1970s, Webb continued attempts to recapture his previous success and decided to bring Dragnet back to television for a third time in 1982. Departing from the original format (with Harry Morgan tied up with his commitments to M*A*S*H, and its already greenlit followup AfterMASH), Webb decided he would not appear in the series as Sgt. Joe Friday (other than in voice over), and approached former Adam-12 stars Martin Milner and Kent McCord (who had several guest appearances early in the 1967 revival series) to reprise their roles as now-detectives Malloy and Reed in the updated Dragnet series. Days after speaking with McCord about the project, Webb died unexpectedly from a heart attack on December 23, 1982, and the Dragnet revival was scrapped.

In 1987, Dan Aykroyd and Tom Hanks starred in a movie parody (and homage) to Webb, titled Dragnet, along with Harry Morgan, who reprised his role from the 1967–70 television series as Bill Gannon, who had by now become a captain of detectives. The comedy film was written and directed by Tom Mankiewicz, in his directorial debut. Aykroyd played the role of Joe Friday, described as the namesake nephew of the original series lead, while Hanks co-starred as Detective Officer Pep Streebeck, Friday's new smart-alecky and streetwise partner.

== Personal life ==
Webb's personal life was better defined by his love of jazz than his interest in police work. He had a collection of more than 6,000 jazz recordings. Webb's own recordings reached cult status, including his deadpan delivery of "Try A Little Tenderness". His lifelong interest in the cornet allowed him to move easily in the jazz culture, where he met singer and actress Julie London. They had two daughters, Stacy and Lisa. They divorced in 1954. He was married three more times after that, to Dorothy Towne for two years beginning in 1955, to former Miss USA Jackie Loughery for six years beginning in 1958, and to his longtime associate, Opal Wright, for the last two years of his life.

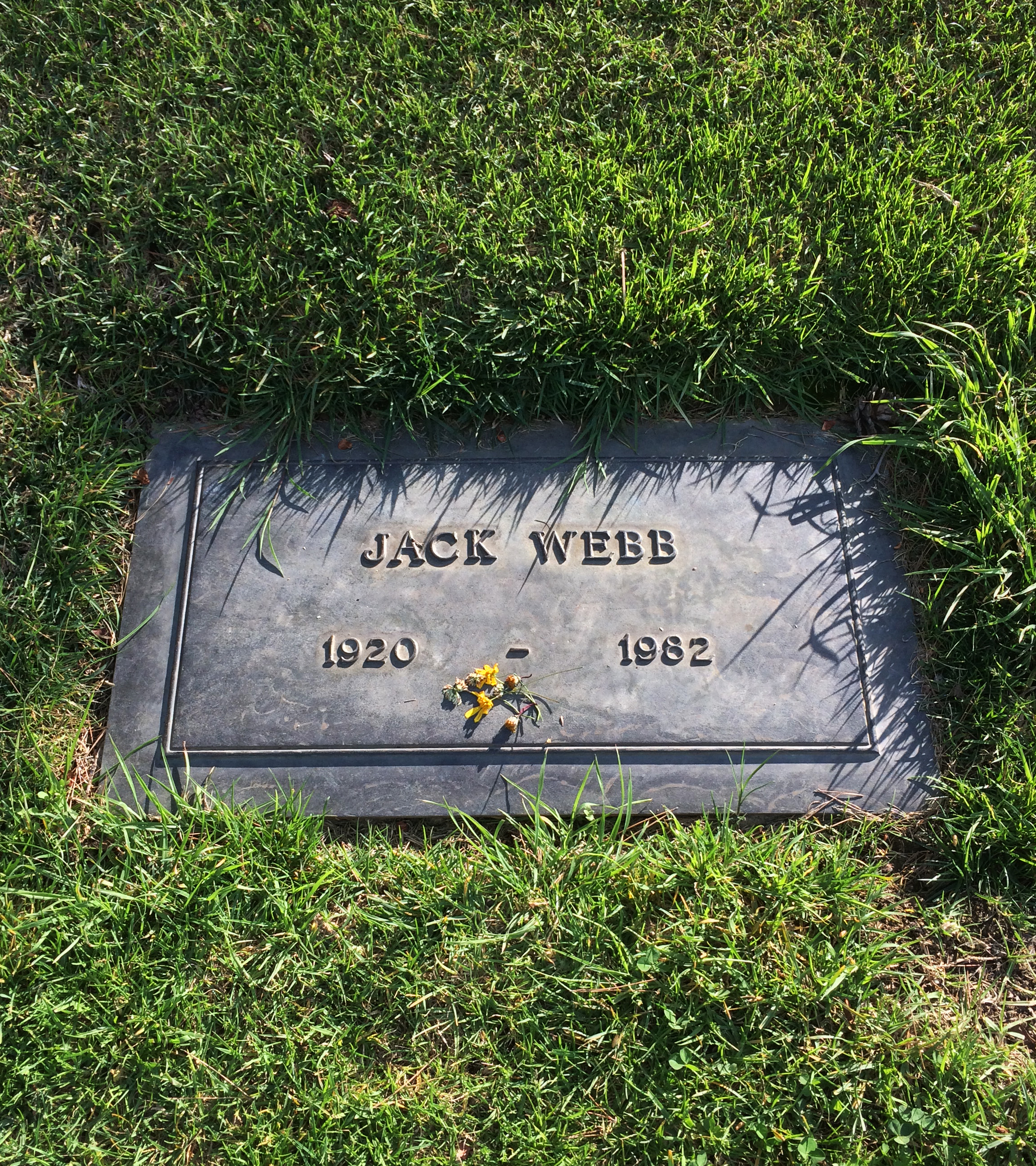
The grave of Jack Webb at Forest Lawn Memorial Park Cemetery, in the Hollywood Hills

Stacy Webb authorized and collaborated on a book, Just the Facts, Ma'am: The Authorized Biography of Jack Webb, Creator of Dragnet, Adam-12, and Emergency!, of which Daniel Moyer and Eugene Alvarez were the primary authors. It was published in 1999. Stacy did not live to see the publication of the book, having been killed in a collision with a California Highway Patrol vehicle three years earlier.

Mamie Van Doren claimed in a 2001 interview that Webb drugged and raped her after a date. She detailed the claim in her memoir, You Thought I Was Dead, which was released in 2026.

== Death ==
Webb died of an apparent heart attack in the early morning hours of December 23, 1982, at age 62. He is interred at Sheltering Hills Plot 1999, Forest Lawn, Hollywood Hills Cemetery in Los Angeles, and was given a funeral with full Los Angeles police honors. On Webb's death, Chief Daryl Gates announced that badge number 714, which was used by Joe Friday in Dragnet, would be retired. Los Angeles Mayor Tom Bradley ordered all flags lowered to half staff in Webb's honor for a day, and Webb was buried with a replica LAPD badge bearing the rank of sergeant and the number 714.

== Legacy ==
Webb has two stars on the Hollywood Walk of Fame, one for radio (at 7040 Hollywood Boulevard) and the other for television (at 6728 Hollywood Boulevard). In 1992, Webb was posthumously inducted into the Television Hall of Fame.

== Filmography ==
=== Film ===
Year	Title	Role	Notes
1932	Three on a Match	Boy in schoolyard	Uncredited
1948	Hollow Triumph	Bullseye	Uncredited
1948	He Walked by Night	Lee	
1949	Sword in the Desert	Hoffman	Uncredited
1950	Appointment with Danger	Joe Regas	
1950	The Men	Norm	Alternative title: Battle Stripe; Marlon Brando's film debut
1950	Sunset Boulevard	Artie Green	
1950	Dark City	Augie	
1951	Halls of Montezuma	Correspondent Dickerman	
1951	You're in the Navy Now	Ens. Anthony "Tony" Barbo	Alternative title: U.S.S. Teakettle
1954	Dragnet	Sgt. Joe Friday	Also director
1955	Pete Kelly's Blues	Pete Kelly	Also director and producer
1957	The D.I.	Technical Sgt. Jim Moore	Also director and producer
1957	Red Nightmare	Narrator	Also producer. Educational short film made for the United States Armed Forces.
1959	-30-	Sam Gatlin	Also director and producer
1961	The Last Time I Saw Archie	William "Bill" Bowers	Also director and producer
1967	Greyhounds of the Sea	Narrator	United States Navy (final role)

=== Television ===
Year	Title	Role	Notes
1951–1959	Dragnet	Sergeant Joe Friday	276 episodes
1956–1957	Noah's Ark	Creator of the series starring Paul Burke	24 episodes
1962–1963	GE True	Host-narrator†	33 episodes; Executive Producer, Director (4 episodes)
1967–1970	Dragnet 1967	Sergeant Joe Friday	98 episodes
1968–1975	Adam-12	—	174 episodes; Co-Creator, Executive Producer, Writer
1971	O'Hara, U.S. Treasury	Narrator	1 episode
1971	The Partners	The Commissioner	1 episode
1972–1976	Emergency!	—	Creator, Executive Producer, Director (5 episodes)
1972–1974	Hec Ramsey	—	Producer, 10 episodes
1978	Project UFO	Announcer	1 episode, (final appearance)

† Webb also starred in the GE True two-part episode "Code Name: Christopher"

== Discography ==
- Songs from Pete Kelly's Blues (1955)
- You're My Girl: Romantic Reflections by Jack Webb (1958)
- Pete Kelly Lets His Hair Down (1958)
- Golden Throats volume 1 (1988)
- Just the Tracks, Ma'am: The Warner Brothers Recordings (2000)
