= The Six Shooter =

American western old-time radio program

- Genre: Western drama
- Running time: 30 minutes
- Country of origin: United States
- Language: English
- Syndicates: NBC
- Starring: James Stewart
- Announcer: Hal Gibney; John Wald
- Created by: Frank Burt
- Written by: Frank Burt
- Directed by: Jack Johnstone
- Original release: September 20, 1953 – June 24, 1954
- No. of series: 1
- No. of episodes: 39
- Opening theme: Highland Lament

The Six Shooter is a United States Western old-time radio program starring James Stewart as a gunfighter. It was created by Frank Burt, who also wrote many of the episodes, and lasted only one season of 39 episodes on NBC (Sept. 20, 1953–June 24, 1954). Initially, it was broadcast on Sundays at 9:30 pm Eastern Time, through October 11. Then it was heard at 8:30 pm for three weeks. Finally, on November 8, 1953, through March 21, 1954, it was broadcast Sundays at 8 pm; beginning April 1, 1954, through the final episode, it was on Thursdays at 8:30 pm. One old-time radio directory called the program "a last, desperate effort by a radio network (NBC) to maintain interest in adventure drama by employing a major Hollywood movie star in the leading role."

Stewart starred as Britt Ponset, a drifting cowboy in the final years of the wild west. Episodes ranged from straight Western drama to whimsical comedy. A trademark of the show was Stewart's use of whispered narration during tense scenes that created a heightened sense of drama, and relief when the situation was resolved.

Some of the more prominent actors to perform on the program included Parley Baer, Virginia Gregg, Harry Bartell, Howard McNear, Jeanette Nolan, Dan O'Herlihy, Alan Reed, Marvin Miller, and William Conrad (often credited as "Julius Krelboyne" because he was also the star of CBS's radio show Gunsmoke, playing Marshall Matt Dillon at the time). Some did multiple episodes playing different characters.

Each episode opened with the announcer (Hal Gibney; John Wald in later episodes) stating: "The man in the saddle is angular and long-legged. His skin is sun-dyed brown. The gun in his holster is gray steel and rainbow mother-of-pearl, its handle unmarked. People call them both 'the Six Shooter'."

The haunting theme music was "Highland Lament", arranged by series composer Basil Adlam and written by British film composer Charles Williams. Jack Johnstone was the producer-director for NBC Radio, in association with Revue Productions.

The final episode, "Myra Barker", provided a satisfying (if melancholy) finale to the series. Ponset falls in love with Myra, and proposes marriage. Myra, after thinking it over, appears to accept, but then tells Britt she has heard that Sheriff Jennings of Eagle Falls has asked for his help, and Britt admits that he feels obligated to go. Myra tells Britt to go and not come back, telling him some adventure will always call him, and he will always go, or regret not going. Britt goes, resuming his wanderings, but not before revealing to the audience that he knows he was *not* needed in Eagle Falls, and knows Myra knows that, too. The moment comes across as a moment of supreme self-realization by Britt that he always will be a wanderer.

== Episodes ==
| Ep # | Title | Airdate |
|---|---|---|
| — | Hollywood Star Playhouse | April 13, 1952 |
| — | (Audition Program) | July 15, 1953 |
| 01 | "Jenny" | September 20, 1953 |
| 02 | "The Coward" | September 27, 1953 |
| 03 | "The Stampede" | October 4, 1953 |
| 04 | "Silver Annie" | October 11, 1953 |
| 05 | "Rink Larkin" | October 18, 1953 |
| 06 | "Red Lawson's Revenge" | October 25, 1953 |
| 07 | "Ben Scofield" | November 1, 1953 |
| 08 | "The Capture of Stacy Gault" | November 8, 1953 |
| 09 | "Escape from Smoke Falls" | November 15, 1953 |
| 10 | "Gabriel Starbuck" | November 22, 1953 |
| 11 | "Sheriff Billy" | November 29, 1953 |
| 12 | "A Pressing Engagement" | December 6, 1953 |
| 13 | "More Than Kin" | December 13, 1953 |
| 14 | "Britt Ponset's Christmas Carol" | December 20, 1953 |
| 15 | "Cora Plummer Quincy" | December 27, 1953 |
| 16 | "A Friend in Need" | January 3, 1954 |
| 17 | "Hiram's Goldstrike" | January 10, 1954 |
| 18 | "The Silver Buckle" | January 17, 1954 |
| 19 | "Helen Bricker" | January 24, 1954 |
| 20 | "Trail to Sunset" | January 31, 1954 |
| 21 | "Apron Faced Sorrel" | February 7, 1954 |
| 22 | "Quiet City" | February 14, 1954 |
| 23 | "Battle at Tower Rock" | February 21, 1954 |
| 24 | "Cheyenne Express" | March 7, 1954 |
| 25 | "Thicker Than Water" | March 14, 1954 |
| 26 | "Duel at Lockwood" | March 21, 1954 |
| 27 | "Aunt Em" | April 1, 1954 |
| 28 | "General Gillford's Widow" | April 8, 1954 |
| 29 | "Crises at Easter Creek" | April 15, 1954 |
| 30 | "Johnny Stringer" | April 22, 1954 |
| 31 | "Revenge at Harness Creek" | April 29, 1954 |
| 32 | "Anna Norquest" | May 6, 1954 |
| 33 | "The Double Seven" | May 13, 1954 |
| 34 | "The Shooting of Wyatt King" | May 20, 1954 |
| 35 | "Blood Relations" | May 27, 1954 |
| 36 | "Silver Threads" | June 3, 1954 |
| 37 | "The New Sheriff" | June 10, 1954 |
| 38 | "When The Shoe Doesn't Fit" | June 17, 1954 |
| 39 | "Myra Barker" | June 24, 1954 |

== Adaptation ==
James Stewart filmed a television pilot episode titled The Windmill featuring Barbara Hale, John McIntire, and Edgar Buchanan, but it somehow failed to sell. A perfect copy of the episode exists, however. The program was later successfully adapted for television in 1957 with John Payne as the star; by that time, Stewart's career had completely recovered from his initial postwar slump, and he was no longer available. An article in a trade publication reported that 39 "half-hour tv films" would be produced "for a series titled The Six Shooter." Frank Burt was the consultant for all episodes of the adaptation. The pilot episode, titled "The Restless Gun", aired on 29 March 1957 as an episode of the anthology series Schlitz Playhouse of Stars. John Payne, who went on to star in the series, played the lead character, Britt Ponsett. By the time the series, also called The Restless Gun, debuted the following fall, though, the main character's name had been changed to Vint Bonner, "a slightly altered rendition of Britt Ponset".

== Trivia ==
- An episode of the anthology Hollywood Star Playhouse on NBC entitled "The Six Shooter", was broadcast April 13, 1952. This used the "Ben Scofield" script, which was also used for the audition episode and (with a slightly different opening) the seventh episode of the series.
- The unaired audition episode, recorded July 15, 1953, includes a personal message by James Stewart in the middle and end trying to sell the program to potential sponsors.
- Stewart revived the Ponset character for the Feb. 10, 1957, episode of the television anthology program General Electric Theater titled "The Town with a Past". The script was based on the "Silver Annie" episode of the radio show. Stewart, however, declined to appear on a weekly TV version, and the proposed series was offered to John Payne.
- The Dec. 15, 1957, episode of G.E. Theater, "The Trail to Christmas", was based on the radio episode "Britt Ponset's Christmas Carol", although in this instance, Stewart's character was renamed Bart, and the Dec. 15, 1959, episode of the television anthology program Startime, "Cindy's Fella", was based on the radio episode "When the Shoe Doesn't Fit". Stewart took the role of peddler Azel Dorsey, while George Gobel played an unnamed drifter in place of Ponset.
- Ponset's horse was named Scar.
- Although Liggett & Myers Tobacco Co. was interested in underwriting the program, James Stewart refused to accept, believing that it did not coincide with his public image. Jack Johnstone was quoted as saying, "Chesterfield begged and begged and begged for months trying to get sponsorship, but Jim didn’t feel that, because of his screen image, it would be fair for him to be sponsored by a cigarette". Coleman eventually bought commercial time during the first four episodes, but no other advertisers sustained the series after that.
