= Hal Gibney =

American radio announcer (1911–1973)

- Born: Harold T. Gibney; August 26, 1911; Woodland, California, U.S.
- Died: June 5, 1973 (aged 61); Santa Barbara, California, U.S.
- Education: San Mateo Junior College
- Occupation: Announcer
- Years active: 1935–1970
- Spouses: Gay Williams (m. 1935; div. 1941) Juanita Fields (m. 1946) Marion L. McKinstry (m. 1955; div. 1970) Julie Pratt-Tripp (m. 1971)

Harold T. "Hal" Gibney (August 26, 1911 – June 5, 1973) was NBC's West Coast announcer for more than 20 years.

He was best known as the announcer for The Six Shooter and The Mickey Mouse Club. He was also known as the announcer for the radio and the original television version of Dragnet.

== Early life ==
Gibney was born Harold T. Gibney on August 26, 1911. He was born in Woodland, California, to parents William H. Gibney, (died August 15, 1933) and Hattie V. Gibney, (1888–1970). In 1920, the family moved to Alameda, California. Gibney graduated from San Mateo Junior College in 1930.

== Career ==
=== Radio ===
==== Early radio career ====
Gibney first started out in radio at KTAB, (now KZAC) in San Francisco, California. He was an announcer there. In March 1935, Gibney relocated to Portland, Oregon, where he joined the announcing staff of both Portland-based radio stations KGW, (now KPOJ) and KEX. Gibney's first noted announcing job was the KEX broadcast of the homecoming of the Oregon National Guard from Fort Lewis on June 25, 1935. He was joined by Van Fleming and Larry Keating.

Gibney began announcing on a weekly basis for the first time with the first broadcast of the radio series Safeway Circus Court on November 2, 1935. The series came on KGW. He would stay with the program until he left KGW in January 1936. Safeway finished its run on February 8, 1936.

==== Move to NBC ====
On January 16, 1936, Gibney left KGW, KEX and Portland altogether and went back to San Francisco where he joined NBC-affiliated station KPO, (now KNBR). His first major job there was part of the cast of NBC Salutes KGW, a tribute to KGW in which many former and, at that time present, cast members celebrated KGW's unveiling of a 625-foot tower. Former employees at the celebration included Keating, Fleming, Helen Kleeb, Archie Presby, Jane Burns, Harry Anderson, Larry Allen, Mary Alice Moynihan, Glen Hurlbert & Dave Drummond. The special aired on August 14, 1937.

Gibney left KPO in July 1939 and began working for NBC Radio and Radio City in Hollywood. At that point, Gibney became the official West Coast announcer for NBC.

Within a year, Gibney could be heard announcing the Red Network's Hawthorne House and The Standard Symphony. He was also heard on the Blue Network's Speaking of Glamour and Capt. Flagg & Sgt. Quirt which both premiered in 1941.

Jimmie Fidler from Hollywood, a gossip columnist program, was Gibney's last announcing gig before he enlisted in the military.

==== Career during military ====
On July 8, 1942, Gibney enlisted in the military. He became a private in the U.S. Army Air Corps. Even while in the service, Gibney continued his career as an announcer on the radio broadcasting his shows from the West Coast Training Center in Santa Ana, California. All of the show's he produced during his time in the military also included an all-army cast.

Those shows were Uncle Sam Presents for the Red Network, Soldiers with Wings for CBS, Wings Over the West Coast for Mutual, and Hello Mom also for NBC.

On January 28, 1946, Gibney was discharged from the Radio Production Unit of the Army Air Corps and returned to Hollywood.

==== Career after military ====
Upon his return to Hollywood, Gibney immediately got back to work. He went back to Jimmie Fidler and also began announcing for two new shows; Names of Tomorrow Finding Stardom Today in 1947 and the single season The Dorothy Lamour Show in 1948.

==== Dragnet ====
On June 3, 1949; NBC Radio premiered one of the most memorable radio programs of all time:Dragnet. This was the start of a whole franchise which included two films and four television series. The series starred Jack Webb as Detective Sgt. Joe Friday and Barton Yarborough as Sgt. Ben Romero. Gibney shared announcing responsibilities with George Fenneman.

Gibney, alternating with Fenneman, was known for announcing the opening of the show which went:

Ladies and gentlemen... The story you are about to hear is true. Only the names have changed to protect the innocent.

Gibney stayed with the show until its end on the radio on February 26, 1957.

==== Other shows ====
Gibney served as the announcer for The Penny Singleton Show. The series premiered as a summer replacement series on May 30, 1950, on NBC radio. The series starred Penny Singleton, Jim Backus and Gale Gordon. He was also the announcer for the entire two-year run of Tales of the Texas Rangers starring Joel McCrea.

On September 23, 1953, Gibney began announcing another memorable radio program; The Six Shooter. The series starred James Stewart as Britt Ponset, a drifting cowboy during the final years of the wild west.

A typical opening that Gibney would announce would be the following:

The man in the saddle is angular and long-legged. His skin is sun-dyed brown. The gun in his holster is gray steel and rainbow mother-of-pearl, its handle unmarked. People call them both "the Six Shooter".

Gibney was later replaced as announcer by John Wald beginning in January 1954. The series ended June 25 of that year.

=== Television ===
Gibney first announced for a television show when the successful radio show Dragnet, (which Gibney also announced), premiered on NBC Television. The television version premiered on January 3, 1952. Gibney first announced for the show starting with the third episode.

Also starting with episode 3, each show ended with epilogue of sorts, narrated by Gibney, in which it was told the fate of the criminal and parties involved with the crime mentioned in any given episode. An example of this can be found below:

Tonight's episode is dedicated to radio officer Delmer E. Cook of the Los Angeles Police Department; who, on the afternoon of December 6, 1948, gave his life so that yours might be more secure.
– Dragnet episode 2

Gibney stayed with the show until its end on August 23, 1959.

Gibney also was the announcer for the original run of The Mickey Mouse Club on ABC from 1955 to 1959.

== Later years ==
On July 7, 1954, Gibney bought radio station KPAY in Chico, California. 17 months later, on December 28, 1955, a transfer of power was put into effect for $87,750. Power was transferred from Gibney to Jack O. Gross.

== Personal life ==
=== Marriages ===
- Gay W. Williams (1935–1941)
- Juanita V. Fields (1946–?)
- Marion L. McKinstry (1955–1970)
- Julie Pratt-Tripp (1971–1973)

== Death ==
Gibney died at his home in Isla Vista, California on June 5, 1973 of a heart attack. He was 61 years old. He was survived by wife Julie. Gibney's funeral was held on June 8, 1973 at the Goleta Cemetery District.
