= Ken Peters =

American baseball player

Kenneth Leroy Peters (June 27, 1915 – November 25, 2013) was a baseball player, actor and longtime superintendent of the Beverly Hills Unified School District.

Peters was born in the United States city of Orange, California. He attended the University of Southern California and played for the USC Trojans baseball team, where he was captain, until 1936. A second baseman, he formed a middle infield with shortstop Rod Dedeaux.

He acted in the films Mutiny on the Bounty and Death on the Diamond while at USC.

He was signed by the St. Louis Cardinals and played in their minor league system in 1936 and 1937. He played for the Sacramento Solons of the Pacific Coast League in 1936, hitting .206 with 70 hits in 97 games, and for the Mobile Shippers of the Southeastern League in 1937, hitting .167 in two games. Following his playing career, he served in the United States Navy during World War II from 1942 to 1945.

He served as superintendent of the Beverly Hills Unified School District from 1959 to 1981.

In 2010, he was awarded the USC Rossier Alumni Lifetime Achievement Award.

He died in Tarzana, California at the age of 98 on November 25, 2013.
