= Georgia Ellis =

American actress (1917–1988)

- Born: Georgia Blanche Hawkins; March 12, 1917; Ventura, California, U.S.
- Died: March 30, 1988 (aged 71); Woodland Hills, California, U.S.
- Occupation: Radio actress
- Years active: 1940–1960

Georgia Ellis (March 12, 1917 – March 30, 1988) was an American actress who is best known for her recurring role of Kitty in the Western radio drama Gunsmoke.

== Career ==
Ellis also used the name Georgia Hawkins, making her film debut under that name in The Light of Western Stars (1940). A news story at that time referred to her and another actress as "discoveries of Victor Jory."

Ellis appeared in the films Dragnet (1954), Penny Serenade (1940), Doomed Caravan (1941), and Light of the Western Stars (1940).

In addition to her work on Gunsmoke, Ellis was a member of the cast of Rogers of the Gazette. She also appeared on CBS Radio Workshop.

Ellis played a number of small roles on the Dragnet TV series in the 1950s.

== Personal life ==
She was the daughter of John R. Hawkins and Blanche E. Sparling.

She married fellow actor Thomas M. Skinner on August 31, 1941, in Yuma, Arizona. In 1948, she married Antony Ellis, a writer, producer, and director of radio and television shows; they met while appearing at the Pasadena Playhouse. She played Miss Kitty on Gunsmoke. They had a son, Jonathan.

She married Karl E. Puttfarken in Los Angeles on June 30, 1961. The bride's name on the marriage record is listed as Georgia B. Hawkins.
