= Johnny Madero, Pier 23 =

Radio detective radio drama series

- Genre: Detective adventure
- Running time: 30 minutes
- Country of origin: United States
- Language: English
- Syndicates: Mutual
- Starring: Jack Webb
- Announcer: Tony LaFrano
- Written by: Richard L. Breen; Herb Margolis; Lou Markheim
- Directed by: Nat Wolff
- Recording studio: Los Angeles
- Original release: April 24 – September 4, 1947
- Opening theme: I Cover the Waterfront

Johnny Madero, Pier 23 (sometimes listed as Johnny Modero, Pier 23 or Johnny Madero-Pier 23) was a 30-minute radio detective drama series which was broadcast on Mutual from Los Angeles on Thursdays at 8 p.m. from April 24, 1947, to September 4, 1947. It was the first nationwide program for star Jack Webb.

== Plots and cast ==
The storylines follow the footsteps of fast-talking, wisecracking Johnny Madero (Webb), who runs a boat shop on the San Francisco waterfront, rents boats and usually drops in for a weekly chat with Father Leahy (Gale Gordon). When investigating a crime, Madero manages to solve the mystery before tough cop Warchek (William Conrad). The supporting cast sometimes included Betty Lou Gerson, Elaine Burke, Bob Holden, Herb Butterfield, Irvin Lee and Herbert Rawlinson. The program came out a year after Pat Novak, for Hire (1946) originally aired and based in the same locale, San Francisco. It lasted a year before Pat Novak, for Hire returned to radio with Jack Webb back in the lead role.

== Other personnel ==
Harry Zimmerman provided the background music. Nat Wolff directed the scripts by Richard L. Breen, Herb Margolis and Lou Markheim. The program's announcer was Tony LaFrano.

== See also ==
- Pat Novak, for Hire

== Sources ==
- Winn, Dilys (1977). Murder Ink: The Mystery Reader's Companion. Workman Publishing Company. ISBN 978-0-89480-004-7.
