= Joe Friday =

Fictional police detective

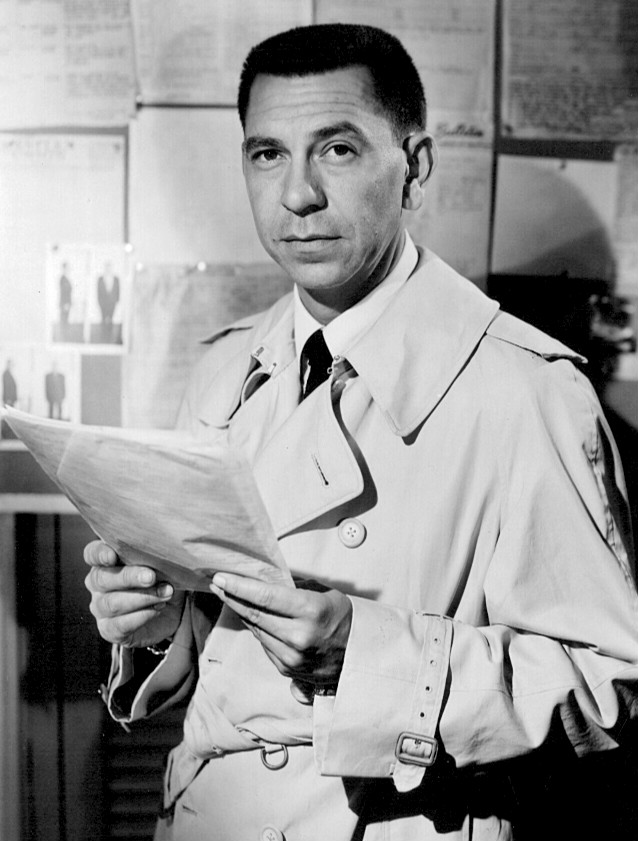
- Jack Webb as Joe Friday in Dragnet
- First appearance: Dragnet (1949)
- Last appearance: Dragnet (2003)
- Created by: Jack Webb
- Portrayed by: Jack Webb (1949–1959, 1967–1970); Dan Aykroyd (1987); Ed O'Neill (2003–2004)

In-universe information
- Gender: Male
- Occupation: Los Angeles police officer
- Rank: Sergeant; Lieutenant

Joseph Friday is a fictional character created and portrayed by Jack Webb as the lead for his series Dragnet. Friday is an experienced, straight arrow detective in the Los Angeles Police Department. The character first appeared on June 3, 1949, in the premiere of the NBC radio drama that launched the series. Webb played the character on radio and later television from 1949 to 1959 and again from 1967 to 1970, also appearing as Friday in a 1954 theatrical release and a 1966 made-for-TV film.

== Original series ==
Friday joins the LAPD shortly before World War II; Ben Romero was his first partner. After Friday was discharged from serving in the U.S. Army, he returned to the police and the pair eventually reunited in the Detective Division, prior to the events of the series.

Over the earlier run of the series, Friday was partnered with Sergeant Ben Romero (Barton Yarborough), Sergeant Ed Jacobs (Barney Phillips), Romero's nephew Officer Bill Lockwood (Martin Milner), and then (for the rest of the radio run as well as the 1951 television series and the 1954 film) Officer Frank Smith (first Herbert Ellis, then Ben Alexander). For the 1960s revival, Friday's partner was Officer Bill Gannon (Harry Morgan).

During the 1958–59 season, Friday was promoted to Lieutenant, but when the show was revived in 1967, he was again a Sergeant without any on-screen explanation; Webb later explained that in the real LAPD, the Lieutenant rank is a supervisory position and involves less time in the field, which would have changed the structure of the show.

Friday narrated every story, providing details in voiceover of what happened and where. He had several bits of consistently repeated dialogue.

In many openings, over stock footage of Los Angeles and its inhabitants, Friday would open with the words:

"This is the city. Los Angeles, California."

As the footage continued, Friday would give assorted details about Los Angeles, from its geography and history to its landmarks and population, the latter of which would often lead to observations about how most of the people are good while some go bad. Initially, this opening would conclude with the words "I'm a cop". This stock-footage oriented opening occurred in most, but not all, episodes of both the original black-and-white episodes and the color revival episodes. In some episodes, when the show was otherwise running a little long, the opening was trimmed down to:

"This is the city. Los Angeles, California. I work here... I'm a cop."

Though the "I'm a cop" conclusion to the opening narration was used in early episodes of the original series, several years in, the phrase was altered to:

"...I carry a badge".

This phrase was used through the later B&W episodes, and all color episodes.

What followed was the introduction of the story's plot:

"It was [day of the week, month and day; the year is never stated], it was [weather conditions, usually one word e.g. cloudy, hot, rainy] in Los Angeles; we were working the [day|night] watch out of [police division]. My partner is [name]. The boss is [title and name]. My name's Friday."

"Just the facts, ma'am" is a common catchphrase often attributed to Friday, or less often, to Stan Freberg's works parodying Dragnet. But neither used the exact phrase. While Friday typically used the phrase "All we want are the facts, ma'am" when questioning women in the course of police investigations, Freberg's spoof changed the line slightly to "I just want to get the facts, ma'am".

Friday carried a regulation .38 snub-nose Smith & Wesson Model 10 revolver, while Gannon had a four-inch .38 Smith & Wesson Model 15 revolver. In the Dragnet 1968 episode 2/2 "The Shooting Board", Joe Friday states that in his 15-year career as a police officer he had only had to unholster his service gun three times (including that episode), and had to "drop the hammer on a man" twice. His first time was in "The Big Thief", broadcast December 18, 1953, when he was forced to shoot and kill a fleeing robber who was firing at him: he had stopped off at an all-night laundromat to purchase a pack of cigarettes and caught someone attempting to slip-wire a change machine; he exchanged gunfire and killed the man, falling under investigation as there were no corroborating witnesses. However, this is inconsistent with the original TV and radio series, several episodes of which depicted Friday getting involved in shootouts, including "The Big Break", broadcast on March 19, 1953, which took place over the course of a year and included two shootouts.

=== Personal life ===
In his private life, Friday mostly kept to himself and maintained a low social profile. Like Webb, Friday was an Army veteran and a chain smoker, but in contrast to Webb (who married four times, including much-publicized marriages to Julie London and Jackie Loughery) Friday was a confirmed bachelor. This often did not go unnoticed by his partners who regularly but futilely advised Friday to marry and settle down. He casually kept company with Policewoman Dorothy Rivers in the early 1950s, and did not object to his mother's occasional attempts to match him with daughters of her friends. In the original series, Friday lived with his widowed mother in the house where she reared him at 1456 Collis Avenue, but later lived alone in a small apartment. In the 1951 TV series, Joe tells Frank that he has received a letter from his mother, who had moved East to an undisclosed city where she had bought a house down the street from her sister. In contrast, two of his most prominent partners, Frank Smith and Bill Gannon, were married with children.

In August 1951, Friday gave his age as 34, making him approximately three years older than Webb. Friday's birth date was given as April 2 (the same as Webb's) in the 1969 episode "Community Relations", but conflicts with that given in the 1954 radio episode "Big Shock", in which his partner attempts to give him a birthday present of fleece-lined slippers, and Friday says his birthday is August 30, not March 30. Like Webb, Friday grew up in Los Angeles and graduated from Belmont High School.

=== Badge 714 ===
When the original Dragnet went into syndication, the show was renamed "Badge 714", so named for Joe Friday's police badge. A recurring myth was that Jack Webb chose the number 714 because he was a fan of Babe Ruth, who slugged 714 home runs during his career, but it was later asserted in TV commentator Michael J. Hayde's book My Name's Friday that Webb originally wanted the badge number to be "777", tripling the lucky number 7, but decided instead to add the last two digits together to get "14", thus making the badge number "714".

The badge that Friday carried as a lieutenant during the final season of the 1951–59 series was ultimately used in real life by LAPD officer Dan Cooke. As a sergeant, Cooke had been assigned to be the LAPD's liaison with Webb during the production of the 1967–70 series. Just before filming started on the TV-movie that became the pilot for the revived series, Cooke found the badge that the LAPD had lent to Webb in the 1958–59 season. However, Webb informed Cooke that he wanted Friday to be a sergeant in the revived series, and, consequently, would not need the lieutenant's badge from the original show. Cooke put the unused badge in a desk drawer and forgot about it. Years later, after being promoted to lieutenant himself, Cooke found the badge and asked for permission to use it.

When Jack Webb died in 1982, LAPD Chief Daryl Gates officially retired Badge 714; Webb was also buried with full police honors, a first for a non-policeman.

Dragnet and spinoff Adam-12 were the only television shows to use actual LAPD badges.

In the show's heyday, people would regularly visit the LAPD asking to speak to Sgt. Friday. The official response given by the front desk was, "Sorry, it's Joe's day off."

In the FX show The Shield, about an LAPD anti-gang unit, one of the officers, Shane, lost his badge in season 2 and it was revealed to be badge number 714.

== 1955 Three Stooges parody ==
The Three Stooges, (Moe Howard, Larry Fine, and Shemp Howard) performed an 18-minute parody of Dragnet entitled the "Blunder Boys". After graduating with the lowest honors at criminology school, the stooges join the police force, and they track down a wanted criminal known as The Eel.

== 1987 film ==
Dan Aykroyd starred as the namesake and nephew of the original Friday in the 1987 Dragnet comedy adaptation film. Harry Morgan reprised his television role as Bill Gannon, now Captain, and Tom Hanks appeared as Friday's partner Pep Streebek. Webb's Friday appears in a photograph on his old LAPD work desk, which Aykroyd's Friday uses.

== 2003 series ==
Ed O'Neill starred as Joe Friday in Wolf Films' 2003 revival of Dragnet. Since the LAPD had discontinued the rank of Detective Sergeant, replacing it with the rank of Detective Three, or D-3, the rank banner on Friday's badge now said "Detective" instead of "Sergeant", and Friday was referred to as "Detective Friday" instead of "Sergeant Friday". During the first season of the series, Friday's partner was named "Frank Smith", played by Ethan Embry, but unlike the character played by Alexander and Ellis on the original series, this Frank Smith was not an experienced veteran officer, but a young detective mentored by Friday. On one episode of this show, Friday actually spoke the phrase, "Just the facts."

== Friday's partners ==
Sergeant Ben Romero (Barton Yarborough) (radio and television)
Sergeant Ed Jacobs (Barney Phillips) (radio and television)
Officer Bill Lockwood (Martin Milner/Ken Peters) (radio)
Officer Frank Smith (Ben Alexander, Harry Bartell, Herb Ellis, Vic Perrin, Ethan Embry) (radio, television and film)
Officer Bill Gannon (Harry Morgan) (television and film)

== Reception ==
In 2006, TV Land included the line "This is the city..." on its "The 100 Greatest TV Quotes and Catch Phrases" special.
