= George Fenneman =

American radio and television announcer (1919–1997)

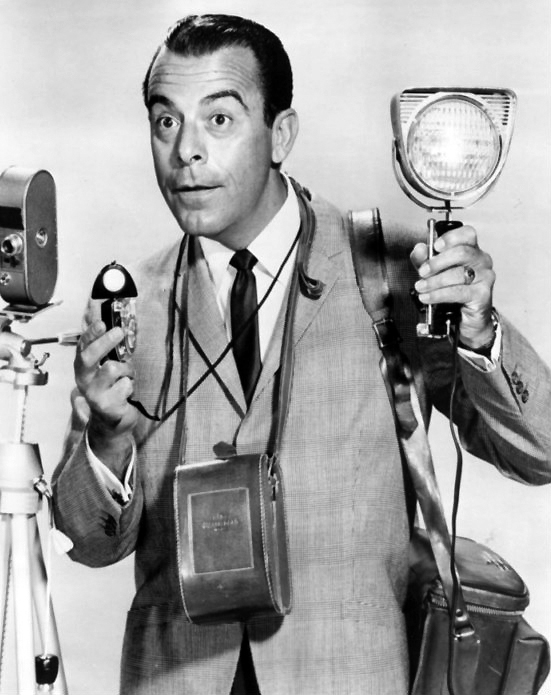
- Fenneman in Your Funny, Funny Films, 1963
- Born: George Watt Fenneman; November 10, 1919; Peking, China
- Died: May 29, 1997 (aged 77); Los Angeles, California, U.S.
- Occupations: Game show host, announcer
- Years active: 1942–1993
- Spouse: Peggy Clifford (m. 1943)
- Children: 3

George Watt Fenneman (November 10, 1919 – May 29, 1997) was an American radio and television announcer. Fenneman is best remembered as the show announcer and straight man on Groucho Marx's You Bet Your Life. Marx said of Fenneman in 1976, "There never was a comedian who was any good unless he had a good straight man, and George was straight on all four sides".

== Early life ==
Fenneman was born in Peking (now Beijing), China, the only child of Edgar Warfield and Jessico "Jessie" (née Watt) Fenneman. He was an infant when his parents moved to San Francisco, California, where he grew up. Fenneman's father was a certified public accountant and worked in the import-export business. His mother was an author and a minister of the Divine Art of Living. When Fenneman was eight, he wrote and starred in his own drama before his neighborhood friends in the basement of his home. Fenneman grew up in San Francisco's West Portal district.

== Education ==
Fenneman graduated from San Francisco Polytechnic High School. In 1942 he graduated from San Francisco State College with a B.A. in Speech and Drama.

== Military service ==
Poor eyesight and asthma prevented Fenneman from military action in World War II. Fenneman became a broadcast correspondent for the U.S. Office of War Information, where he met Jack Webb, a fellow staff announcer who would later hire him for Webb's Dragnet radio and TV series. Fenneman's work in the Army included announcing the wartime service show Sound Off!.

In the early part of World War II, he and college classmate Bob Sweeney formed a stand-up comedy team and entertained troops at military bases.

== Broadcast career ==
=== Radio ===
In 1941, Fenneman was hired by KSFO (AM) radio for $35 per week. He immediately found himself hosting the show Lunch at the Top of the Mark. The 22-year-old Fenneman's first interview that day was the actor Boris Karloff. In 1942, Fenneman took a job as a radio announcer and actor at KGO (AM), increasing his salary to $55 per week. His first acting role on the station was the early California bandit Joaquin Murrieta in the production Golden Days.

Returning to broadcasting in 1946 following World War II, he moved to Los Angeles. "I figured if you're going to be in this business, you've got to be in southern California". In 1948, the George Fenneman Show was heard weekdays at 4:00 p.m. on KECA (AM) radio in Los Angeles. Fenneman was reported to be "one of the better radio voices". In 1948, Fenneman was an announcer for the Abbott and Costello radio show. He became the announcer on the Coca-Cola Victory Parade of Spotlight Bands, heard on over 168 radio stations on the NBC Blue Network.

== You Bet Your Life ==
Fenneman is best remembered as the announcer and good-natured sidekick for Groucho Marx's comedy/quiz show You Bet Your Life. He won the audition as the radio show's announcer in 1947. Fenneman stayed with the show when it moved to television in 1950, on NBC where it remained for 11 years. Fenneman was known as "Groucho Marx's man Friday, who helps him on Wednesdays (on radio) and Thursdays (on TV)".

Fenneman's voice, looks, and manner provided the ideal foil for Marx's antics and ad libs.

Robert "Bob" Dwan, director of You Bet Your Life, said "He had a naturally good voice." One day, Fenneman met Dwan at Hollywood and Vine in Los Angeles during his lunch hour. Dwan told Fenneman to immediately go to a studio where auditions were being held for a new Groucho Marx program. Dwan said Fenneman's demeanor made him the perfect straight man for the show. Initially hired for $55 per week, Fenneman's salary reportedly grew to "more than $50,000 per year".

Dwan said "He was the perfect foil for Groucho. We didn't pick him for that reason, however. We picked him because he was very bright, someone who could keep track of the quiz score and do the math on the spot. George's main principle was that he didn't tell the jokes, no matter how good a reply he might have. He knew what his role was, and he was, above all, a gentleman." Fenneman got the job, and was paid $55 a week to start. Groucho frequently encouraged contestants to bet odd amounts, making the arithmetic difficult to keep straight on the fly during a live show. Dwan said "Groucho had a tendency to get them (the show's contestants) to bet odd amounts, like $17.36. So George had a bit of a task." Fenneman said he was "a spring-board of interplay" between Marx and himself. "I was the foil for a lot of his wit. It was sheer trauma for me. I showed up every night and prayed."

Fenneman was a resilient target of Marx's frequent mispronunciations of his name ("Feminine") and other light-hearted teasing. "Groucho called Fenneman the male Margaret Dumont", according to Frank Ferrante, who portrayed Marx onstage in Groucho: A Life in Revue. "George took it as the highest praise. Groucho called him the perfect straight man."

Fenneman said "I was the gentleman, the nice fellow. Older ladies who would watch the show would see me as their son. Oh, the letters they used to write, castigating mean old Groucho for being cruel to that nice young man."

When a young female contestant referred to Fenneman as "Mr. Fidderman", Marx ordered Fenneman onstage and accused him of leading a "double life". On one episode Fenneman was suspended in a harness as a substitute for the show's stuffed duck that was dropped from overhead with a $100 payoff in its beak when a contestant said the secret word during every episode. Fenneman's wife said "Everyone had told Groucho 47 times before the show, 'Don't touch him', so George came down, and Groucho immediately came over and pushed him; and he turned upside down. He was absolutely terrified."

Fenneman said of working with Marx, "I can't impress on you too much what it meant to be working with a legend. I was 30 years old and working with this man who was 60 at the time, who'd been the biggest star of all the media."

=== Success in reruns ===
George Fenneman remained a familiar personality into the 1960s and 1970s, due in large part to two widespread revivals of You Bet Your Life. It was customary practice, established in radio, for a successful network series to take the Summer months off and return in the Fall. A Summer-replacement series, usually a musical or comedy half-hour, would fill the established time slot for 13 weeks until the parent program returned. You Bet Your Life was the first network TV series to continue into the Summer months, with reruns of some of the previous season's better episodes. To inform the public that these Summer broadcasts were repeats and not new programs, the Summer show was titled The Best of Groucho, and 13 reruns were selected each year, beginning in 1952.

After You Bet Your Life ended its network run in 1961, NBC's syndication department prepared new versions of the 1950s shows, with all mentions of the original sponsor removed or cropped out of the picture. Of the 529 filmed half-hours, NBC packaged 250 for syndication, dating mostly from the last half of the series' run. Because the reruns had already been established as The Best of Groucho, the syndicated version took that title, and was an immediate hit: in September, 1961, NBC Films announced that 40 major markets had already bought the show, and predicted that more than 150 stations would follow. Most stations opted to air The Best of Groucho on weekdays, five times a week. Stations across America broadcast the show mornings, afternoons, evenings, and late-nights. WPIX in New York programmed it at 11:00 p.m., and sponsors bought up all the commercial time before the show was even broadcast.

Gradually the show fell out of fashion, as faster-paced game shows videotaped in color forced the old, leisurely black-and-white show off the air. The show remained a memory until 1973, when Groucho Marx accepted a huge shipment of old film prints from an NBC warehouse. Producer John Guedel, anxious to see if there was still a market for the show, sold it on a trial basis to a local station for less than $50 for each night. It was programmed at 11:00 p.m., coincidentally following the successful WPIX model when the show was first syndicated. The Best of Groucho became an instant success, prompting Guedel to send the reruns into syndication almost immediately.

George Fenneman remained friends with Marx until the latter's death in 1977. During that year, Fenneman recalled he was walking a frail Groucho Marx back to his bed during one of his last visits and Marx quietly whispered "Fenneman, you always were a lousy dancer."

== Dragnet ==
Fenneman was one of a pair of announcers on Dragnet. He shared narration duties with Hal Gibney on radio and the original 1951 Dragnet television series, and then with John Stephenson when Dragnet returned to TV in 1967. It was Fenneman's voice which announced, "The story you are about to see is true. The names have been changed to protect the innocent", while Stephenson would be heard at the end of the episode describing the court trials and verdicts.

On radio, Fenneman also provided the intro to the finale (and last commercial): "On (date), trial was held in Department (number), Superior Court of the State of California. In a moment, the results of that trial. Now, here is our star, Jack Webb, for (sponsor)". Webb frequently answered the cue with "Thank you, George" or "Thank you, George Fenneman," as Fenneman was not identified in the show's credits, which were read by Gibney and ended with "Hal Gibney speaking".

== Gunsmoke ==
He was the principal commercial announcer for the radio version of Gunsmoke, and frequently introduced "Matt Dillon" (William Conrad) after the episode to extol the virtues of L&M or Chesterfield cigarettes.

=== Residual income from announcing ===
Fenneman purchased a 10% interest in the You Bet Your Life production company. "I had a good lawyer" Fenneman said. "Instead of the usual residuals, I get a percentage of the gross revenues (from You Bet Your Life)". Fenneman also received residual payments for Dragnet. "Every time you see the show and hear me say 'The story you are about to see is true. Only the names have been changed to protect the innocent', I get a pay check. A small one, but they add up".

== Other TV showcases ==
=== The Dean Martin and Jerry Lewis Show ===
Fenneman also announced the Dean Martin and Jerry Lewis Comedy Show, sponsored by Chesterfield cigarettes. Fenneman said Martin and Lewis would shower him with sheet music or cut off his tie while he was on camera selling cigarettes. On one episode, Fenneman spoofed himself. During a parody of You Bet Your Life, on the broadcast of October 14, 1952, "Groucho Martin" (Dean Martin) asks Fenneman to remind listeners about how "the other couple" is doing. Fenneman said "The sponsor and the sponsor's wife are way ahead with eighteen million dollars".

=== Game shows ===
Fenneman also hosted many game shows: in 1953, Your Claim To Fame, a panel quiz show sponsored by the Regal Amber Brewing Company of San Francisco, Anybody Can Play in 1958 with Dolores Reed, The Perfect Husband, Who In The World and Your Surprise Package in 1961. Fenneman hosted an un-aired pilot episode of Take My Advice, an NBC game show where a celebrity panel offered advice to contestants about how to handle personal problems. In 1966 he hosted two pilot episodes for Crossword, a game show that would be renamed The Cross-Wits in 1975 and aired with Jack Clark as host.

=== Commercial production company ===
Fenneman formed the "George Fenneman Productions (Ltd.)" commercial production company in 1962. His first client was the Douglas Fir Plywood Association. He also created commercials for the Paper Mate pen company.

He was the commercial spokesman for Lipton Tea during much of the 1960s, and in that role appeared on The Ed Sullivan Show when The Beatles made their second U.S. TV appearance on February 16, 1964. The entire episode (including commercials) had been taped at Miami Beach, Florida's Hotel Deauville prior to broadcast.

Fenneman also recorded commercials for Philip Morris. From 1978 to the end of his life in 1995, Fenneman was both the public relations spokesperson and commercial announcer for the Los Angeles-based Home Savings & Loan.

=== Television show host ===
In 1963, he hosted an ABC television program called Your Funny, Funny Films, a precursor to America's Funniest Home Videos. He was also host of a highly regarded KCET-TV program, On Campus.

On January 14, 1964, Fenneman hosted the half-hour special, Here Comes a Star. During the special, Fenneman led the audience on a tour of the then brand new Hanna-Barbera Animation Studio on Cahuenga Boulevard in Hollywood, California. Fenneman interviewed Bill Hanna and Joe Barbera as they readied their newest cartoon show The Magilla Gorilla Show. The show featured story artists, layout men, animators, inkers and painters putting together the first Magilla Gorilla cartoon. The show ended with the completed premiere episode of the cartoon.

In 1974, Fenneman co-hosted Talk About Pictures, an Emmy Award-winning program created by Life magazine photographer Leigh Wiener. The show featured a wide-ranging cross-section of photographers and photography collectors including Ansel Adams, Alfred Eisenstaedt and Graham Nash. 130 episodes were broadcast on NBC's Los Angeles affiliate KNBC. The show won a local Emmy award in 1974.

== Announcing career ==
Fenneman was the announcer for a number of radio shows, including Pete Kelly's Blues, The Orson Welles Show, The Eddie Albert Show and The Hedda Hopper Show. He was also an announcer on television shows as well, including The Life of Riley, The Jim Nabors Hour and The Donny & Marie Show. He was also one of the rotating announcers on the radio program Go Navy! The Navy Swings, a public-service series that aired from 1957 to 1970. Fenneman described the show as "a labor of love".

Fenneman also narrated many commercial and industrial films including work for Lockheed Aviation and the Jet Propulsion Laboratory in Pasadena, California.

=== The Simpsons ===
Fenneman narrated The Simpsons season 5 episode "Marge on the Lam" broadcast on November 4, 1993. The episode's closing sequence is a reference to Dragnet. Fenneman recorded the episode's ending in a Dragnet-style summation of the three principal characters' fates.

=== Spurious credits ===
Oft-repeated statements that Fenneman is the voice of the US Naval Observatory Master Clock or the National Institute of Standards and Technology's radio station WWV are untrue. Those announcements were actually performed by Fred Covington (1928–1993).

== Acting career ==
=== Radio actor ===
Fenneman played Buzz, the co-pilot on the radio show I Fly Anything, a radio adventure drama, broadcast on ABC from November 29, 1950, until July 19, 1951.

=== Film and television actor ===
He appeared on screen in the 1951 film The Thing from Another World as "Dr. Redding", Fenneman was a neighbor of The Thing from Another World's director, Christian Nyby. A spontaneous on-set script revision convinced Fenneman his future was not in movie acting. Producer Howard Hawks took a long scientific speech away from Robert O. Cornthwaite's character Dr. Carrington, preferring to give exposition to a minor character (Fenneman). The scene was "the most difficult to shoot" in the science fiction film. Fellow cast member Kenneth Tobey said "George didn't even know what he was talking about, and it took him thirty takes to get through the speech". As a radio performer accustomed to reading from a script and not used to quick memorization, Fenneman stumbled over the technical gobbledegook ("We have the time of arrival on the seismograph..."), resulting in multiple takes of the scene. In the final film, viewers can see the other actors trying not to smile as Fenneman spouts the lines.

In the 1950s, he made appearances in serialized science and nature themed segments on The Mickey Mouse Club, including a February 1957 appearance as Dr. Bill Richards, who undertakes a difficult expedition into the wilderness in The Secret Of Mystery Lake.

Fenneman portrayed Randy Rambo in The Tom Ewell Show episode "The Prying Eye," broadcast on March 28, 1961. On October 20, 1966, he appeared as a newsman in "The Yegg Foes of Gotham", episode 48 of the Batman TV show.

In 1967 Fenneman appeared in the film adaptation of the Broadway show How to Succeed in Business Without Really Trying as himself. In the film, he portrayed the host of a new television show who is introduced as "George Fenneman". He is credited at the end as "TV Announcer".

== Personal life ==
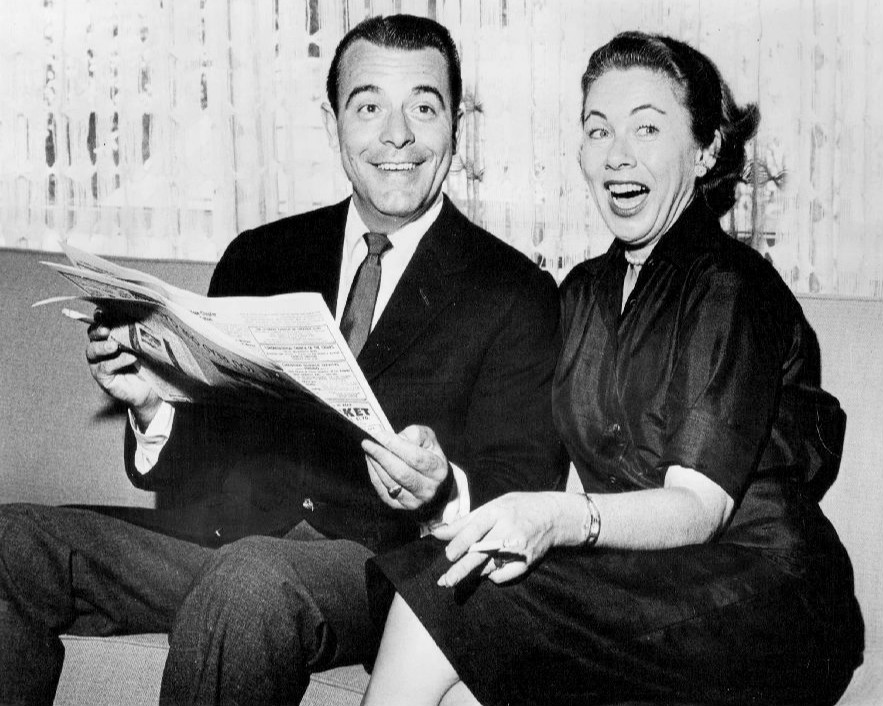
George and Peggy Fenneman, 1958

Fenneman married his college sweetheart, Margaret "Peggy" Jane Clifford in 1943. They had three children. He died from respiratory failure at his home in Los Angeles, California, on May 29, 1997, at the age of 77. Fenneman's body was cremated, and the location of ashes is unknown.

== Awards ==
- 1981 — Hollywood Walk of Fame, 1500 Vine Street (location)
- 1974 — National Academy of Television Arts and Sciences, Los Angeles Chapter, Regional "Emmy" Award, Information Series - Talk About Pictures.
- 1956 — Best Announcer, Television Critics of the United States, Motion Picture Daily and Fame magazines
- 1955 — Best Announcer, Television Critics of the United States, Motion Picture Daily and Fame magazines
- 1954 — Best Announcer, Television Critics of the United States, Motion Picture Daily and Fame magazines
- 1953 — Best Announcer, Television Critics of the United States, Motion Picture Daily and Fame magazines
- 1951 — Best Announcer, Television Critics of the United States, Motion Picture Daily and Fame magazines

== Filmography ==
| Year | Title | Role | Notes |
|---|---|---|---|
| 1951 | The Thing from Another World | Dr. Redding | Uncredited |
| 1953 | Tanga-Tika | Narrator | |
| 1953 | Mystery Lake | Bill Richards | |
| 1954 | Stormy, the Thoroughbred | Narrator | |
| 1954 | The World Dances | Narrator | |
| 1958 | A Question of Romance | Quizmaster | |
| 1960 | Ocean's 11 | On Phone Talking to Sheriff Wimmer | Voice, Uncredited |
| 1960 | The Horse with the Flying Tail | Narrator | |
| 1967 | How to Succeed in Business Without Really Trying | Himself / TV Announcer | |
| 1969 | Once You Kiss a Stranger | Announcer | |
| 1971 | Big Jake | Narrator (voice) | Uncredited |
| 1981 | The Marx Brothers in a Nutshell | Himself / TV Announcer | PBS, 1981–82 |
| 1983 | Those Wonderful TV Game Shows | Himself / TV Announcer | NBC, 1983–84 |
| 1991 | Here He Is... The One, The Only... Groucho | Himself / TV Announcer | HBO, 1991–92 |
| 2005 | The Naked Monster | Narrator (voice) | Final film role |
