= Dragnet (franchise) =

Radio, television, and film series, mostly about LAPD detective Joe Friday

- Dragnet opening frame from the 1950s television series
- Created by: Jack Webb
- Original work: Radio series
- Owners: Mark VII Limited; Universal Pictures
- Years: 1949–2004

Films and television
- Films: 1954 film (1954); 1987 film (1987)
- Television series: List: 1951 television series (1951–1959); 1967 television series (1967–1970); 1989 television series (1989–1991); 2003 television series (2003–2004)
- Television film: 1969 television film (1969)

Audio
- Radio program: 1949 radio drama (1949–1957)
- Original music: "Dragnet"

Dragnet is an American media franchise created by actor and producer Jack Webb and owned by his company Mark VII Limited and Universal Pictures. It follows Los Angeles Police Department (LAPD) Detective Joe Friday and his partners as they conduct by-the-book police work and solve crimes in Los Angeles. Originating as a radio drama on NBC in 1949, Dragnet has been adapted into several successful television shows and films. Its name is derived from the police term "dragnet", a system of coordinated measures for apprehending criminals or suspects.

Dragnet is one of the most influential police procedural crime dramas in American media history. Webb's aim in creating Dragnet was a realistic depiction of policing. The series portrayed police work as dangerous and heroic, and helped shape public perception of law enforcement in the 20th century, improving the American public's opinion of police officers.

== Actual cases ==
The opening of "The story you are about to hear is true" is derived from the fact that many works in the franchise are based on official LAPD case files. In some cases, the source material has been identified, including the following:

- "Sullivan Kidnapping – The Wolf" (Radio, 1949) – The 1927 kidnapping and murder of Marion Parker.
- "The Big Thank You" (Radio, 1950) – Louise Peete's post-prison years and third murder, which led to her becoming the second of only four women to be executed in the California gas chamber.
- 1969 TV movie – The killing spree of serial killer Harvey Glatman in the late 1950s. Pierce Brooks, an LAPD captain who was involved in Glatman's arrest and interrogation, served as a technical advisor for the film.

== Radio ==
Dragnet began as a radio series, running on the NBC radio network from 1949 to 1957.

== Television ==
=== 1951–1959 original ===
In 1951, Dragnet shifted to the field of television, running on NBC from 1951 to 1959. Most early episodes of the television series were dubbed or lip-synced adaptations of episodes of the radio show, but later episodes were original plotlines. Most of the cast members were veteran radio actors who could be relied upon to read the matter-of-fact dialogue naturally. A syndicated version of the series used the name Badge 714 to distinguish it from the network show. Friday's police badge number was 714.

=== 1967–1970 revival ===
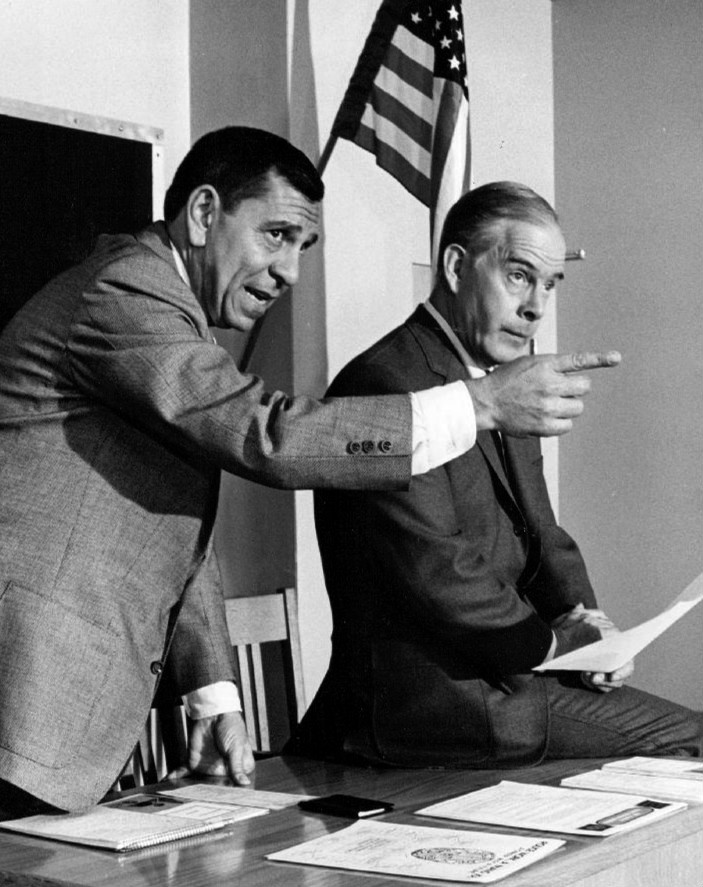
Webb and Morgan in 1968

Webb relaunched Dragnet in 1966, with NBC once again chosen to air the series. He tried to persuade Ben Alexander to rejoin him as Frank Smith. Alexander was then committed to an ABC police series, Felony Squad, and the producers would not release him. Webb reluctantly came up with a new character to take the role of Joe Friday's partner, calling upon his longtime friend Harry Morgan to play Officer Bill Gannon. Morgan had previously portrayed rooming-house proprietor Luther Gage in the 1949 radio series episode "James Vickers". George Fenneman returned as the show's primary announcer, with John Stephenson replacing Hal Gibney in the role of announcing the trial dates and subsequent punishments for the offenders. Fenneman replaced Stephenson in that role during the fourth season. Unlike the previous Dragnet series, the revival was produced and aired in color.

Webb produced a TV movie pilot for the new version of the show for Universal Television, although the pilot was not aired until January 1969. NBC bought the show on the strength of the movie, and it debuted as a midseason replacement for the sitcom The Hero on Thursday nights in January 1967. To distinguish it from the original, the year was included in the title of the show (i.e., Dragnet 1967). Although Friday had been promoted to lieutenant in the final episode of the 1950s production, Webb chose to have Friday revert to sergeant with his familiar badge, "714".

When real-life LAPD Sergeant Dan Cooke, Webb's contact in the department during production of the revived Dragnet series, was promoted to lieutenant, he arranged to carry the same lieutenant's badge, number 714, as worn by Joe Friday. Cooke was technical advisor to the KNBC documentary Police Unit 2A-26, directed by John Orland. He brought that to the attention of Webb, who hired Orland to direct and film This Is the City, a series of minidocumentaries about Los Angeles that preceded most TV episodes during the 1969 and 1970 seasons. The show had good ratings on NBC's schedule for four seasons (although its popularity at that time did not exceed that of the 1950s version), but the show was canceled after the completion of the 1969-1970 season.

Much as was done 11 years earlier, Webb decided voluntarily to discontinue Dragnet after its fourth season to focus on producing and directing his other projects through Mark VII Limited. The first of these projects was titled Adam-12, a 30-minute police procedural similar to Dragnet, but focusing on patrol officers rather than detectives. The series premiered in the fall of 1968, while Dragnet 1969 was in production, and ran for seven seasons, coming to an end in 1975. In 1971, with producer Robert A. Cinader, Webb developed another pilot originally intended to be centered around the staff of a Los Angeles–area medical center's emergency room. While researching the pilot, Webb and Cinader were introduced to the Los Angeles County Fire Department's fledgling paramedic program; the premise was reworked to include the Fire Department, and Emergency! was born, running as a weekly series until 1977, and as a series of made-for-television movies for two years after that. Emergency! was centered on the then-fictitious Los Angeles County Fire Department paramedic rescue unit, Squad 51.

During the early 1970s, reruns of this version of Dragnet were popular on local stations, usually broadcast during the late afternoon or early evenings. From 1991 to 1995, Dragnet was shown on Nick at Nite, then moved to its sister cable channel TV Land. From October 1, 2011, to April 26, 2013, the series ran daily on the digital cable channel Antenna TV, and before that, the show aired on the Retro Television Network.

Dragnet was broadcast Monday through Friday on Me-TV. The show was part of the "CriMe TV" morning block with Perry Mason and The Rockford Files, with Dragnet shown back-to-back from 11:00 am until 12:00 pm. In December 2014, Me-TV added a third airing of Dragnet to its late-night lineup; the series airs at 12:30 am following a second episode of Perry Mason. Me-TV ended the run of Dragnet on January 1, 2015, whereupon it became part of Cozi TV's regular lineup until its removal in December 2019. In January 2020, Dragnet returned to MeTV along with its sibling series Adam-12 after Cozi dropped both series. Dragnet currently broadcasts 2 episodes Sundays through Fridays at 5am & 5:30am EST. On August 19, 2024, Dragnet made its debut on FETV, currently airing weekday mornings at 8:10am EST.

=== Dragnet 1984 revival and Webb's later years ===
In late 1982, Webb began working on a revival of Dragnet. Departing from the original format (with Harry Morgan tied up with his commitments to M*A*S*H, and its already greenlit followup AfterMASH), Webb himself would not appear in the series as Sgt. Joe Friday (other than in voice over), and approached former Adam-12 stars Martin Milner and Kent McCord (who had several guest appearances early in the 1967 revival series) to reprise their roles as now-detectives Malloy and Reed in the updated Dragnet 1984 series. Days after speaking with McCord about the project, on December 23, 1982, Webb died unexpectedly from a heart attack and the Dragnet revival was scrapped.

After Webb's death, LAPD Chief Daryl Gates announced that badge number 714—Webb's number on the television show—was retired, and Los Angeles city offices lowered their flags to half staff. At Webb's funeral, the LAPD provided an honor guard, and the chief of police commented on Webb's connection with the LAPD. An LAPD auditorium was named in his honor. Jack Webb's LAPD sergeant's badge and ID card are on display at the Los Angeles Police Academy.

== Film versions ==
=== Dragnet (1954) ===
In 1954, a theatrical feature film titled Dragnet, an adaptation of the series, was released with Webb, Alexander, and Richard Boone. Dennis Weaver plays R. A. Lohrman, a detective captain. The film begins with the shooting of small-time hood Miller Starkie (Dub Taylor) on orders from his boss, Max Troy (Stacy Harris). Friday and Smith's superior is LAPD Intelligence Division Captain Jim Hamilton (Boone), a department member and the film's technical advisor. The Intelligence Division focused on the pursuit of organized-crime figures, and some of Max Troy's habits resemble that of Mickey Cohen, the known Los Angeles underworld boss; for example, Troy's LAPD file reads that he could be found at "Sunset Strip taverns and joints", as could Cohen. The film depicts the working relationship between the LAPD and the Los Angeles County District Attorney's office; Friday and Smith work to gather evidence that the DA's office deems sufficient to gain the indictment and ultimate conviction of Troy and his fellows. One scene contains a violent fist-fight involving the two detectives, with the close-up cinematic technique typical of Webb's style of direction. The movie's ending represents a departure from most Dragnet stories; no arrest is made at the story's conclusion. Chester Davitt (Willard Sage), Troy's underling and Starkie's killer, is killed by underworld figures, and Troy succumbs to cancer before the detectives, having gathered sufficient evidence against him, can make the arrest.

The film earned an estimated $4.7 million at the North American box office during its first year of release.

=== Dragnet 1966 (aired 1969) ===
Dragnet 1966 is a made-for-TV movie that initiated the return of the Dragnet series to television. It was produced as the TV pilot for Dragnet 1967, but was not broadcast until 1969. The movie stars Jack Webb as Sgt. Friday and Harry Morgan as Officer Bill Gannon. The story focuses on crime more typical of the 1960s than of the previous Dragnet era; the detectives are assigned to find a voyeuristic serial killer similar to Harvey Glatman (played by Vic Perrin, who appeared in the 1954 film as an assistant district attorney). Also appearing is Virginia Gregg, who had a role in the 1954 feature and was a frequent guest actress in the 1951–59 series and the 1967–70 episodes, and John Roseboro, a catcher for the Los Angeles Dodgers, who dabbled in acting in the off season; Roseboro played a plainclothes detective who had been the target of racial slurs by a child molester until Friday came to his aid.

=== Dragnet (1987) ===
In 1987, a comedy film version of Dragnet was released starring Dan Aykroyd as the stiff Joe Friday (nephew of the original Sergeant Joe Friday), and Tom Hanks as his partner, Detective Pep Streebeck. The film contrasted the terse, clipped character of Friday, a hero from an earlier age, with the "real world" of Los Angeles in 1987 to broad comedic effect. Apart from Aykroyd's spot-on imitation of Webb's Joe Friday and Harry Morgan reprising his role of Bill Gannon (now Captain), the film version has few similarities with previous incarnations. This Dragnet parody was a hit with audiences, though no sequel was produced. LAPD Lieutenant Dan Cooke, who had served as technical advisor for the Jack Webb series, was also technical advisor for this production.

== Remakes after Webb's death ==
=== Dragnet (1989 TV series)/The New Dragnet (1989) ===
A revival of Dragnet by The Arthur Company, titled The New Dragnet, aired in first-run syndication in tandem with The New Adam-12, a revival of the Jack Webb series Adam-12. Like The New Adam-12, The New Dragnet had entirely different characters, music, and presentation compared to the original series, and starred Jeff Osterhage as Detective Vic Daniels, Bernard White as Detective Carl Molina, and initially Don Stroud as Captain Lussen and later Thalmus Rasulala as Captain Bolz.

Fifty-two episodes were aired over two seasons. The first season aired from October 24, 1989, to January 21, 1990; the second season aired from April 19, 1990, to September 9, 1990.

=== L.A. Dragnet (2003) ===
In 2003, a Dragnet series was produced by Dick Wolf, the producer of NBC's Law & Order series and spin-offs. It aired on ABC, and starred Ed O'Neill as Joe Friday and Ethan Embry as Frank Smith. After a 12-episode season that followed the traditional formula, the format of the series was changed to an ensemble crime drama in an attempt to boost ratings. (The change apparently reflected Webb's intentions for the 1980s revival series, with Joe Friday promoted again to lieutenant and overseeing a pair or group of younger detectives.)

In L.A. Dragnet, Friday was promoted to lieutenant with less screen time and Frank Smith was written out, in favor of a younger and ethnically diverse cast played by Eva Longoria, Desmond Harrington, Evan Dexter Parke, and Christina Chang. Roselyn Sánchez was added to the regular cast in a few episodes. With the Dragnet formula no longer in place, the program had the feel of a typical procedural drama. It was cancelled five episodes into its second season. Three episodes premiered on USA Network in early 2004, with the final two on the Sleuth channel in 2006. In other countries such as the Netherlands, the show is retitled Murder Investigation.

== Related works ==
=== Music ===
The theme from Dragnet has been recorded by many artists, achieving popular success. Artists who charted with it include Ray Anthony (1953) and The Art of Noise (1987).

=== Nonfiction ===
- In 1958, Webb authored The Badge, a book containing chapters of true stories told from the view of a patrolman, sergeant, lieutenant, and others. It had a number of photographs and recently was reissued with a foreword by James Ellroy, author of L.A. Confidential, which features a fictional show, Badge of Honor, modeled after Dragnet.
- In 2001, Michael J. Hayde wrote My Name's Friday: The Unauthorized But True Story of "Dragnet" and the Films of Jack Webb, with a foreword by Harry Morgan (Bill Gannon).

=== Parodies ===
- The Little Shop of Horrors, a 1960 cult classic comedy horror film by Roger Corman, features a parody of the traditional Dragnet dry, hard-boiled voiceover narration throughout, and in the second half of the film, an onscreen parody of Dragnet and Joe Friday's robotic stoicism, a police detective named Joe Fink who says in voiceover "My name is Fink. Joe Fink... I'm a fink".
- "St. George and the Dragonet", a 1953 short audio satire by Stan Freberg, was a smash hit reaching number one on both the Billboard and the Cash Box record charts. In this satire, Freberg used the line "Just the facts, ma'am", which entered popular lexicography as an actual catchphrase from Dragnet, despite the line never being used on the show, except for Season Two, Episode Eight ("Big Lease"). Freberg followed "St. George..." with "Little Blue Riding Hood" and "Christmas Dragnet".
- The 1954 Woody Woodpecker cartoon Under the Counter Spy was a parody of Dragnet. At the beginning, a narrator says, "The story you are about to see is a big fat lie. No names have been changed to protect anybody!" At the end, a hammer and stamp make the words "THE END", and the hammerer hits his thumb.
- The 1955, Three Stooges short Blunder Boys parodies Dragnet. In place of the familiar "Dragnet" theme, the first four notes of "The Song of the Volga Boatmen", which is in the public domain, is used. At the end of the film, Moe stamps Larry's head with a hammer; Larry's forehead then reads, "VII 1/2 The End".
- A 1956 Looney Tunes short, Rocket Squad, starred Daffy Duck and Porky Pig as Sgt. Joe Monday and Det. Schmoe Tuesday, respectively. Daffy narrated, giving a running timeline in the manner of Sgt. Friday. This police adventure ends with both officers convicted and imprisoned for false arrest. The opening title reads: "Ladies and Gentlemen, the story you are about to see is true. The drawings have been changed to protect the innocent". Another short, Tree Cornered Tweety, featured Tweety imitating the narrator of Dragnet as he is being pursued by Sylvester again.
- A segment of the Rocky and Bullwinkle cartoon show called "Bullwinkle's Corner", which featured Bullwinkle Moose in a poetry reading of "Tom, Tom the Piper's Son," parodied Dragnet, as Bullwinkle is apprehended in the act of stealing a pig by two detectives who interrogate Bullwinkle using a terse, clipped monotone similar in style to Joe Friday and Frank Smith ("You got a name?" "I'm Tom, Tom the Piper's Son." "All right, Piperson, what were you going to do with the pig?").
- A 1968 sketch entitled the "Copper Clapper Caper" during Jack Webb's appearance on The Tonight Show Starring Johnny Carson. Webb reprised Friday interviewing the equally deadpan victim of a robbery (played by Carson). The details of the crime started with the alliterative "k" or "kl" consonant sound, such as "Claude Cooper, the kleptomaniac from Cleveland."
- A Sesame Street Muppet skit from the early 1970s, "Dragnet" featured Sgt. Thursday and his partner, Ben, searching for a fugitive letter ”W” using a drawing Ben carries with him of the letter; when they do encounter the letter W it disguises itself turning upside down into a letter “M”.
- The final segment of each episode of PBS's Square One was titled "Mathnet" and opened with the Dragnet theme and an arrangement of the lines "The story you're about to see is a fib—but it's short. The names are made up, but the problems are real." Each story arc of the show's five-season run lasted five daily episodes (one week) and featured detectives Kate Monday (seasons 1–3) or Pat Tuesday (seasons 4–5) and George Ernest Frankly (all five seasons), of the LAPD in the first two of the show's five seasons and the New York Police Department in the last three seasons, using mathematics to solve crimes.
- Isaac Air Freight, a Christian sketch comedy troupe, parodied Dragnet twice: on their 1978 album Fun in the Son (track 11, "Jerusalem Dragnet") and 1980 album Foolish Guy to Confound the Wise (track 8, "Jerusalem Dragnet II").
- In 1983, "Prog #310" of UK sci-fi comic 2000AD featured a time-travelling parody of Dragnet in the story "Chrono Cops", written by Alan Moore and illustrated by Dave Gibbons. In five pages, "Joe Saturday" and "Ed Thursday" encounter several time-travel "tropes", including a character attempting to kill his own great-grandfather.
- The season-five episode of The Simpsons titled "Marge on the Lam" centers around Marge Simpson and neighbor Ruth Powers being pursued by police while illegally driving Ruth's ex-husband's car; the episode ends with a Dragnet-style epilogue detailing the characters' fates, as narrated by original series announcer George Fenneman, then the end credits run over a graphic of a police badge while a version of The Simpsons theme done in the style of the famous "Dragnet March" plays. Also, the season-seven episode "Mother Simpson" has Homer Simpson's mother, Mona Simpson, as a fugitive from Charles Montgomery Burns, who is about to be captured after 27 years. Burns is helped by officers Joe Friday and Bill Gannon (voiced by Harry Morgan). In the season-five episode "Homer the Vigilante", the Dragnet theme plays following a Dragnet-style interaction between Homer Simpson and Principal Skinner.
- Dragnet is parodied at the end of the episode of The New Adventures of Winnie-the-Pooh titled: "Sorry, Wrong Slusher". Winnie-the-Pooh performs a closing narration as a mug shot of Christopher Robin is shown on screen, in the style of Dragnet.
- The Amazon original series The Man in the High Castle features a show in the fictional universe where Germany won the Second World War called "American Reich", shot in the style of Dragnet. The show's title crawl music is similar to Dragnet, and the title card contains a police badge with a swastika in the center. In keeping with the alternate history, the character equivalent of Friday is a straight-laced Nazi, with catchphrases including "Ein Volk, Ein Reich, Ein phone call" ("One people, one empire, one phone call.").
- In the U.S. Acres segment of Garfield and Friends season six episode "How Now, Stolen Cow?" featuring Orson Pig and Bo Sheep doing their send up of the series, including the end featuring the results of the trial.

== Home media ==
=== Original television series (1951–1959) ===
Most, if not all, episodes of this series are in the public domain, and 52 episodes were released by many DVD labels. These collections feature a variety of the same 52 episodes. These include "The Human Bomb", "The Big Actor", "The Big Mother", "The Big Cast", "The Big September Man", "The Big Phone Call", "The Big Casing", "The Big Lamp", "The Big Seventeen", "The Big .22 Caliber Rifle for Christmas", "The Big Grandma", "The Big Show", "The Big Break", "The Big Frank", "The Big Hands", "The Big Barrette", "The Big Dance", "The Big Betty", "The Big Will", "The Big Thief", "The Big Little Jesus", "The Big Trunk", "The Big Boys", "The Big Children", "The Big Winchester", "The Big Shoplift", "The Big Hit & Run Killer", "The Big Girl", "The Big Frame", "The Big False Make", "The Big Producer", "The Big Fraud", "The Big Crime", "The Big Pair", "The Big Missing", "The Big Bar", "The Big Present", "The Big New Year", "The Big Rod", "The Big Lift", "The Big Gap", "The Big Look", "The Big Glasses", "The Big Bird", "the Big Smoke", "The Big Bounce", "The Big Deal", "The Big Hat", "The Big Net", "The Big War", "The Big Oskar", and "The Big Counterfeit". Often, some are mislabeled as no onscreen titles are used.

Three collections released from Alpha Video feature four episodes each. Eclectic DVD released a collection of three episodes.

Platinum Video released seven episodes from the original series in 2002. The episodes are: "Big Crime", "Big Pair", "Big Producer", "Big Break", "Big September Man", "Big Betty", and "Big Trunk". The two-disc set includes episodes from Burke's Law; Peter Gunn; Richard Diamond, Private Detective; Mr. Wong, Detective; and Bulldog Drummond.

=== Dragnet feature film (1954) ===
This movie was released on DVD in 2009 as part of Universal Studios' "Vault Series".

The movie was released on bluray in 2020 by Kino Lorber. The transfer features a 2K scan.

=== Dragnet pilot movie (1966) ===
This movie is a bonus feature on Shout! Factory's "Dragnet 1968: Season Two" (Release Date: July 6, 2010).

=== Dragnet (1967–1970) ===
On June 7, 2005, Universal Studios released the first season on DVD in Region 1. Because sales numbers did not meet Universal's expectations, no plans were made to release the remaining three seasons.

On March 17, 2010, Shout! Factory acquired the rights to distribute the series under license from Universal. They subsequently released seasons 2–4.

DVD name	Ep #	Release date
Season 1	17	June 7, 2005; February 13, 2018 (re-release)
Season 2	28	July 6, 2010
Season 3	27	December 7, 2010
Season 4	26	April 12, 2011

=== The New Dragnet (1989) ===
No DVD releases to date of this remake that lasted two seasons.

=== L.A. Dragnet (2003) ===
Universal Studios Home Entertainment was going to release the first season of this short-lived remake on DVD on November 11, 2003, but this release was cancelled. It is not known if the set will be released.

== Legacy ==
Dragnet remains an influence on the police procedural genre.

- "Dragnet", the four-note introduction to the franchise's brass and timpani theme music (its origins date to Miklós Rózsa's score for the 1946 film version of The Killers).
- The opening narration: "Ladies and gentlemen: the story you are about to hear is true. Only the names have been changed to protect the innocent." Over time, "only" and "ladies and gentlemen" were eventually dropped. The television version used in the 1950s and 1960s series replaced "hear" with "see" and had a backdrop of Joe Friday's badge, number 714.

== General and cited sources ==
- Dunning, John. On the Air: The Encyclopedia of Old-Time Radio. Oxford University Press. 1998, ISBN 0-19-507678-8.
- Michael J. Hayde, My Name's Friday: The Unauthorized but True Story of Dragnet and the Films of Jack Webb. Cumberland House, 2001, ISBN 1-58182-190-5
- Jason Mittell, Genre and Television: From Cop Shows to Cartoons in American Culture. Routledge, 2004, ISBN 0-415-96903-4.
