= Dharma Realm Buddhist University =

Private, nonprofit Buddhist university in Ukiah, California, United States

- 法界佛教大學
- Official seal
- Other name: DRBU
- Type: Private nonprofit
- Established: 1976
- Founder: Hsuan Hua
- Parent institution: Dharma Realm Buddhist Association
- Religious affiliation: Chan Buddhism (Chinese Zen)
- Academic affiliations: Western Association of Schools and Colleges
- Chairman: Ming-Lu Huang
- President: Susan A. Rounds
- Vice-president: Douglas M. Powers
- Dean: Martin Verhoeven (Academics); Bhikshuni Heng Liang (Students)
- Location: 4951 Bodhi Way; Ukiah, CA 95482; United States; 39.1324°N 123.1613°W
- Campus: Rural
- Campus size: 700 acres (280 ha)
- Colors: Green
- Website: www.drbu.edu

Chinese name
- Simplified Chinese: 法界佛教大学
- Traditional Chinese: 法界佛教大學
Transcriptions
Standard Mandarin
- Hanyu Pinyin: Fǎjiè Fójiào Dàxué
- Wade–Giles: Fa^{3}-chieh^{4} Fo^{2}-chiao^{4} Ta^{4}-hsüeh^{2}
Yue: Cantonese
- Yale Romanization: Faatgaai Fahtgaau Daaihhohk
- Jyutping: Faat3-gaai3 Fat6-gaau3 Daai6-hok6
- Location in Northern California

Dharma Realm Buddhist University (DRBU) is an American private nonprofit university located in Ukiah, California, just over 100 miles north of San Francisco, in Mendocino County. It was established in 1976 by Venerable Master Hsuan Hua. It is situated in the monastic setting of the City of Ten Thousand Buddhas, a Mahayana Buddhist monastery. DRBU follows a unique variation of the Great Books model, incorporating texts from both East and West. The university has a longstanding partnership with the Pacific School of Religion and the Graduate Theological Union, as well as the Dharma Realm Buddhist Association.

== History ==
In 1976, Dharma Realm Buddhist University was formally established at the City of Ten Thousand Buddhas, with the very first class arriving in 1977. The first Chancellor was Venerable Master Hsuan Hua. Other founding members include Bhikshuni Heng Hsien and Professor Ron Epstein. From 1977 to 1984, DRBU operated with the authorization status given by the California Postsecondary Education Commission. In 1976, the Institute of World Religions was created by Hsuan Hua and Paul Cardinal Yu Bin. In 1984, DRBU attained Approval to Operate as a California Degree-Granting Institution pursuant to the California Education Code, Section 94310 [c] and is currently approved to operate under the California Bureau for Private Postsecondary Education (BPPE). In 1986, DRBU hosted the Conference on World Religions for the first time in California. In 1994, the Institute of World Religions moved to Berkeley Buddhist Monastery. In 1997, DRBU began its partnership with the Graduate Theological Union and Pacific School of Religion. In 2000, the Venerable Master Hua Memorial Lecture series began. In 2001, the Institute for World Religions published the inaugural issue of its academic journal, Religion East & West. In 2006, DRBU established the Berkeley campus with Reverend Heng Sure, Ph.D., as its first director. In 2011, DRBU launched the university blog, dharmas. In 2013, DRBU began its two new programs, BA in Liberal Arts and MA in Buddhist Classics, both approved by the California Bureau of Private Postsecondary Education (BPPE); from 2013 to 2015, DRBU phased out its six existing BPPE-approved degree programs.

In December, 2013, DRBU was granted Eligibility for WSCUC Candidacy and Initial Accreditation by the WASC Senior College and University Commission (WSCUC) Eligibility Review Committee for its two new programs. In June 2016, DRBU was granted Candidacy for Initial Accreditation with WSCUC. In February 2018, DRBU was granted accreditation by WSCUC.

== Academics ==
=== Liberal Education in the broad Buddhist Tradition ===
The name "Dharma Realm" is a Buddhist phrasing for the notion of the universe as part of the meaning of "university" - one that enables its member to embrace and portray an endless and vast vision that encompasses humanity and stretches throughout the universe. Hence, the name Dharma Realm Buddhist University (DRBU) expresses an Eastern rendering of the same idea: the university as a place devoted to understanding ourselves, the nature of the wider universe and its workings, and our place in it. DRBU employs a philosophy of educating while "developing inherent wisdom," a model grounded in Buddhist values and one that founder Hsuan Hua was a proponent of.

DRBU's mission is "to provide liberal education in the broad Buddhist tradition—a tradition characterized by knowledge in the arts and sciences, self-cultivation, and the pursuit of wisdom. Its pedagogical aim is thus twofold: to convey knowledge and to activate an intrinsic wisdom possessed by all individuals. Developing this inherent capacity requires an orientation toward learning that is dialogical, interactive, probing, and deeply self-reflective. Such education aims to make students free in the deepest sense and to open the opportunity to pursue the highest goals of human existence."

DRBU's goal is "to educate the whole person and nurture lifelong learners who can apply their knowledge and understanding in a creative and beneficial way."

Because DRBU shares a campus with a Buddhist monastery, students engage in academic and intellectual inquiry while living in a contemplative setting. DRBU's pedagogy is a variation on the "Great Books" model, where learning stems from close reading of primary texts and group discussion in a system of "shared inquiry", as well as integrated Contemplative Exercises both in and outside of the classroom.

=== Contemplative Practices at DRBU ===
In addition to Contemplative Exercises during classroom time, every semester, all classes and non-essential service scholarship are suspended so that whole university community can engage in a week-long Contemplative Exercise Immersion (CEI). Designed and run by DRBU faculty, the CEI is a full time retreat for students, faculty and staff held on university grounds. According to DRBU, the CEI retreat is meant as an important "laboratory" experience where "students can unplug from their ordinary routines to directly experience a variety of disciplined forms of self-reflection, centering practices, and more intuitive modes of knowing—all aimed at increasing a subtler awareness within and without: of oneself, and one’s place in the larger world."

=== Academic Programs ===
DRBU has two degree programs and a graduate certificate program: a Bachelor of Arts in Liberal Arts, a Master of Arts in Buddhist Classics and a Graduate Certificate in Buddhist Translation. The curriculum of all three programs is sequential; students travel through their respective programs as a cohort.

- The BA in Liberal Arts is a four-year program that combines classical texts from both Eastern and Western traditions, as well as courses in mathematics, natural science, and music. Students also study Classical Chinese and Sanskrit, thereby familiarizing themselves with the original languages of many of the texts they are studying.
- The MA in Buddhist Classics is a two-year program focusing on primary Buddhist texts and equipping students with skills in language and hermeneutics. For language study, students may choose either Classical Chinese or Sanskrit (or both).
- The Graduate Certificate in Buddhist Translation is an integrated two-semester program that combines translation of Buddhist texts from Chinese into English with study, spiritual practice, and service in a contemplative setting.

=== Reading List (BA in Liberal Arts, by strand) ===
The BA program integrated curriculum that weaves together ten distinct strands: Buddhist Classics, Western Classics, Indian Classics, Chinese Classics, Language, Mathematics, Natural Science, Rhetoric and Writing, Music, and Capstone.

==== Buddhist Classics ====
- Dīgha Nikāya,
- Majjhima Nikāya,
- Saṃyutta Nikāya,
- Aṅguttara Nikāya,
- Khuddaka Nikāya,
- Vimalakīrti Sūtra,
- Heart Sūtra,
- Vajra Sūtra,
- Lotus Sūtra,
- The Sūtra in Forty-two Sections,
- Śūraṅgama Sūtra,
- Huineng, Sixth Patriarch Sūtra,
- Longer Sukhāvatīvyūha Sūtra,
- Mahāparinirvāṇa Sūtra,
- Avataṃsaka Sūtra
- Visuddhimagga,
- Aśvaghoṣa, Awakening of Faith in the Mahāyāna,
- Xingan, Essay on the Resolve for Bodhi,
- Vasubandhu, Shastra on the Door to Understanding a Hundred Dharmas
- Nāgārjuna, Bodhisaṃbhāra Śāstra,
- Letter to a Friend, Biographies of great Buddhist monastic practitioners

==== Western Classics ====
- Epic of Gilgamesh;
- Homer, Iliad;
- Sophocles, Antigone;
- Plato, Timaeus;
- Aristotle, Nicomachean Ethics;
- Virgil, Aeneid;
- New Testament;
- Augustine, Confessions;
- Dante, Divine Comedy;
- Shakespeare, King Lear,
- Descartes, Meditations;
- Hume, Treatise of Human Nature;
- Spenser, Faerie Queen;
- Austen, Sense and Sensibility,
- Emerson, Self-Reliance,
- Thoreau, Civil Disobedience,
- Eliot, Middlemarch,
- The Complete Poems of Emily Dickinson,
- Smith, Wealth of Nations,
- Freud, Civilization and Its Discontents,
- Heidegger, Being and Time;
- Hegel, Phenomenology of the Spirit;
- Dostoevsky, The Brothers Karamazov;
- Goethe, Faust;
- Tocqueville, Democracy in America

==== Chinese Classics ====
- Confucius, Analects
- Mozi
- Mencius
- Daodejing
- Zhuangzi, Inner Chapters
- Xunzi
- Han Feizi
- Shijing (Odes)
- Shujing (Documents)
- Yijing (Changes)
- Xiaojing (Classic on Family Reverence)
- Huainanzi
- Sima Qian, Shiji (Records of the Grand Historian)
- Tang Poetry
- Daxue (Great Learning)
- Zhongyong (Doctrine of the Mean)
- Zhang Zai, Western Inscription
- Zhuxi
- Wang Yangming, Instructions for Practical Living
- Luo Guanzhong, Sanguo Yanyi (Romance of the Three Kingdoms)

==== Indian Classics ====
- Vedas
- Upadeśasāhasrī by Śrī Śaṅkarācārya
- Swami Vivekananda
- Yogasūtra by Patañjali
- The Mahābhārata and Bhagavadgītā
- The Rāmāyaṇa by Vālmīki
- Rāma’s Last Act by Bhavabhūti
- The Recognition of Śakuntalā by Kālidāsa
- Handsome Nanda by Aśvaghoṣa
- Ācārāṅgasūtra
- Devī Māhātmya
- Paramārthasāra by Abhinavagupta
- The Enclosed Garden of the Truth by Hakim Sanai
- Kabir
- Hazrat Inayat Khan

==== Mathematics ====
- Euclid, Element
- Apollonius of Perga, Conics
- Descartes, Geometry
- Pascal, Generation of Conic Sections
- Viète, Introduction to the Analytical Art
- Newton, Principia Mathematica
- Dedekind, Selected writings on the Theory of Numbers
- Selected writings from Taylor, Euler, and Leibniz

==== Natural Science ====
- Aristotle, Parts of Animals, Physics
- Archimedes, On the Equilibrium of Planes, On Floating Bodies
- Pascal, On the Equilibrium of Liquids, On the Weight of the Mass of the Air
- Antoine Lavoisier, Elements of Chemistry
- Mendel, Experiments in Plant Hybridization
- Darwin, The Origin of Species
- Galileo, Two New Sciences
- Newton, Opticks, Philosophy of Nature
- Descartes, Principles of Philosophy
- Albert Einstein, Relativity

==== Rhetoric and Writing ====
- Crider, The Office of Assertion: An Art of Rhetoric for the Academic Essay
- Plato, Phaedrus
- Essays by George Orwell
- Bizzell and Herzberg, The Rhetorical Tradition: Readings from Classical Times to the Present
- Selections of poetry and prose

==== Embodied Learning ====
- Culinary Arts Class
- Tai Chi Class
- Pottery Class
- Intro. Watercoloring Class
- Intro. Piano Class
- Yoga Class

=== Reading List (MA in Buddhist Classics, by strand) ===
The MA graduate program consists of courses from four distinct strands: Buddhist Classics, Comparative Hermeneutics, Buddhist Hermeneutics, and Language.

==== Buddhist Classics ====
- Sūtra: The Dharma Jewel Platform Sutra of the Sixth Patriarch，Explication of Underlying Meaning, Śūraṅgama Sūtra, Lotus Sūtra, Avataṃsaka Sūtra
- Sutta: Majjhima Nikāya, Saṃyutta Nikāya, Aṅguttara Nikāya, Dīgha Nikāya
- Śāstra: Ācariya Anuruddha's Abhidhammattha Sangaha, Nāmarūpapariccheda (Manual of Defining Mind & Matter), Vīryaśrīdatta’s Arthaviniścayasūtranibandhana, Vasubandhu’s Abhidharmakośabhāṣya, Yogācārabhūmi，Vasubandhu’s Śāstra on the Door to Understanding the One Hundred Dharmas, commentaries on Vasubandhu’s Triṃśikā by Sthiramati and Xuan Zhuang

==== Comparative Hermeneutics ====
- selected work by Plato, René Descartes, David Hume, Immanual Kant, G.W.H. Hegel, Karl Marx, Arthur Schopenhauer, Friedrich Nietzsche, William James, Sigmund Freud, Carl Jung, Edmund Husserl, Martin Heidegger, Ludwig Wittgenstein, Jean-Paul Sartre, Jacques Lacan, Pierre Hadot, Jean-François Lyotard, Gilles Deleuze, Luce Irigaray, Slavoj Zizek, Judith Butler.

==== Buddhist Hermeneutics ====
- Sūtra: Mahāpadesa, Catuḥpratisaraṇasūtra, Cullavagga, Diamond Sūtra, Heart Sūtra,
- The Ten Doors of the Avataṃsaka Prologue by Qing Liang
- Biographical and autobiographical works include: Therīgāthā (Verses and Poems of Early Buddhist Nuns); The Dhamma Teaching of Acariya Maha Boowa; The Venerable Phra Acharn Mun Bhuridatta Thera; The Autobiography of Phra Ajaan Lee; The Autobiography of Ch’an Master Han Shan; Empty Cloud: The Autobiography of the Chinese Zen Master by Xuyun; The Ten Foot Square Hut (Hōjōki) by Kamo no Chōmei; and poetry selections.

== Affiliated organizations ==
=== Buddhist Text Translation Society ===
DRBU is also in close collaboration with the Buddhist Text Translation Society (BTTS), and faculty and students have published books on spirituality and world religions with the BTTS. Students can also publish works in Vajra Bodhi Sea, the monthly journal of orthodox Buddhism published continuously since 1970.

=== Institute for World Religions ===
The Institute for World Religions (now located on the Berkeley campus) was established with the goal that harmony among the world's religions is an indispensable prerequisite for a just and peaceful world, and to affirm humanity's common bonds and rise above narrow sectarian differences. Catholic Cardinal Yu Bin was the first director in 1976. It has one of the longest Buddhist Christian interfaith dialogues in the country, with the Zen-Chan Buddhist Catholic Dialogue occurring annually since 2002.

==== Religion East & West ====
Religion East & West is the academic journal of the Institute for World Religions.

== Campus ==
=== City of Ten Thousand Buddhas ===
At the City of Ten Thousand Buddhas (CTTB), DRBU shares a campus with the monastic community of monks and nuns, resident volunteers, and the Instilling Goodness Elementary School and Developing Virtue Secondary School. The campus encompasses over 70 buildings on more than 700 acres.

==== Facilities ====
At CTTB, students take their meals with the rest of the community in the Five Contemplations Dining Hall (built in 1982). In accordance with the principle of compassion toward all beings, all meals served on campus are vegetarian. In addition, the Jyun Kang Vegetarian Restaurant is on the campus.

A two-story library holds numerous Buddhist canons and commentaries in multiple languages, as well as audio-visual materials and computer resources. The Hall of Ten Thousand Buddhas is the spiritual hub of CTTB, with ceremonies and meditation taking place daily between 4:00 am and 9:30 pm, as well as several retreats throughout the year.

DRBU is currently renovating one of the buildings on campus to be the future DRBU building.

=== Sudhana Center ===
DRBU acquired the Sudhana Center in the summer of 2015. It is a 5-acre university campus for events and long-term classes, located in west Ukiah.

== Student life ==
=== Student organizations ===
According to DRBU's website "DRBU Student Activities offers diverse opportunities for learning, encourages student leadership and community engagement, and promotes healthy, balanced and active lifestyles among the student body."

Some student clubs include:

- Student Magazine- Mirror Flower Water Moon is a print and digital magazine published two times a year. Each issue has a theme and invites submissions of visual art, academic work, personal reflections, fiction, poetry, and more. The magazine is led and edited by a team of BA and MA students.
- Three Treasures Tea Club
- Pali Club
- Kalyāṇa Tea Club
- Architecture and Design Club
- Yoga Club (Instructional)
- Tai-chi Club (Instructional)
- Pottery Club (Instructional)
