= California State Route 222 =

Highway in California

State Route 222
- Talmage Road
- SR 222 highlighted in red

Route information
- Maintained by Caltrans
- Length: 1.626 mi (2.617 km)

Major junctions
- West end: US 101 in Ukiah
- East end: East Side Road, Sanford Ranch Road and Bodhi Way in Talmage

Location
- Country: United States
- State: California
- County: Mendocino

Highway system
- State highways in California; Interstate; US; State; Scenic; History; Pre‑1964; Unconstructed; Deleted; Freeways
← SR 221	→ SR 223

State Route 222 (SR 222), named Talmage Road along its entire length, is an unsigned state highway in the U.S. state of California. It was originally constructed as a short spur route of U.S. Route 101 in Mendocino County to what was the Mendocino State Hospital in Talmage. The road has remained a state highway after the hospital closed down and the City of Ten Thousand Buddhas monastery was established on the former site in 1976. The SR 222 designation legislatively ends at its intersection with East Side Road, where the road continues as Bodhi Way into the monastery complex.

== Route description ==
Route 222 is defined in section 522 of the California Streets and Highways Code, and that the highway is "from Route 101 near Ukiah easterly to East Side Road in Talmage".

Built originally to provide access to the long-defunct Mendocino State Hospital, SR 222 is an unsigned spur route off of U.S. Route 101 at Ukiah, ending east at the intersection with East Side Road in Talmage, outside the City of Ten Thousand Buddhas monastery and university (which is located on the grounds of the former Mendocino State Hospital). West of U.S. Route 101, Talmage Road continues as a city street under Ukiah's control.

SR 222 is not part of the National Highway System, a network of highways that are considered essential to the country's economy, defense, and mobility by the Federal Highway Administration.

== Major intersections ==
Except where prefixed with a letter, postmiles were measured on the road as it was in 1964, based on the alignment that existed at the time, and do not necessarily reflect current mileage. Postmile prefixes include: R reflecting a realignment in the route since then, M indicating a second realignment, L referring to an overlap due to a correction or change, and T indicating postmiles classified as temporary. Segments that remain unconstructed or have been relinquished to local control may be omitted. The entire route is in Mendocino County.

Location	Postmile	Destinations	Notes
Ukiah	R0.00	Talmage Road	Continuation beyond US 101
Ukiah	R0.00	US 101 (Redwood Highway) – Eureka, Santa Rosa	Interchange; west end of SR 222; US 101 exit 548A
Talmage	2.15	East Side Road, Sanford Ranch Road	East end of SR 222
Talmage	2.15	Bodhi Way – City of Ten Thousand Buddhas	Continuation beyond East Side Road and Sanford Ranch Road; former entrance to Mendocino State Hospital
1.000 mi = 1.609 km; 1.000 km = 0.621 mi
