= DVBS =

DVBS may refer to:

- DVB-S (Digital Video Broadcasting — Satellite), the original DVB standard for satellite television
- Developing Virtue Secondary School, a Buddhist school in Talmage, California, US
