= Dharma Realm Buddhist Association =

The DRBA logo

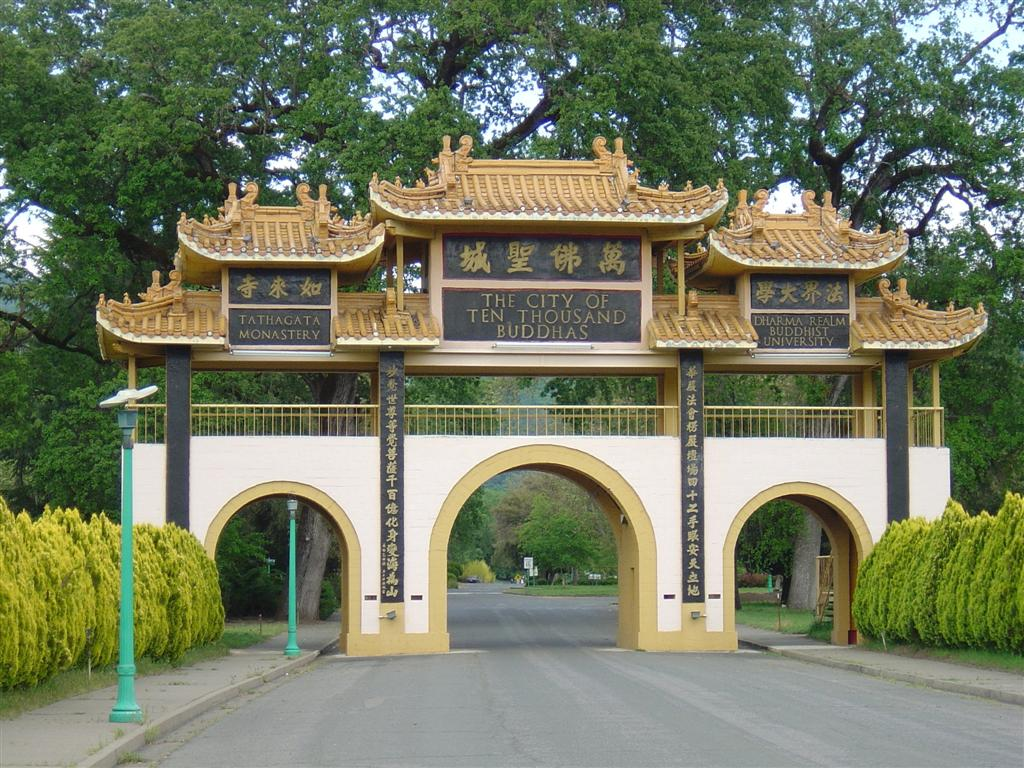
The mountain gate to the City of Ten Thousand Buddhas, the headquarters of DRBA.

The Dharma Realm Buddhist Association (shortened to DRBA, Chinese: 法界佛教總會, PY: Fajie Fojiao Zonghui, formerly known as the Sino-American Buddhist Association) is an international, non-profit Buddhist organization founded by the Venerable Master Hsuan Hua in 1959 to bring the orthodox teachings of the Buddha to the entire world. DRBA has branch monasteries in many countries and cities, including San Francisco, Los Angeles, Seattle, and Vancouver, as well as in Malaysia, Taiwan, Hong Kong, and Australia.

== History ==
The Sino-American Buddhist Association was founded in San Francisco, California in 1959. A small temple, the Buddhist Lecture Hall was started. The Venerable Master Hsuan Hua came over from Hong Kong in 1962 by plane, stopping over at Japan and Hawaii before arriving at San Francisco.

From 1962 to 1968 the Venerable Master lectured on the Lotus Sutra, the Diamond Sutra, and the Amitabha Sutra among many other Buddhist sutras and texts. Many of his Dharma talks and line-by-line explanations of sacred Buddhist texts have been published in book form by the Buddhist Text Translation Society, both in the original Chinese and in English translation.

In June 1968 he began a 96-day intensive Study and Practice Summer Session for students and faculty from the University of Washington in Seattle. After the session had concluded, many of the participants remained in San Francisco to continue their studies with the Venerable Master. In that year five Americans (three Bhikshus, two Bhikshunis) were ordained, marking the beginning of the Sangha in the United States.

In 1970 Gold Mountain Monastery, one of the first Chinese Buddhist temples in the United States was founded in San Francisco, and a Hundred Day Chan Session was begun. Vajra Bodhi Sea, a monthly journal of DRBA about Buddhist topics and teachings, was also founded in 1970.

In 1972 the first Threefold Ordination Ceremony for the transmission of the complete precepts was held at Gold Mountain Monastery.

In 1973 the Institute for the Translation of Buddhist Texts and Instilling Goodness Elementary School were founded in San Francisco. In the same year, Bhikshus Heng Ju and Heng Yo began a Three Steps One Bow pilgrimage from San Francisco to Seattle to pray for world peace - a hard journey over 1,000 miles. This was the first such pilgrimage in the history of American Buddhism.

The site of the City of Ten Thousand Buddhas was purchased in 1974, and in November of that year the Venerable Master Hsuan Hua led a delegation to propagate the Dharma in Hong Kong, India, Singapore, Vietnam, Taiwan and other places. The delegation lasted for three months, ending on January 12, 1975.

Gold Wheel Monastery was founded in Los Angeles in 1975.

In 1976 the City of Ten Thousand Buddhas completed the second Threefold Ordination Ceremony. Developing Virtue Secondary Schools and Dharma Realm Buddhist University were also founded. The next year Dharma Masters Heng Sure and Heng Chau (now Martin Verhoeven) began a second Three Steps, One Bow pilgrimage from Gold Wheel Monastery to the City of Ten Thousand Buddhas.

== Branch Monasteries ==
Note that this is only a partial list of all branch monasteries of DRBA.

=== United States ===
- The City of Ten Thousand Buddhas 萬佛聖城 - Talmage, CA
- The City of the Dharma Realm 法界聖城 - West Sacramento, CA
- Gold Mountain Monastery 金山聖寺 - San Francisco, CA
- Institute for World Religions & Berkeley Buddhist Monastery 法界宗教研究院 - Berkeley, CA
- The International Translation Institute 國際譯經學院 - Burlingame, CA
- Gold Wheel Monastery 金輪聖寺 - Los Angeles, CA
- Long Beach Monastery 長提聖寺 - Long Beach, CA
- Blessings, Prosperity & Longevity Monastery 福祿壽聖寺 - Long Beach, CA
- Gold Sage Monastery 金聖寺 - San Jose, CA
- Gold Summit Monastery 金峰聖寺 - Seattle, WA
- Avatamsaka Vihara 華嚴精舍 - Bethesda, MD

=== Canada ===
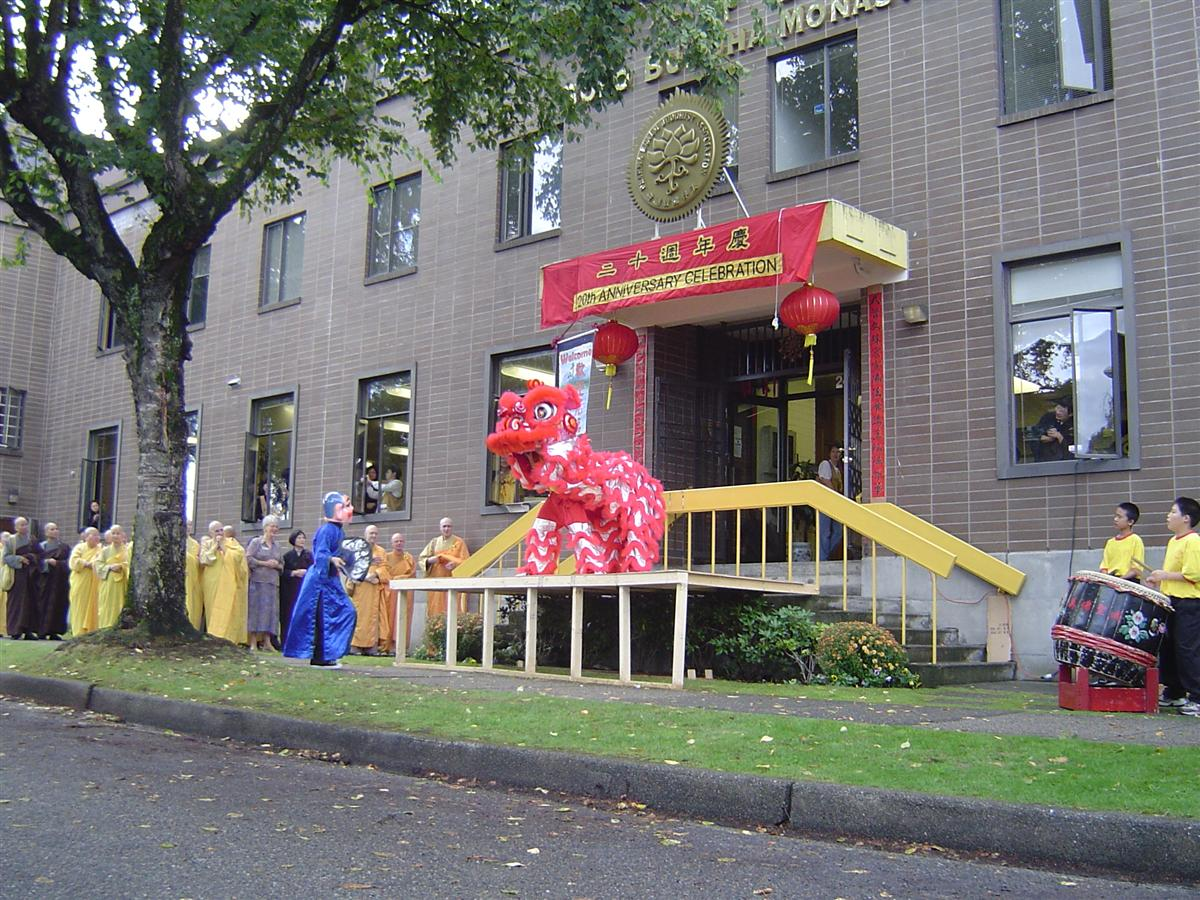
Gold Buddha Monastery in Vancouver.

- Avatamsaka Monastery 華嚴聖寺 - Calgary, Alberta, Canada
- Gold Buddha Monastery 金佛聖寺 - Vancouver, British Columbia, Canada

=== Malaysia ===
- Dharma Realm Guan Yin Sagely Monastery 法界觀音聖寺 - Kuala Lumpur, Malaysia
- Prajna Guan Yin Sagely Monastery 般若觀音聖寺 - Kuala Lumpur, Malaysia
- Lotus Vihara 蓮華精舍 - Selangor, Malaysia
- Fa Yuan Sageley Monastery 法緣聖寺 - Seri Kembangan, Selangor, Malaysia
- Malaysia Dharma Realm Buddhist Association - Penang Branch 馬來西亞法界佛教總會檳城分會- Penang, Malaysia

=== Hong Kong ===
- Cixing Monastery 慈興寺
- Buddhist Lecture Hall 佛教講堂

=== Taiwan ===
- Dharma Realm Buddhist Books Distribution Society 法界佛教印經會 - Taipei, Taiwan
- Amitabha Monastery 彌陀聖寺 - Hualien, Taiwan
- Dharma Realm Monastery 法界聖寺 - Liouguei, Kaohsiung, Taiwan

=== Australia ===
- Gold Coast Dharma Realm 金岸法界 - Gold Coast, Australia

== See also ==
- Hsuan Hua
- Buddhism in America
- Timeline of Zen Buddhism in the United States
