= DRBA =

DRBA may refer to:

- Dharma Realm Buddhist Association, an international Buddhist organization based in the United States
- Delaware River and Bay Authority, a bi-state government agency operating bridges and airports in Delaware and New Jersey
- Dopamine antagonist (or Dopamine Receptor Blocking Agent), a type of drug which blocks dopamine receptors by receptor antagonism
