= Heng Sure =

American Buddhist monk (born 1949)

Heng Sure 恆實
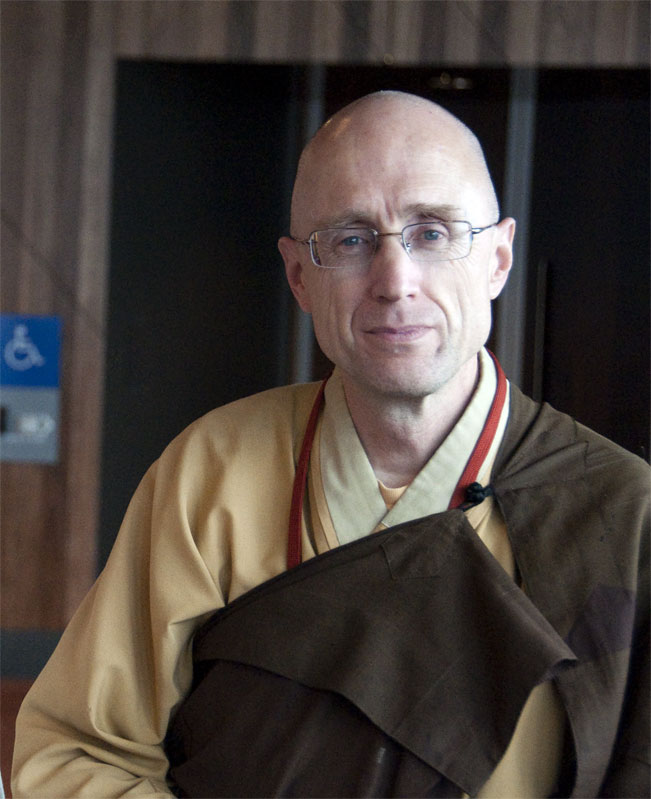
- Title: Venerable

Personal life
- Born: Christopher Clowery; October 31, 1949 (age 76) Toledo, Ohio, United States

Religious life
- Religion: Buddhism
- School: Guiyang Chan school

Senior posting
- Teacher: Hsuan Hua

Heng Sure (恆實法師, Pinyin: Héng Shí, birth name Christopher R. Clowery; born October 31, 1949) is an American Chan Buddhist monk and a senior disciple of Venerable Hsuan Hua. He serves as the managing director of Berkeley Buddhist monastery, the president of the board of directors of Dharma Realm Buddhist Association and a member of the board of trustees at Dharma Realm Buddhist University. He has previously taught at the Graduate Theological Union, Bond University, and Dharma Realm Buddhist University as a professor. He has released several albums of Buddhist folk music including "Paramita: American Buddhist Folk Songs" (2008). Heng Sure has also been active in interfaith organizations, serving as a long-time trustee for the Interfaith Center at the Presidio and United Religions Initiative and regularly presenting at Parliament of the World’s Religions.

He is probably best known for a two-years and six-months three steps, one bow pilgrimage from 1977 to 1979. Heng Sure and his companion Heng Chau (Martin Verhoeven), bowed from South Pasadena to Ukiah, California, a distance of 800 miles, wishing for world peace.

Born in Toledo, Ohio, Ven. Heng Sure grew up with an early exposure to Chinese language and culture, influenced by his high school studies and his sister's work with the U.S. Information Agency. He attended DeVilbiss High School and pursued higher education at Oakland University in Rochester, Michigan, before attending the University of California at Berkeley, where he studied from 1971 to 1976. During this time, he deepened his interest in Oriental languages and earned a master's degree in the field in 1976.

That same year, Heng Sure met Venerable Master Hsuan Hua, who would later ordain him at the City of Ten Thousand Buddhas and received the Dharma name "Heng Sure," meaning "Constantly Real." In 2003, he furthered his academic journey by earning a PhD in Religion from the Graduate Theological Union in Berkeley.

In October 2024, Rev. Heng Sure participated in the Sixth World Buddhist Forum held in Ningbo, Zhejiang Province, China, where he emphasized gratitude and interconnectedness, reflecting on Buddhism's shared spiritual heritage.

== Three Step One Bow Pilgrimage ==
In 1977, Reverend Heng Sure and his companion, Heng Chau (formerly Marty Verhoeven), began the Three Steps, One Bow pilgrimage from South Pasadena to Ukiah, California. This journey, dedicated to world peace, involved taking three steps followed by a full prostration to the ground, covering approximately one mile per day and lasting two years and nine months. Heng Sure observed a vow of silence throughout the pilgrimage, relying on the kindness of strangers for sustenance and sleeping in their station wagon to remain outdoors.

The pilgrimage was inspired by their teacher, Hsuan Hua, who instructed them to transform their inner greed, anger, and delusions to bring peace to the world starting with their minds. Their experiences, challenges, and reflections were later compiled in the book Highway Dharma Letters: Two Buddhist Pilgrims Write to Their Teacher, documenting their spiritual journey and insights.
