= Mendocino State Hospital =

Former hospital in Ukiah, California (1889–1972)

- California Department of State Hospitals
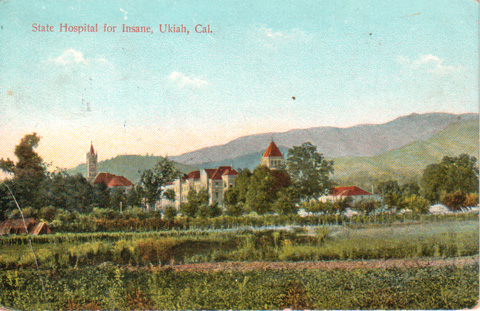

Geography
- Location: Talmage, California, United States
- Coordinates: 39.134°N 123.160°W

Organization
- Type: Specialist

Services
- Speciality: Psychiatry

History
- Former names: Mendocino State Asylum for the Insane, Mendocino Asylum
- Opened: July 1893
- Closed: 1972

Links
- Lists: Hospitals in California

Mendocino State Hospital, formally known as Mendocino State Asylum for the Insane, was a psychiatric hospital located in Talmage near Ukiah, California. It was established in 1889 and in operation from July 1893 to 1972. The hospital programs included the rehabilitation of the criminally insane, alcoholic and drug abuse rehabilitation, a psychiatric residency program, industrial therapy, and others. The property now is part of the City of Ten Thousand Buddhas community.

== History ==
The hospital was established in 1889 and opened in July 1893, and the first superintendent was Dr. Edward Warren King. By June 1900, the Ukiah district attorney Hon. T. L. Carothers filed charges against Dr. Edward Warren King, for reasons including, "incompetency, lack of medical skill, high-handed and dictatorial methods, lack of ability to command respect of his subordinates" and other charges.

This hospital was the destination for inmates charged with crimes but found not guilty by reason of insanity. Its earliest patients, all male, were transferred from other state mental institutions at Stockton State Hospital and Napa State Hospital. The name of the hospital was changed in 1893 to the Mendocino Asylum. Female patients were accepted beginning in 1894. Two additional wards were built in 1910 and 1918, respectively and a major renovation and expansion of the facility took place between 1925 and 1933. The original main, Kirkbride plan building, was completed in 1893 and was razed in 1952.

By 1932, the hospital had over 1,900 patients and 300 employees and by 1935, the figure had risen to over 2,600 patients. The hospital population hit a high in 1955, at over 3,000 patients and 700 employees. Increasing discharges and transfer of the criminally insane to the Atascadero State Hospital eased the overcrowding. By 1966, population was back under 1,800 patients.

In 1920, Dr. Martha G. Thorwick was affiliated with this hospital. This hospital was one of the many state asylums that had sterilization centers.

Roughly 1,600 patients died at the Mendocino State Hospital with 1,200 were cremated, and 400 people were buried in a mass grave at the Ukiah Cemetery (after the graves were relocated).

In 1972, the hospital was closed.

== Notable patients ==
- John Aasen, actor
- Herbert Mullin, serial killer
- Kalla Pasha, actor, convicted of assault due to insanity in 1932.
- Yuri Schwebler, conceptual artist, he spent two month here in 1970
- Frances Simpson Stevens, painter, admitted in 1961
- William Erwin Walker, criminal, condemned murderer
Mendocino State Hospital

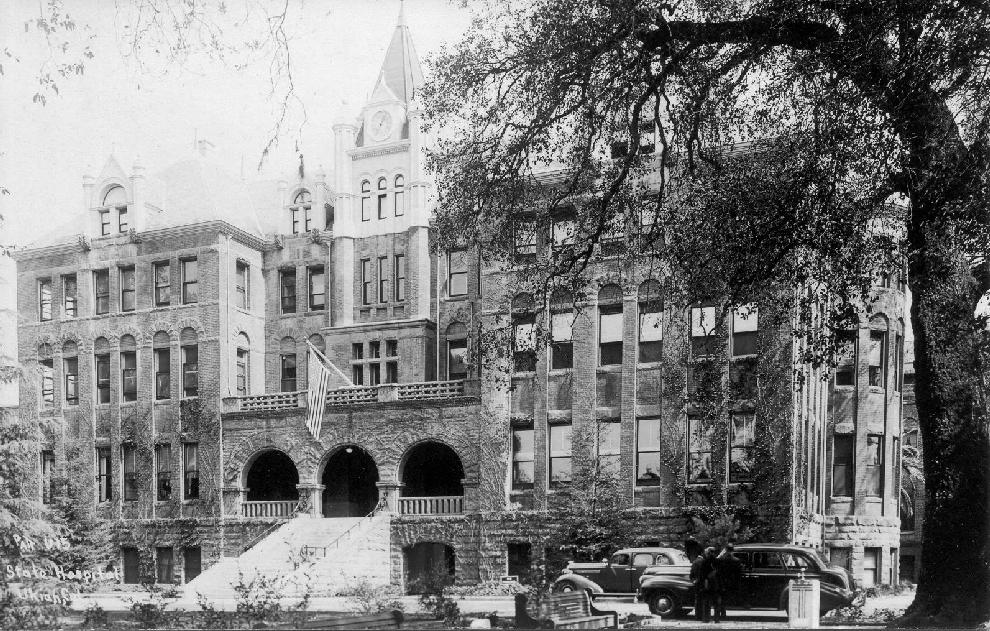
Mendocino State Hospital (c. 1910)

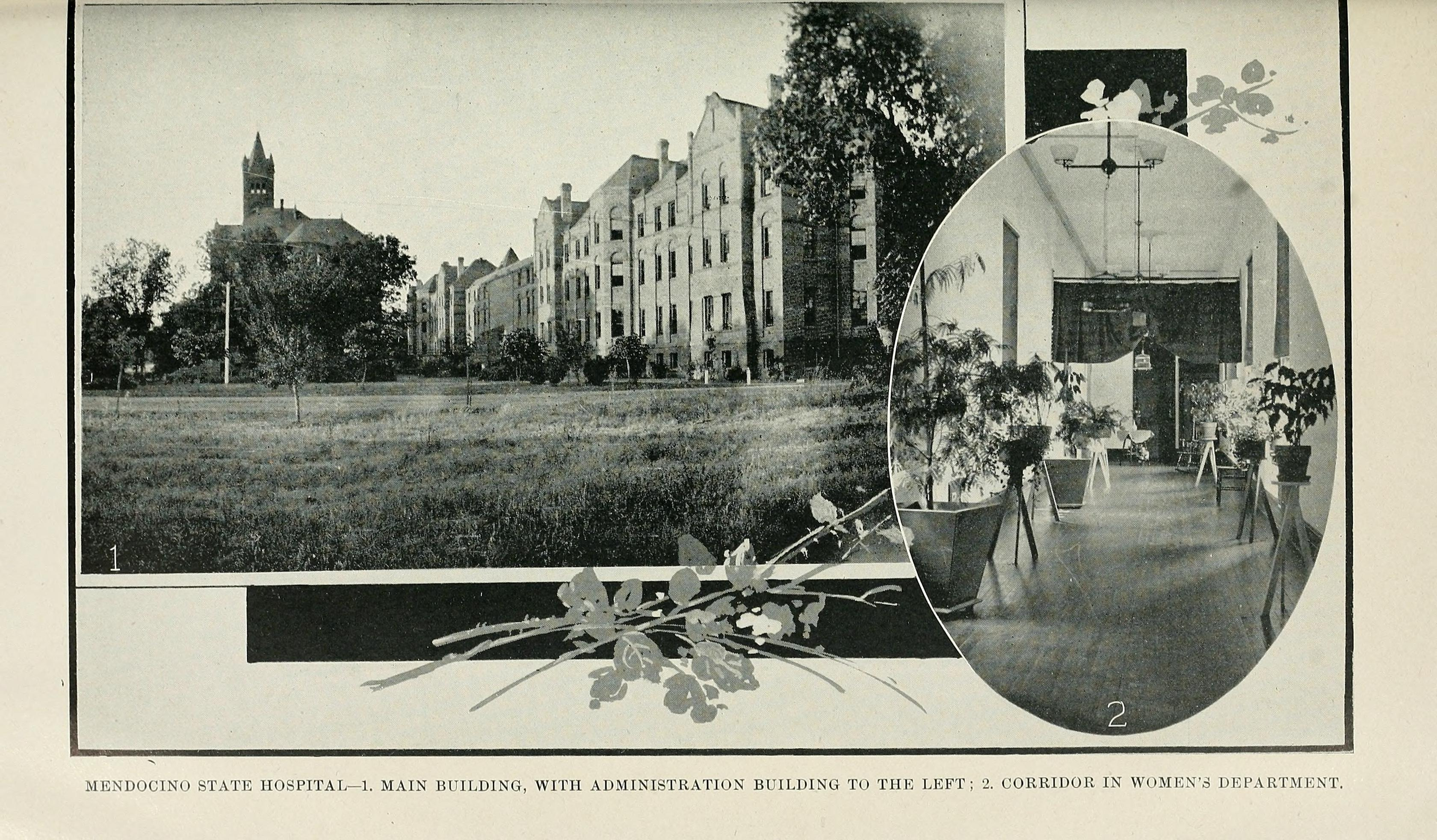
Mendocino State Hospital (1903)

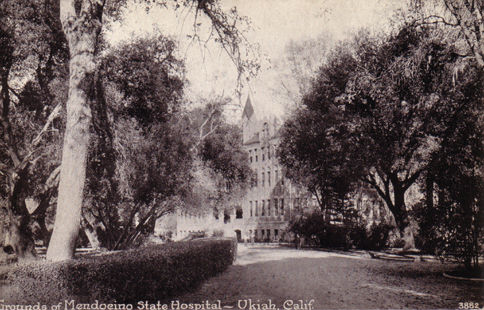
Mendocino State Hospital (c. 1910)

== See also ==
- California State Route 222
- Eugenics in California
- List of hospitals in California
