= Hermetic =

Hermetic or related forms may refer to:

- of or relating to the ancient Greek Olympian god Hermes
- of or relating to Hermes Trismegistus, a legendary Hellenistic figure based on the Greek god Hermes and the Egyptian god Thoth
  - Hermetica, philosophical and religious texts attributed to Hermes Trismegistus
  - Hermeticism, a philosophical and religious tradition based on the teachings attributed to Hermes Trismegistus
  - Hermetic Qabalah, a Western esoteric tradition involving mysticism and the occult
- Hermeticism (poetry), a form of obscure and difficult poetry
- Hermetic seal, an airtight seal
- Hermetic Press, an American publishing company
- Hermética, an Argentine thrash metal band
  - Hermética (album), their 1989 debut album
- Hermeticum (album), a 1998 album by Moonspell
- Hermetica, a video game by Home Data that later became Yoshi's Cookie

== See also ==
- Hermeneutics (disambiguation)
- Hermes (disambiguation)
