= Berkeley Buddhist Monastery =

Chan Buddhist monastery in Berkeley, California

- Location in Berkeley

Religion
- Affiliation: Chan Buddhism
- Ecclesiastical or organisational status: Monastery
- Leadership: Heng Sure
- Status: Active

Location
- Location: 2304 McKinley Avenue Berkeley, California
- Country: United States
- Coordinates: 37°52′00″N 122°16′26″W

Architecture
- Established: 1994

Website
- www.berkeleymonastery.org

The Berkeley Buddhist Monastery is a Chan Buddhist monastery in Berkeley, California affiliated with the City of Ten Thousand Buddhas and led by Heng Sure. It is the site of the Institute for World Religions, founded by Hsuan Hua.

== Berkeley Church of the Nazarene ==
The Berkeley Buddhist Monastery is currently located on the site of the Berkeley Church of the Nazarene. On January 7, 1897 Dr. Phineas F. Bresee, the founder the of the Nazarene church, held religious services in Berkeley with Rev. Ernest Alexander (E.A.) Girvin who would later serve as the church's first pastor. Soon afterwards the church was constructed, many of its initial worshipers were discontented members of the Trinity Methodist Church. The Church of the Nazarene operated on the corner of McKinley Avenue and Bancroft Way until it was purchased and repurposed as a monastery in 1994.

== The Monastery Today ==
The monastery holds public lectures, meditation sessions, meditation classes, and daily ceremonies, in English and Chinese, and occasionally in Vietnamese. The abbot, Heng Sure, is a supporter of vegetarianism and of the use of the English language and Western musical styles in Buddhist liturgy.
