= Maurice Krishaber =

French-Hungarian otorhinolaryngologist

- Born: Krishaber Mór; 3 April 1836; Feketehegy, Vojvodina, (Austrian Empire, now Serbia)
- Died: 10 April 1883 (aged 47); Mulhouse, France
- Resting place: Central cemetery Mulhouse, France; 47°45′50″N 7°20′24″E,
- Citizenship: Hungarian
- Education: Physician
- Alma mater: University of Paris
- Known for: Krishaber's disease, Krishaber's cannula
- Spouse: Berthe-Elise Kullmann
- Awards: Montyon Prize (1882)
- Scientific career
- Fields: Otorhinolaryngology
- Thesis: Considérations sur l'historique et le développement de l'encéphale (1864)

Maurice Krishaber, born Krishaber Mór in Feketehegy in Vojvodina (Hungary, now Serbia) on 3 April 1836 and died in Mulhouse (France) on 10 April 1883, was a naturalised French Hungarian otorhinolaryngologist.

== Biography ==
Born into a Hungarian Jewish family, Mór Krishaber was the son of Leonore and Guillaume Krishaber. He studied medicine at the University of Vienna and the University of Prague and completed his studies in Paris in 1859 where he defended a thesis on 31 August 1864, entitled: Considérations sur l'historique et le développement de l'encéphale (Considerations on the history and development of the encephalon).

On 9 April 1872 he was naturalised as a French citizen. On 10 June 1875 he married Berthe-Elise Kullmann (1835–1883), daughter of Anna Kitz and Pierre Kullmann (a Swiss, trader in Mulhouse), widow of Jean-Charles Baumgartner, also a trader.

He died on 10 April 1883, at the age of 47, just over a fortnight after his wife, of a rheumatic fever aggravated by double pneumonia.

He is buried in the central cemetery of Mulhouse and above his grave, a plaque with a quotation in Hungarian has been affixed: "May the peace of the dreams of the dead never be disturbed, may their graves be protected from storms for centuries!"

== Professional life ==
He became an active member of the German Medical Society in Paris on 11 May 1865. His publications, which appeared in Paris, were clearly oriented towards the ENT sphere, which he practised. He published in the Dictionary of Medical Sciences: "Diseases of the larynx" in 1868, "Diseases of singers" in 1873; and numerous writings on laryngeal tumours, tracheotomy and thyrotomy: Rhinoscopy (1875), Laryngopathology during the early stages of syphilis (1876), Cerebro-cardiac neuropathy (1873), Laryngeal cancer (1880), etc.

He perfected the tracheotomy cannula that bears his name.

He gave his name to Krishaber's disease, characterised by a combination of tachycardia, vertigo and insomnia also known as cerebro-cardiac neuropathy and classified by Freud as an "obsessive neurosis".

Maurice Krishaber, "under the category Cerebro-Cardiac Neuropathy (Névropathie Cérébro-Cardiaque) reported 38 patients showing a mixture of anxiety, fatigue and depression. Over one-third of these patients complained of baffing and unpleasant mental experiences, consisting of the loss of a feeling of reality. Krishaber suggested that these phenomena resulted from a sensory dysfunction." He proposed depersonalization was the result of pathological changes to the body's sensory modalities which lead to experiences of "self-strangeness" and the description of one patient who "feels that he is no longer himself".

In 1874, Émile Isambert, son of François-André Isambert, opened the first laryngology clinic at Lariboisière Hospital and at his death in 1876, he was succeeded by Maurice Raynaud then by Adrien Proust, the writer's father, who was especially interested in hygiene and the fight against cholera, the laryngology room being directed by his assistant Krishaber.

In 1875, together with Jules Ladreit de La Charrière and Émile Isambert, he founded theAnnales des maladies de l'oreille et du larynx (Otoscopie, laryngoscopie, rhinoscopie).

He was made a Knight of the Legion of Honour by decree of 30 July 1878 and was awarded the Montyon Prize for Medicine and Surgery in 1882.

Eight days before his death, he received a prize of 20,000 francs from the French Academy of Sciences for outstanding scientific discoveries.

== Works ==
- Dans le Dictionnaire des Sciences médicales :
  - Maladies du larynx (1868)
  - Maladies des chanteurs (1873)
- Rhinoscopie (1875)
- Laryngopathologie pendant les premières phases de la syphilis (1876)
- De la névropathie cérébro-cardiaque (1873)
- Le cancer du larynx (1880)

== Distinctions ==
Chevalier of the Legion of Honour by decree dated 30 July 1878.
