= Semidocumentary =

Form of storytelling

A semidocumentary is a form of book, film, or television program presenting a fictional story that incorporates many factual details or actual events, or which is presented in a manner similar to a documentary.

== Characteristics ==
Stylistically, it has certain similarities to Italian Neorealism, such as the use of location shooting and employing non-actors in secondary roles. However, the viewer is not intended to mistake a semidocumentary for a real documentary; the fictional elements are too prominent.

== Background ==
One of the first films of this kind was Henry Hathaway's The House on 92nd Street (1945).

In the late 1940s, semidocumentary films were often associated with film noir thrillers, sharing a commitment to on-location shooting, gritty realism, and understated performances.

== Decline ==
In the 1960s and 1970s, the semidocumentary style declined in feature films. The standard documentary had blurred the difference between itself and fiction so much that there was viewer confusion regarding what they were seeing.

== Notable semidocumentary examples ==
- The House on 92nd Street (1945)
- The Killers (1946)
- 13 Rue Madeleine (1946)
- T-Men (1947)
- Boomerang (1947)
- Brute Force (1947)
- Kiss of Death (1947)
- The Naked City (1948)
- Call Northside 777 (1948)
- Canon City (1948)
- He Walked by Night (1948)
- The Street with No Name (1948)
- Bodyguard (1948)
- The Asphalt Jungle (1950)
- Armored Car Robbery (1950)
- Mystery Street (1950)
- Night and the City (1950)
- Highway 301 (1950)
- Panic in the Streets (1950)
- Side Street (1950)
- The Racket (1951)
- On Dangerous Ground (1952)
- Walk East on Beacon (1952)
- The Hitch-Hiker (1953)
- Dragnet (1954)
- The Phenix City Story (1955)
- Man on a String (1960)
- The Cool World (1963)
- The Insect Woman (1963)
- A Hard Day's Night (1964)
- The Endless Summer (1966)
- The St. Valentine's Day Massacre (1967)
- Night Flight from Moscow (1973)

== Notable directors associated with semidocumentary ==
- Richard Fleischer
- Louis de Rochemont
- Gordon Douglas
- Henry Hathaway

== See also ==
- Docufiction
- Docudrama
- Film gris
- Cinema verite
- Mockumentary
