= Martin Verhoeven =

American scholar and translator

Personal life
- Born: Martin J. Verhoeven; December 2, 1946 (age 79) Appleton, Wisconsin, United States
- Education: University of Wisconsin-Madison (BA, MA, PhD)
- Occupation: Professor

Religious life
- Religion: Buddhism

Senior posting
- Teacher: Hsuan Hua

Martin J. Verhoeven (born December 2, 1946) is an American scholar, translator, and former Buddhist monk. He is a senior disciple of Hsuan Hua, and currently serves as dean of academics at Dharma Realm Buddhist University. He has previously served as adjunct professor at the Graduate Theological Union and as a lecturer at the University of California at Berkeley. He is best known for completing a three steps one bow pilgrimage with companion Heng Sure. During this pilgrimage Verhoeven and Heng Sure bowed from South Pasadena to Ukiah, California, a distance of 800 miles, over the course of two years and six months.

== Education ==
Verhoeven completed his BA in 1969, his MA in 1971, and his PhD in 1997, all at the University of Wisconsin-Madison.

== Career ==
In 1976, Verhoeven met and trained under the Buddhist teacher Hsuan Hua. He became a monk (under the name Heng Chau) that same year, and undertook a two-year bowing pilgrimage with fellow monk, Heng Sure.

== Selected publications ==
1998: "Americanizing the Buddha," in The Faces of Buddhism in America. University of California Press.

2001: "Glistening Frost and Cooking Sand: Unalterable Aspects of Purity in Chan Buddhist Meditation," in Purity of Heart and Contemplation: A Monastic Dialogue Between Christian and Asian Traditions. Continuum.

2001. “Buddhism and Science: Probing the Boundaries of Faith and Reason,” Religion East and West, Issue 1.

2006: Buddhist Ideas about No-Self and the Person. Religion East & West.

2013: “Science Through Buddhist Eyes,” The New Atlantis, Number 39.

2014: The Sixth Patriarch’s Dharma Jewel Platform Sutra. Editor, Translator. Buddhist Text Translation Society.

2016: Highway Dharma Letters. Buddhist Text Translation Society.
