= Feketić =

Feketić Фекетић (Serbian) Bácsfeketehegy (Hungarian)
- Village (Selo)
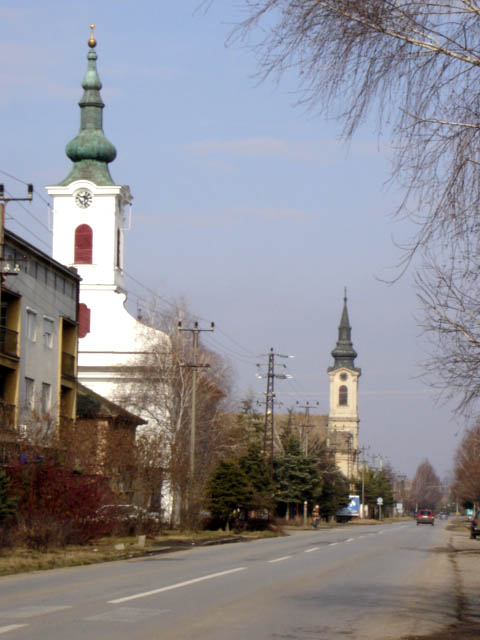
- Main street with Calvinist and the abandoned Lutheran Church

- Location within Vojvodina Location within Serbia Location within Europe
- Coordinates: 45°40′N 19°42′E
- Country: Serbia
- Province: Vojvodina
- District: North Bačka District
- Municipality: Mali Iđoš

Area
  - Total: 59.3 km^{2} (22.9 sq mi)
- Elevation: 96 m (315 ft)

Population (2022)
  - Total: 3,280
  - Density: 55.3/km^{2} (143/sq mi)
- Time zone: UTC+1 (CET)
  - Summer (DST): UTC+2 (CEST)

Feketić (Serbian Cyrillic: Фекетић, Hungarian: Bácsfeketehegy, German: Feketitsch or Schwarzenberg) is a village located in the Mali Iđoš municipality, in the North Bačka District of Serbia. It is situated in the Autonomous Province of Vojvodina. The village has population of 3,280 inhabitants.

== History ==
The settlement is first mentioned in 1465 as Feketehegyház.

== Demographics ==
=== Historical population ===
- 1961: 5,387
- 1971: 4,818
- 1981: 4,688
- 1991: 4,542
- 2002: 4,336
- 2011: 3,890
- 2022: 3,280

=== Ethnic groups ===
According to data from the 2022 census, ethnic groups in the village include:

- 1,774 (54.1%) Hungarians
- 770 (23.4%) Serbs
- 248 (7.5%) Montenegrins
- 160 (4.8%) Roma
- Others/Undeclared/Unknown

== Notable people ==
- Maurice Krishaber, naturalised French Hungarian otorhinolaryngologist.
- Ana Pešikan, former Minister of Science and Technology in the Government of Serbia.
- Yuri Schwebler, conceptual artist

== See also ==
- List of places in Serbia
- List of cities, towns and villages in Vojvodina
