= Martha G. Thorwick =

American physician

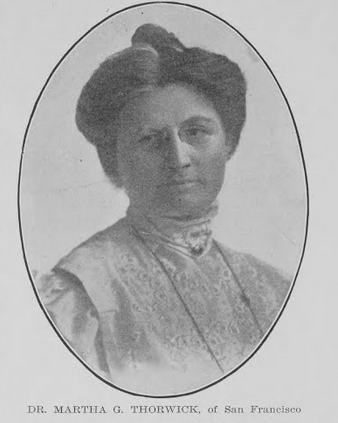
Martha G. Thorwick, from a 1911 publication.

Martha G. Thorwick (1863 – November 16, 1921) was a Norwegian-born American clubwoman and medical doctor based in San Francisco, California, whose personal life was the subject of scandal and headlines.

== Early life ==
Martha Gurine Thorwick was born in Tingvoll Municipality in Nordmøre, Norway, and immigrated to Chicago as a girl. She attended Jenner Medical College and the University of Illinois and earned her medical degree in 1901.

== Career ==
Thorwick had a medical practice in San Francisco from 1901. In 1920 she was listed as affiliated with the Mendocino State Hospital; in 1921, she resigned from a post as physician at the California School for Girls in Ventura; her resignation precipitated a school-wide violent protest.

Thorwick was also active in Scandinavian women's organizations in San Francisco. She founded NORA (a Norwegian women's hospital charity) and was its president for several years. She also helped to organize the Daughters of Norway Lodge Anna Kolbjornsen No. 4, and served as secretary of the Danish Sisterhood.

== Personal life ==
In 1915, Martha G. Thorwick married her patient, Niso Secondo di Giannini, an Italian count and World War I veteran she first met in Chicago. However, the count soon accused Thorwick of trickery, medical malpractice, and abuse, and sued for annulment on the basis of "fraud and duress". They divorced; in 1917 he announced that he was returning to France, because "I prefer the front line trenches to matrimony." He nonetheless continued to harass Dr. Thorwick, narrowly avoiding a jail sentence for his activities.

Martha Gurine Thorwick di Giannini died in 1921, aged 58 years, from stomach cancer, in San Francisco.
