= Erwin Walker =

American criminal

William Erwin Walker
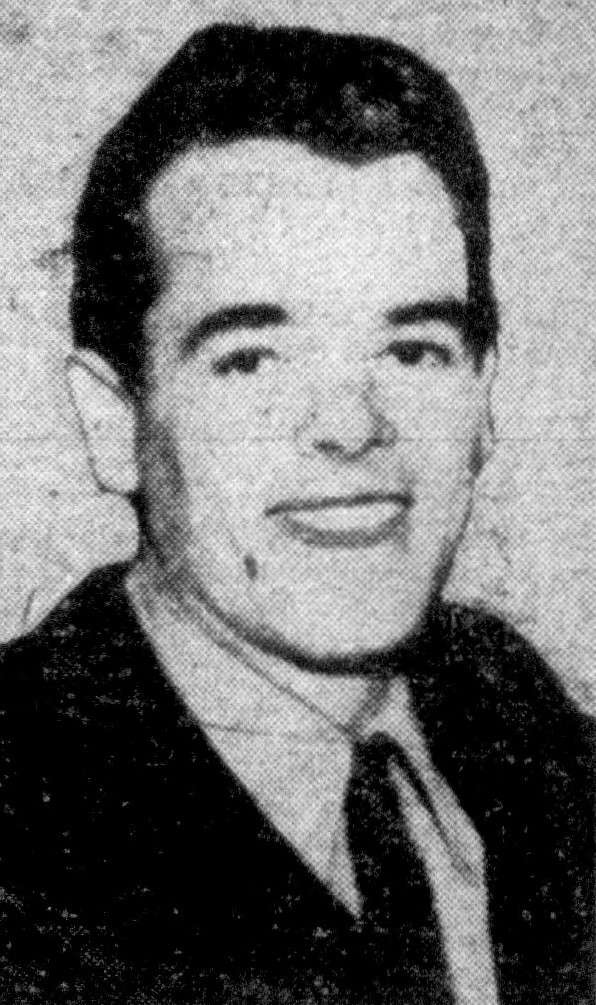
- Walker in an undated image from the Los Angeles Daily News
- Born: Erwin Mathias Walker; October 6, 1917; California, U.S.
- Died: October 7, 2008 (aged 91); California, U.S.
- Other names: Paul C. Norris, Erwin M. Walker, Machine Gun Walker
- Occupation: Criminal
- Status: Deceased
- Conviction: First degree murder
- Penalty: Death; commuted to life imprisonment

William Erwin Walker, also known as Erwin M. Walker and Machine Gun Walker (born Erwin Mathias Walker; October 6, 1917− October 7, 2008), was an American police employee and United States Army World War II veteran, known for having committed several thefts, burglaries, and shootouts with police in Los Angeles County, California, in 1945 and 1946, one of which resulted in a fatality. The film He Walked by Night (1948) was loosely based on Walker's 1946 crime spree.

== Early life ==
Little is known about Walker's early life. He was born Erwin Mathias Walker in 1917 to Weston and Irene Walker, and was raised in Glendale, California. He lived with his parents and a sister. Weston Walker was a Los Angeles County flood control engineer, and his uncle Herbert V. Walker was a prominent Los Angeles lawyer and Chief Deputy District Attorney who became a Los Angeles County Superior Court Judge. Herbert Walker's most notable action as a Superior Court Judge was to sign the ninth and final death warrant for Caryl Chessman, the "Red Light Bandit."

Although nearsighted, Walker was a good athlete. He would later be described as "gentle, affectionate, considerate above the ordinary for the welfare of others, and [giving] no trouble in any way." Walker graduated from the Hoover School and attended the California Institute of Technology for one year, excelling in electronics and radio engineering.

== Police and military service ==
After he dropped out of Caltech, Walker worked as a radio operator and police dispatcher for the Glendale Police Department. During World War II, he was conscripted by Selective Service despite his poor eyesight because of his radio and electronics skills. Walker was stationed in Brisbane, Australia, where he attended the South West Pacific Area (SWPA) U.S. Army Officer Candidate School (OCS) at Camp Columbia, Wacol. In 1944, Walker graduated from OCS and was commissioned a second lieutenant in the U.S. Army.

In June 1944, Walker received his first duty assignment. In November, he received orders transferring him to Leyte Island in the Philippines, where he was placed in charge of a Signal Corps radar detachment with 85 men. Walker was apparently well liked by the soldiers who worked with him, and he was reputed to be more than usually considerate of them.

In later testimony, Walker related that upon arrival at Leyte, he and another officer, a close friend, selected the emplacement for the radar and took routine security measures but did not post a day guard because of standing orders. Walker was ordered to return to his ship. When he returned to the radar site the next day, he learned that elements of an elite Japanese Army paratroop unit had attacked the radar site at sunrise. He learned that John Brake of Rocky Mount, North Carolina, his closest friend, who was also his commanding officer and fellow Signal Corps OCS graduate, had been bayoneted in the neck and disemboweled in the initial assault. Brake survived, and after years of hospital care, managed to live a productive life, despite being paralyzed from the neck down, until his death in 1989. All other members of the unit who had remained at the initial site were killed and horribly mutilated by their attackers, including disembowelment and amputation while they were still alive. It is likely that Walker's experiences witnessing the aftermath of the attack affected him deeply.

Although Walker and his men were not combat infantrymen, his unit was not reinforced after the initial assault, and the small detachment endured three days and nights of continuous battle with fanatical Japanese paratroopers, who inflicted many casualties. While a subsequent investigation found no dereliction of duty on the part of any of the officers in the detachment, Walker later testified that he felt responsible for what had happened. After the encounter on Leyte, Walker informed his commanding officer that he could not continue to serve and asked to return to the United States. He was released from active duty in the South Pacific in December 1944, but was promoted to first lieutenant in July 1945, three months after his arrival in the United States.

According to his own later statements and those of his family, Walker returned from overseas duty deeply disturbed and convinced that he was responsible for the death of soldiers in his unit by not preparing defenses for his position. He later described his guilt over his best friend's death, which he believed might have been prevented if he had ordered his men to dig foxholes. Walker would later claim his guilt was intensified by the anger of the soldiers who had served with him but shunned him thereafter. He never again lived with his family, instead renting an apartment and living alone. His family said that he was morose, melancholy, taciturn, brooding, rough with small children, secretive, and difficult. He took several jobs but always quit them after a short time. Walker turned down an offer from the Glendale Police Department to return to his old job, reportedly because of the low pay. He was reportedly often seen brandishing a machine gun.

== Initial crime spree ==
Early in 1945, still on active duty as an Army First Lieutenant, Walker burglarized an auto repair garage, taking a set of tools, voltmeter, and radio tuner. In August 1945, he entered an Army Ordnance warehouse at night and stole seven 45-caliber Thompson submachine guns, twelve .45-caliber pistols, six .38-caliber revolvers, ammunition, holsters, and magazines. Walker was discharged from the Army in November 1945. During his first week of terminal leave, he stole an automobile, changed its license plates, and used it to transfer some of the stolen goods. He next broke into a clothing store and took several pieces of men's clothing. Walker next targeted the warehouses and offices of record and film companies, taking amplifiers, electronic equipment, records, movie projectors, recording turntables, cameras, and other equipment. He rented a garage, fitting it out as an experimental workshop.

Using the garage as his base of operations, Walker continued to commit burglaries to pay his living expenses and acquire electronic equipment. His criminal spree eventually totaled more than a dozen armed robberies, safecracking, and burglaries, netting him a sum of approximately $70,000. Walker later explained that his crimes were motivated by a desire to gather funds and equipment to build an electronic radar gun (which, by shooting a beam, would disintegrate metal into powder) so that he could force the government to pass legislation raising soldiers' pay. That would, in turn, increase the cost of war to a point that it could not be waged profitably.

Using the alias "Paul C. Norris", Walker contacted Willard W. Starr, a sound engineer who bought and sold motion picture and sound recording equipment out of his home, to sell him a collection of commercial motion-picture equipment. Starr immediately suspected that the motion-picture equipment had been stolen and alerted the police.

On April 25, 1946, LAPD Hollywood division detectives Lieutenant Colin C. Forbes, and his partner, Sergeant Stewart W. Johnson, staked out Starr's home to wait for the suspect's arrival. As Walker approached the house, the detectives emerged to confront him. Walker opened fire, and Forbes was hit in the abdomen at pointblank range after his own pistol jammed. Johnson wounded Walker in the stomach and left leg with at least two bullets from his .38-caliber service revolver. Despite his wounds, Walker escaped on foot using the labyrinth of storm drains under the city. Forbes and Johnson were both rushed to a hospital, where Forbes was found to have a .45-caliber bullet lodged against his spine. He recovered although doctors were unable to remove the bullet and had to leave it in place.

In May 1946, Walker committed another burglary by stealing rolls of safety-detonating fuse and priming cord. To open safes and break locks, Walker made his own explosive, nitroglycerine, by using fuming nitric acid, sulfuric acid, and glycerine. On June 5, 1946, Walker drove to a meat market at the corner of Los Feliz Boulevard and Brunswick Avenue in Glendale, California. According to Walker's court testimony, after severing the lock on the store with bolt cutters, he then put on his own padlock. Walker then hid the bolt cutters in an adjoining area, got into his car, and drove around the block to see if he had been observed. Not seeing anyone, he retrieved the bolt cutters and returned to his car, again driving around the block. Getting out of his car, Walker said he saw a person with a flashlight in the vicinity of where he had hidden the bolt cutters. He watched the person with the flashlight enter a car and drive it toward him.

As the car drew opposite him, Walker recognized the person as a policeman. California Highway Patrol Officer Loren Cornwell Roosevelt, the one-time police chief of Arcadia, California, called Walker to his car and asked what he was doing in the neighborhood. Walker responded that he was going to see a girlfriend. The officer, sitting behind the steering wheel with a flashlight in his left hand and his right hand on the butt of his gun, asked the defendant for his identification. Walker stated that he slowly eased a loaded .45 automatic pistol from under his belt and pointed it at Officer Roosevelt, who drew his own police service revolver in response. Walker testified that he shot Officer Roosevelt twice, ducked, and ran, abandoning his own car and again escaping via the storm drains. According to detectives who interviewed him, Walker told a slightly different version of what happened at the time of his arrest, declaring that Officer Roosevelt had shot at him first, which forced Walker to duck and return fire, hitting Roosevelt twice. Walker then elaborated that Roosevelt had asked him to call an ambulance, and Walker responded that he would do nothing for him.

The gunfire awoke residents in the area, who called police. According to later newspaper accounts, Officer Roosevelt returned fire but was apparently unable to place a radio call for help because of his wounds. Hit multiple times by .45-caliber bullets, Officer Roosevelt was rushed to a nearby hospital. Although badly wounded, Officer Roosevelt was able, before his death, to give both a physical description of his assailant and a different account of his encounter with Walker and the subsequent gunfight. Roosevelt told investigators that he was returning to his home in the early morning hours, he began a pursuit of a speeding vehicle on Los Feliz Boulevard, which slowed to a crawl after Roosevelt overtook the vehicle, at which time the driver opened fire without warning.

While Walker stated that he shot Officer Roosevelt twice, later newspaper accounts stated that Roosevelt was hit by no fewer than nine .45-caliber bullets. If Officer Roosevelt's account of the shooting is correct, the fact that he was hit nine times at night by .45-caliber bullets strongly indicates that Walker actually shot Roosevelt from his car with a burst of automatic fire from a Thompson submachine gun.

Roosevelt died in hospital a few hours after the shooting. Walker's abandoned car was found to contain bolt cutters, a loaded Thompson submachine gun, a bag of tools, sap, sash cord, bell wire, hacksaw blades, hand drill, electric drill, crescent wrenches, pry bar, extension cord, hammer, pliers, wire cutters, nitroglycerine, adhesive tape, a percussion-type dynamite blasting cap crimped to a white blasting fuse, and a primer cord attached to the percussion cap. Following the fatal shooting of Officer Roosevelt, Walker abandoned safecracking and briefly worked at several jobs. He then experimented with making California license plates and drivers' licenses, which could be used in selling several cars that he had stolen. By December 1946, Walker was robbing liquor stores at gunpoint.

== Arrest and conviction ==
Acting on a tip, police located Walker living at a duplex apartment at 1831 1/2 N. Argyle Avenue in Los Angeles.

At 2 a.m., December 20, 1946, three detectives (Officers Wynn, Donahue, and Rombeau) entered Walker's apartment by using a key provided by the owner. Walker, who had been asleep with a .45-caliber pistol at his bedside table, was caught reaching for a Thompson submachine gun on the bed beside him when the three detectives burst into the living room. After a fierce struggle for the submachine gun in which the arresting officers twice shot Walker in the shoulder and broke the butt of a pistol over his head, Walker was finally handcuffed and arrested. According to the detectives, Walker stated: "All right, now, you have me. Do a good job." Detective Donahue asked Walker why he killed the highway patrolman, to which Walker replied that he "had to." When asked, "Did you shoot the two officers in Hollywood?" Walker answered, "Yes." The officers saw that Walker was bleeding badly, and they attempted to make him comfortable by covering him and putting a pillow under his head. Officers testified that Walker stayed conscious throughout the arrest and transport to the hospital.

Walker's apartment was filled with weapons, ammunition, and license plates; three cars that had been stolen by Walker were found nearby. Walker had apparently been expecting to be stopped by police again, as one of his stolen cars was fitted with a loaded Thompson submachine gun set to automatic fire and fixed in position so as to fire through the driver's door. At the hospital, Walker was found to have scars from bullet wounds, a souvenir of the April gun battle with Forbes' partner, Sergeant Stewart Johnson. Walker stated that he had treated those on his own. Police later obtained additional statements from Walker as he lay wounded on an ambulance stretcher on the way to the Georgia Street Receiving Hospital for emergency treatment. Despite his wounds, Walker told one of the detectives that he had been stopped the previous week by two motorcycle patrolmen on Hollywood Boulevard for a minor traffic violation but had been given only a warning: "Lucky for them they didn't try to make me get out of the car. I had a submachine gun with me then. You might have had two more dead cops."

Detective Wynn would later testify at Walker's trial that on the morning of December 21, 1946, he talked with the petitioner for about an hour at the hospital, and Walker had made statements indicating that he murdered Officer Roosevelt during an attempt to commit a burglary, that Walker had committed the attempted murders of Detectives Forbes and Johnson in addition to various robberies and burglaries, and that his statements were freely and voluntarily made. At the time, Wynn testified that a stenographic reporter named Bechtel came and the conversation was repeated and transcribed in the hospital room at which a doctor and nurse were also present. The detective further testified that he visited Walker two days later at the hospital, where Walker again made admissions. Officer Forbes, who had been seriously wounded by Walker, testified that on December 28, 1946, he talked with Walker at the hospital, and the petitioner made various admissions to him as well.

Detective Wynn told the court that on December 30, 1946, he again visited Walker as he was being prepared for transfer from the hospital to jail. Wynn stated that Walker "kept asking me for opiates" and asked the detective to request some from the doctor. Wynn said he tried to do so but that Walker's doctor refused. In response to a question about his condition, Walker told Wynn that he was "a little weak" but did not complain about any discomfort. En route to jail, Detective Wynn testified that he told Walker that he would like to film a reenactment of the killing of Highway Patrolman Roosevelt and asked if Walker had any objection to which Walker replied he would like to contact his attorney first, Mr. Gerald Frederick Girard of Hindin, Weiss & Girard in Los Angeles. Walker gave Wynn the attorney's card. Wynn stated that after he tried unsuccessfully to reach Girard, he asked if Walker had any objection to going to Griffith Park and Soledad Canyon to recover articles that Walker had left there. Walker stated "he didn't see anything wrong in that." Wynn, Walker, and several officers proceeded to Griffith Park and Soledad Canyon, where the articles were duly recovered, and Walker made additional incriminating statements."

After Walker's arrest, his parents claimed a long history of insanity existed in both branches of the family. A great-great-great-grandfather went insane for nine months. A great-great-granduncle, great-great-grandfather, and great-grandaunt also spent time in insane asylums. A great-grandfather committed suicide, as did a grand-aunt. A grandmother was confined at Patton State Psychiatric Hospital, while a grand-aunt had hallucinations. Finally, one of Walker's cousins was intellectually disabled, while the cousin's father had "psycho-neurosis".

Walker later pleaded not guilty by reason of insanity. At his trial on June 2, 1947, Walker's attorney Gerald Frederick Girard cited Walker's previous excellent record, his war experiences, and a family history of mental illness (Walker's paternal grandfather had been confined to a state mental hospital for 32 years). Walker's parents, Weston and Irene L. Walker, testified in his defense. Mrs. Walker stated that Erwin was kind and affectionate while he was growing up but returned from the war as a depressed loner.

However, the trial judge found Walker sane, noting that Walker himself testified at great length in the trial and demonstrating a mentality and scientific learning far above the average: "This is a case in which I feel my responsibility very greatly.... The defendant, of course, in his lengthy time on the witness stand here showed a high degree of intelligence. I seldom recall a more intelligent witness, a witness who gave clearer responses to the questions than did Mr. Walker. It is true that he had a war experience that, in the vernacular of the service men, might be termed 'rugged', but without analyzing it or comparing it too much, I would say that perhaps millions of his fellow Americans had experiences that were equally rugged during the war.... A killing in an attempt to perpetrate a burglary is murder of the first degree.... However, I believe that in addition to my finding that the killing of Loren Roosevelt was murder in the first degree as a matter of law, I feel that it was a deliberate killing, a purposeful killing on the defendant's part."

Walker was sentenced to death in the gas chamber. After a motion for a new trial and appeal to overturn Walker's conviction and death sentence were rejected in December 1948, Walker's father, Weston, committed suicide by hanging.

Walker was sent to death row in San Quentin to await execution of his sentence. At San Quentin, he was diagnosed by a prison psychiatrist as having paranoid schizophrenia. On April 14, 1949, thirty-six hours before his scheduled execution, a corrections officer found Walker unconscious after an apparent suicide attempt in which Walker tried to hang himself with a radio headphone cord wrapped around his neck. He was successfully revived, and the execution was postponed indefinitely while a psychiatric examination was performed.

== Mental health treatment ==
After his attempted suicide, Walker was examined by a psychiatric board, which delivered its report in April 1949. The examining board reported that Walker was agitated by fear of his impending death and was "negativistic, mute, fearful, and unresponsive and possibly reacting to hallucinations" and frequently lapsed into semi-unconsciousness. The psychiatrists determined Walker "does not know the difference between right and wrong," thus making him insane under the legal standard of the day and ineligible for execution.

His execution was postponed indefinitely. At his competency hearing, Walker was declared insane by a jury and committed to the Mendocino State Hospital in Talmage, California, where he would remain the next 12 years. When not receiving electroshock therapy and other treatments, Walker spent most of his time at Mendocino reading mostly chemistry textbooks. He remained aloof from the other patients, stating that "even dying in the gas chamber might have been preferable to having to be with these creatures."

In 1961, Walker was declared sane by a newly convened panel of psychiatric examiners. On March 28, 1961, in response to a clemency hearing appeal by Walker, Governor Pat Brown commuted Walker's death sentence to life imprisonment without possibility of parole. Walker was sent to the CMF State Prison Facility, Vacaville to serve out his sentence, where he continued studying chemistry while he worked in a laboratory on the prison campus.

While Walker was a patient at Mendocino State Hospital until he was a prisoner at the Vacaville Medical Facility, he was a patient at Atascadero State Hospital, a maximum-security mental hospital located near Atascadero, California. He played the tenor saxophone with various musical groups in the hospital and was a talented musician although, as he said, "I have a little difficulty fingering the sax because of nerve damage caused by an old bullet wound."

Walker was reportedly well-liked by both patients and staff, and as a result, he was subsequently granted a "white card," which permitted him access to hiking trails located outside the hospital building but within the boundaries of institutional property. He was concerned about eventually being sent back to death row and so he put together a back pack with food and escaped, walking several miles through nearby hills. A short time later, he was apprehended when he was discovered by two armed duck hunters near the Cuesta Grade area of Highway 101. Walker was returned to the hospital and his white card privileges revoked, but he re-established himself as a model patient and was recruited to be a mentor in a Senior-Junior Big Brother type program on Ward 21, which housed responsible adult men, mostly military veterans, and dysfunctional teenage boys. Walker continued to do well at Atascadero State Hospital until one day, without notice, he was given just a few minutes to get ready to be transferred back to the state prison system. He took time to make sure that the property he borrowed from other patients was returned and to say goodbye to many of his friends.

== Habeas corpus petitions and release on parole ==
In 1970, Walker filed a habeas corpus petition with the Supreme Court of California, which was denied without a hearing. Walker filed a similar petition in the Solano County Superior Court and sought to have his 1947 trial set aside on several grounds, including an allegation that his 1946 confession had been made involuntarily. The case made its way on appeal once more to the Supreme Court of California, which decided the case in February 1974.

While the Supreme Court failed to overturn Walker's conviction or grant him a new trial, it instructed the lower court to delete that portion of Walker's life sentence that excluded any possibility of parole, allowing him to apply to the California Adult Authority for parole and to have his parole application duly considered. Walker applied for parole in 1974, which was granted, and he was released from Vacaville. After a short stay at a halfway house, Walker was released from further parole restrictions. Immediately after leaving prison, he legally changed his name. After obtaining a job as a chemist, he disappeared from public view. Walker died in 2008.

== He Walked by Night ==
In 1948, Eagle-Lion Films released a film that was loosely based on Walker's 1946 crime spree, He Walked by Night. Walker's character, Roy Morgan, was played by actor Richard Basehart. The film was shot in a semidocumentary format on location in and around Los Angeles. In the film, Morgan is shot dead in one of the city's underground drainage tunnels as he attempts to shoot his way out of a police dragnet. The film is notable for featuring actor and writer Jack Webb in the minor role of forensic specialist Lee Whitey; Webb's chance meeting with the film's police consultant inspired him to create Dragnet.
