= Yuri Schwebler =

Yugoslavian-born American artist, sculptor (1942–1990)

- Born: November 21, 1942; Feketić, Yugoslavia
- Died: March 3, 1990 (aged 47); Marlborough, New York, U.S.
- Other name: George Schwebler
- Education: McDaniel College
- Occupations: conceptual artist, sculptor
- Spouse: Joanne Hedge (m. 1968–1970; divorce)

Yuri "George" Schwebler (1942–1990), was a Yugoslavia-born American conceptual artist and sculptor. He was active in the arts in the 1970s in Washington, D.C., and most notably in February 1974, he transformed the Washington Monument into a sundial. He showed his work at the Jefferson Place Gallery.

== Biography ==
Yuri Schwebler was born on November 21, 1942, in Feketić, Yugoslavia (now Serbia), and raised in West Germany. At the time of his birth and early childhood, Nazi Germany occupied Yugoslavia. In 1956, he emigrated and moved with his family to Wilmington, Delaware. He graduated from Warner Junior High School and Seaford High School (in 1962) in Delaware.

He attended Western Maryland College (now McDaniel College). In 1965, Schwebler was drafted in to the United States Army Reserve. After his discharge from the U.S. Army, he started using the anglicized name George Schwebler. By 1967, he moved to Washington, D.C. He had been married to Joanne Hedge from 1968 to 1970. Together they moved to Marin County, California, and for a time he worked at the Sausalito Art Center. When the marriage dissolved in March 1970, he spent two months at the Mendocino State Hospital before returning to Washington, D.C.

He moved to New York in 1980, and stopped making art around 1981.

== Death and legacy ==
Schwebler died at age 47 on March 3, 1990, in Marlborough, New York by suicide and carbon monoxide poisoning. He was survived by his partner, artist Enid Sanford, his mother Eva (née Lasi) Schwebler, and two sisters.

His work was part of the posthumous retrospective art exhibition, Yuri Schwebler: The Spiritual Plan (2020) curated by John James Anderson at the American University Museum.

== Work ==
His work Drawing Table: Table Drawing (1971), featured tools placed on a drawing table, and the surface of the drawing table has drawings of the same tools. Other works include Range pole (1975) a plumb bob and a level placed in a glass and wood box; and The Scale of the Horse (?) a small maquette of a horse, a device for enlarging the maquette to appear life size, and a final drawing of a horse. In 1973, Schwebler showed a series of large glass pyramid sculptures at The Phillips Collection.

In a 1981 exhibition in the Hudson River Museum, Schwebler recreated of the art studios for sculptors Alexander Calder (In the Tracks of Calder), Piet Mondrian, Alberto Giacometti (Giacometti’s Table [Where Painting Meets Sculpture], 1981), David Smith and Constantin Brancusi but adding his own creativity on some of them.
