= Hermeneutics (disambiguation) =

Hermeneutics is a theory of text interpretation.

Hermeneutics may also refer to:

- The hermeneutic circle, the process of understanding a text hermeneutically
- Biblical hermeneutics, the study of the principles of interpretation of the Bible
- Environmental hermeneutics, applies the techniques and resources of hermeneutics to environmental issues
- Quranic hermeneutics, study of theories of the interpretation and understanding of the Qur'an, the Muslim holy book
- Talmudic hermeneutics, the rules and methods for investigating the meaning of the Jewish scriptures
- Theological hermeneutics, the application of hermeneutics to theological texts
- Vedic hermeneutics (Mīmāṃsā), the exegesis of the Vedas, the earliest holy texts of Hinduism
- Hermeneutic style, an elaborate style of Latin in early medieval Europe

== See also ==
- Double hermeneutic
- Hermetic (disambiguation)
- Hermeneumata
