= Developing Virtue Secondary School =

Private Buddhist secondary school in Talmage, California (USA)

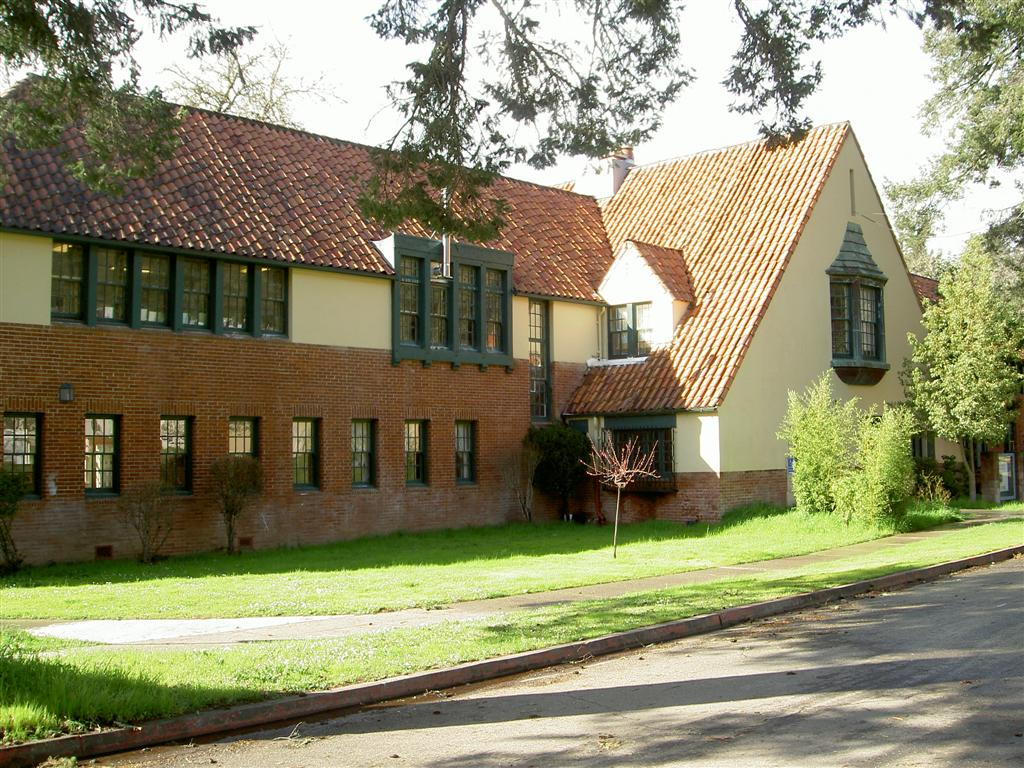
- Boys Division Building

Location
- 2001 Talmage Road; Ukiah, Mendocino Co., California 95482; USA
- 39.1324°N 123.1626°W

Information
- Type: Private Secondary
- Religious affiliation: Buddhist
- Established: 1981
- Founder: Hsuan Hua
- Status: Open
- Principal: Juan Gracia (Boys) / Dharma Master Jin Jr (Girls)
- Grades: 7-12
- Enrollment: 100+
- Campus: Rural
- Colors: Blue █ and Gold █
- Mascot: Dragon
- Affiliations: CTTB, DRBA
- Website: igdvs.org
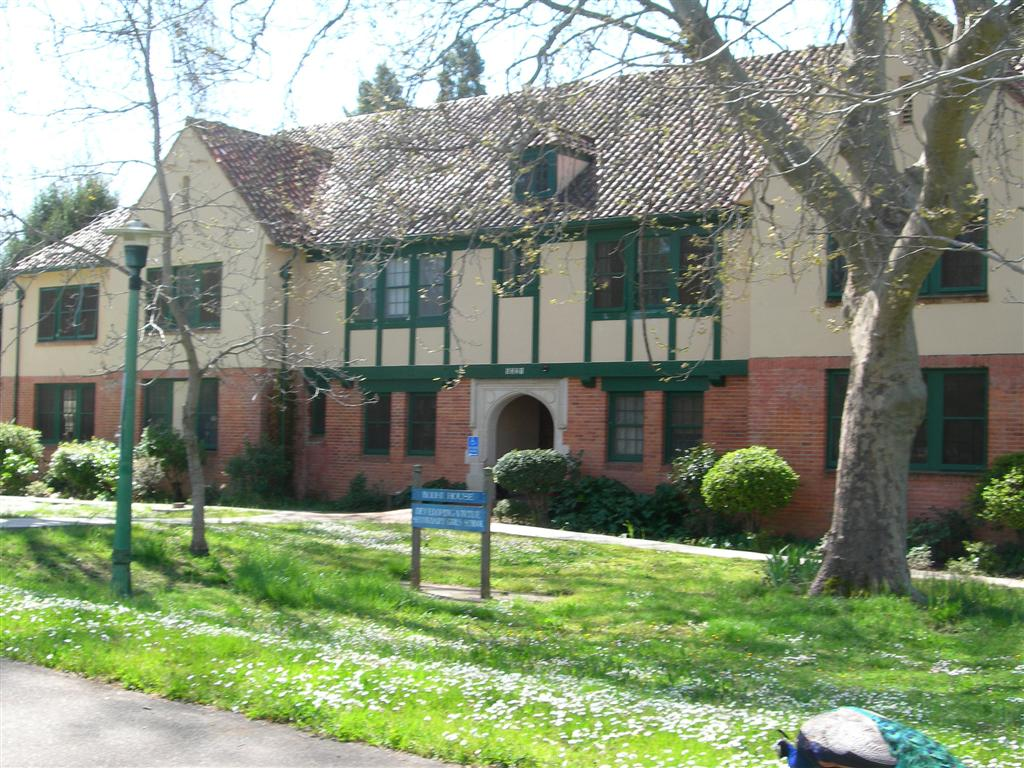
- Girls Division Building

Developing Virtue Secondary School (DVSS, Chinese: 培德中學; pinyin: Péidé Zhōngxué) is a private Buddhist school located in the town of Talmage, California, and the first Buddhist high school founded in the United States.

The school is part of the City of Ten Thousand Buddhas, one of the biggest Buddhist monasteries in the Western Hemisphere, and is operated under the auspices of the Dharma Realm Buddhist Association.

== Community ==
Although DVS is located in the United States, the students are predominantly Asian, many being from Taiwan or Malaysia. Most of these students live in the school's dormitories within the City of Ten Thousand Buddhas.

The school has gained much attention from the local communities of Ukiah and Talmage, where students have staged performances, marches, and participated in city contests and sports. DVS is often referred to by local community as the "Buddhist school". DVS also celebrates the annual celebration of Honoring Elders Day and Cherishing Youth Day, when local elders and youth come to the schools to participate in performances and a celebration of life and youth.

== Campus ==
The entire school is located within the City of Ten Thousand Buddhas.

The classrooms for the Girls' division occupy two two-story Tudor-style brick buildings on the southwestern side of CTTB's campus, and the Boys' division's classrooms are located up on the northeastern side in one large building. Both divisions have separate dorm buildings adjacent to the classrooms for boarding students, and basketball courts and soccer fields.

The two schools share an art studio, an assembly hall (Confucius Hall), science classrooms/labs, and a cafeteria.

=== Curriculum ===
DVS students have a curriculum very similar to that in public schools (and approved by the University of California), but several classes unique to DVS are taken by students, including:

- Buddhist Studies
- Virtue Studies
- World Religions Studies
- Meditation
- Chinese

=== Tests ===
Other than regular standardized testing for college admissions, students are encouraged to take the Advanced Placement tests offered annually in a variety of subjects offered. While some AP classes are officially taught and offered throughout the year, students are also encouraged to conduct independent study in the AP class of their choice should it not be offered during the current academic year.

== History ==
The predecessor to DVS, Instilling Goodness Elementary School, was first founded at the suggestion of San Francisco City Supervisor Carol Ruth Silver in 1976 by the Venerable Master Hsuan Hua. Starting out with just eight students, the school soon outgrew its quarters and was moved to Talmage's City of Ten Thousand Buddhas in 1978. Developing Virtue Secondary was officially founded in 1981, and divided into separate Boys and Girls divisions in 1981.

Prior to the founding of the City of Ten Thousand Buddhas and Developing Virtue Secondary Schools, the land was used for the Mendocino Mental Hospital.

The first graduating class of DVS graduated in 1983 with only two students. Over the years, the school slowly grew until by 1996, graduating classes were regularly 10 students or more. The graduating Class of 2004 had 12 graduates, 6 from DVGS and 6 from DVBS. Class of 2018 had 12 graduates from DVBS and 14 graduates from DVGS.

In 2003, DVS became a candidate for accreditation from the Western Association of Schools and Colleges and began a massive remodeling of the campus.

In August 2007, Developing Virtue Secondary School was accredited by the Western Association of Schools and Colleges (WASC).

== See also ==
- Hsuan Hua
- Dharma Realm Buddhist Association
- City of Ten Thousand Buddhas
