= He Walked by Night =

1948 film by Alfred L. Werker, Anthony Mann

- Theatrical release poster
- Directed by: Alfred L. Werker; Anthony Mann (uncredited)
- Screenplay by: John C. Higgins; Crane Wilbur
- Story by: Crane Wilbur
- Produced by: Bryan Foy; Robert Kane
- Starring: Richard Basehart; Scott Brady; Roy Roberts; Jack Webb; Whit Bissell
- Cinematography: John Alton
- Edited by: Alfred DeGaetano
- Music by: Leonid Raab
- Production company: Bryan Foy Productions
- Distributed by: Eagle-Lion Films
- Release date: November 24, 1948 (Los Angeles)
- Running time: 79 minutes
- Country: United States
- Language: English

He Walked by Night is a 1948 American police procedural film noir directed by Alfred L. Werker and an uncredited Anthony Mann. The film, shot in a semidocumentary tone, is loosely based on the real-life actions of Erwin "Machine-Gun" Walker, a former Glendale, California police department employee and World War II veteran who unleashed a crime spree of burglaries, robberies and shootings in the Los Angeles area between 1945 and 1946.

During production, actor Jack Webb met the film's police technical advisor Marty Wynn and was inspired by a conversation with Wynn to create the radio program Dragnet, which later became the first modern police television drama.

He Walked by Night was released by Eagle-Lion Films. The film is notable for its camerawork by renowned film noir cinematographer John Alton.

Today the film is in the public domain.

== Plot ==
On a Los Angeles street, Officer Rob Rawlins, a patrolman on his way home from work, stops a man whom he suspects of being a burglar and is shot and mortally wounded. The minor clues lead nowhere. Two police detectives, Marty Brennan and Chuck Jones, are assigned to catch the killer, Roy Morgan, a brilliant mystery man with no known criminal past. Morgan is hiding in a Hollywood bungalow and listening to police calls on his custom radio in an attempt to avoid capture. His only relationship is with his small dog.

Roy consigns stolen electronic equipment to fence Paul Reeves and is nearly caught when he tries to collect on his property. Reeves, threatened with prosecution, agrees to cooperate. The case crosses the paths of Brennan and Jones, who stake out Reeves's office to arrest and question Roy. However, Roy suspects a trap, and in a brief shootout, he shoots and paralyzes Jones. Jones wounds Roy, who performs surgery on himself to remove the bullet and to avoid the hospital, where his wound would be reported to the police. With his knowledge of police procedures, Roy changes his modus operandi and escalates his crimes to armed robbery. During one robbery, the police manage to recover an ejected casing from his gun. Forensics specialist Lee Whitey matches the ejector marks on the casing to those recovered in the killing of Rawlins and the wounding of Jones, connecting all three shootings to one suspect.

Captain Breen uses the break in the case to gather all of the witnesses to the robberies. They assist Lee in building a composite sketch of the killer. Reeves then identifies Roy from the composite. However, Roy hides in Reeves's car and attempts to intimidate him into revealing details of the police investigation; Reeves alerts the cops staking out his home and Roy flees.

Because the police do not realize that Roy has inside knowledge of their work, the case stalls and Breen reassigns Brennan for poor performance. Jones convinces his partner to stop viewing the case personally. Brennan then digs deeper and learns that Morgan once worked for a local police department as a civilian radio technician before he was drafted into the army. Brennan then obtains Morgan's address through the post office and goes undercover as a milkman to case his apartment for a raid.

The police carry out the raid that night, but Roy, alerted by his dog's barking, flees through the attic and uses the Los Angeles storm-drainage tunnel system as a means of escape. A dragnet and a chase through the drainage tunnels ensue. Roy is finally cornered by the police in a passage when his exit is blocked by the wheel of a police car atop a manhole cover. As police tear gas affects Roy, he staggers and fires one last time at them. He is then shot and killed.

== Cast ==
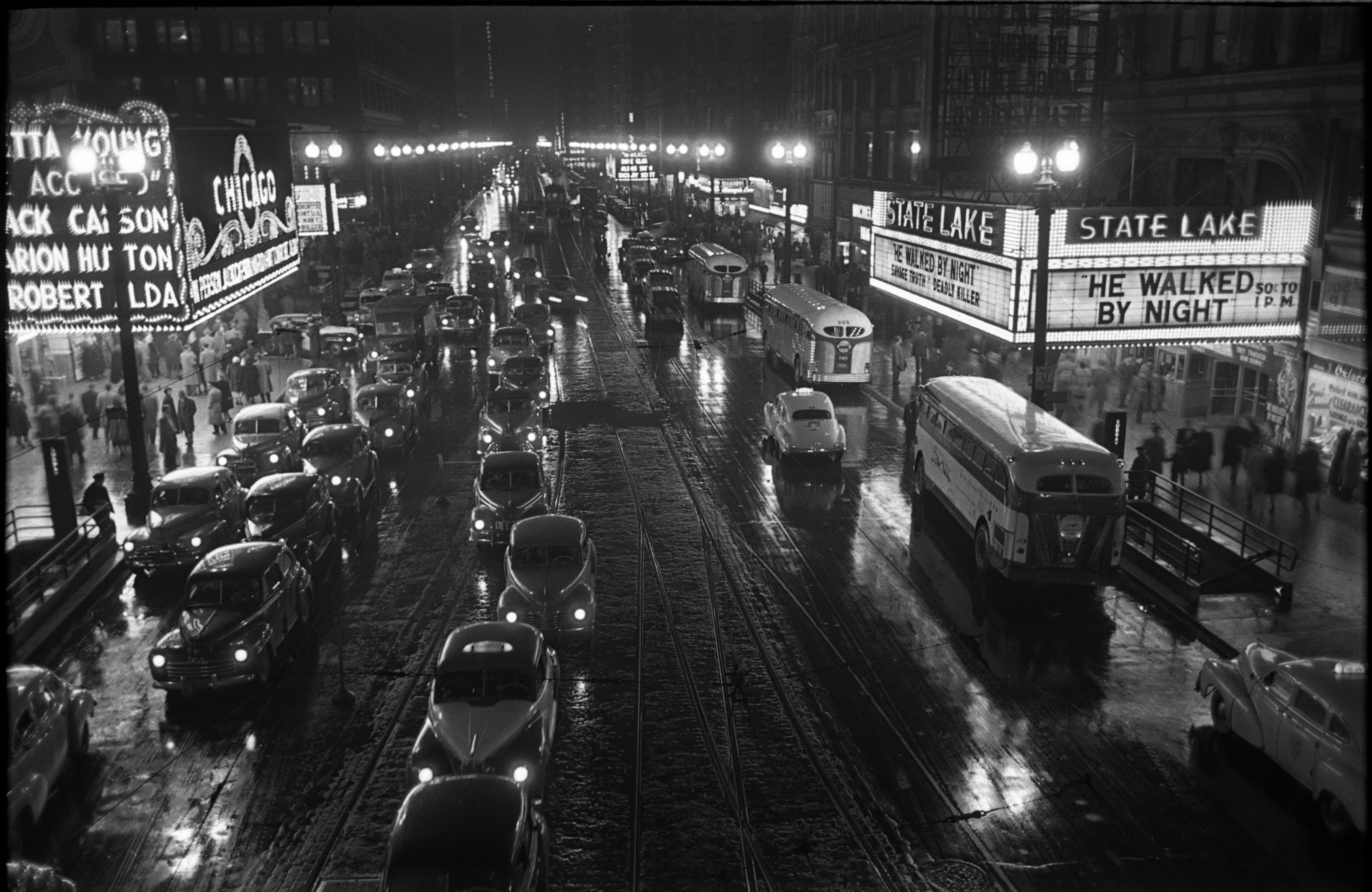
The film's title on State-Lake Theater's marquee, Chicago, by Stanley Kubrick.

- Richard Basehart as Roy Martin/Roy Morgan
- Scott Brady as Sgt. Marty Brennan
- Roy Roberts as Captain Breen
- Whit Bissell as Paul Reeves, electronics dealer
- James Cardwell as Sgt. Chuck Jones
- Jack Webb as Lee Whitey
- Reed Hadley as Narrator

== Reception ==
Variety magazine issued a positive review:

He Walked by Night is a high-tension crime thriller, supercharged with violence but sprung with finesse. Top credits for this film's wallop is shared equally by the several scripters, director Alfred Werker and a small, but superb cast headed by Richard Basehart...Starting in high gear, the film increases in momentum until the cumulative tension explodes in a powerful crime-doesn't pay climax. Striking effects are achieved through counterpoint of the slayer's ingenuity in eluding the cops and the police efficiency in bringing him to book. High-spot of the film is the final sequence which takes place in LA's storm drainage tunnel system where the killer tries to make his getaway. With this role, Basehart establishes himself as one of Hollywood's most talented finds in recent years. He heavily overshadows the rest of the cast, although Scott Brady, Roy Roberts and Jim Cardwell, as the detectives, deliver with high competence. Film is also marked by realistic camera work and a solid score.

=== Accolades ===
- Locarno International Film Festival: Special Prize, Best Police Film, Alfred L. Werker; 1949.

== See also ==
- List of films in the public domain in the United States
