= Talmage, California =

Talmage
- Unincorporated Community; Census Designated Place
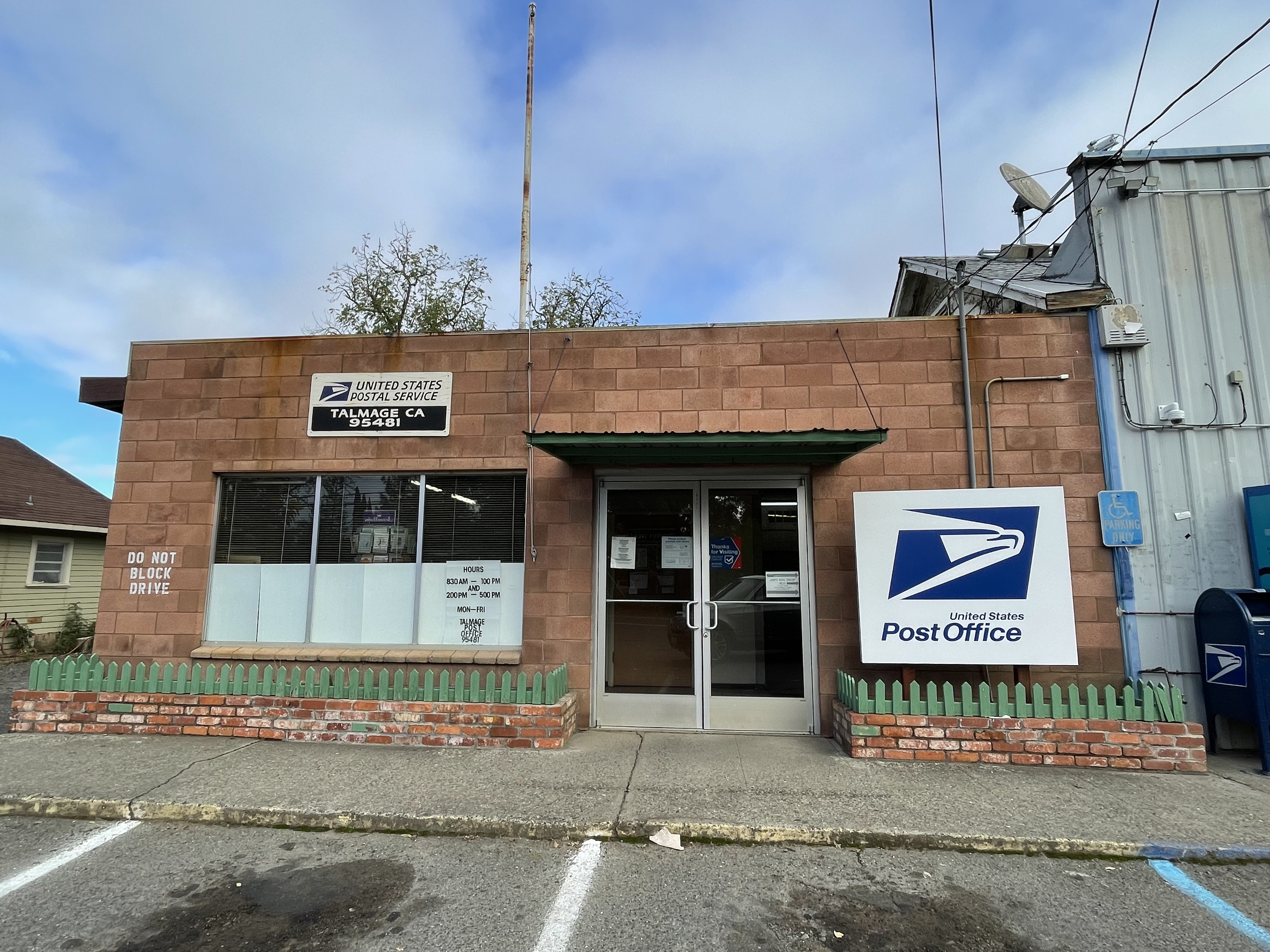
- Talmage Post Office in 2021

- Location in Mendocino County and the state of California

- Location in the United States
- Coordinates: 39°08′00″N 123°10′04″W
- Country: United States
- State: California
- County: Mendocino

Area
  - Total: 1.592 sq mi (4.12 km^{2})
  - Land: 1.590 sq mi (4.12 km^{2})
  - Water: 0.002 sq mi (0.0052 km^{2}) 0.13%
- Elevation: 627 ft (191 m)

Population (2020)
  - Total: 986
  - Density: 620.1/sq mi (239.4/km^{2})
- Time zone: UTC-8 (Pacific (PST))
  - Summer (DST): UTC-7 (PDT)
- ZIP code: 95481
- Area code: 707
- FIPS code: 06-77784
- GNIS feature ID: 1659949

Talmage (variant, Talmadge) is a census-designated place (CDP) in Mendocino County, California, United States. Talmage is located 2.5 miles (4 km) east-southeast of Ukiah, at an elevation of 627 feet (191 m). The population was 986 at the 2020 census, down from 1,130 in 2010. It lies in the southeastern part of the Ukiah Valley and is home to the City of Ten Thousand Buddhas, one of the largest Chan Buddhist temples in the United States. The town's name honors early settler Junius Talmage.

== Geography ==
Talmage is located in southeastern Mendocino County at 39°08′00″N 123°10′04″W. According to the United States Census Bureau, the CDP has a total area of 1.6 square miles (4.1 km^{2}), of which 99.87% is land and 0.13% is water.

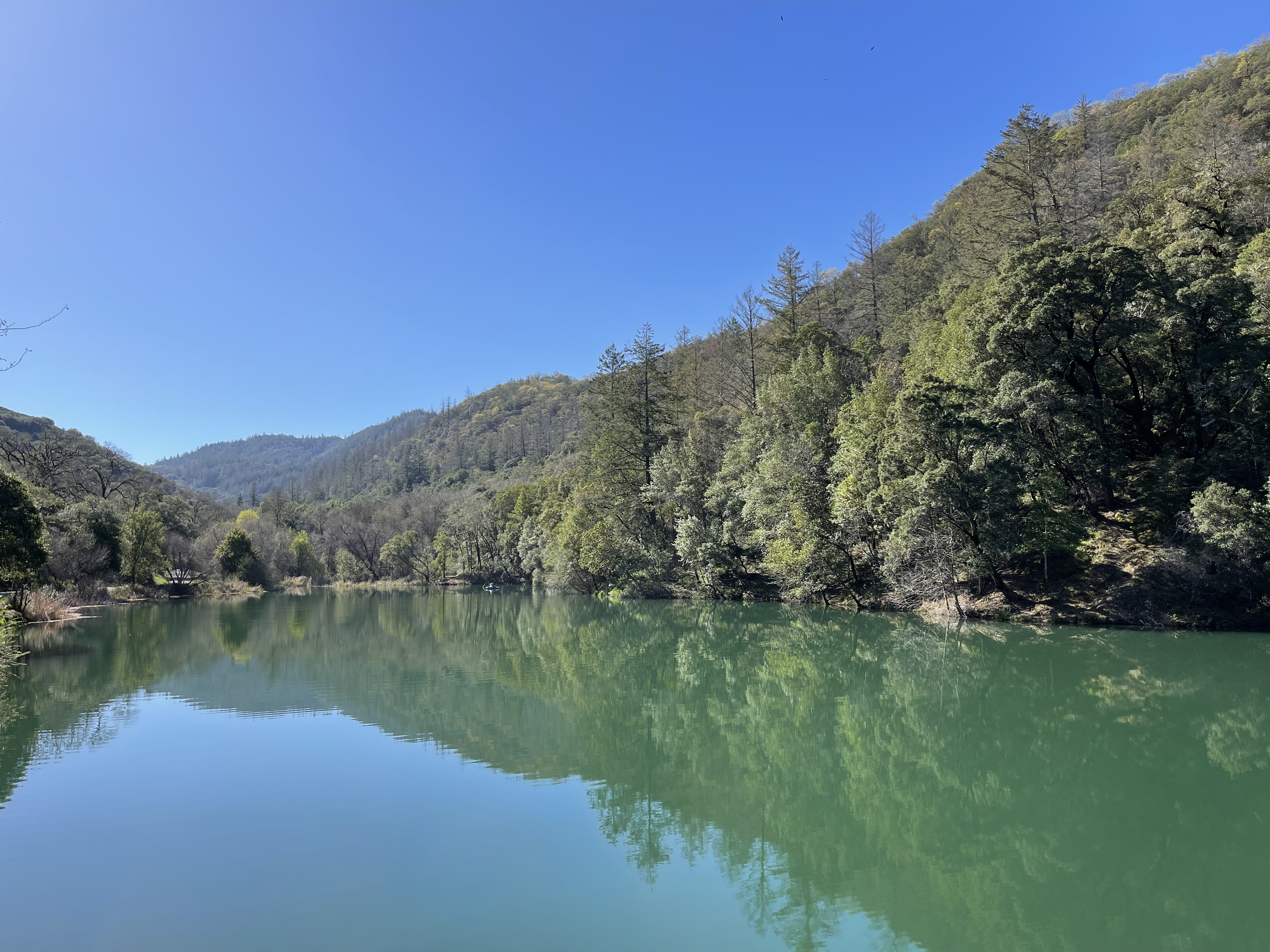
Mill Creek Park in Talmage.

== Sites of interest ==
Talmage is the site of the Mendocino State Hospital (formerly the Mendocino State Asylum for the Insane), the destination for inmates charged with crimes but found not guilty by reason of insanity. The hospital first opened in 1893 with one building at a site near the town of Ukiah, and the hospital was closed in 1972. The City of Ten Thousand Buddhas, a Buddhist community and monastery, is located in the former Mendocino State Hospital. The temple also has an elementary and high school (Developing Virtue Secondary School), as well as a university.

== Politics ==
In the state legislature, Talmage is in the 2nd senatorial district, represented by Democrat Mike McGuire, and the 2nd Assembly district, represented by Democrat Chris Rogers.

Federally, Talmage is in California's 2nd congressional district, represented by Democrat Jared Huffman.

== Demographics ==
Historical population
Census	Pop.	Note	%±
2000	1,141		—
2010	1,130		−1.0%
2020	986		−12.7%
U.S. Decennial Census; 1860–1870 1880-1890; 1900 1910 1920; 1930 1940 1950; 1960 1970 1980; 1990 2000 2010

Talmage first appeared as a census designated place in the 2000 U.S. census.
