= Hsuan Hua =

Chinese Chan Buddhist monk

Hsuan Hua 宣化
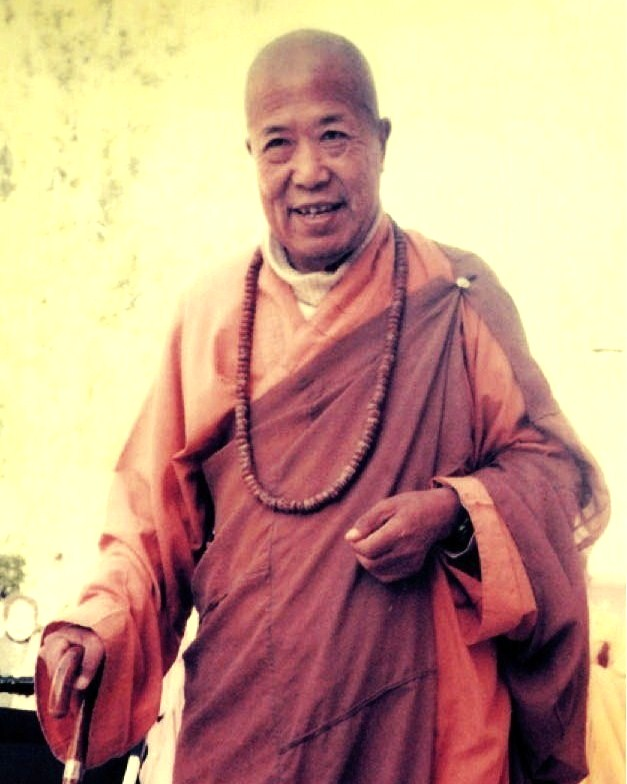
- Hsuan Hua in Ukiah, California
- Title: Chan Master, Founder and abbot of the City of Ten Thousand Buddhas, President of the Dharma Realm Buddhist Association, Rector of the Dharma Realm Buddhist University, the ninth patriarch of guiyang school.

Personal life
- Born: Bai Yushu 白玉書; April 26, 1918 Jilin, China
- Died: June 7, 1995 (aged 77) Long Beach, California, U.S.

Religious life
- Religion: Chan Buddhism
- School: Guyiang School
- Lineage: 9th generation
- Dharma name: An Tzu; Tu Lun

Senior posting
- Teacher: Hsu Yun
- Students: Heng Sure, Heng Lyu, Heng Chau, Heng Lai

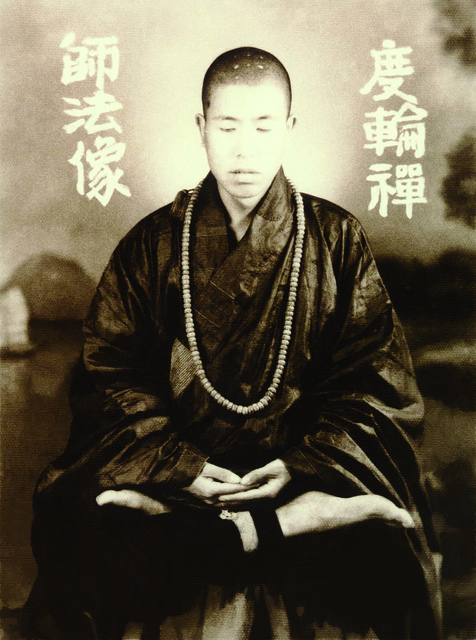
Hsuan Hua meditating in the lotus position. Hong Kong, 1953.

Hsuan Hua (Chinese: 宣化; pinyin: Xuānhuà; lit. 'proclaim and transform'; April 26, 1918 – June 7, 1995), also known as An Tzu, Tu Lun and Master Hua by his Western disciples, was a Chinese monk of Chan Buddhism and a contributing figure in bringing Chinese Buddhism to the United States in the late 20th century.

Hsuan Hua is a founder of several institutions in the US. These include the Dharma Realm Buddhist Association (a Buddhist organization with chapters in North America, Australia and Asia), the City of Ten Thousand Buddhas (one of the first Chan Buddhist monasteries in America, located in Ukiah, California), Dharma Realm Buddhist University, and the Buddhist Text Translation Society, which translates Buddhist scriptures from Chinese into English, Vietnamese, Spanish, and many other languages.

== Early life ==
Hsuan Hua was born on April 26, 1918, the sixteenth day of the third lunar month in the year of wùwǔ (Earth Horse). He was born Bai Yushu or Bai Yuxi simplified Chinese: 白玉书 (白玉禧); traditional Chinese: 白玉書 (白玉璽); pinyin: Bái Yùshū (Bái Yùxǐ); lit. 'White Jade Book (White Jade Jubilee)' in Shuangcheng County of Jilin (now Wuchang, Harbin, Heilongjiang). His mother was a vegetarian and maintained the habit of reciting Amitābha's name throughout her life, serving as an important role model in his early life.

At the age of twelve, he began bowing every day to repent for his faults toward his parents, as an act of filial piety. Later, he felt it was not enough to bow only to them, and began gradually extending his bows to his teachers, the Emperor, the heavens, and the earth, until he finally began bowing to all living beings, hoping to bring peace to the world. He practiced these bows every morning and evening, each time making more than 830 bows, which took five hours a day. With the approval of his parents, he left home in search of a teacher to help him on his spiritual path. At fifteen, he took refuge with the Three Jewels under Venerable High Master Changzhi of Sanyuan Monastery in Harbin. He also drew near the Abbot, Venerable High Master Changren.

After finding his spiritual teacher, Hsuan Hua then enrolled into a private village school on the twelfth day of the third lunar month of the year of rénshēn (Water Monkey), or April 16, 1932, and attended until the thirteenth day of the eighth lunar month, or September 13. This was his first experience of formal education. Studying with single-minded concentration, he was able to memorize texts after only one reading, using his photographic memory. He became well versed in the Sixth Patriarch's Dharma Jewel Platform Sutra, the Diamond Sutra, the Amitabha Sutra, and other Buddhist texts, and by the age of sixteen began lecturing on these to his fellow villagers, many of whom were illiterate. As a student and a practitioner, he was a part of many charity organizations such as the Buddhist Association, the Moral Society of Manchuria, the Charity Society, and various organizations encouraging people to quit smoking and drinking. His main goal was to help teach people to refrain from all evil, and practice all good. In two more years of study, he mastered the core texts of Confucianism, the Four Books and Five Classics, along with those of other various Chinese schools of thought, and studied traditional Chinese medicine, astrology, divination, physiognomy, and the scriptures of other great religions. At age seventeen, Hsuan Hua understood from first-hand experience the hardships that came with not having a complete education, and he decided to establish a free school to teach thirty impoverished children and adults, with himself as the only teacher and faculty member. At age eighteen, he quit school in order to take care of his ill mother.

At nineteen years of age, Hsuan Hua finally became a monastic, under the Dharma name An Tzu (安慈).

== Bringing Buddhism to the United States ==
In 1959, Hsuan Hua sought to bring Chinese Buddhism to the West. He instructed his disciples in America to establish a Buddhist association, which later developed into the Dharma Realm Buddhist Association (formerly The Buddhist Lecture Hall and the Sino-American Buddhist Association).

He traveled to Australia in 1961 and taught there for one year, before returning to Hong Kong in 1962. That same year, at the invitation of American Buddhists, he traveled to the United States. His intent was to "come to America to create Patriarchs, to create Buddhas, to create Bodhisattvas".

Hsuan Hua then resided in San Francisco, where he built a lecture hall. He began to attract young Americans who were interested in meditation, and conducted daily meditation sessions and frequent Sutra lectures. During this time, the Cuban Missile Crisis occurred between the United States and the Soviet Union, and Hsuan Hua embarked on a thirty-five-day fasting period to pray for an end to the hostilities, and for world peace. In 1967, he moved the Buddhist Lecture Hall back to Chinatown, in the Tianhou Temple.

In 1968, Hsuan Hua held a Shurangama Study and Practice Summer Session. Over thirty students from the University of Washington in Seattle attended. After the session was concluded, five young Americans (Bhikṣus Heng Chyan, Heng Jing, and Heng Shou, and Bhikṣuṇīs Heng Yin and Heng Ch'ih) requested permission to take full ordination. Hsuan Hua lectured on the entire Śūraṅgama Sūtra in 1968 while he was in the United States. These lectures were recorded in an eight-part series of books containing the sutra and a traditionally rigorous form of commentary that addresses each passage. It was again lectured on by the original translator monks and nuns of the City of Ten Thousand Buddhas at Dharma Realm Buddhist University in the summer of 2003.

With the founding of his American sangha, Hsuan Hua established his personal vision for Buddhism in the United States:

- To bring the true and proper teachings of the Buddha to the West and establish a proper monastic community of the fully ordained sangha there
- To organize and support the translation of the entire Buddhist canon into English and other Western languages
- And to promote wholesome education through the establishment of schools and universities

Hsuan Hua wrote and lectured on Mahayana sutras throughout his teaching career in the West, including on the Heart Sutra, Diamond Sutra, Lotus Sutra, Amitabha Sutra, Avatamsaka Sutra, and Shurangama Sutra. He also founded the Buddhist Text Translation Society in 1970. Since its founding, the BTTS has translated and published numerous Mahayana sutras, as well as various editions of Master Hua's commentaries. These publications include multi-volume commentaries on the Lotus Sutra, Shurangama Sutra and Amitabha Sutra, which served to provide traditional Chinese Buddhist teachings on these sutras never before available in English.

Because of the increasing numbers of people who wished to become monks and nuns under Hsuan Hua's guidance, in 1972 he decided to hold ordination ceremonies at Gold Mountain Dhyana Monastery. Two monks and one nun received ordination. Subsequent ordination platforms have been held at the City of Ten Thousand Buddhas in 1976, 1979, 1982, 1989, 1991, and 1992, and progressively larger numbers of people have received full ordination. Over two hundred people from countries all over the world were ordained under him.

=== Theravada and Mahayana traditions ===
After traveling to Thailand and Burma in his youth to investigate Theravada Buddhism, Hsuan Hua developed a desire to bridge what he perceived as a rift between what he called the Northern (Mahayana) and Southern (Theravada) traditions. In an address to Ajahn Sumedho and the monastic community at Amaravati Buddhist Monastery on October 6, 1990, Hsuan Hua stated:

In Buddhism, we should unite the Southern and Northern traditions. From now on, we won't refer to Mahayana or Theravada. Mahayana is the "Northern Tradition" and Theravada is the "Southern Tradition." [...] Both the Southern and the Northern Traditions' members are disciples of the Buddha, we are the Buddha's descendants. As such, we should do what Buddhists ought to do. [...] No matter the Southern or the Northern Tradition, both share the common purpose of helping living beings bring forth the Bodhi-mind, to put an end to birth and death, and to leave suffering and attain bliss.

On the occasion of the opening ceremony for the Dharma Realm Buddhist University, Hsuan Hua presented K. Sri Dhammananda of the Theravada tradition with an honorary Ph.D. He also donated a major piece of the land that would become Abhayagiri Buddhist Monastery, a Theravada Buddhist monastery in the Thai Forest tradition of Ajahn Chah, located in Redwood Valley, California. Hsuan Hua invited Bhikkhus from both traditions to jointly conduct the High Ordination.

=== Chinese and American Buddhism ===
From July 18th to the 24th of 1987, Hsuan Hua hosted the Water, Land, and Air Repentance Dharma Assembly, a centuries-old ritual often seen as the "king of dharma services" in Chinese Buddhism, at the City of Ten Thousand Buddhas. Over seventy Buddhists from mainland China were invited to attend. This was the first time the service was known to have been held in North America. On November 6, 1990, Hsuan Hua sent his disciples to Beijing to bring the Dragon Treasury (Chinese: 龍藏; pinyin: lóngzáng) edition of the Chinese Buddhist canon back to the City of Ten Thousand Buddhas, furthering his goal of bringing Buddhism to the US.

== Death ==
On June 7, 1995, during a visit to Long Beach Sagely Monastery, Hsuan Hua died in his sleep. He had been ill for some time prior to his death at the age of 77. His parting words were

"I came from empty space, and I will also return to empty space,"

— Master Hua

Hsuan Hua's funeral lasted from June 8th to July 29th. On June 17th, Hsuan Hua's body was placed in a refrigerated casket and taken from southern to northern California, returning to the City of Ten Thousand Buddhas to lie in repose. All major services during the funeral were presided over by Ming Yang, abbot of Longhua Temple in Shanghai and a longtime friend of Hsuan Hua's.

On July 28, monks from both Theravada and Mahayana traditions hosted a memorial ceremony and cremation. More than two thousand followers from the United States, Canada, and various Asian and European countries came to the City of Ten Thousand Buddhas to take part in the service. Letters of condolence from dignitaries including former president George H. W. Bush were read during the ceremony.

A day after the cremation, on July 29th, Hsuan Hua's ashes were scattered, at his request, from a hot air balloon in the open air above the City of Ten Thousand Buddhas by his original two disciples, Heng Sure and Heng Chau. After the funeral, memorial services commemorating Hsuan Hua's life were held in various parts of the world, including Taiwan, China, and Canada. His śarīra (relics) were then distributed to many of his temples, disciples, and followers.

=== In Memory ===
Wanting to keep the memory of Hsuan Hua alive, a project by Dharma Realm Buddhist Association (DRBA) called Dharma Radio was started by his followers, with the wish that Master Hua's teachings remain accessible.

A YouTube series called Master Hua's Oral History Project (宣化上人口述歷史影集) where many of the early disciples discuss fond memories of the Master, was also established.

== See also ==
- Buddhism in the United States
- Timeline of Zen Buddhism in the United States
- Buddhism in the West
