= Joe McDoakes =

American short film comedy series

- Directed by: Richard Bare
- Written by: George O'Hanlon; Various
- Screenplay by: Richard L. Bare
- Produced by: Richard Bare; Gordon Hollingshead; Cedric Francis
- Starring: George O'Hanlon; Jane Harker; Phyllis Coates; Jane Frazee; Rodney Bell; Fred Kelsey; Ted Stanhope; Clifton Young; Del Moore
- Narrated by: Art Gilmore; Knox Manning
- Cinematography: Ellsworth Fredericks; Edwin B. DuPar; Ted McCord; Carl Guthrie; Gilbert Warrenton; William Sickner; Fred Gately; Ted Keefer
- Edited by: Rex Steele; Louis Hesse; Leo Shreve; Robert Warwick, Jr.
- Music by: William Lava
- Production company: Richard L. Bare Productions
- Distributed by: Warner Bros. Pictures; The Vitaphone Corporation
- Running time: 10 minutes (per short)
- Country: United States
- Language: English

Joe McDoakes is an American short-film comedy series produced and directed by Richard L. Bare for Warner Bros. A total of 63 black-and-white, live-action, one-reel films were produced and released between 1942 and 1956. The Joe McDoakes shorts are also known as the Behind the Eight Ball series (for the large eight ball Joe appeared behind in the opening credits) or the So You Want... series (as the film titles began with this phrase). The character's name derives from Joe Doakes, which was a popular American slang term for the average man.

The theme song of the series is "I Know That You Know" by Vincent Youmans from his Broadway musical Oh, Please! (1926), used later in the MGM musical Hit the Deck (1955).

George O'Hanlon, who would later provide the voice of George Jetson in Hanna-Barbera's animated sitcom The Jetsons, starred as the series' title character, Joe McDoakes. These one-reel shorts were written by Bare and O'Hanlon, although Bare usually received sole screen credit as the writer. Art Gilmore served as the narrator through 1948. Gordon Hollingshead, who won five Academy Awards for producing other short subjects for Warner Bros., was also credited as a producer on the series until his death in 1952, although his role on this series was primarily as liaison between the studio and the director.

== History ==
The series began with So You Want to Give Up Smoking, produced by Bare to teach his students at the University of Southern California the fundamentals of filmmaking. It was acquired by Warner Bros. for $2,500 and became the first of a series of short subjects. Only one more short was produced before World War II caused the suspension of the series, but production resumed in 1945 with So You Think You're Allergic.

These first three shorts were filmed silent, with narration added in post-production in the manner of the popular Pete Smith shorts produced at MGM from 1931 to 1955. They also resembled the Smith shorts in their focus on actual, everyday problems (such as smoking cessation, eye care, and coping with allergies) in an instructional but humorous way.

In 1946, the series began using live sound recording, and the addition of dialogue afforded the films a new dimension. The action was now played strictly for laughs, with many familiar character actors such as Fritz Feld, Ralph Sanford, Philip Van Zandt, Fred Kelsey and Leo White frequently appearing. Semi-regulars included Clifton Young (later Del Moore or Jackson Wheeler) as Joe's loudmouthed pal Homer, Rodney Bell as slow-witted neighbor Marvin, and Ted Stanhope as an all-purpose authority figure. Many of the shorts are domestic comedies in which McDoakes persists in some sort of endeavor, with often disastrous consequences.

Warner Bros. contract player Jane Harker co-starred as Joe's wife Alice in eight comedies, beginning with So You Want to Play the Horses in 1946 and ending with So You Want to Build a House in 1948. Screen newcomer Phyllis Coates assumed the role of Alice in So You Want to Be in Politics. Coates had married Bare that same year, and the working relationship would survive their later divorce. Former singing star Jane Frazee assumed the role beginning with So You Want to Be Your Own Boss (1954), but Coates returned in 1956 for the last three installments. While the Alice character appeared in most of the shorts, the actresses playing the role were not credited. In several of the films, Alice does not appear, and in some, Joe is a bachelor, as there is no continuity between installments.

In the late 1940s, the series won three consecutive Academy Award nominations in the category of Best Short Subject, One-reel for So You Want to Be in Pictures (1947), So You Want to Be on the Radio (1948) and So You Think You're Not Guilty (1949). For most of the series' run, the shorts were the only live-action comedies offered in 10-minute length, making them attractive for theater owners to include in their programs. The series ran until 1956, when the decline of the studio system brought an end to the production of short subjects by Warner Bros. and most of the other Hollywood studios.

== Cast and crew ==
Appearance credits for uncredited actors may be incomplete or incorrect because of inaccurate sources.

=== Billed cast and crew ===
- George O'Hanlon - Joe McDoakes
- Art Gilmore - Narrator (1942, 1946–1950)
- Knox Manning - Narrator (1945)
- Richard Bare - Director/Producer
- Gordon Hollingshead - Producer (1942-1953)
- Cedric Francis - Producer (1953–1956)

=== Alice McDoakes ===
- Jane Harker (1946–1948)
- Phyllis Coates (1948–1953, 1956)
- Jane Frazee (1954–1955)

=== Homer Hotbox, Joe's office buddy ===
- Clifton Young (1946–1949)
- Del Moore (1953–1955)
- Jackson Wheeler (1952, 1955)

=== Character actors with 10 or more appearances ===
- Rodney Bell
- Fred Kelsey
- Ted Stanhope

=== Guest cast notable for other roles ===
- Arthur Q. Bryan, the voice of Elmer Fudd, appeared in So You Want a Model Railroad and So You Want to Be a Paper Hanger and substituted for Art Gilmore as the narrator in So You Want to Be a Policeman.
- George Chandler and Ronald Reagan, both future presidents of the Screen Actors Guild (SAG), appeared in the same short, So You Want to Be in Pictures.
- Iron Eyes Cody offered a "scalp" treatment to Joe in So You Want to Keep Your Hair.
- The screen duo of Doris Day and Gordon MacRae had a cameo in So You Want a Television Set.
- Charlie Hall, who served as the foil in many Laurel and Hardy shorts, made his last screen appearance in So You Want to Play the Piano.
- Lyle Talbot, a founding member of SAG, appeared in So You Want to Be Your Own Boss.
- Frank Nelson, frequent guest star on The Jack Benny Program and I Love Lucy, appeared in So You're Going to Have an Operation, So You Want to Be an Actor and So You Want to Know Your Relatives.

== Shorts ==
Title	Approximate production date	Release date	Notes including key co-stars with George O'Hanlon
So You Want to Give Up Smoking	Early 1942	November 14, 1942	Art Gilmore (narrator)
So You Think You Need Glasses	Early 1942	December 26, 1942	Art Gilmore (narrator)
So You Think You're Allergic	June 1945	December 1, 1945	Knox Manning (narrator), Barbara Billingsley (cameo)
So You Want to Play the Horses	June 1946	October 5, 1946	Art Gilmore (narrator), Jane Harker, Richard Erdman, Leo White, Clifton Young, Fred Kelsey
So You Want to Keep Your Hair	April 1946	December 7, 1946	Art Gilmore (narrator), Leo White, Fred Kelsey, Iron Eyes Cody, Buster Brodie
So You Think You're a Nervous Wreck	September 1946	December 28, 1946	Art Gilmore (narrator), Clifton Young, Fred Kelsey, Howard M. Mitchell, Ted Stanhope
So You're Going to Be a Father	December 1946	May 10, 1947	Art Gilmore (narrator), Jane Harker, Fred Kelsey, Leo White, Emmett Vogan
So You Want to Be in Pictures	December 1946	June 7, 1947	Art Gilmore (narrator), George Chandler, Clyde Cook, Ralph Sanford, Jack Carson, Ronald Reagan, Wayne Morris, Janis Paige. Nominee for Academy Award for Best Live Action Short Film.
So You're Going on a Vacation	December 1946	July 5, 1947	Art Gilmore (narrator), Jane Harker, Ted Stanhope, Lennie Bremen, Clifton Young
So You Want to Be a Salesman	February 1947	September 13, 1947	Art Gilmore (narrator), Jane Harker, Lennie Bremen, Ted Stanhope, Rose Plumer, Lottie Williams
So You Want to Hold Your Wife	June 1947	November 22, 1947	Art Gilmore (narrator), Jane Harker, Ted Stanhope
So You Want an Apartment	July 1947	January 3, 1948	Art Gilmore (narrator), Jane Harker, Ted Stanhope, Clifton Young, Fred Kelsey
So You Want to Be a Gambler	August 1947	February 14, 1948	Art Gilmore (narrator), Clifton Young, Douglas Fowley, Leo White
So You Want to Build a House	June 1947	May 15, 1948	Art Gilmore (narrator), Jane Harker, Clifton Young, Fred Kelsey, Ralph Peters, Donald Kerr, Ralph Littlefield
So You Want to Be a Detective	September 1947	June 26, 1948	Art Gilmore (narrator), Lila Leeds, Clifton Young, George Magrill, Olaf Hytten, Fred Kelsey, Howard Mitchell, Charles Horvath, Philo McCullough, Charles Marsh, Donald Kerr, Kit Guard
So You Want to Be in Politics	July 1948	October 2, 1948	Phyllis Coates, Clifton Young, Fred Kelsey
So You Want to Be on the Radio	July 1948	November 6, 1948	Phyllis Coates, Clifton Young, Fred Kelsey, Ted Stanhope, Leo White, Jack Lomas. Nominee for Academy Award for Best Live Action Short Film.
So You Want to Be a Baby Sitter	March 1948	January 8, 1949	Art Gilmore (narrator), Phyllis Coates, Clifton Young, Billy Gray
So You Want to Be Popular	December 1948	March 12, 1949	Art Gilmore (narrator), Phyllis Coates, Clifton Young, Creighton Hale, Ted Stanhope, Leo White
So You Want to Be a Muscle Man	March 1949	July 2, 1949	Phyllis Coates, Clarence Ross, Willard Waterman
So You're Having In-Law Trouble	April–May 1949	August 27, 1949	Phyllis Coates, Clifton Young, Willard Waterman
So You Want to Get Rich Quick	August 1949	October 28, 1949	Phyllis Coates, Fred Clark, Joe Turkel, Frank Nelson
So You Want to Be an Actor	August 1949	December 3, 1949	Art Gilmore (narrator), Fred Clark, Fred Kelsey, Frank Nelson, Ralph Sanford, Clifton Young, Ted Stanhope, Dorothy Vaughan
So You Think You're Not Guilty	October 1949	December 21, 1949 (preview) April 7, 1950 (release)	Phyllis Coates, Ralph Sanford, Ted Stanhope, Fred Kelsey, Willard Waterman. Nominee for Academy Award for Best Live Action Short Film.
So You Want to Throw a Party	October 1949	February 4, 1950	Phyllis Coates, Billy Curtis, Willard Waterman, Ted Stanhope, Fred Kelsey, Jack Lomas, Edward Gargan
So You Want to Hold Your Husband	May 1950	July 1, 1950	Phyllis Coates, Ted Stanhope, Fred Kelsey, Monte Blue, Art Gilmore
So You Want to Move	May 1950	August 19, 1950	Phyllis Coates, Rodney Bell, Ralph Sanford, Charles Sullivan
So You Want a Raise	July 1950	September 23, 1950	Phyllis Coates, Willard Waterman, Margie Liszt, Edward Gargan, Fred Kelsey
So You're Going to Have an Operation	July 1950	December 2, 1950	Fritz Feld, Ted Stanhope, Frank Nelson
So You Want to Be a Handy Man	July 1950	January 3, 1951	Rodney Bell
So You Want to Be a Cowboy	November 1950	April 14, 1951	Phyllis Coates, Paul Newlan, Ted Stanhope, Eddie Gribbon, Harry Wilson
So You Want to Be a Paper Hanger	December 1950	June 2, 1951	Phyllis Coates, Rodney Bell, Arthur Q. Bryan, Anne O’Neal
So You Want to Buy a Used Car	December 1950	July 28, 1951	Phyllis Coates, Fred Kelsey, Bob Jellison
So You Want to Be a Bachelor	June 1951	September 22, 1951	Phyllis Coates, Ted Stanhope, Chester Clute, Jack Rice, Fred Kelsey
So You Want to Be a Plumber	July 1951	November 10, 1951	Phyllis Coates, Rodney Bell
So You Want to Get It Wholesale	July 1951	January 12, 1952	Phyllis Coates, Rodney Bell, Frank Nelson, Ted Stanhope, Charles Sullivan, Jack Mower, George Pembroke
So You Want to Enjoy Life	January 1952	March 29, 1952	Fritz Feld, Arthur Q. Bryan, Jackson Wheeler, Emory Parnell
So You Want to Go to a Convention	January 1952	June 7, 1952	Phyllis Coates, Connie Cezan
So You Never Tell a Lie	January 1952	August 2, 1952	Phyllis Coates, Rodney Bell, Emory Parnell, Jack Mower, Anne O’Neal
So You're Going to the Dentist	July 1952	September 20, 1952	Rodney Bell, Frank Nelson
So You Want to Wear the Pants	July 1952	November 8, 1952	Phyllis Coates, Fritz Feld
So You Want to Be a Musician	August 1952	December 14, 1952	Maurice Cass, Philip Van Zandt, Fred Kelsey, Chester Conklin, Paul Maxey, Fritz Feld
So You Want to Learn to Dance	December 1952	March 28, 1953	Emory Parnell, Jack Mower, Creighton Hale, Jesslyn Fax
So You Want a Television Set	December 1952	May 23, 1953	Phyllis Coates, Rodney Bell, Philip Van Zandt, Fred Kelsey, Doris Day, Gordon MacRae
So You Love Your Dog	December 1952	August 1, 1953	Phyllis Coates
So You Think You Can't Sleep	August 1953	October 31, 1953	Phyllis Coates, Ted Stanhope, Fred Kelsey
So You Want to Be an Heir	August 1953	December 19, 1953	Phyllis Coates, Philip Van Zandt
So You're Having Neighbor Trouble	November 1953	December 26, 1953	Phyllis Coates, Rodney Bell, Arthur Q. Bryan
So You Want to Be Your Own Boss	December 1953	March 13, 1954	Jane Frazee, Rodney Bell, Phil Arnold, Fred Kelsey, Lyle Talbot
So You Want to Go to a Night Club	December 1953	May 1, 1954	Jane Frazee, Philip Van Zandt, Del Moore, Joi Lansing, Jack Chefe, Ralph Brooks
So You Want to Be a Banker	April 1954	July 3, 1954	Snub Pollard, Fred Kelsey
So You're Taking in a Roomer	August 1954	October 30, 1954	Jane Frazee, Rodney Bell, Joi Lansing, Fred Kelsey, Herb Vigran
So You Want to Know Your Relatives	September 1954	December 18, 1954	Jane Frazee, Frank Nelson, Emory Parnell, Herb Vigran, Iris Adrian
So You Don't Trust Your Wife	September 1954	January 29, 1955	Jane Frazee, Fred Kelsey
So You Want to Be a Gladiator	December 1954	March 12, 1955	Jane Frazee, Del Moore, Philip Van Zandt, John Doucette
So You Want to Be on a Jury	December 1954	May 7, 1955	Jackson Wheeler, Phil Arnold, Arthur Q. Bryan, Philip Van Zandt
So You Want a Model Railroad	December 1954	August 27, 1955	Jane Frazee, Ted Stanhope, Anne O’Neal, Arthur Q. Bryan
So You Want to Be a V.P.	September 1955	October 29, 1955	Emory Parnell, Del Moore, Joi Lansing, Minerva Urecal, Philip Van Zandt
So You Want to Be a Policeman	October 1955	December 17, 1955	Arthur Q. Bryan, Joi Lansing, Sandy Sanders
So You Think the Grass Is Greener	October 1955	January 28, 1956	Jane Frazee, Joi Lansing, Emory Parnell, Del Moore
So You Want to Be Pretty	December 1955	March 10, 1956	Phyllis Coates, Fritz Feld, Iris Adrian
So You Want to Play the Piano	December 1955	May 5, 1956	Phyllis Coates, Ralph Sanford, Lester Dorr, Charlie Hall
So Your Wife Wants to Work	December 1955	July 14, 1956	Phyllis Coates, Emory Parnell, Lester Dorr

== Home video availability ==
Warner Archive Collection has released the entire series of 63 shorts in DVD-R format as The Joe McDoakes Collection. Individual shorts also appear as extras on DVD and Blu-ray discs of some Warner Bros. films of the period:

- So You Want to Give Up Smoking is on the DVD of All Through the Night
- So You Think You Need Glasses is on the DVD of The Man Who Came to Dinner
- So You Think You're Allergic is on the DVD of Objective, Burma!
- So You Think You're a Nervous Wreck is on the DVD of A Night in Casablanca
- So You Want to Be in Pictures is on the DVD of The Hasty Heart
- So You Want to Be a Detective is on the DVD and Blu-ray of The Treasure of the Sierra Madre
- So You Want to Be on the Radio is on the DVD and Blu-ray of Adventures of Don Juan
- So You Want to Be an Actor is on the DVD and Blu-ray of My Dream Is Yours
- So You Think You're Not Guilty is on the DVD and Blu-ray of White Heat
- So You Want to Hold Your Husband is on the DVD of Tea for Two
- So You Want to Move is on the DVD of Rocky Mountain
- So You Want a Raise is on the DVD of Montana
- So You're Going to Have an Operation is on the DVD of The Flame and the Arrow
- So You Want to Be a Paper Hanger is on the DVD of Jim Thorpe — All-American
- So You Want to Be a Bachelor is on the DVD of Starlift
- So You Want to Enjoy Life is on the DVD of Big Jim McLain
- So You Want to Wear the Pants is on the DVD of April in Paris
- So You Want to Learn to Dance and So You Want a Television Set are on the DVD of By the Light of the Silvery Moon
- So You Love Your Dog is on the Blu-ray of Calamity Jane
- So You Think You Can't Sleep is on the DVD of Trouble Along the Way
- So You Want to Be an Heir is on the DVD of South Sea Woman
- So You Want to Know Your Relatives is on the DVD of His Majesty O'Keefe
- So Your Wife Wants to Work is on the DVD of The Spirit of St. Louis

== See also ==
- List of live-action short subject series by Hollywood studios § Warner Bros.
