= List of Dragnet (1951 TV series) episodes =

This is an episode list for the 1951 American television crime drama series Dragnet. The series pilot premiered on NBC on December 14, 1951. A total of 276 episodes aired between December 14, 1951, and August 23, 1959. Dragnet was on both radio and television from December 1951 through February 1957. When the first Dragnet movie came out in September 1954, it was available on radio, TV and in the theatres for a while. Jack Webb directed all the episodes; James E. Moser, John Robinson and Frank Burt wrote the majority of the screenplays during the 8 season run of the show. Series star Jack Webb also wrote a handful of episodes, as did co-star Ben Alexander.

Barton Yarborough portrayed partner Sgt. Ben Romero in episodes 1 & 2. In episode 3, although announced as Sgt. Friday's partner, Romero does not appear, and Friday works with Sgt. Bill Cummings (portrayed by Ken Peters). After Yarborough's death on December 19, 1951, Friday's partner became Sgt. Ed Jacobs, portrayed by Barney Phillips, effective from episode #4 until the end of season one. For season two, Kenneth Patterson portrayed Officer Bill Lockwood in episode #15, after which Herb Ellis took the role of Officer Frank Smith. Ellis was replaced by Ben Alexander after five episodes, but because the shows didn't air in production order, Alexander's debut was episode #20, and Ellis' final appearance as Smith was episode #21. Alexander continued as Smith until the program's cancellation in 1959.

== Series overview ==
Season	Episodes	Originally released	
Season	Episodes	First released	Last released
1	14	December 14, 1951	June 20, 1952
2	33	September 12, 1952	June 26, 1953
3	39	September 4, 1953	May 28, 1954
4	39	August 27, 1954	May 27, 1955
5	39	September 2, 1955	June 1, 1956
6	34	September 24, 1956	May 23, 1957
7	39	September 26, 1957	June 26, 1958
8	39	September 23, 1958	August 23, 1959

== Episodes ==
=== Season 1 (1951–52) ===
No. overall	No. in season	Title	Directed by	Written by	Partner	Department	Original release date
1	1	"The Human Bomb"	Jack Webb	James E. Moser, Jack Webb	Ben Romero	Homicide	December 14, 1951
Friday and Romero deal with a man threatening to blow up city hall if he doesn't get his demands.: Cast: Raymond Burr, Jack Kruschen, Sam Edwards, Stacy Harris, Herb Butterfield.; The Human Bomb is available for free viewing and download at the Internet Archive
2	2	"The Big Actor"	Jack Webb	James E. Moser	Ben Romero	Narcotics	January 4, 1952
Friday and Romero track down a drug ring through a small-time television actor who is hooked on heroin.: The Big Actor is available for free viewing and download at the Internet Archive
3	3	"The Big Death"	Jack Webb	James E. Moser	Bill Cummings (Note: This was the only appearance of Bill Cummings as Joe's partner, portrayed by Ken Peters. This partner was not used in the radio drama.)	Homicide	January 18, 1952
Friday poses as a hired killer for a man who wants his wife dead.
4	4	"The Big Mother"	Jack Webb	James E. Moser	Ed Jacobs	Homicide	February 1, 1952
A newborn baby is stolen from a hospital nursery and the trail leads the police to a deranged mother.: The Big Mother is available for free viewing and download at the Internet Archive
5	5	"The Big Cast"	Jack Webb	James E. Moser	Ed Jacobs	Homicide	February 15, 1952
Friday and Jacobs track down a serial killer and get a confession over a meal with the suspect.: Cast: Lee Marvin.; The Big Cast is available for free viewing and download at the Internet Archive
6	6	"The Big Speech"	Jack Webb	Jack Webb	Ed Jacobs	Robbery	February 29, 1952
A doctor is beaten and robbed of prescription drugs.
7	7	"The Big Parrot"	Jack Webb	James E. Moser	Ed Jacobs	Homicide	March 14, 1952
A couple are robbed and murdered, along with their pet parrot. The killer uses a time bomb to start a fire and cover up his crime.
8	8	"The Big Moody"	Jack Webb	James E. Moser	Ed Jacobs	Homicide	March 28, 1952
Friday is assigned to investigate the murder of a rich man.
9	9	"The Big Blast"	Jack Webb	Jack Webb	Ed Jacobs	Homicide	April 11, 1952
A divorced mother is killed in bed by a shotgun while her young boy sleeps beside her.
10	10	"The Big Trial"	Jack Webb	James E. Moser	Ed Jacobs	Traffic: Accident Investigation; Hit and Run Felony Detail	April 25, 1952
Friday testifies at the trial of a man accused of a hit-and-run, but the main witness against him suddenly disappears.
11	11	"The Big September Man"	Jack Webb	James E. Moser	Ed Jacobs	Homicide	May 9, 1952
Someone murdered a secretary late at night in her office. She was beaten to death with a metal pipe wrapped in newspaper. Could it be the drunk found three blocks away beating his head against a wall?: The Big September Man is available for free viewing and download at the Internet Archive
12	12	"The Big Phone Call"	Jack Webb	Jack Webb	Ed Jacobs	Robbery	May 23, 1952
Friday and Jacobs interrogate a jewelry store owner about the theft of $20,000 worth of precious gems. The suspect repeatedly tries calling his wife but keeps getting a busy signal because his wife is constantly talking on the phone.: Cast: Vic Perrin.; Note: this episode has only 3 actors and the entire show is filmed on one set.; The Big Phone Call is available for free viewing and download at the Internet Archive
13	13	"The Big Casing"	Jack Webb	Jack Webb	Ed Jacobs	Homicide	June 6, 1952
Friday and Jacobs are called to the apartment of a man who phoned in the fatal shooting of his wife. The husband claims it was suicide, but upon looking at the crime scene and talking to neighbors Friday and Jacobs begin to wonder if it was murder.: The Big Casing is available for free viewing and download at the Internet Archive
14	14	"The Big Lamp"	Jack Webb	James E. Moser	Ed Jacobs	Burglary	June 20, 1952
Friday and Jacobs are out to catch a safe burglar who has been on the loose for seven months.: The Big Lamp is available for free viewing and download at the Internet Archive

=== Season 2 (1952–53) ===
No. overall	No. in season	Title	Directed by	Written by	Partner	Department	Original release date
15	1	"The Big Jump"	Jack Webb	James E. Moser	Bill Lockwood† (Note: This was Bill Lockwood's only appearance in the television show, portrayed by Ken Patterson. The character appeared in four episodes of the radio drama, portrayed by Martin Milner and Ken Peters.)	Homicide	September 12, 1952
A man stands upon the ledge of a tall building and threatens to jump to his death below. † Unlike every other episode of Dragnet, Friday never explicitly identifies his partner in this episode's opening narration. Friday is called to the scene alone, and arrives alone. Bill Lockwood (played by Kenneth Patterson) is one of the police officers already on the scene, and Friday proceeds to work with him and others.
16	2	"The Big Sorrow"	Jack Webb	James E. Moser	Frank Smith (Note: Herb Ellis and Ben Alexander were the only actors to portray Frank Smith in the television series, but in the radio drama Harry Bartell, Vic Perrin, and Ken Patterson also portrayed him. Herb Ellis portrayed Frank in episodes 16-19, and 21. Ben Alexander was Frank for episode 20 (aired out of order) and from episode 22 onwards.)	Robbery	September 26, 1952
Friday must cope with the sudden death of his partner, Ben Romero, as he and his new partner track a pair of escaped convicts.
17	3	"The Big Elevator"	Jack Webb	James E. Moser	Frank Smith	Homicide	October 10, 1952
Friday and Smith search for the person who left a dead woman in a hospital elevator.
18	4	"The Big Seventeen"	Jack Webb	James E. Moser	Frank Smith	Juvenile	November 7, 1952
When several teenagers ransack a movie theater Friday discovers they were set off by overdosing on drugs and that a high school student selling the stuff recently robbed a dealer with stuff that will kill him.: Cast: Herb Ellis, Allene Roberts, Herb Vigran; The Big Seventeen is available for free viewing and download at the Internet Archive
19	5	"The Big Trio"	Jack Webb	James E. Moser	Frank Smith	Traffic: Accident Investigation (Hit and Run Felony Detail)	November 21, 1952
Friday and Smith investigate three traffic accidents in one night.
20	6	"The Big Imposter"	Jack Webb	James E. Moser	Frank Smith	Juvenile	December 5, 1952
A missing young boy is found and returned to his grandfather, but the case gets complicated when the grandfather suspects that the boy is not his own grandson.
21	7	"The Big .22 Rifle For Christmas"	Jack Webb	James E. Moser, Jack Webb	Frank Smith	Homicide	December 19, 1952
Friday and Smith search for a missing boy. The first sign that the case is serious is when blood is found. Further probing reveals the boy's parents had purchased him a .22-caliber rifle for Christmas — and the weapon is missing, removed from its wrapped package.: The Big .22 Rifle For Christmas is available for free viewing and download at the Internet Archive
22	8	"The Big Cop"	Jack Webb	James E. Moser	Frank Smith	Unknown	January 2, 1953
Friday has to catch a bad cop who has been dealing with the mob.
23	9	"The Big Grandma"	Jack Webb	James E. Moser	Frank Smith	Forgery	January 9, 1953
Friday and Jacobs look for an elderly woman who has been passing bad checks just three different months a year for nearly 10 years. * The Big Grandma is available for free viewing and download at the Internet Archive
24	10	"The Big Whiff"	Jack Webb	James E. Moser	Frank Smith	Homicide	January 16, 1953
A woman is murdered when she is given an overdose of chloroform.
25	11	"The Big Show"	Jack Webb	James E. Moser	Frank Smith	Juvenile	January 23, 1953
A woman named Marjorie Lewis reports finding an abandoned baby at a bus terminal. Joe and Frank take the baby but as they investigate they find discrepancies in Lewis' story.: Cast Virginia Gregg, Clarence Cassell, Vivi Janiss; The Big Show is available for free viewing and download at the Internet Archive
26	12	"The Big Safe"	Jack Webb	James E. Moser	Frank Smith	Burglary	January 30, 1953
Friday and Smith are investigating a missing office safe.
27	13	"The Big Church"	Jack Webb	James E. Moser	Frank Smith	Homicide	February 6, 1953
A woman receives threatening letters from an unknown stalker.
28	14	"The Big Hate"	Jack Webb	James E. Moser	Frank Smith	Homicide	February 13, 1953
Gordon Miller, a young pianist, is found near an abandoned freight car holding the dead body of a woman in his arms. He claims he has killed her. Called to interrogate him, Friday and Smith remain skeptical.: The Big Hate is available for free viewing and download at the Internet Archive
29	15	"The Big Shakedown"	Jack Webb	James E. Moser	Frank Smith	Vice	February 20, 1953
Friday is looking for a crooked cop.
30	16	"The Big Rose"	Jack Webb	James E. Moser	Frank Smith	Homicide	February 27, 1953
Friday and Smith are looking for a missing woman that left her three children with her sister.
31	17	"The Big Building"	Jack Webb	James E. Moser	Frank Smith	Homicide	March 6, 1953
A prominent dentist denies that his wife is missing, but Friday and Smith can find no trace of her.
32	18	"The Big Run"	Jack Webb	Jack Webb	Frank Smith	Traffic: Accident Investigation (Hit and Run Felony Detail)	March 13, 1953
Two elderly women are struck down by a hit-and-run driver.
33	19	"The Big Break"	Jack Webb	James E. Moser	Frank Smith	Robbery	March 20, 1953
Friday leads a team in a raid on the house of a very dangerous armed robber, which results in a bloody shootout.: The Big Break is available for free viewing and download at the Internet Archive
34	20	"The Big Light"	Jack Webb	John Robinson	Frank Smith	Homicide	March 27, 1953
Henry Wilson, a Hollywood movie director, has been killed by a falling arc light. Was it really an accident? To answer this question, Friday and Smith go Hollywood with a wonderful excuse to visit the studios. But the two men do not fail to mix business with pleasure and they will wind up solving the mystery.
35	21	"The Big Waiter"	Jack Webb	James E. Moser	Frank Smith	Homicide	April 3, 1953
An immigrant is brutally beaten to death and the trail may lead to the victim's abused wife.
36	22	"The Big Test"	Jack Webb	John Robinson	Frank Smith	Homicide	April 10, 1953
A young man reports that he was robbed by bandits on horseback while he was down in Mexico.
37	23	"The Big Lay-Out"	Jack Webb	John Robinson	Frank Smith	Narcotics	April 17, 1953
A friend of Friday's asks him for help when he discovers that his son has been using drugs, and may be selling them as well.
38	24	"The Big Fire"	Jack Webb	James E. Moser	Frank Smith	Homicide	April 24, 1953
A landlord begins threatening his tenants so he can force them to move out of his building.
39	25	"The Big Ray"	Jack Webb	John Robinson	Frank Smith	Homicide	May 1, 1953
A man suddenly becomes ill and dies after eating his dinner at home.
40	26	"The Big Frank"	Jack Webb	James E. Moser, Jack Webb	Frank Smith	Robbery	May 8, 1953
While investigating a routine robbery with Friday, Smith suffers a critical gunshot wound. Sergeant Friday is out for vengeance.: The Big Frank is available for free viewing and download at the Internet Archive
41	27	"The Big Lease"	Jack Webb	James E. Moser	Frank Smith	Homicide	May 15, 1953
An elderly widower is missing, so Friday and Smith retrace his actions before his disappearance. Things point to a long vacation until the story of Mrs. Banner, who rented the man's house, doesn't add up.: The Big Lease is available for free viewing and download at the Internet Archive
42	28	"The Big Hands"	Jack Webb	James E. Moser	Frank Smith	Homicide	May 22, 1953
In looking into a dead woman case, Friday and Smith track clues all around the city and find a strangler.: Cast: Olan Soule, Cliff Arquette, Tom McKee, Helen Kleeb, Jeanne Baird, Ted Bliss, Mel Ford.; The Big Hands is available for free viewing and download at the Internet Archive
43	29	"The Big Fourth"	Jack Webb	James E. Moser	Frank Smith	Juvenile	May 29, 1953
Several babies are stolen in the city.
44	30	"The Big Market"	Jack Webb	James E. Moser	Frank Smith	Robbery	June 5, 1953
The market bandit starts robbing people at local markets.
45	31	"The Big Friend"	Jack Webb	Jack Webb	Frank Smith	Homicide	June 12, 1953
Friday and Smith are torn between two suspects when a man reports that his wife has been strangled.
46	32	"The Big Barrette"	Jack Webb	James E. Moser, Jack Webb	Frank Smith	Homicide	June 19, 1953
Friday and Smith search for the brutal killer of a 21-year-old woman.: The Big Barrette is available for free viewing and download at the Internet Archive
47	33	"The Big Dance"	Jack Webb	James E. Moser, Jack Webb	Frank Smith	Robbery	June 26, 1953
Friday and Smith are looking for two thugs that seem to have disappeared from the city.: The Big Dance is available for free viewing and download at the Internet Archive

=== Season 3 (1953–54) ===
Friday's partner throughout this season is Officer Frank Smith.

No. overall	No. in season	Title	Directed by	Written by	Original release date
48	1	"The Big White Rat"	Jack Webb	Jack Webb, Ben Alexander, John Robinson	September 3, 1953
Friday and Smith investigate the report of a drug ring.
49	2	"The Big Revolt"	Jack Webb	Paul Coates	September 11, 1953
A woman reports her husband missing and Friday and Smith are assigned to find him.
50	3	"The Big Bull"	Jack Webb	John Robinson	September 18, 1953
Cast: Art Gilmore, John Gallaudet, Mary Dean Moss. Smith takes a personal interest when a strong-arm bandit threatens his family if he doesn't back off the case. Mary Dean Moss plays Fay, Frank's very seldom seen wife.
51	4	"The Big Betty"	Jack Webb	James E. Moser	September 25, 1953
Cast: Allene Roberts, Mel Ford, Robert Clarke, Gloria Saunders; Con artists sell junk disguised as valuable jewelry to relatives of recently deceased people by reading obituaries and posing as people contacted by their deceased relatives. Friday and Smith use information from a former con man gone straight to bust the gang. The Big Betty is available for free viewing and download at the Internet Archive
52	5	"The Big Sophomore"	Jack Webb	James E. Moser	October 2, 1953
A teenage boy steals food for his starving family.
53	6	"The Big Pill"	Jack Webb	John Robinson	October 9, 1953
Friday and Smith are on the trail of a gang that is robbing local drugstores.
54	7	"The Big Lie"	Jack Webb	John Robinson	October 16, 1953
55	8	"The Big Fake"	Jack Webb	James E. Moser	October 23, 1953
A police rookie is accused of assaulting a citizen and stealing his money.
56	9	"The Big Dream"	Jack Webb	John Robinson	October 30, 1953
Friday and Smith investigate the murder of a girl who came to Los Angeles with a dream of being an actress.
57	10	"The Big Guilt"	Jack Webb	Ben Alexander, John Robinson	November 6, 1953
A man is found dead in an alley and it's up to Friday and Smith to find his killer and notify the man's wife.
58	11	"The Big Will"	Jack Webb	Ben Alexander, John Robinson	November 13, 1953
Friday and Smith investigate the murder of a rich man. The Big Will is available for free viewing and download at the Internet Archive
59	12	"The Big In-Laws"	Jack Webb	James E. Moser, Chan Hadlock	November 20, 1953
Friday and Smith try to capture a ring of truck hijackers.
60	13	"The Big Lilly"	Jack Webb	Ben Alexander, John Robinson, William Weiner	November 27, 1953
61	14	"The Big Kill"	Jack Webb	James E. Moser	December 4, 1953
A cop is gunned down at home by a vengeful ex-con. Friday must go undercover in prison to obtain a full confession.
62	15	"The Big Lover"	Jack Webb	James E. Moser	December 11, 1953
Friday and Smith investigate a con man that marries rich women just for their money.
63	16	"The Big Thief"	Jack Webb	Ben Alexander, John Robinson	December 18, 1953
Cast: Dororthy Abbott, Art Gilmore, Gloria Saunders; Robbers phone doctors for house calls then assault them and steal their drugs, and when they are cornered by Friday and Smith one opens fire and is shot to death by Friday, leaving him shaken to where his girlfriend Ann Baker must reassure him he was in the right. The Big Thief is available for free viewing and download at the Internet Archive
64	17	"The Big Little Jesus"	Jack Webb	Richard L. Breen	December 25, 1953
It's Christmas Eve when Father Rojas at the Old Mission Plaza Church in Los Angeles discovers that the statue of the Infant Jesus is stolen from the crib. The statue's worth is only a few dollars, but it is of great sentimental value for the parish. Friday and Smith promise to try to get it back before mass on Christmas Day, but this means that they have less than 24 hours to catch the thief. This episode underwent an almost word-for-word remake in the 1967 Dragnet series as The Christmas Story. The Big Little Jesus is available for free viewing and download at the Internet Archive
65	18	"The Big Eavesdrop"	Jack Webb	John Robinson	January 1, 1954
Friday and Smith overhear a suspicious conversation while on a coffee break in a diner.
66	19	"The Big Trunk"	Jack Webb	James E. Moser	January 8, 1954
Cast: Richard Garland, James Anderson; Three men are taken into custody for the murder of a former vaudeville actress who owned a large steamer trunk. The three men maintain innocence so they are left alone in a station office that is wired to pick up their conversations, though one of them suspects just that. The Big Trunk is available for free viewing and download at the Internet Archive
67	20	"The Big Youngster"	Jack Webb	James E. Moser	January 15, 1954
Friday and Smith catch a boy who has been vandalizing private property, but they discover that the boy's problems begin at home.
68	21	"The Big Boys"	Jack Webb	James E. Moser	January 22, 1954
Cast: Leonard Nimoy, Mel Ford, Harry Bartell; Friday, Smith, and Sergeant Tony Chavez get word that four armed toughs (two of them Army deserters) have been engaged in car thefts and other robberies in San Francisco and have made their way to LA; after determining they are staying at a cheap hotel Friday and Smith stake the place out, but must depend on a drunken desk clerk not to blow their cover. The Big Boys is available for free viewing and download at the Internet Archive
69	22	"The Big Ham"	Jack Webb	Ben Alexander, John Robinson	January 29, 1954
Cast: Ellen Corby, Robert Knapp; Friday and Smith investigate the death of a young girl that is initially ruled a suicide but turns out to be murder.
70	23	"The Big Chance"	Jack Webb	James E. Moser	February 5, 1954
Signs point to foul play when a highway patrolman disappears from his car along a deserted road.
71	24	"The Big Children"	Jack Webb	James E. Moser	February 12, 1954
Three children are found abandoned, filthy and starving. Friday and Smith charge the mother with neglect. The Big Children is available for free viewing and download at the Internet Archive
72	25	"The Big Poison"	Jack Webb	James E. Moser	February 19, 1954
An elderly couple suddenly disappears from a fashionable neighborhood.
73	26	"The Big Quack"	Jack Webb	Chan Hadlock	February 26, 1954
The victim of a so-called "mental therapist," a young woman commits suicide after being robbed of her furs and jewels. It is up to Friday and Smith to trace the man and to stop him from striking anymore.
74	27	"The Big Winchester"	Jack Webb	James E. Moser	March 5, 1954
An elderly man appears to have killed himself with a rifle, but the cops soon learn that it was no accident. The Big Winchester is available for free viewing and download at the Internet Archive
75	28	"The Big Shoplift"	Jack Webb	James E. Moser	March 12, 1954
There seems to be a lot of recent theft at retail stores in the city, and Friday and his partner are on the case. The detectives question a salesperson from a big department store downtown, and she denies any involvement. They talk to a woman who was at the bus station, who saw another woman leave a parcel which contained a fur coat. Eventually Friday talks to a teenage girl, who saw a woman discard boxes of new items in a vacant lot. The girl knows the woman's identity, and soon the officers are interrogating the shoplifter, a doctor's wife with a lot of time on her hands. The Big Shoplift is available for free viewing and download at the Internet Archive
76	29	"The Big Hit and Run Killer"	Jack Webb	James E. Moser	March 19, 1954
A truck kills an old lady and her little grandson at a crossing and drives away. The owner of the truck asserts that he let a man called Paul borrow the truck for one hour, but he doesn't know the last name of this man or where he lives. The police must investigate all circumstances, but should Friday and Smith squander resources to seek a man they hardly believe exists? (1st) The Big Hit and Run Killer is available for free viewing and download at the Internet Archive (2nd) The Big Hit and Run Killer is available for free viewing and download at the Internet Archive
77	30	"The Big Drink"	Jack Webb	James E. Moser	March 26, 1954
78	31	"The Big Girl"	Jack Webb	James E. Moser	April 2, 1954
The detectives try to track down a tall, beautiful woman who has been terrorizing the city by robbing men, beating them up and in some cases shooting them. Their job is made more difficult by the fact that there are many inconsistencies in the victims' reports. The Big Girl is available for free viewing and download at the Internet Archive
79	32	"The Big Mattress"	Jack Webb	James E. Moser	April 9, 1954
Friday and Smith investigate a corrupt cop.
80	33	"The Big Pug"	Jack Webb	James E. Moser	April 16, 1954
An elderly woman is badly beaten and robbed while on her way to the bank. The trail leads to an ex-prizefighter.
81	34	"The Big Frame"	Jack Webb	James E. Moser	April 23, 1954
A man is found dead in the gutter. At first it seems as a hit-run case, but Friday and Smith become suspicious when all witnesses from the night before give exactly the same story. Usually witnesses are at variance in some respects. The Big Frame is available for free viewing and download at the Internet Archive
82	35	"The Big Plant"	Jack Webb	James E. Moser	April 30, 1954
A woman disappears and her husband is the prime suspect, but Friday and Smith will have a hard time getting past his fierce guard dogs.
83	36	"The Big Check"	Jack Webb	James E. Moser	May 7, 1954
A check forger is victimizing small businessmen in a particular neighborhood.
84	37	"The Big Threat"	Jack Webb	James E. Moser	May 14, 1954
A man is beaten and robbed, then the thieves intimidate him and his family so he'll refuse to testify against them.
85	38	"The Big Dare"	Jack Webb	James E. Moser	May 21, 1954
A single mother is stabbed to death in her home. The list of suspects includes her teenage son and her many boyfriends.
86	39	"The Big False Make"	Jack Webb	John Robinson	May 28, 1954
Friday begins to question a local gardener, who has been arrested for holding up a grocery store. During the interrogation Friday begins to have strong doubts about the man's guilt, and sets out to discover why the man has confessed to a crime Friday believes he didn't commit. The Big False Make is available for free viewing and download at the Internet Archive

=== Season 4 (1954–55) ===
Friday's partner throughout this season is Officer Frank Smith.

No. overall	No. in season	Title	Directed by	Written by	Original release date
87	1	"The Big Producer"	Jack Webb	James E. Moser	August 27, 1954
Obscene literature and pictures are spread among youngster at a school in Los Angeles. The supplier of this illegal stuff turns out to be a former film producer from the days of silent movies. The Big Producer is available for free viewing and download at the Internet Archive
88	2	"The Big Fraud"	Jack Webb	John Robinson	September 3, 1954
A group of con artists are posing as cops and victimizing out-of-town businessmen in fashionable hotels. The Big Fraud is available for free viewing and download at the Internet Archive
89	3	"The Big Crime"	Jack Webb	James E. Moser	September 10, 1954
Four-year-old twin girls are abducted from the local park. The Big Crime is available for free viewing and download at the Internet Archive
90	4	"The Big Pair"	Jack Webb	James E. Moser	September 17, 1954
An old man and his granddaughter are burgled, leaving them broke and starving. The Big Pair is available for free viewing and download at the Internet Archive
91	5	"The Big Escape"	Jack Webb	James E. Moser	September 24, 1954
A case hits too close to home for Friday when his old army buddy robs a liquor store and shoots his partner. Friday believes his friend wants to go straight after doing time, but things get worse when his friend breaks jail.
92	6	"The Big Kid"	Jack Webb	John Robinson	October 1, 1954
When Friday and Smith learn that a showdown between two teenage gangs is about to take place within 48 hours, they do their utmost to prevent it. But for all their efforts a tragedy occurs: an 11-year-old boy is killed.
93	7	"The Big Missing"	Jack Webb	James E. Moser	October 8, 1954
Friday and Smith are looking for a missing businessman.
94	8	"The Big Bar"	Jack Webb	James E. Moser	October 15, 1954
A holdup man is sticking up bars. After he takes the money he kills many of his victims. Sergeant Friday has few leads other than that the holdup man likes a certain song on the jukebox. The Big Bar is available for free viewing and download at the Internet Archive
95	9	"The Big Present"	Jack Webb	John Robinson	October 22, 1954
Friday and Smith are looking for a burglar who leaves a milk bottle at the scene of the crime. They suspect a juvenile might be involved. The Big Present is available for free viewing and download at the Internet Archive
96	10	"The Big Gangster: Part 1"	Jack Webb	James E. Moser	October 29, 1954
An attempt is made on the life of a gang leader. Friday and Smith must find the shooters before his followers seek revenge.
97	11	"The Big Gangster: Part 2"	Jack Webb	James E. Moser	November 5, 1954
Friday and Smith must find the men who murdered a gang boss before an open gang war starts.
98	12	"The Big New Years"	Jack Webb	James E. Moser	November 12, 1954
On New Year's Eve, Friday and Smith are working out of Central Receiving Hospital. The Big New Years is available for free viewing and download at the Internet Archive
99	13	"The Big Want Ad"	Jack Webb	James E. Moser	November 19, 1954
Friday and Smith investigate a man who is conning people by using the want ads.
100	14	"The Big Affair"	Jack Webb	James E. Moser	November 26, 1954
Friday and Smith discover that the key to finding a hold-up artist lies in his married girlfriend.
101	15	"The Big Bible"	Jack Webb	John Robinson, Earl Schley	December 3, 1954
Cast: Lillian Powell, Marian Richman; The estranged husband of Nora Hamlin storms her mother's house threatening to kill himself, and is found dead. But when the case appears open and shut, examination of the death bullet shows it could not possibly be fired from the gun the man was holding, so Friday must reinterview the man's mother-in-law, who'd been reading The Bible when the man stormed into her house. NOTE: This episode was remade for Dragnet 1967...episode "The Bullet", aired May 11, 1967.
102	16	"The Big Bindle"	Jack Webb	John Robinson, Jack Webb	December 10, 1954
Friday goes under cover to bust a drug ring that is operating out of a high-class hotel.
103	17	"The Big Office"	Jack Webb	John Robinson	December 17, 1954
Friday and Smith are assigned to the business office, where they must deal with the paperwork on a busy weekend.
104	18	"The Big Rod"	Jack Webb	John Robinson	December 31, 1954
An expectant mother is run down and killed by a teenager in a hot rod. The Big Rod is available for free viewing and download at the Internet Archive
105	19	"The Big Rescue"	Jack Webb	John Robinson	January 7, 1955
A group of bandits arm themselves and break their comrades out of jail.
106	20	"The Big Family"	Jack Webb	John Robinson	January 14, 1955
CAST: Robert Knapp, Herb Butterfield, Sarah Selby, J.P. O'Donnell; Local businessman John Keith Jarrett disappears and evidence of suicide is discovered. Friday and Smith check on the surviving members of his family and find them not the least concerned about their father's death, with his son a tennis bum, his daughter promiscuous, and his wife drunken. The case gets even murkier when a report comes in of a traffic incident upstate involving a camper in which the driver was using Jarrett's license. The Big Family is available for free viewing and download at the Internet Archive
107	21	"The Big Shock"	Jack Webb	John Robinson	January 21, 1955
Friday and Smith go after a burglar who plans to break into a bank through a tunnel.
108	22	"The Big Screen"	Jack Webb	John Robinson	January 28, 1955
Friday and Smith team up with a newspaper reporter so they can investigate television repairmen who may be overcharging their customers.
109	23	"The Big TV"	Jack Webb	John Robinson	February 4, 1955
The detectives search for a missing mother and child at the behest of her mother-in-law, unaware that the girl's husband has died in action and is not overseas as the woman had claimed. The Big TV is available for free viewing and download at the Internet Archive (note: this episode is mislabeled as The Big Bounce at the Internet Archive.)
110	24	"The Big Dog"	Jack Webb	John Robinson	February 11, 1955
An old man sits on his front porch with a shotgun, threatening to kill the man who poisoned his dog.
111	25	"The Big Underground"	Jack Webb	John Robinson, Earl Schley	February 18, 1955
Friday and Smith use a stolen check as a lead to a series of used car lot robberies.
112	26	"The Big Key"	Jack Webb	John Robinson, Earl Schley	February 25, 1955
A woman's badly mutilated body is found in a churchyard on Christmas eve. The only clue is a key lying under her.
113	27	"The Big Mailman"	Jack Webb	John Robinson	March 4, 1955
Friday and Smith go after a bandit who is robbing mailboxes and then trying to cash other people's checks.
114	28	"The Big Customer"	Jack Webb	John Robinson	March 11, 1955
Friday and Smith investigate a man who is writing bad checks.
115	29	"The Big Tar Baby"	Jack Webb	John Robinson	March 18, 1955
A bartender's wife is kidnapped, beaten and rolled in hot tar.
116	30	"The Big Number"	Jack Webb	John Robinson	March 25, 1955
Friday and Smith Investigate a Bank Robbery. The suspect is found by a witness getting three numbers from his license plate.
117	31	"The Big Mask"	Jack Webb	John Robinson	April 1, 1955
A masked bandit is holding up supermarkets and the police are not able to catch him.
118	32	"The Big Sucker"	Jack Webb	John Robinson	April 8, 1955
A con artist is swindling jewelers using fake diamonds.
119	33	"The Big Mustache"	Jack Webb	John Robinson	April 15, 1955
Friday and Smith investigate the robbery of an appliance store.
120	34	"The Big Heel"	Jack Webb	John Robinson	April 22, 1955
Friday and Smith use an unusual footprint to help solve a murder case.
121	35	"The Big Gone"	Jack Webb	John Robinson, Earl Schley	April 29, 1955
The owner of a flower shop kills a man who is trying to rob him, but the corpse mysteriously vanishes.
122	36	"The Big Student"	Jack Webb	John Robinson	May 6, 1955
Friday and Smith are on the trail of a bunch of teenagers selling fake magazine subscriptions.
123	37	"The Big Watch"	Jack Webb	John Robinson	May 13, 1955
Friday and Smith investigate a man based on a tip from an informant.
124	38	"The Big Dig"	Jack Webb	John Robinson	May 20, 1955
Friday and Smith are looking into a report of a missing woman that turns into a murder investigation.
125	39	"The Big Mug"	Jack Webb	John Robinson	May 27, 1955
Two hold-up men are robbing and beating pedestrians in the downtown area.

=== Season 5 (1955–56) ===
Friday's partner throughout this season is Officer Frank Smith.

No. overall	No. in season	Title	Directed by	Written by	Original release date
126	1	"The Big Pipe"	Jack Webb	John Robinson	September 2, 1955
Friday and Smith investigate the murder of a young woman who was beaten to death with a lead pipe. A filmed remake of radio episode #4, "Who Killed Helen Corday".
127	2	"The Big Chet"	Jack Webb	John Robinson	September 9, 1955
128	3	"The Big No Rain"	Jack Webb	John Robinson	September 16, 1955
129	4	"The Big Lift"	Jack Webb	John Robinson	September 23, 1955
Sgt Friday and officer Smith struggle to crack a case involving a cat burglar. The Big Lift is available for free viewing and download at the Internet Archive
130	5	"The Big Confession"	Jack Webb	John Robinson	September 30, 1955
A man walks into the station and tells Friday that he wants to confess to a murder, but the cops have a hard time verifying his story.
131	6	"The Big Gap"	Jack Webb	Frank Burt	October 7, 1955
Cast Lillian Powell, Peggy Webber, James Stone, Red Barry, Mel Ford; A pawn shop owner alerts Friday and Smith when a man claimed to have purchased an expensive ring that turns out to be junk and then asked the pawn shop owner to sell him a gun. Friday and Smith find the man and learn he is the latest victim of two con artists, Ernest Wilcoxson and Parker Cleaver, who are now working with a third man named Norman Crist. But when Crist is found dead in a car accident, the two conmen cannot be prosecuted. The Big Gap is available for free viewing and download at the Internet Archive
132	7	"The Big Look"	Jack Webb	John Robinson	October 14, 1955
Friday and Smith are assigned to a case of a woman who was beaten outside her home. The Big Look is available for free viewing and download at the Internet Archive
133	8	"The Big Glasses"	Jack Webb	John Robinson	October 21, 1955
Cast Red Barry, Edward Keane; A housewife, Ella Ryburn reports to Friday and Smith that she cannot contact her mother, who is married to Alfred Rudolph Shroder. When he is questioned, Shroder claims his wife left him and that he sold their house and put her items in storage, but Friday and Smith do some more checking and find some discrepancies, then when they go to the house with Ella Ryburn they discover the basement ceiling contains blood. But it isn't until the two officers find a pair of glasses that they deduce what happened.
134	9	"The Big Bird"	Jack Webb	Frank Burt	October 28, 1955
Sgt. Friday investigates a robber who only targets pet stores and homes that have pet birds. The Big Bird is available for free viewing and download at the Internet Archive
135	10	"The Big Laugh"	Jack Webb	John Robinson	November 4, 1955
A con man makes lonely women fall for his charms, then steals their money and disappears.
136	11	"The Big Smoke"	Jack Webb	John Robinson	November 11, 1955
An invalid woman and her elderly father are brutally beaten, the father fatally, and the trail leads police to a former handyman.
137	12	"The Big Bounce"	Jack Webb	Frank Burt	November 18, 1955
Joe Friday searches for a check forger who has been using the name of the old-time movie villain Parker Allington, who died three years ago. The search takes him to a former extra who has given up show business for crime.
138	13	"The Big Shot"	Jack Webb	John Robinson	November 25, 1955
A night club owner is shot down and there are no witnesses to the crime.
139	14	"The Big Locker"	Jack Webb	John Robinson	December 2, 1955
Friday and Smith happen to catch a man trying to sell a stolen ring at a pawn shop.
140	15	"The Big Note"	Jack Webb	John Robinson	December 9, 1955
Friday and Smith receive an anonymous note that leads them to a group of neglected and drug-using teenagers.
141	16	"The Big Genius"	Jack Webb	Frank Burt	December 16, 1955
Friday and Smith investigate what seems to be the perfect crime.
142	17	"The Big Reminisce"	Jack Webb	Frank Burt	December 30, 1955
Friday and Smith talk about some of their past cases during a slow New Year's Eve shift.
143	18	"The Big Tour"	Jack Webb	John Robinson, Frank Burt	January 6, 1956
144	19	"The Big Sisters"	Jack Webb	Frank Burt	January 13, 1956
Friday and Smith are sent to investigate a burglary report filed by an elderly person, only to find out that the report is a fake.
145	20	"The Big Ruling"	Jack Webb	Frank Burt	January 20, 1956
146	21	"The Big Fall Guy"	Jack Webb	Frank Burt	January 27, 1956
Friday and Smith are on the trail of a robbery suspect that has robbed two stores.
147	22	"The Big Set"	Jack Webb	John Robinson	February 3, 1956
A city councilman is beaten to death outside a bar and it's up to Friday and Smith to find his killer.
148	23	"The Big Child"	Jack Webb	John Robinson	February 10, 1956
A report of a two-year-old child drinking bleach sends Friday and Smith on a hunt to find the mother for questioning.
149	24	"The Big Slug"	Jack Webb	Frank Burt	February 17, 1956
Friday and Smith investigate the fatal shooting of a liquor store owner.
150	25	"The Big Daughter"	Jack Webb	Frank Burt	February 24, 1956
Friday and Smith investigate a missing persons report.
151	26	"The Big No Suicide"	Jack Webb	Frank Burt	March 2, 1956
Friday gets a call from a former mental patient who is threatening to kill himself and his family.
152	27	"The Big Siege"	Jack Webb	John Robinson	March 9, 1956
Police find themselves in a stand-off when an armed bank robber takes a woman hostage in her home.
153	28	"The Big Mama"	Jack Webb	Frank Burt	March 16, 1956
154	29	"The Big Revision"	Jack Webb	John Robinson	March 23, 1956
Friday and Smith have a hard time getting a robbery suspect to confess to his crimes.
155	30	"The Big Ex-Blonde"	Jack Webb	Frank Burt	March 30, 1956
Friday goes undercover to catch brothers who steal people's money by posing as real-estate agents.
156	31	"The Big Bobo"	Jack Webb	John Robinson	April 6, 1956
A police officer is suspended from duty when he is accused of taking a bribe in exchange for a prisoner's release.
157	32	"The Big Rush"	Jack Webb	John Robinson	April 13, 1956
Friday and Smith start an investigation of two men who killed an off-duty policeman in a downtown Los Angeles bar.
158	33	"The Big Setup"	Jack Webb	John Robinson	April 20, 1956
An informant tips off police to a shipment of heroin coming into the country. Friday goes undercover to bust open the ring.
159	34	"The Big Deal"	Jack Webb	John Robinson	April 27, 1956
Friday and Smith are investigating a rash of car thefts. The stolen cars are being sold with forged pink slips. The Big Deal is available for free viewing and download at the Internet Archive
160	35	"The Big Wish"	Jack Webb	John Robinson, Frank Burt	May 4, 1956
A teenage boy turns himself in and confesses to being an addict, but he refuses to give up the names of his friends who supplied him.
161	36	"The Big Hat"	Jack Webb	John Robinson	May 11, 1956
A young man is found hiding in an empty train car with the strangled body of an older woman next to him.
162	37	"The Big Housemaid"	Jack Webb	Frank Burt	May 18, 1956
163	38	"The Big Gift"	Jack Webb	John Robinson, Frank Burt	May 25, 1956
164	39	"The Big Salvage"	Jack Webb	John Robinson, Frank Burt	June 1, 1956

=== Season 6 (1956–57) ===
Friday's partner throughout this season is Officer Frank Smith.

No. overall	No. in season	Title	Directed by	Written by	Original release date
165	1	"The Big Cat"	Jack Webb	John Robinson, Frank Burt	September 27, 1956
A circus man reports that a tiger escaped from his truck and is now on the loose in Los Angeles.
166	2	"The Big Missus"	Jack Webb	Frank Burt	October 11, 1956
Friday and Smith investigate a report from a wife that her husband is about to commit a crime.
167	3	"The Big Beer"	Jack Webb	John Robinson, Frank Burt	October 18, 1956
168	4	"The Big Net"	Jack Webb	John Robinson, Frank Burt	October 25, 1956
Cast Norman Bartold, Peter Brocco, Julie Van Zandt; Women are attacked in a small area at bus stops, but when the attacker is scratched in the face in a fight with a woman he is cornered and shoots an officer.
169	5	"The Big Convertible"	Jack Webb	Frank Burt	November 1, 1956
A man forges checks to keep himself and his wife in an expensive lifestyle, but he goes too far when he buys a slick convertible.
170	6	"The Big Limp"	Jack Webb	John Robinson, Frank Burt	November 8, 1956
A teenage boy under arrest admits to police that his brother is planning to rob a loan company.
171	7	"The Big Tattoo"	Jack Webb	Milton Geiger	November 15, 1956
Friday and Smith are looking for a robber with an unusual tattoo.
172	8	"The Big Odd"	Jack Webb	John Robinson, Frank Burt	November 22, 1956
Friday and Smith investigate a gabling racket.
173	9	"The Big Bill"	Jack Webb	John Robinson, Frank Burt	November 29, 1956
Friday and Smith investigate reports of counterfeit money appearing all over the city.
174	10	"The Big Search"	Jack Webb	John Robinson, Frank Burt	December 6, 1956
A distraught father reports that his teenage daughter is missing, and things look more bleak when her murdered pet is discovered in her room.
175	11	"The Big Talk"	Jack Webb	Frank Burt	December 13, 1956
A watch salesman reports that he was robbed by two men whom he drank with the night before.
176	12	"The Big Doting Mother"	Jack Webb	Michael Cramoy	December 20, 1956
177	13	"The Big Handcuffs"	Jack Webb	Michael Cramoy	December 27, 1956
178	14	"The Big Father"	Jack Webb	Frank Burt	January 3, 1957
Friday and Smith are on the trail of a burglar who breaks into houses in broad daylight.
179	15	"The Big Switch"	Jack Webb	John Robinson, Frank Burt	January 10, 1957
180	16	"The Big Steal"	Jack Webb	John Robinson, Frank Burt	January 17, 1957
Friday and Smith investigate a rash of burglaries.
181	17	"The Big Manikin"	Jack Webb	John Robinson, Frank Burt	January 24, 1957
A woman reports that her husband has failed to come home after going out with his business partner.
182	18	"The Big No Tooth"	Jack Webb	Frank Burt	January 31, 1957
A bandit carrying a sawed-off shotgun is robbing hotels in the downtown area.
183	19	"The Big Skip"	Jack Webb	John Robinson	February 7, 1957
184	20	"The Big Fin"	Jack Webb	John Robinson	February 14, 1957
A tourist leaves her purse in the back of a cab and it's up to Friday and Smith to track it down.
185	21	"The Big Game"	Jack Webb	Jerry Gruskin	February 21, 1957
Friday and Smith investigate another con ring.
186	22	"The Big Coins"	Jack Webb	John Robinson, Frank Burt	February 28, 1957
Friday and Smith are on the trail of a robber/arsonist that takes nothing of value and then sets the house on fire.
187	23	"The Big Close"	Jack Webb	Michael Cramoy, John Robinson	March 7, 1957
Friday and Smith reopen a closed case because a tip leads them to believe they have the wrong person.
188	24	"The Big Tie"	Jack Webb	Frank Burt	March 14, 1957
Friday and Smith investigate the former employee of a tie manufacturing company.
189	25	"The Big Cup"	Jack Webb	Jerry Gruskin	March 21, 1957
A howling dog leads to the unearthing of the battered body of an old woman in her garden.
190	26	"The Big Truck"	Jack Webb	Michael Cramoy	March 28, 1957
Friday and Smith investigate the hit and run of a little girl.
191	27	"The Big Saint"	Jack Webb	John Robinson, Jack Webb	April 4, 1957
Friday and Smith try to prove that a salvage yard operator is using his business to fix up stolen cars.
192	28	"The Big Match"	Jack Webb	Michael Cramoy, John Robinson	April 11, 1957
An auction house is held up and the only clue to the bandits lies in a dropped matchbook.
193	29	"The Big Help"	Jack Webb	Michael Cramoy, John Robinson	April 18, 1957
Friday and Smith get a tip about a case from an unexpected place.
194	30	"The Big Celebration"	Jack Webb	Michael Cramoy	April 25, 1957
Friday and Smith are on the trail of a thief whose victims are attending weddings and funerals.
195	31	"The Big Cry Baby"	Jack Webb	Jerry Gruskin	May 2, 1957
196	32	"The Big Lesson"	Jack Webb	Michael Cramoy	May 9, 1957
Friday and Smith are on the trail of three masked men responsible for over thirty robberies.
197	33	"The Big Soldier"	Jack Webb	John Robinson	May 16, 1957
198	34	"The Big Make"	Jack Webb	John Robinson, James E. Moser	May 23, 1957
A bakery owner and his daughter are shot down during a robbery.

=== Season 7 (1957–58) ===
Friday's partner throughout this season is Officer Frank Smith. A continuing plot thread throughout the season concerns Smith's ongoing studies for the departmental sergeant's exam.

No. overall	No. in season	Title	Directed by	Written by	Original release date
199	1	"The Big Constitution"	Jack Webb	Frank Burt	September 26, 1957
200	2	"The Big Candy Box"	Jack Webb	Frank Burt	October 3, 1957
201	3	"The Big Button"	Jack Webb	Frank Burt	October 10, 1957
202	4	"The Big Yak"	Jack Webb	John Robinson	October 17, 1957
203	5	"The Big Howard"	Jack Webb	James E. Moser	October 24, 1957
204	6	"The Big Tomato Cans"	Jack Webb	Michael Cramoy	October 31, 1957
205	7	"The Big Dip"	Jack Webb	Michael Cramoy	November 7, 1957
Friday and Smith investigate money being taken from a department store's registers with the help of store security.
206	8	"The Big License Plates"	Jack Webb	Michael Cramoy	November 14, 1957
Friday and Smith investigate a con involving fake license plates.
207	9	"The Big Blank"	Jack Webb	John Meredyth Lucas, Frank Burt	November 21, 1957
A bunch of forged checks are popping up all over the city and it's up to Friday and Smith to catch the forger.
208	10	"The Big Tease"	Jack Webb	James E. Moser	November 28, 1957
209	11	"The Big Love"	Jack Webb	James E. Moser	December 5, 1957
A man reports that his wife ran off with his little girl and the man she was having an affair with. The trail leads Friday and Smith to a suicide pact.
210	12	"The Big Red Wagon"	Jack Webb	Michael Cramoy	December 12, 1957
211	13	"The Big Prescription"	Jack Webb	Ken Kolb, James E. Moser	December 19, 1957
Mrs. Eileen Multon picks up the wrong prescription. Now it's up to Friday and Smith to find her before it's too late.
212	14	"The Big Full Moon"	Jack Webb	Frank Burt	December 26, 1957
213	15	"The Big Jade"	Jack Webb	James E. Moser	January 2, 1958
Friday and Smith investigate a series of jade robberies.
214	16	"The Big Tip"	Jack Webb	Michael Cramoy	January 9, 1958
215	17	"The Big Stubby"	Jack Webb	Frank Burt	January 16, 1958
216	18	"The Big Baby Face"	Jack Webb	Michael Cramoy	January 23, 1958
217	19	"The Big Lip"	Jack Webb	Michael Cramoy	January 30, 1958
Friday and Smith are on the trail of a hit-and-run driver.
218	20	"The Big Boot"	Jack Webb	Ken Kolb	February 13, 1958
Friday and Smith investigate a home invasion and their only clue is a boot print in the mud by a window.
219	21	"The Big Rip"	Jack Webb	Michael Cramoy	February 20, 1958
A man accuses his son of stabbing him, but Friday and Smith find out that his son has an airtight alibi.
220	22	"The Big Excuse"	Jack Webb	John Robinson, Michael Cramoy	February 27, 1958
221	23	"The Big Knot"	Jack Webb	James E. Moser	March 6, 1958
222	24	"The Big Hobby"	Jack Webb	Michael Cramoy	March 13, 1958
223	25	"The Big Organizer"	Jack Webb	Michael Cramoy	March 20, 1958
Friday and Smith are trying to bring down a street gang but are having a hard time getting to the top man known as The Organizer.
224	26	"The Big Gent"	Jack Webb	James E. Moser	March 27, 1958
An ex-con called The Gentleman Bandit begins working again when he holds up a bank with two helpers.
225	27	"The Big Wardrobe"	Jack Webb	Michael Cramoy	April 3, 1958
Friday and Smith track a man who writes bad checks for expensive clothes and then sells the clothes for a profit.
226	28	"The Big War"	Jack Webb	James E. Moser	April 10, 1958
Friday and Smith investigate a report of a teen gang war in the middle of Los Angeles. The Big War is available for free viewing and download at the Internet Archive
227	29	"The Big Bad Count"	Jack Webb	Michael Cramoy	April 17, 1958
228	30	"The Big Evans"	Jack Webb	James E. Moser	April 24, 1958
A man reports that a police officer blackmailed him for money and then beat him up, and he has the bruises to prove his story.
229	31	"The Big Pack Rat"	Jack Webb	Ken Kolb	May 1, 1958
230	32	"The Big Honeymoon"	Jack Webb	James E. Moser	May 8, 1958
Friday and Smith are looking for a man who sells fake honeymoon trips to unsuspecting couples.
231	33	"The Big Eyes"	Jack Webb	Jack Jacobs	May 15, 1958
232	34	"The Big Cracker Box"	Jack Webb	Michael Cramoy	May 22, 1958
Friday and Smith investigate a rash of supermarket robberies, and the burglar's calling card is leaving crackers scattered all over the floor of the store.
233	35	"The Big Perfume Bottle"	Jack Webb	Frank Burt	May 29, 1958
A unique and costly perfume bottle is taken from an upscale home and it's up to Friday and Smith to get it back.
234	36	"The Big Bed"	Jack Webb	James E. Moser	June 5, 1958
A missing persons case turns into a homicide investigation when Friday and Smith find the missing person dead, trapped in his bed that folds into his apartment wall.
235	37	"The Big Ruthie"	Jack Webb	James E. Moser	June 12, 1958
A disgruntled ex-con helps Friday and Smith take down a forgery ring that has cashed thousands of dollars in forged payroll checks.
236	38	"The Big Grifter"	Jack Webb	James E. Moser	June 19, 1958
A con artist operating in the gentle swindle steals money from grieving relatives after their loved ones die.
237	39	"The Big Irony"	Jack Webb	James E. Moser	June 26, 1958
Friday and Smith investigate a murder-suicide of a husband and wife.

=== Season 8 (1958–59) ===
Both Friday and Smith receive promotions in the 8th and final season. Lt. Friday's partner throughout this season is Sgt. Frank Smith.

No. overall	No. in season	Title	Directed by	Written by	Original release date
238	1	"The Big Beating"	Jack Webb	Ken Kolb	September 23, 1958
Friday and Smith investigate a report of a man hitting his wife.
239	2	"The Big Sweet Annie"	Jack Webb	James E. Moser	September 30, 1958
Friday and Smith have to watch out for sweet Annie.
240	3	"The Big Star"	Jack Webb	Frank Burt	October 7, 1958
Friday and Smith investigate a robbery report.
241	4	"The Big Oskar"	Jack Webb	William Spier	October 14, 1958
The detectives take a report of valuables stolen from the home of a somewhat eccentric old lady. They begin to suspect something is amiss when she starts talking about how she gets the "scoop" on crimes by being the first to report them to the local newspaper. The Big Oskar is available for free viewing and download at the Internet Archive
242	5	"The Big Little Boy"	Jack Webb	Frank Burt	October 21, 1958
Friday and Smith are looking for a missing child.
243	6	"The Big Voice"	Jack Webb	Ken Kolb	October 28, 1958
Friday and Smith investigate a gang of thugs.
244	7	"The Big Juke Box"	Jack Webb	Michael Cramoy	November 4, 1958
Friday goes undercover as a bar owner in order to break up an illegal jukebox operation.
245	8	"The Big Doll"	Jack Webb	James E. Moser	November 11, 1958
246	9	"The Big Border"	Jack Webb	James E. Moser	November 18, 1958
Friday and Smith must track a pair of escaped convicts across the Mexican border.
247	10	"The Big Nazi"	Jack Webb	Frank Burt	November 25, 1958
Friday goes undercover to catch a racist murderer.
248	11	"The Big Hot Rod"	Jack Webb	Ken Kolb	December 2, 1958
Friday is on the hunt for a group of teens that are stealing sports cars.
249	12	"The Big Green Monkey"	Jack Webb	Michael Cramoy	December 9, 1958
A woman reports her Jade collection stolen and it's up to Friday and Smith to find it.
250	13	"The Big Hype"	Jack Webb	Michael Cramoy	December 16, 1958
251	14	"The Big Maria"	Jack Webb	James E. Moser	December 23, 1958
252	15	"The Big Donation"	Jack Webb	James E. Moser	December 30, 1958
Two con artists are selling phony magazines subscriptions to unsuspecting suckers.
253	16	"The Big Malcolm"	Jack Webb	John Robinson, Ken Kolb	January 6, 1959
254	17	"The Big Smart Girl"	Jack Webb	James E. Moser	January 13, 1959
255	18	"The Big Doctor"	Jack Webb	Ken Kolb	January 20, 1959
Friday and Smith investigate a doctor making false insurance claims.
256	19	"The Big Signet"	Jack Webb	James E. Moser	January 27, 1959
Friday and Smith have to find a man selling forged passports and paperwork.
257	20	"The Big Accident"	Jack Webb	Ken Kolb	February 3, 1959
An insurance adjuster files a report with Friday about possible fraudulent insurance claims.
258	21	"The Big Mail"	Jack Webb	James E. Moser	February 10, 1959
Friday works with a postal inspector to catch a gang using the mail to scam money from people.
259	22	"The Big Roll"	Jack Webb	James E. Moser	February 17, 1959
260	23	"The Big Thirteen"	Jack Webb	Ken Kolb	February 24, 1959
261	24	"The Big Sour"	Jack Webb	James E. Moser	March 10, 1959
An elderly couple are beaten and robbed. The key to finding the bandits lies in a paper boy and an alert bartender.
262	25	"The Big Starlet"	Jack Webb	Ken Kolb	March 17, 1959
263	26	"The Big Holdup"	Jack Webb	James E. Moser	March 24, 1959
A robber called "The Rattlesnake Bandit" takes pleasure in beating and shooting his victims after he takes their money.
264	27	"The Big Name"	Jack Webb	Frank Burt	March 31, 1959
265	28	"The Big Couple"	Jack Webb	James E. Moser	April 7, 1959
Friday and Smith investigate a husband and wife con team that have a long criminal record.
266	29	"The Big Squeeze"	Jack Webb	Michael Cramoy	April 14, 1959
Friday investigates a robbery that is caused by a blackmail victim's refusal to pay.
267	30	"The Big Picture"	Jack Webb	James E. Moser	April 21, 1959
A young girl commits suicide after she is tricked by a pair of movie talent scouts who are really operating a prostitution ring.
268	31	"The Big Carnation"	Jack Webb	John Robinson, Ken Kolb	April 28, 1959
269	32	"The Big Operator"	Jack Webb	Jack Laird, Wilton Schiller, Frank Burt	July 7, 1959
270	33	"The Big Bray"	Jack Webb	James E. Moser	July 12, 1959
271	34	"The Big Infant"	Jack Webb	Jack Jacobs	July 19, 1959
Friday and Smith track down a missing baby.
272	35	"The Big Appetite"	Jack Webb	Gene Coon	July 26, 1959
273	36	"The Big .38"	Jack Webb	James E. Moser	August 2, 1959
Cab drivers are being held up, but the descriptions given by the victims don't match.
274	37	"The Big Byron"	Jack Webb	Frank Burt	August 9, 1959
Did someone really try to kill George Byron? Friday and Smith are on the case to find out.
275	38	"The Big Counterfeit"	Jack Webb	Ken Kolb	August 16, 1959
A man impersonating a police officer is going to local businesses and asking for donations for the widows and orphans fund. Smith and Friday set out to stop the con man.
276	39	"The Big Red"	Jack Webb	James E. Moser	August 23, 1959
Friday and Smith investigate a series of robberies. This is the final episode of the series.
