= Jesslyn Fax =

Canadian-American actress (1893–1975)

- Fax in Many Happy Returns, 1964
- Born: January 4, 1893; Toronto, Ontario, Canada
- Died: February 16, 1975 (aged 82); Hollywood, California, U.S.
- Occupation: Actress
- Known for: Rear Window; The Music Man; The Man Who Died Twice; The Family Jewels

Jesslyn Fax (January 4, 1893 – February 16, 1975) was a Canadian-American actress. She is known for playing 'Miss Hearing Aid' in Rear Window (1954), Avis Grubb in The Music Man (1962), Miss Hemphill in The Man Who Died Twice (1958), and Airline Passenger in The Family Jewels (1965).

== Early years ==
Fax was born in Toronto, the daughter of Jimmy Fax, a noted Canadian actor and comedian. She began working with her father as a singer, pianist, and monologist when she was 16, then left her father's troupe after five seasons to work in vaudeville and traveling stock companies. She moved to Hollywood in 1949.

== Career ==
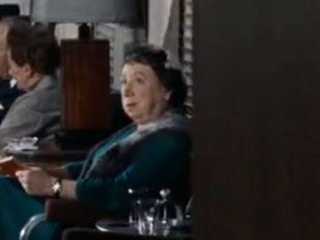
Fax in North by Northwest

A short, cherubic-like character actress, Fax mainly appeared in cheerful small supporting roles as 'little old ladies'. All her known appearances occurred between 1950-1969, whether on television or in film. She served as an occasional comic foil to Jack Benny, Lucille Ball (in a guest appearance on I Love Lucy), and others. She also made appearances in numerous other popular television shows of the 1950s and 1960s such as Gunsmoke, Peter Gunn, Our Miss Brooks, The Jack Benny Program, Alfred Hitchcock Presents and The Alfred Hitchcock Hour, Perry Mason, The Joey Bishop Show, The Man from U.N.C.L.E., The Andy Griffith Show, Gomer Pyle U.S.M.C., and The Wild Wild West. Her film appearances include roles in the Don Knotts films The Ghost and Mr. Chicken (1966) and The Love God? (1969), The Music Man (1962) with Robert Preston, The Family Jewels (1965) with Jerry Lewis, and the Andy Griffith film Angel in My Pocket (1969). In addition to appearing in his television shows, Fax acted in the Alfred Hitchcock murder/suspense films Rear Window (1954), which starred James Stewart and Grace Kelly, and North By Northwest (1959), which starred Cary Grant and Eva Marie Saint.

== Filmography ==
=== Films ===
- Mrs. O'Malley and Mr. Malone (1950) as Train Passenger (uncredited)
- So You Want to Learn to Dance (1953, Short) as Dance Instructress (uncredited)
- Scared Stiff (1953) as Woman in Hotel Hallway (uncredited)
- Here Come the Girls (1953) as Washwoman (uncredited)
- So You Want to Be Your Own Boss (1954, Short) as Restaurant Customer (uncredited)
- Rear Window (1954) as Miss Hearing Aid
- Kiss Me Deadly (1955) as Horace's Wife
- How to Be Very, Very Popular (1955) as Music Teacher
- Shoot-Out at Medicine Bend (1957) as Townswoman (uncredited)
- Desk Set (1957) as Mrs. Hewitt (uncredited)
- An Affair to Remember (1957) as Terry's Landlady (uncredited)
- The Wayward Girl (1957) as Older Prisoner (uncredited)
- The Man Who Died Twice (1958) as Sally Hemphill
- North by Northwest (1959) as Woman on Train (uncredited)
- Blue Denim (1959) as Aunt Margaret (uncredited)
- The Best of Everything (1959) as Aunt (uncredited)
- All the Fine Young Cannibals (1960) as Old Lady (uncredited)
- Maggie (1960, TV Movie) as Miss Caldwell
- The Music Man (1962) as Avis Grubb
- Paradise Alley (1962) as Mrs. Holman
- The Interns (1962) as Mrs. Hitchcock (uncredited)
- The Wheeler Dealers (1963) as Secretary (uncredited)
- 4 for Texas (1963) as Mildred
- The Family Jewels (1965) as Airline Passenger #1
- A Very Special Favor (1965) as Miss Feeny (uncredited)
- Never Too Late (1965) as Saleswoman (uncredited)
- The Ghost and Mr. Chicken (1966) as Mrs. Hutchinson
- The Trouble with Angels (1966) as Resident at Retirement Home (uncredited)
- Three on a Couch (1966) as Rich Lady
- The Spy in the Green Hat (1967) as Mrs. Feinberg
- The Adventures of Bullwhip Griffin (1967) as Gail Goobendick - Maid (uncredited)
- The Gnome-Mobile (1967) as The Bluejay (voice, uncredited)
- Doctor Dolittle (1967) as Old Woman (uncredited)
- Angel in My Pocket (1969) as Mrs. Styles
- The Love God? (1969) as Miss Love (final film role)

=== TV series ===
- Hollywood Theatre Time (1951) (Season 1 Episode 51: "Callahan's Theatrical Boarding House") as Maid
- The Revlon Mirror Theater (1953) (Season 2 Episode 11: "Uncle Jack")
- Our Miss Brooks (1953-1956) (15 episodes) as Angela Devon
- Schlitz Playhouse (1953-1957) (5 episodes)
  - (Season 3 Episode 15: "No Compromise") (1953) as Woman Passenger
  - (Season 3 Episode 19: "Rim of Violence") (1954) as Lady Bettor
  - (Season 3 Episode 51: "Captain in Command") (1954)
  - (Season 5 Episode 4: "The Girl Who Scared Men Off") (1955)
  - (Season 7 Episode 9: "The Hole Card") (1957) as Agnes
- Waterfront (1954) (Season 2 Episode 11: "The Skipper and the Padre") as Housekeeper
- Public Defender (1954) (Season 1 Episode 7: "Behind Bars") as Mrs. Bassett
- Willy (1954) (Season 1 Episode 15: "The Fate of the Theatre") as Louella
- The Loretta Young Show (1954-1957) (2 episodes)
  - (Season 2 Episode 17: "Three Minutes Too Late") (1954) as Mrs. Hulgard
  - (Season 4 Episode 26: "The Room Next Door") (1957) as Mrs. Connors
- The Jack Benny Program (1954-1964) (10 episodes)
  - (Season 5 Episode 1: "Entire Cast Show") (1954) as Martha
  - (Season 8 Episode 3: "Hal March Show") (1957) as Emma, Fan Club VP
  - (Season 10 Episode 6: "Pasadena Fan Club") (1959) as Emma, Fan Club Secretary
  - (Season 10 Episode 14: "Easter Show") (1960) as Emma, Jack's Super-fan
  - (Season 12 Episode 10: "Christmas Party") (1961) as Mother Sara
  - (Season 13 Episode 5: "The Lawrence Welk Show") (1962) as Emma, Fan Club VP
  - (Season 13 Episode 13: "The Story of the New Talent Show") (1962) as Emma, Fan Club VP
  - (Season 13 Episode 19: "Return to Broadway") (1963) as Emma, Fan Club VP
  - (Season 14 Episode 28: "I Am the Fiddler") (1964) as Rick Barton
  - (Season 15 Episode 3: "Andy Williams Show") (1964) as Emma, Fan Club VP
- The Lineup (1955) (Season 1 Episode 26: "Girl Safecrackers")
- The Adventures of Rin Tin Tin (1955) (Season 2 Episode 2: "Rin Tin Tin Meets Shakespeare") as Mrs. Damity
- Dragnet (1956-1957) (2 episodes)
  - (Season 6 Episode 13: "The Big Handcuffs") (1956)
  - (Season 7 Episode 4: "The Big Yak") (1957)
- Jane Wyman Presents the Fireside Theatre (1957) (Season 2 Episode 18: "The Little Black Lie")
- I Love Lucy (1957) (Season 6 Episode 12: "Lucy and the Loving Cup") as Train Passenger
- Suspicion (1957) (Season 1 Episode 1: "Four O'Clock") as Wife
- How to Marry a Millionaire (1958) (Season 1 Episode 19: "Loco Leaves Home") as Mother
- Love That Jill (1958) (Season 1 Episode 11: "Bess of the Bowery") as Dora
- December Bride (1958) (Season 4 Episode 29: "The Capistrano Show")
- The Californians (1958) (Season 1 Episode 31: "Second Trial") as Annie Mortigan
- The Ed Wynn Show (1958) (2 episodes) as Mrs. Creavy
  - (Season 1 Pilot Episode: "Sincerely Sam Hill")
  - (Season 1 Episode 9: "A Date with Mrs. Creavy")
- Westinghouse Desilu Playhouse (1958) (Season 1 Episode 6: "The Time Element") as Maid
- Perry Mason (1958-1964) (2 episodes)
  - (Season 2 Episode 11: "The Case of the Perjured Parrot") (1958) as Court Clerk
  - (Season 7 Episode 18: "The Case of the Nervous Neighbor") (1964) as Little Old Lady
- Peter Gunn (1959) (Season 2 Episode 5: "Death is a Red Rose") as Belle Decanto
- The Many Loves of Dobie Gillis (1959) (Season 1 Episode 9: "Dobie Gillis, Boy Actor") as Ruth Erdlatz
- Johnny Staccato (1960) (Season 1 Episode 18: "The Only Witness") as Clara, Cleaning Lady
- The Ann Sothern Show (1960) (Season 2 Episode 28: "One for the Books") as Tilly Barlow
- New Comedy Showcase (1960) (Season 1 Episode 5: "Maggie") as Miss Caldwell
- The Real McCoys (1961) (Season 4 Episode 39: "George's Housekeeper") as Miss Trumbull
- Pete and Gladys (1961) (Season 2 Episode 11: "Sick, Sick, Sick") as Mrs. Quigley
- Alfred Hitchcock Presents (1961-1962) (3 episodes)
  - (Season 6 Episode 26: "Coming, Mama") (1961) as Mrs. Evans
  - (Season 6 Episode 32: "Self Defense") (1961) as Mrs. Gruber
  - (Season 7 Episode 18: "The Woman Who Wanted to Live") (1962) as Motel Manageress
- The Joey Bishop Show (1961-1964) (2 episodes)
  - (Season 1 Episode 5: "The Contest Winner") (1961) as Cleaning Woman
  - (Season 3 Episode 13: "Jack Carter Helps Joey Propose") (1964) as Woman in Library
- Route 66 (1962) (Season 2 Episode 30: "A Feat of Strength") as Birdie
- Mr. Smith Goes to Washington (1963) (Season 1 Episode 16: "Think Mink") as Abigail Willis
- Gunsmoke (1963) (Season 8 Episode 19: "Cotter's Girl") as Proprietress
- Sam Benedict (1963) (Season 1 Episode 22: "Some Fires Die Slowly") as Sarah Kolsky
- The Alfred Hitchcock Hour (1963) (2 episodes)
  - (Season 1 Episode 20: "The Paragon") as Mrs. Bates
  - (Season 1 Episode 23: "The Lonely Hours") as Mrs. McGuiness
- The Eleventh Hour (1963) (Season 1 Episode 32: "The Middle Child Gets All the Aches") as Mrs. Polhemus
- Many Happy Returns (1964-1965) (9 episodes) as Wilma Fritter
  - (Season 1 Episode 1: "Pilot Show") (1964)
  - (Season 1 Episode 2: "Walter Meets the Machine") (1964)
  - (Season 1 Episode 5: "Burnley at the Bridge") (1964)
  - (Season 1 Episode 8: "Mother Burnley's Chickens") (1964)
  - (Season 1 Episode 9: "Krockmeyer on Avon") (1964)
  - (Season 1 Episode 15: "Taming of the Beast") (1965)
  - (Season 1 Episode 20: "Pop Goes the Easel") (1965)
  - (Season 1 Episode 22: "Big White Lie") (1965)
  - (Season 1 Episode 25: "The Woodsman") (1965)
- The Man from U.N.C.L.E. (1965-1966) (2 episodes)
  - (Season 1 Episode 20: "The Bow-Wow Affair") (1965) as Mr. Willard
  - (Season 3 Episode 11: "The Concrete Overcoat Affair: Part 1") (1966) as Mrs. Feinberg
- My Brother the Angel (1966) (Season 1 Episode 21: "The Big Newsboy War") as Little Old Lady
- The Monkees (1966) (Season 1 Episode 8: "Don't Look a Gift Horse in the Mouth") as Mrs. Purdy
- Batman (1967) (Season 2 Episode 35: "The Contaminated Cowl") as Bon Bon
- Please Don't Eat the Daisies (1967) (Season 2 Episode 17: "The Cupid Machine") as Mrs. Mealy
- Gomer Pyle: USMC (1967) (Season 3 Episode 22: "To Re-enlist or Not to Re-enlist") as Mrs. Nelson
- The Girl from U.N.C.L.E. (1967) (Season 1 Episode 26: "The Double O-Nothing Affair") as Mrs. Barnes
- The Second Hundred Years (1967) (Season 1 Episode 6: "The Ungathered Moss") as Mildred Finch
- The Wild Wild West (1967) (Season 3 Episode 7: "The Night of the Hangman") as Mrs. Peacock
- The Andy Griffith Show (1967) (Season 8 Episode 11: "Andy's Investment") as Mrs. Le Grande
- Cimarron Strip (1968) (Season 1 Episode 20: "Big Jessie") as Eva
- The Doris Day Show (1969) (Season 1 Episode 24: "The Still") as Lydia Lindsay

=== Radio series ===
- Our Miss Brooks: "Mr. Conklin's Wax Effigies" (1954) as "Mrs. Davis's" sister "Angela"(?)
- Our Miss Brooks: "Outpost Road" (1955) as unknown
