= Richard L. Bare =

American film director (1913–2015)

- Born: Richard Leland Bare; August 12, 1913; Turlock, California, U.S.
- Died: March 28, 2015 (aged 101); Newport Beach, California, U.S.
- Occupations: Film director, producer, screenwriter
- Years active: 1942–1973, 2007–2015
- Spouses: Virginia Carpenter (m. 1941; div. 1946) Phyllis Coates (m. 1948; div. 1949) Julie Van Zandt (m. 1951; div. 1957) Jeanne Evans (m. 1958; div. 1965) Gloria Beutel (m. 1968; died 2012)
- Children: 2

Richard Leland Bare (August 12, 1913 – March 28, 2015) was an American director, producer, and screenwriter of Hollywood movies, television shows and short films.

== Career ==
Born in Turlock, California, the ambitious youngster took 24 lessons at the New York Institute of Photography. He later attended USC School of Cinematic Arts where he directed his most notable student film, The Oval Portrait, an adaptation of Edgar Allan Poe's story. He submitted short films of local events to Universal Pictures' newsreel division.

Bare ran a movie theater in Carmel, California in the early 1930s. Anxious to become his own producer, Bare placed a newspaper ad inviting producers to let him invest in their pictures. The first to answer the ad was a notoriously fast-buck entrepreneur, Denver Dixon, who specialized in making extremely low-budget westerns. Bare recalled, "The sum of $2500 was all he needed to make a western. Even I with my limited experience knew that one could hardly make a feature film for that kind of money. 'Oh, it's not going to be a feature,' he explained. 'It's a two-reel short. Theaters are cutting down on double features, and there's going to be a good market for short subjects, especially westerns.' I could see this as an opportunity to re-enter movie production, which was my first love." Bare, his friend Dick Towle, and actor Glen Beever invested in Dixon's film, resulting in the incorporation of Security Pictures Corporation, with Bare as president. Dixon acknowledged Bare's contribution by giving him a special screen credit: "Richard L. Bare presents The Double Cross." It was Bare's first and last project with Dixon. "One good thing came out of the Denver Dixon episode -- I met a man who became both a friend and a mentor for years to come. James Hogan came to my rescue and got me on the payroll at Paramount."

Bare and Towle were on the scene when an earthquake hit Long Beach, California. "I had the DeVry camera with me and plenty of film. [The police] were stopping everyone who wanted to enter the city. I flashed my Universal Newsreel card. We set up the DeVry, knowing that the newsreels wouldn't even arrive until dawn. We started grinding away at the devastation all around us. I even made Dick lie down like he was injured to add a bit of human interest... I had scooped the pros on a really big story." He sold the footage to Universal Newsreel for $175.

Bare became an instructor at USC, where he singlehandedly filmed a class project from his own script, called So You Want to Give Up Smoking. A young actor then playing bit parts, George O'Hanlon, was the leading character in the film. Bare explained and demonstrated each step of the filmmaking process to the students. He offered the finished film to Warner Brothers, which purchased it for $2500. Bare then had to get the negative from the university, and had to explain to USC president Warren Scott that he had accepted money for a college project. The president reasoned that the students had received valuable training while making the film, and asked Bare to donate $1000 to the university, which would put an end to the matter. "I put the $1500 in my pocket, then wrote out a check for $250 to O'Hanlon. At the same time I signed him to a seven-year contract, anticipating that there might be more of these subjects." The pilot film resulted in a long-running series of short-subject comedies starring George O'Hanlon as Joe McDoakes.

By the 1950s Bare was shooting three Joe McDoakes comedies simultaneously, within four days. "I brought a new, fast-paced production technique to what was then a cumbersome and expensive studio. So much so that when WB went into television, they asked me to produce and direct their first TV series."

On television, Bare directed seven classic The Twilight Zone episodes: "To Serve Man", "What's in the Box?", "The Fugitive", "Third from the Sun", "The Purple Testament", "Nick of Time" and "The Prime Mover". He directed almost every episode of the 1960s-1970s CBS television series Green Acres. He directed six episodes of the 1975 TV series Westwind: "The Menehunes," "Terror Beach," "Sea Jackals," "Killing Kahuna," "Tuto - Kane," and "Ransom at Makena." He also directed feature films, including Shoot-Out at Medicine Bend and Wicked, Wicked. On May 2, 2014, he acquired the rights with producer Phillip Goldfine to produce a movie and Broadway play based on Green Acres.

His memoir Confessions of a Hollywood Director discusses his directorial work, as well as behind-the-scenes information, and his service as a captain in the Army Air Forces' First Motion Picture Unit. Bare also wrote The Film Director: A Practical Guide to Motion Picture and Television Techniques (1971; ISBN 0-02-012130-X), a text to teach the craft of directing to aspiring filmmakers. On November 19, 2007, Bare announced that he was working on a revival of Green Acres.

He died on March 28, 2015, at the age of 101 at his home in Newport Beach, California.

== Filmography ==
- Two Gun Troubador (1939)
- Smart Girls Don't Talk (1948)
- Flaxy Martin (1949)
- The House Across the Street (1949)
- Return of the Frontiersman (1950)
- This Side of the Law (1950)
- So You Want to Learn to Dance (1953)
- Shoot-Out at Medicine Bend (1957)
- Girl on the Run (1958)
- I Sailed to Tahiti with an All Girl Crew (1968)
- Wicked, Wicked (1973)
