= Richard Karlan =

American actor

- Born: April 24, 1919; Brooklyn, New York City, New York
- Died: September 10, 2004 (aged 85); Los Angeles, California
- Occupation: Actor

Richard Karlan (April 24, 1919 – September 10, 2004) was an American actor. He appeared in the films Snow Dog, Union Station, Between Midnight and Dawn, The Lemon Drop Kid, Love Is Better Than Ever, The Racket, Wait till the Sun Shines, Nellie, Tangier Incident, Blowing Wild, All the Brothers Were Valiant, Captain Kidd and the Slave Girl, Abbott and Costello Meet the Mummy, The Steel Jungle, Accused of Murder, Hollywood or Bust, Rock All Night, The Crooked Circle, The Man Who Died Twice, Inside the Mafia and Star!, among others.

He died of pneumonia on September 10, 2004, in Los Angeles, California at age 85.

== Filmography ==
Year	Title	Role	Notes
1950	Love That Brute	Mug	Uncredited
1950	Snow Dog	Biroff	
1950	Union Station	Detective George Stein	
1950	Between Midnight and Dawn	Officer Charlie Nichols	Uncredited
1950	Sierra Passage	Bart	
1951	The Lemon Drop Kid	Maxie	Uncredited
1951	The Redhead and the Cowboy	Captain Peters	Uncredited
1951	Bright Victory	Bartender	Uncredited
1951	No Questions Asked	Sy	Uncredited
1951	Rhubarb	Pencil Louie	Uncredited
1951	The Racket	Breeze Enright	
1951	The Unknown Man	Police Lieutenant	Uncredited
1952	Sailor Beware	Guard	Uncredited
1952	Love Is Better Than Ever	Siddo	Uncredited
1952	Wait till the Sun Shines, Nellie	Mike Kava	
1952	Dreamboat	Herman	Uncredited
1952	O. Henry's Full House	Headwaiter	(segment "The Cop and the Anthem"), Uncredited
1953	Tangier Incident	Rosnov	
1953	Scared Stiff	Gangster	Uncredited
1953	Champ for a Day	Gambler	Uncredited
1953	Blowing Wild	Henderson	
1953	All the Brothers Were Valiant	Sam	Uncredited
1954	Casanova's Big Night	Outside Guard	Uncredited
1954	Captain Kidd and the Slave Girl	Capt. Avery	
1955	Abbott and Costello Meet the Mummy	Hetsut	
1955	Toughest Man Alive	Henchman	Uncredited
1956	The Steel Jungle	C.O.D.	
1956	Accused of Murder	Chad Bayless	
1956	Hollywood or Bust	Sammy Ross	Uncredited
1957	Rock All Night	Jerry	
1957	The Crooked Circle	Sam Lattimer	
1958	The Man Who Died Twice	Santoni	
1959	Inside the Mafia	'Chins' Dayton	
1961	Pocketful of Miracles	Detective	Uncredited
1961	The Twilight Zone	D'Alessandro	Episode: "The Mirror"
1968	Star!	David Holtzmann	
1985	First Strike	Soviet General	(final film role)
