= Frank Burt (screenwriter) =

American screenwriter

Frank Burt was an American screenwriter, who wrote for TV, film, and radio.

He was one of the writers of the James Stewart radio drama The Six Shooter. He also co-wrote the Stewart film The Man from Laramie. He was highly regarded by Stewart. The TV series The Restless Gun was based on a story and characters Frank Burt created. He joined the writing staff of Dragnet in 1955, and was a prolific contributor to that show in its later seasons.

Burt died of a heart attack in 1958, at the age of 38.
