= Blowing Wild =

1953 film by Hugo Fregonese

- Theatrical release poster
- Directed by: Hugo Fregonese
- Written by: Philip Yordan
- Produced by: Milton Sperling
- Starring: Gary Cooper; Barbara Stanwyck; Ruth Roman; Anthony Quinn
- Cinematography: Sidney Hickox
- Edited by: Alan Crosland Jr.
- Music by: Dimitri Tiomkin
- Color process: Black and white
- Production company: United States Pictures
- Distributed by: Warner Bros. Pictures
- Release dates: September 16, 1953 (San Antonio, Texas); October 7, 1953 (New York City)
- Running time: 89 minutes
- Country: United States
- Language: English
- Box office: $2 million (US)

Blowing Wild is a 1953 American Western film directed by Hugo Fregonese starring Gary Cooper, Barbara Stanwyck, and Anthony Quinn. It was written by Philip Yordan. The story revolves around a love triangle set in the oilfields of an unnamed South American country plagued with bandits. Ruth Roman also stars and adds to the romantic entanglements.

Frankie Laine sang the title song, "Blowing Wild (The Ballad of Black Gold)", which was written by Dmitri Tiomkin, with lyrics by Paul Francis Webster.

== Plot ==
After the bandit El Gavilan and his men blow up their oil rig, broke wildcatters Jeff Dawson and "Dutch" Peterson head back to town looking for work. Sal Donnelly, an American down on her luck, tries to use her charms to get Jeff to buy her a ticket to get home; Jeff offers his oil lease as payment, but the ticket taker shows him a fistful of leases he already has.

Jeff accepts a very dangerous job delivering unstable nitroglycerin the next day for $800, despite Dutch's protests. That night, Dutch tries to mug a man for enough money to buy a meal. The man turns out to be "Paco" Conway, an old friend and former partner of Jeff and Dutch, who has struck it rich. He offers them work, but his marriage to Jeff's old flame Marina makes Jeff turn it down. The next day, Jeff and Dutch (and the nitroglycerin) are ambushed by El Gavilan. They get away, though Dutch is shot in the leg.

When Jeff goes to collect their pay, Jackson claims he does not have that much on him. Sal, whom Jackson is romancing, tells Jeff that Jackson has $2500 in his wallet. Jeff gets his money, after a brawl, and gives $200 to Sal for her ticket. However, a policeman confiscates Jeff's $600, as Jackson has other creditors, though he is gracious enough to leave Sal her money. With Dutch in the hospital, Jeff reluctantly goes to work for Paco, drilling a new oil well.

Marina makes romantic overtures to Jeff, but he avoids her as best he can. He reminds her that he loved her once, but could not trust her. She admits it, but says she realized she loved him too after he had left. Paco remains oblivious to what is going on. To Jeff's initial annoyance, Sal gets a job as a blackjack dealer and sticks around. Later though, he starts going into town to see her.

When El Gavilan threatens to blow up Paco's oil wells unless he pays $50,000 extortion money, Paco considers paying, much to Jeff's disgust. Marina sides with Jeff, calling her husband a coward. A drunken Paco later laments publicly that his wife loves another man. He finally realizes the other man is Jeff. When Paco tells her that he loves her regardless, Marina pushes him into a well, where the machinery kills him. Marina claims that Paco fell in by accident. When she lets slip to Jeff that she killed Paco so they could be together, he nearly strangles her, then regains control of himself and leaves the house. Just then, the bandits attack. The local police and Jeff fight them. Marina is irresistibly drawn to the fatal oil well during the battle, and dies when it is blown up. Jeff kills El Gavilan, then leaves with Dutch and Sal.

== Cast ==
- Gary Cooper as Jeff Dawson
- Barbara Stanwyck as Marina Conway
- Ruth Roman as Sal Donnelly
- Anthony Quinn as Ward "Paco" Conway
- Ward Bond as Dutch Peterson
- Ian MacDonald as Jackson
- Richard Karlan as Henderson
- Juan García as El Gavilan (as Juan Garcia)
