= So You Want to Learn to Dance =

1953 film by Richard Bare

- Directed by: Richard Bare
- Written by: Richard Bare
- Story by: George O'Hanlon
- Produced by: Gordon Hollingshead; Richard Bare
- Starring: George O'Hanlon
- Cinematography: Sidney Hickox
- Edited by: Rex Steele
- Music by: William Lava
- Production company: Richard L. Bare Productions
- Distributed by: Warner Bros. Pictures
- Release date: March 28, 1953
- Running time: 10 minutes
- Country: United States
- Language: Silent

So You Want to Learn to Dance is a 1953 American black-and-white short comedy film co-produced, written and directed by Richard Bare. It stars George O'Hanlon as Joe McDoakes.

== Synopsis ==
Joe McDoakes is invited by his boss to a swanky dance. Joe admits he can't dance and the boss gives him a lesson in the office. At the dance, Joe is a social failure and makes many mistakes while dancing with his boss' wife. Joe goes to a dancing school and becomes a big success.

== Cast ==
- George O'Hanlon as Joe McDoakes
- Steve Carruthers, James Gonzalez, Jack Mower, Suzanne Ridgway, Cosmo Sardo and Bert L. Stevens as Dance Attendees
- Jesslyn Fax as Dance Instructress
- Creighton Hale as Barber
- Emory Parnell as George Blivens - Joe's Boss

== In popular culture ==
A segment of the short, in particular including O'Hanlon and Ridgway, is featured in the 1990 Tiny Toon Adventures episode "Animaniacs!" (not to be confused with the similarly titled animated series that ran from 1993–98).
