= Dani Crayne =

American actress (born 1934)

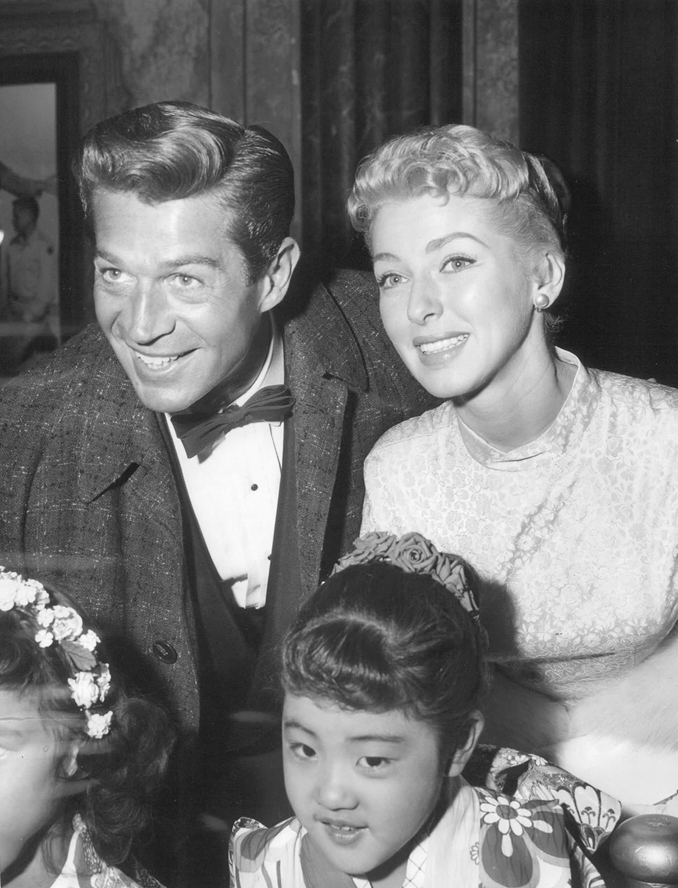
- Crayne and George Nader in 1956
- Born: Darlyne Danielle Goldman; December 25, 1934 (age 91); Minneapolis, Minnesota, U.S.
- Other names: Dani Greco; Dani Janssen
- Education: University of California
- Occupation: Actress
- Years active: 1955–2005
- Spouse: Donald Crayne (m. 1951; div. 1955) Buddy Greco (m. 1961; div. 1974) David Janssen (m. 1975; died 1980) Hal Needham (m. 1981; div. 1987)
- Children: 1

Darlyne Danielle Goldman (born December 25, 1934) is an American actress and model, mostly active in 1950s.

== Early years ==
Crayne was born on December 25, 1934, in Minneapolis, Minnesota. After living there for most of the first decade of her life, she moved around the United States with her parents, who sold real estate. The relocations resulted in her attending 14 schools.

A talent executive at Universal-International (U-I) discovered her in 1954 at a dancing school in Hollywood while she was teaching mambo lessons. Prior to that she had worked as a fork-lift operator and been an optometrist's assistant. She said, "I never really started out to be an actress. I never modeled or studied dramatics ..."

== Career ==
Crayne signed a contract with U-I in 1954. She appeared as a singer and dancer in the film Ain't Misbehavin' (1955). After two years at U-I she worked for Warner Bros.

In 1962, Crayne said that she had lost her interest in acting and preferred to be a housewife.

For many years, she hosted the most exclusive party in Los Angeles after each year's Academy Awards. "You have to either own an Oscar or have been nominated to come," she told the New York Times in 2005.

== Personal life ==
Her first husband was Donalde Crayne; they divorced after four years. She later married singer Buddy Greco, and after their divorce she wed David Janssen. He died in 1980. Her fourth husband was actor-director-stuntman Hal Needham, whom she divorced in 1987. In 1990, she dated Clint Eastwood.

== Filmography ==
Filmography
Year	Title	Role	Credit
2005	Going Shopping	Shopper	Film
1988	Stealing Home	Hooker	Film
1987	Body Slam	Bitsy Vandervagen	Film
1978	Standing Tall	Ginny Tarver	Film
1957	The Story of Mankind	Helen of Troy	Film
1957	Shoot-Out at Medicine Bend	Nell Garrison	Film
1957	Cheyenne	Mary Ellen McSwayne	TV Show
1956	Kelly and Me	Olive Benson	Film
1956	Conflict	Jackie McQuade/Louella Summers	TV Show
1956	Written on the Wind	Blonde	Film
1956	The Unguarded Moment	Josie Warren	Film
1956	Warner Brothers Presents		TV SHow
1956	Walk the Proud Land		Film
1956	A Day of Fury	Claire	Film
1956	World in My Corner	Doris	Film
1955	The Shrike		Film
1955	Ain't Misbehavin'	Millie	Film
