= World in My Corner =

1956 film by Jesse Hibbs

- Directed by: Jesse Hibbs
- Screenplay by: Jack Sher
- Story by: Jack Sher; Joseph Stone
- Produced by: Aaron Rosenberg
- Starring: Audie Murphy; Barbara Rush; Jeff Morrow
- Cinematography: Maury Gertsman
- Edited by: Milton Carruth
- Music by: Joseph Gershenson
- Color process: Black and white
- Production company: Universal Pictures
- Distributed by: Universal Pictures
- Release date: 1956
- Running time: 82 minutes
- Country: United States
- Language: English

World in My Corner is a 1956 American film noir drama sports film directed by Jesse Hibbs and starring Audie Murphy, Barbara Rush and Jeff Morrow. The film was produced and distributed by Universal Pictures. It is one of the few non-Western films in which Murphy appeared.

== Plot ==
Tommy Shea, a boxer from Jersey City, is sponsored by millionaire Robert Mallinson. He falls for Mallinson's daughter Dorothy, who wants freedom from her father's controlling ways and to pursue her writing career. In order to acquire enough money to begin his life with Dorothy, Tommy begins to work for crooked fight promoter Harry Cram. This causes conflict with his honest manager, Dave Bernstein. As his big fight approaches, Tommy is torn about what he should do.

== Cast ==
- Audie Murphy as Tommy Shea
- Barbara Rush as Dorothy Mallinson
- Jeff Morrow as Robert T. Mallinson
- John McIntire as Dave Bernstein
- Tommy Rall as Ray Kacsmerek
- Howard St. John as Harry Cram
- Chico Vejar as Al Carelli
- Steve Ellis as TV announcer
- Art Aragon as fighter
- Dani Crayne as Doris
- Jimmy Lennon as Ring Announcer (as James F. Lennon)
- Cisco Andrade as Parker
- Harold 'Tommy' Hart as Stretch Caplow (as H. Tommy Hart, also acted as the film's technical adviser)
- Sheila Bromley as Mrs. Mallinson

== Production ==
The film was Murphy's first following the tremendous box-office success of To Hell and Back (1955), a film with the same producer and director as for World in My Corner. Murphy fights with several real-life boxers on screen, including Chico Vejar, Art Aragon and Cisco Andrade. Andrade later praised Murphy as being "the first actor I ever saw who wasn't afraid of getting hit hard in a prize fight scene."

== Reception ==
In a contemporary review for The New York Times, critic Milton Esterow wrote: "The prizefighters on the Palace screen are getting thinner. The Palace ring dramas aren't putting on any weight, either. The theatre's last fight film was about a middleweight (160 pounds). Yesterday's offering, 'World in My Corner," concerns a welterweight (147 pounds). ... Universal-International keeps the leather flying with the aid of a gent named Chico Vejar, who has been in the ring for real. But please, U-I, hang up the gloves and toss in the towel for a while. We're getting a little punchy."

According to Murphy's biographer, the film "didn't do anything at the box office".

== See also ==
- List of boxing films
