= This Side of the Law =

1950 film by Richard L. Bare

- Theatrical release lobby card
- Directed by: Richard L. Bare
- Screenplay by: Russell S. Hughes
- Story by: Richard Sale
- Produced by: Saul Elkins
- Starring: Kent Smith; Viveca Lindfors
- Cinematography: Carl E. Guthrie
- Edited by: Frank Magee
- Music by: William Lava
- Production company: Warner Bros. Pictures
- Distributed by: Warner Bros. Pictures
- Release date: June 16, 1950 (United States)
- Running time: 74 minutes
- Country: United States
- Language: English

This Side of the Law is a 1950 American film noir directed by Richard L. Bare, and starring Kent Smith, Viveca Lindfors, Robert Douglas, and Janis Paige.

== Plot ==
David Cummins is trapped in a dry cistern and wondering whether he will die there. A flashback to a week earlier reveals the events that landed him there.

David, a bright but downtrodden hobo, is arrested for vagrancy, and he is sentenced to pay $50 or serve 30 days in prison. After lawyer Philip Cagle pays the fine, he explains to David that he is the executor of the estate of the wealthy Malcolm Taylor, to whom David bears a striking physical resemblance. Taylor has been missing for nearly seven years and is about to be declared legally dead, which Cagle hopes to avoid. He offers David $500 to impersonate Taylor, but David demands $5,000 before agreeing. They drive to Taylor's mansion near a cliff, where David must fool Taylor's wife Evelyn, brother Calder and sister-in-law Nadine. Just as they arrive, Cagle tells him, "By the way, your brother hates you."

Evelyn is unhappy to see David, as Taylor was not a nice man. She does not know that her husband's most recent affair was with Nadine. The impersonation works for some time, and David becomes increasingly attracted to Evelyn. However, Nadine notices that his wrists are not scarred, as were Taylor's, and she offers to remain quiet for a share of the estate. David informs Cagle, who telephones Nadine, and it becomes clear that Cagle and Nadine are coconspirators. At a lonely spot on the estate, Cagle kills Nadine and throws her body from the cliff into the ocean for trying to double-cross him. The police declare Nadine's death an accident. David decides to leave and Cagle offers him a ride but knocks him unconscious and throws him into the cistern. When David regains consciousness, he discovers Taylor's skeletal remains beside him. He manages to climb out of the cistern.

Cagle stresses to the grieving Calder the unlikelihood that Nadine's death was accidental and reminds him that Evelyn hated Nadine. Evelyn packs her belongings, wishing to leave in the mansion. Calder asks her to accompany him to Nadine's favorite spot, next to the cliff. He accuses her of murder and tries to push her from the cliff. David, who has just escaped the cistern, hears Evelyn's screams and rushes to rescue her, knocking Calder down.

David confronts Cagle, who draws a gun. The sound of a police siren is heard, as Cagle had phoned them informing about Calder's supposed threats. When Evelyn appears unexpectedly behind Cagle, David is able to dim the lights so that Cagle's shots miss him. Cagle flees, and Angel chases him and catches him next to the cistern, with its lid still open from David's escape. Philip falls into the cistern while fighting the dog.

Matters are resolved with the police and Evelyn is unwilling to press charges against David, showing that she now returns his feelings.

== Cast ==
- Kent Smith as David Cummins
- Viveca Lindfors as Evelyn Taylor
- Robert Douglas as Philip Cagle
- Janis Paige as Nadine Taylor
- John Alvin as Calder Taylor
- Monte Blue as The Sheriff
- Frances Morris as Miss Roberts
- Nita Talbot as Miss Goff

== Reception ==
The New York Times critic Bosley Crowther called This Side of the Law "a dreary little film".

Critic John L. Scott of the Los Angeles Times wrote: "Identity of the man who engineers most of the dirty work is a fairly well-kept secret until the final portion of the film, although tried-and-true 'whodunit' fans won't have much trouble figuring it out."
