= The Man Who Died Twice (film) =

1958 film by Joseph Kane

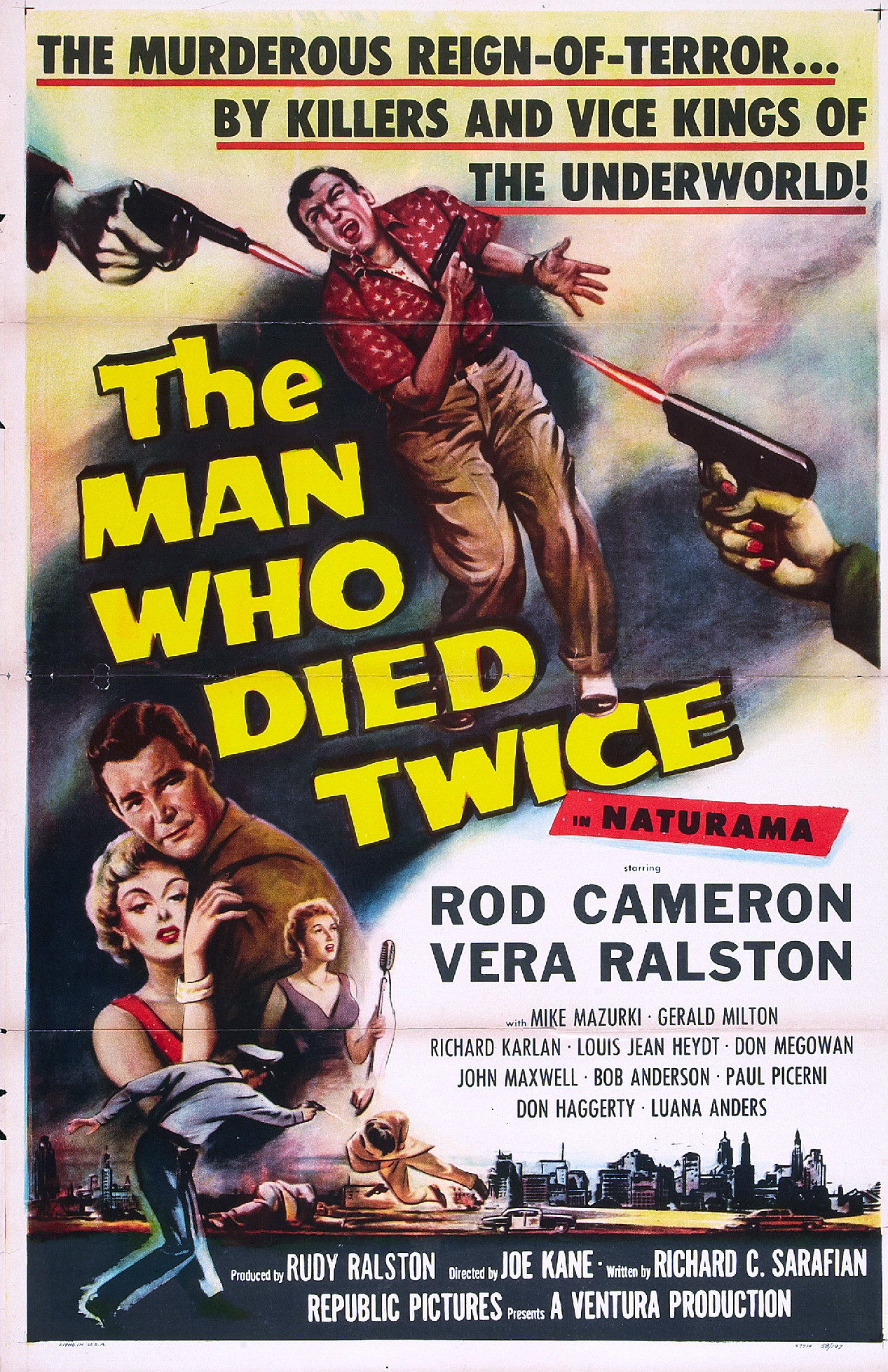
- Theatrical release poster
- Directed by: Joseph Kane
- Screenplay by: Richard C. Sarafian
- Produced by: Rudy Ralston
- Starring: Rod Cameron; Vera Ralston; Mike Mazurki; Gerald Milton; Richard Karlan; Louis Jean Heydt
- Cinematography: Jack A. Marta
- Edited by: Frederic Knudtson
- Production company: Ventura Pictures Corporation
- Distributed by: Republic Pictures
- Release date: June 6, 1958
- Running time: 70 minutes
- Country: United States
- Language: English

The Man Who Died Twice is a 1958 American crime film drama, directed by Joseph Kane and written by Richard C. Sarafian. The film stars Rod Cameron, Vera Ralston (in her last film role before retiring), Mike Mazurki, Gerald Milton, Richard Karlan and Louis Jean Heydt. The film was released on June 6, 1958, by Republic Pictures.

== Plot ==
Lynn Brennon learns that her husband of three months, nightclub owner T.J. Brennon, has been killed in a car crash. When she returns to their apartment, she finds three men fighting on her balcony. One is thrown off, another shot. The third flees down a fire escape.

A pair of Chicago hit men, Hart and Santoni, turn up while narcotics lawmen Hampton and Sloane begin to investigate. Bill Brennon turns up, having received a telegram from his brother T.J. asking for help. He finds sister-in-law Lynn in shock. A suspicious Hampton and Sloane discover that Bill works with the Kansas City police.

Minelli, a gangster, is suspected of running a drug ring. Bill tries to get information out of Lynn, who is unaware that a doll in her apartment has heroin hidden inside it. A bartender from the nightclub, Rak, drives her home, then searches for the heroin while she is asleep.

While the hit men get a contract to murder Minelli, they also deal with an old lady, Sally, who has been spying on them. Minelli and Rak are both killed, but just when Lynn feels safe, husband T.J. turns up alive. He's been behind the killings and drug deals all along. Bill Brennon arrives just in time to help the cops stop his corrupt brother.

== Cast ==
- Rod Cameron as William 'Bill' Brennon
- Vera Ralston as Lynn Brennon
- Mike Mazurki as Rak
- Gerald Milton as Hart
- Richard Karlan as Santoni
- Louis Jean Heydt as Capt. Andy Hampton
- Don Megowan as T.J. Brennon
- John Maxwell as Chief Sloane
- Robert Anderson as Sgt. Williams
- Paul Picerni as George
- Don Haggerty as Frank
- Luana Anders as Young Girl Addict
- Jesslyn Fax as Sally Hemphill
