= Julie Van Zandt =

American film actor (1929–2018)

- Born: Julie Ann Van Zandt; June 27, 1929; San Diego, California, U.S.
- Died: January 11, 2018 (aged 88); Santa Monica, California, U.S.
- Occupation: Actress
- Spouses: Richard L. Bare (m. 1951; div. 1957); Robert H. Rains (m. 1958; div. 1959); Fred May (m. 1966; died 1993)
- Children: 2

Julie Van Zandt (June 27, 1929 – January 11, 2018) was an American actress.

== Early life ==
Her parents were Logan and Lineta Marqua Van Zandt. The family moved to Los Angeles, and Julie went to Westlake School for Girls.

In 1950, she had a part in stage musical High and Dry.

== Filmography ==
=== Film ===
- The Best Things in Life Are Free (1956)
- The Couch (1962)
- Brainstorm (1965)

=== Television ===
- Dragnet (1956, 1 ep.)
- Science Fiction Theatre (1956, 1 ep.)
- Gunsmoke (1957, 1 ep.)
- Richard Diamond, Private Detective (1957, 1 ep.)
- The Web (1957, 1 ep.)
- Broken Arrow (1958, 1 ep.)
- Zorro (1958, 1 ep.)
- The Ann Sothern Show (1959, 1 ep.)
- Tales of Wells Fargo (1959, 1 ep.)
- The Millionaire (1960, 1 ep.)
- 77 Sunset Strip (5 episodes, 1961–1963)
- Bronco (1962, 1 ep.)
- The Twilight Zone (1962, 1 ep.)
- Lawman (1962, 1 ep.)
- The Beverly Hillbillies (1962, 1 ep.)
- The Gallant Men (1963, 1 ep.)
- Wendy and Me (1965, 1 ep.)

== Other works ==
Julie Van Zandt was also a painter. Her mural depicting the Chumash people is on display in the Malibu Lagoon Museum.

== Personal life ==
From 1951 to 1957, Van Zandt was married to television director Richard L. Bare and had two children with him. From 1958 to 1959, she was married to Robert H. Rains. In 1966, she married Frederick Clemens May, a former husband of Lana Turner.
