= Ted McCord =

Ted McCord may refer to:

- Ted McCord (cinematographer) (1900–1976), American director of photography
- Ted McCord (musician) (1907–after 1947), American jazz clarinetist and saxophonist

== See also ==
- McCord (surname)
