= Lennie Bremen =

American actor (1915–1986)

Leonard Bremen
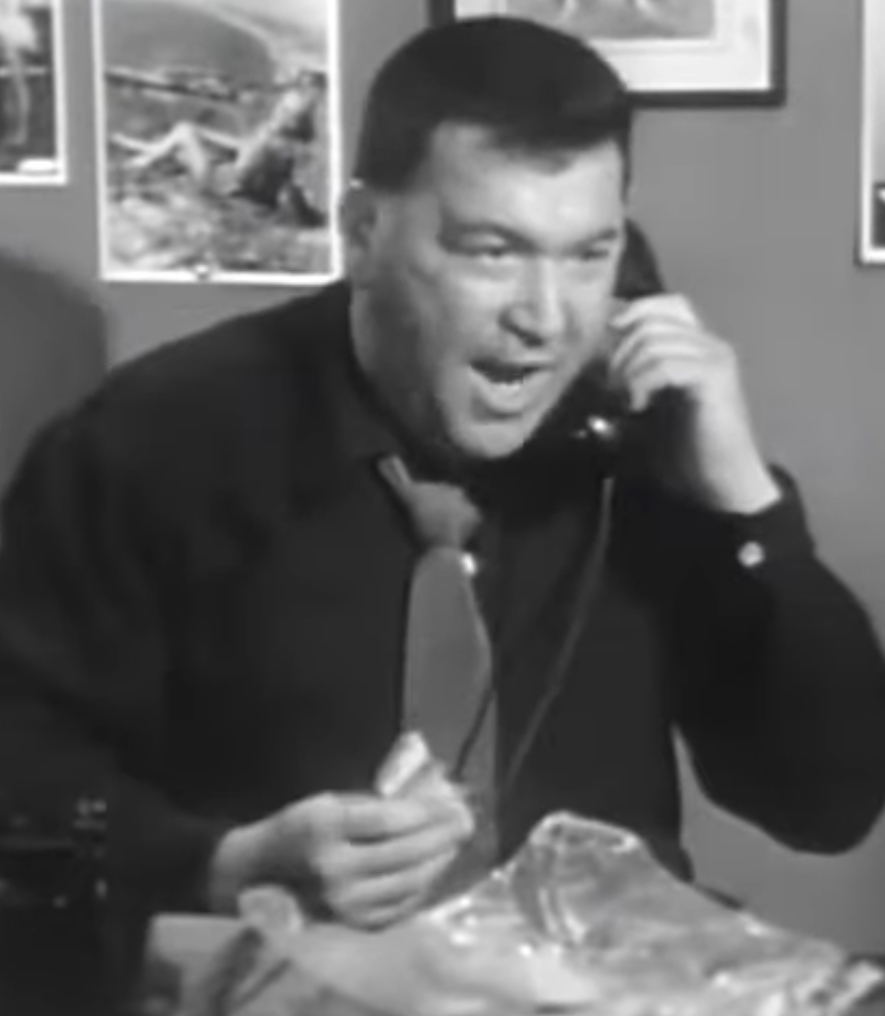
- Bremen in an episode of The Public Defender (1955)
- Born: November 13, 1915; Brooklyn, New York, U.S.
- Died: March 21, 1986 (aged 70); Los Angeles, California, U.S.
- Resting place: Riverside National Cemetery, Riverside, California
- Occupation: Actor
- Years active: 1945–1985

Leonard Bremen (November 13, 1915 – March 21, 1986) was an American actor. He was active in military-sponsored theatrical and radio productions during World War II and later appeared in numerous film and television roles throughout the mid-20th century.

== Early life and military service ==
Bremen was born on November 13, 1915, in Brooklyn, New York. During World War II, he served as a private in the 381st Base Headquarters and Air Base Squadron of the United States Army Air Forces. While stationed at Reno Army Air Base, he became involved in military entertainment programs produced by the Army’s Public Relations Office.

== Stage and radio work ==
In 1943, Bremen played the lead role of "Joe" in Dear Ed, a serialized military musical-comedy stage and radio production. The show was broadcast weekly on KOH radio and performed at the base theater. The production followed the humorous misadventures of military personnel and was part of the Army’s morale-building efforts.

Bremen also performed in Army Night, a variety show sponsored by the American Red Cross and held on November 19, 1943, in Reno. The event aimed to raise funds for the Reno Army Air Base Band and featured Bremen as a billed comedian. Press coverage described him as a "talented comedian."

== Film and television career ==
Following the war, Bremen began appearing in film and television. He was often cast in minor or character roles, frequently portraying working-class men such as bartenders, cab drivers, and service workers. His screen work spanned from the 1940s to the 1980s.

== Death ==
Bremen died on March 21, 1986, in Los Angeles, California, at the age of 70. He is interred at Riverside National Cemetery in Riverside, California.

== Selected filmography ==
=== Film ===
- Within These Walls (1945) – Convict in Motor Pool
- Pride of the Marines (1945) – Lenny
- Dark Passage (1947) – Bus Ticket Clerk (uncredited)
- The Man with the Golden Arm (1955) – Taxi Driver in Lock-up (uncredited)
- Attack! (1956) – Mess Sergeant
- The Front Page (1974) – Butch
- Hollywood Harry (1985) – Bartender

=== Television ===
- The Twilight Zone (1963) – Van Man
- Get Smart (1966–1969) – Bartender / Newsdealer / Truck Driver
- Batman (1966) – Benny
- The Addams Family (1964) – Cab Driver
- The Brady Bunch (1971–1974) – Truck Driver / Exterminator
- Diff'rent Strokes (1980–1984) – Mr. Newhouse / Man
- Trapper John, M.D. (1980–1982) – Martinez / Man
