= Shoot-Out at Medicine Bend =

1957 film by Richard L. Bare

- Theatrical release poster
- Directed by: Richard L. Bare
- Written by: John Tucker Battle; D. D. Beauchamp
- Produced by: Richard Whorf
- Starring: Randolph Scott; James Craig; Angie Dickinson
- Cinematography: Carl E. Guthrie
- Edited by: Clarence Kolster
- Music by: Roy Webb
- Production company: Warner Bros. Pictures
- Distributed by: Warner Bros. Pictures
- Release date: May 4, 1957 (US)
- Running time: 87 minutes
- Country: United States
- Language: English

Shoot-Out at Medicine Bend is a 1957 American Western film directed by Richard L. Bare and starring Randolph Scott, James Craig, Angie Dickinson and James Garner.

James Garner, who had a supporting role, said "it was always fun working with Dick Bare, and Randy Scott was an old pro, but the movie isn't worth a damn." This marked the third feature film for James Garner.

== Plot ==
Captain Buck Devlin, and cavalry troopers Sergeant John Maitland and Private Wilbur Clegg, recently mustered out of the army, head to Devlin's brother's homestead to settle down. They arrive just in time to drive off an Indian attack, but are too late to save his brother. Faulty ammunition cost him his life. The three men set out for Medicine Bend to find out who sold the ammunition. The community also gives them all their funds to buy badly needed supplies.

On the way however, they are robbed of everything – the money, their horses, even their uniforms. Fortunately, they happen upon a Brethren (in Christ) congregation (who have also been robbed), and are given spare clothing. Devlin decides it would be a good idea to pretend to be Brethren while in town. They quickly connect the robbers, and later the defective ammunition, to Ep Clark. Clark controls the mayor and the sheriff, and has his gang waylay pioneers heading west and force other local traders out of business.

Devlin has Maitland and Clegg infiltrate Clark's shady business by taking jobs at his store. Meanwhile, he goes to work for defiant competing merchant Elam King and his niece Priscilla. After gaining their trust, Devlin learns that King has a secret wagon train of goods, including weapons, coming in from St. Louis. Devlin starts stealing back Clark's ill-gotten gains at night, including his mother's brooch from saloon girl Nell Garrison, Clark's reluctant girlfriend.

Clark, now suspicious of the three strangers in town, tries to lure Devlin into a trap, but fails and one of Clark's men is killed. He does, however, have the sheriff arrest Maitland and Clegg for the murder of his gang member. They are swiftly sentenced to hang, but Nell has taken a great liking to Maitland and persuades Sheriff Massey to do one right thing in his life and free the prisoners; unfortunately, he is shot in the back by one of Clark's men. Nell then gets Brother Abraham, leader of the local Brethren congregation, to help foil the hanging and rescue the two men.

Devlin finally comes for Clark. They brawl (ironic, given the film's title), and Devlin is briefly knocked unconscious; his life is saved when Clark tries to shoot him with the bad ammunition that had gotten Deviln's brother killed. Clark then grabs a scythe, but is fatally impaled on it when Devlin knocks him down.

Devlin and Maitland prepare to ride into the sunset with Priscilla and Nell respectively. Clegg surprises them by deciding to stay and serve a "hitch" with the Brethren.

== Cast ==
- Randolph Scott as Captain Buck Devlin
- James Craig as Ep Clark
- Angie Dickinson as Priscilla King
- Dani Crayne as Nell Garrison
- James Garner as Sergeant John Maitland
- Gordon Jones as Private Wilbur Clegg
- Trevor Bardette as Sheriff Bob Massey
- Don Beddoe as Mayor Sam Pelley
- Myron Healey as Rafe Sanders, Clark's main henchman
- John Alderson as Clyde Walters, another of Clark's men
- Harry Harvey as Elam King
- Robert Warwick as Brother Abraham
- Richard Bellis as David Devlin
- Ann Doran as Sarah Devlin
- Nancy Kulp as Cleaning Woman

== Reception ==
In Home Media Magazine, Mike Clark wrote:

Truth to tell, there's really no shoot-out in this lukewarm but sporadically ticklish Randolph Scott Western, but you do get a punch-out or two once the baddies start to get theirs in piecemeal fashion in the later reels. Punch-out at Medicine Bend — how would that have looked on the marquee?

Reviewing the film in 2023, Mark Franklin wrote:

The best scenes in the movie occur after our three heroes have been robbed of their clothing and show up at a prairie church meeting wearing nothing but towels, and when Crayne gets Jones drunk in order to find out if he's the religious fanatic he pretends to be.
