= Dragnet (1951 TV series) =

Original 1951–1959 TV series

- DVD cover
- Also known as: Badge 714
- Created by: Jack Webb
- Starring: Jack Webb; Ben Alexander
- Narrated by: Hal Gibney; John Stephenson; George Fenneman; Jack Webb
- Opening theme: "Dragnet Theme"
- Composers: Walter Schumann (1951–58); Nathan Scott (1958–59)
- Country of origin: United States
- Original language: English
- No. of seasons: 8
- No. of episodes: 276 (list of episodes)

Production
- Executive producers: Jack Webb; Michael Meshekoff
- Producers: Jack Webb; Michael Meshekoff
- Production locations: Los Angeles, U.S.
- Running time: 30 minutes
- Production companies: Mark VII Productions (1951–54); Mark VII Limited (1954–59)

Original release
- Network: NBC
- Release: December 14, 1951 – August 23, 1959

Related
- Dragnet (franchise)

Dragnet – later syndicated as Badge 714 – is an American crime television series, based on the radio series of the same name, both created by their star, Jack Webb. The shows take their name from the police term dragnet, a system of coordinated measures for apprehending criminals or suspects. Webb reprised his radio role of Los Angeles police detective Sergeant Joe Friday. Ben Alexander co-starred as Friday's partner, Officer Frank Smith.

The ominous, four-note introduction to the brass and tympani theme music (titled "Danger Ahead"), composed by Walter Schumann, is instantly recognizable. It is derived from Miklós Rózsa's score for the 1946 film The Killers.

This was the first television series in the Dragnet media franchise encompassing film, television, books and comics. The series was filmed at Walt Disney Studios in Burbank, California.

== History ==
During its early success on radio, Dragnet was popular enough to move to television. More important was that it brought continuity between the television and radio series, using the same script devices and many of the same actors. Liggett & Myers sponsored Dragnet, both on radio and on TV, during the 1950s, with Webb seen smoking Chesterfields.

Webb was comfortable playing Joe Friday on radio but balked at the prospect of playing the role before the cameras; according to author-biographer Michael J. Hayde, Webb's choice for the TV Joe Friday was Hollywood actor Lloyd Nolan, whose casual underplaying Webb admired. But Webb was too well established in the radio Dragnet and the network insisted that he continue in the leading role.

The two familiar leads, Jack Webb and Barton Yarborough, settled in for the first season, disrupted when Yarborough suffered a fatal heart attack. Under Webb's authority, the writing staff worked his partner's demise into the storyline, and Sgt. Friday rode with various partners until settling on Ben Alexander as detective Frank Smith, providing some sporadic comic relief. Most of the episodes available to viewers today feature Webb and Alexander. Alexander was also an occasional writer on the show.

== Characters ==
- Sgt. (later Lt.) Joe Friday (Jack Webb): The focal character, who narrates all episodes. Friday is a dedicated police officer, and pretty much a straight-arrow type, though occasional flashes of a dry, mordant sense of humor show through. He can be sympathetic towards victims, or even towards some criminals whose crimes are a result of difficult circumstances, but he has little patience with those he thinks are lying to him. His personal life is rarely discussed, but he lives with his mother and is known to date infrequently. Friday is promoted to lieutenant in season 8.
- Sgt. Ben Romero (Barton Yarborough): Friday's original partner. Married, but not much else is revealed about him. Romero is only seen in the first two episodes, as actor Yarborough died unexpectedly shortly after completing his second episode. An episode in which Friday deals with Romero's offstage death takes place early in the second season. In terms of series continuity, this episode can be assumed to take place directly after episode two, though it was not filmed or shown until numerous other episodes had been completed and aired.
- Sgt. Ed Jacobs (Barney Phillips): Friday's partner in episodes 4–14. (Friday had a one-shot partner in episode 3.) The slight, bow-tied and bespectacled Jacobs was generally taciturn, focused and far more serious than his eventual replacement.
- Officer (later Sgt.) Frank Smith (Herb Ellis, then Ben Alexander): Friday's partner from early in season 2. After a very few episodes with Ellis as Smith, Alexander took over, essentially defining the role through the rest of the series. A dedicated and competent officer, Frank Smith also serves as light comic relief, as many episodes feature a moment or two with Frank wryly discussing a minor inconvenience or small triumph in his life. Amongst the many recurring discussion topics are Frank's generally warm but occasionally comically-strained relationship with his wife Fay; his sincere but sometimes bumbling attempts to relate to his children; his pride in his cooking (especially his "famous" omelettes); his somewhat dubious health advice; and his long-running frustration with his mooching, ne'er-do-well brother-in-law Armand. (Frank's family were rarely seen on the show, and Armand was never seen; they remained oft-discussed, mostly offstage characters.) Despite the humorous nature of Frank's comic asides, though, he is shown to be hard-working and effective as an officer, and his occasional "friendly chatterbox" routine is quickly (and willingly) put aside whenever there is serious work to tackle. Smith is promoted to sergeant in season 8.
- Lt. Lee Jones (Herb Butterfield): Seen only in season 1, Lt. Jones works as part of LAPD's crime lab. He is seen in several first season episodes examining crime scenes and performing detailed forensic investigations. Though mentioned after season 1, Jones became an offstage character as the series progressed, and was essentially replaced as an on-camera character by Ray Pinker, below. Jones was based on the real-life assistant commander of the Scientific Investigation Division, of the same name.
- Ray Pinker (Olan Soule): After being seen in two first-season episodes as Sgt. Harlan Stall (a precinct co-worker), beginning in season 2, Olan Soule took on the role of Ray Pinker. Pinker was based on the LAPD's real-life forensic chemist of the same name. Pinker is seen in numerous episodes from seasons 2 through 8, helping to examine crime scenes and offering various forensically obtained clues to the detectives.
- Ann Baker (Dorothy Abbott): Joe Friday's occasionally-glimpsed girlfriend, seen in seasons 2 and 3.
- Detective Lopez (George Sawaya): A rarely seen Hispanic detective. His first appearance was in "The Big September Man".
- Capt. Harry Didion (Art Gilmore): Friday and Smith rotated through various departments from episode to episode. When they were posted to Robbery detail, seen occasionally in seasons 2 to 5 was the captain of that department, the milk-drinking Harry Didion. The milk-drinking was suggestive of an ulcer, perhaps due to the pressures of the job, but Didion (based on a real LAPD captain of the same name) did not show any weakness or indecision in the performance of his duties. In his first appearance, Didion was played by Dan Riss; Gilmore quickly assumed the role thereafter.

Captains of other divisions had consistent names, but they were seen infrequently—and on the rare occasions they were present on-screen, their performers changed from episode to episode. Thad Brown was the chief of detectives (played by Raymond Burr in the pilot, thereafter by several other one-shot actors); R. A. Lohrman was the head of the homicide squad. Both Brown and Lohrman were based on, and named for, their real-life LAPD counterparts.

== Writing staff and production ==
The template for the TV show was simply the proven radio formula, embellished with visuals. Most early episodes were directly adapted from earlier Dragnet radio shows, and writer James E. Moser wrote the vast majority of the show's episodes through the end of 1954. Webb directed every episode of Dragnet, and was also an occasional writer on the show, writing or co-writing 14 episodes (mostly in the early seasons).

While working on the radio drama, Webb formed a friendship with LAPD chief William Parker, and agreed to allow the police department to censor Dragnet in exchange for story ideas. Scripts were formally approved by the LAPD's Public Information Division before filming, with episodes potentially being discarded entirely if the department objected to an aspect of the script. The LAPD then gave Webb story ideas and financial help, such as actual police vehicles and equipment for props and real police officers as extras.

John Robinson joined the writing staff in 1953, and by 1955 (after Moser left the show for a time to create and run the TV series Medic), Robinson became Dragnet's most frequent script contributor. Note that despite some sources claiming that Robinson was a pen-name of Jack Webb, it was not; Robinson was a separate individual with a long and well-documented scriptwriting career. (Webb, whose full legal name was "John Randolph Webb", did occasionally write under the similar pen name of "John Randolph".) Frank Burt joined the staff in 1955, and along with Robinson wrote most of the mid-period Dragnet episodes. Moser returned for the final two seasons, while Robinson and Burt reduced their participation in these final years. (Burt died in May 1958; scripts he wrote appeared through 1959.) Overall, well over 200 of the 276 episodes of Dragnet were written (or co-written) by at least one of Moser, Robinson or Burt. There were other less frequent contributors; co-star Ben Alexander co-wrote six episodes (all in season 3), and Michael Cramoy was a frequent writer in seasons 6 through 8, penning over 20 episodes. Amongst the handful of writers who wrote only an episode or two, two notable Star Trek writers caught an early break, each writing a very late-running Dragnet installment: Gene L. Coon and John Meredyth Lucas.

The 1950s Dragnet episodes in black-and-white differ significantly from the 1960s Dragnet episodes in color. This first TV series took a documentary approach, with Sgt. Friday and the police force often encountering the seedy side of Los Angeles, with a steady succession of callous fugitives, desperate gunmen, slippery swindlers, and hard bitten women. Most of the cast members were veteran radio actors who could be relied upon to read the matter-of-fact dialogue naturally. Webb used most of his ensemble players again and again in different roles: Harry Bartell, Clarence Cassell, Virginia Christine, Herb Ellis, Eddie Firestone, Kathleen Freeman, Art Gilmore, Virginia Gregg, Stacy Harris, Carolyn Jones (then billed as Caroline Jones), Jack Kruschen, Peter Leeds, Natalie Masters, Ralph Moody, Vic Perrin, Barney Phillips, Sarah Selby, Olan Soule, Herb Vigran, Peggy Webber, and many others. Martin Milner and Lee Marvin made one of their earliest TV appearances on the series; and at the time, going against type playing heavies, Raymond Burr (billed as Ray Burr) appeared in the series' first episode, as Sgt. Friday's superior, Captain Thad Mumford. Webb staged each story with newsreel-like authenticity, enhancing the visual action with extremely tight close-ups (unheard of in the days of tiny television screens), location photography, and unusual camera angles. Much of this inventiveness went unused in the 1960s revival. Although still using convincing dialogue readings, the new Dragnet lost much of the documentary appearance, and film noir ambience.

Just before the show took its final commercial break, the show's announcer would inform the audience of something related to the case, usually the opening date on which the perpetrator's trial would take place in the Los Angeles County Superior Court (this would be accompanied by an onscreen card so the viewer could read along). After the break the camera faded in for what was presumably the perpetrator's mug shot, consisting of the perpetrator standing uncomfortably against the wall, while the results of the trial, including the sentencing, were announced. The perpetrator's name and fate were then superimposed over the screen. In most cases, this superimposed material specifically stated in what prison the perpetrator had been incarcerated, or, in the case of perpetrators deemed unfit to stand trial, to what state mental hospital or psychiatric facility they were committed. Occasionally, there were multiple perpetrators. Usually all would be shown at once during this closing sequence, but sometimes some perps would be shown separately, particularly if they received different sentencing from others in the group.

In rare cases, where the perpetrator was found guilty of murder and the death penalty was applied, the place and method of execution was noted on screen. In even rarer cases, such as in the episodes "The Big Show" or "The Big Little Jesus", there was no trial. In the episode "The Big Little Jesus", the content of the episode made it clear that no trial was to be held, and there was no final announcement. In the very rare other Dragnet episodes that did not result in a trial, the narrator would briefly explain why there was no trial, and the on-screen superimposition would describe the fate of the episode's perpetrator.

While one early episode of Dragnet centered around a criminal who was found "not guilty" by a jury at the start of the episode, no episode ended with a perpetrator caught by Friday and his partner being found "not guilty" by a court.

== Episodes ==
Season	Episodes	Originally released	
Season	Episodes	First released	Last released
1	14	December 14, 1951	June 20, 1952
2	33	September 12, 1952	June 26, 1953
3	39	September 4, 1953	May 28, 1954
4	39	August 27, 1954	May 27, 1955
5	39	September 2, 1955	June 1, 1956
6	34	September 24, 1956	May 23, 1957
7	39	September 26, 1957	June 26, 1958
8	39	September 23, 1958	August 23, 1959

=== Broadcast history ===
- January 3, 1952 – December 29, 1955: Thursday at 9:00 pm on NBC
- January 5, 1956 – June 26, 1958: Thursday at 8:30 pm on NBC
- September 23, 1958 – April 28, 1959: Tuesday at 7:30 pm on NBC
- July 7, 1959 – August 23, 1959: Sunday at 8:30 pm on NBC

=== Ratings ===
- October 1951 – April 1952: #20/36.3 (tied with All Star Revue)
- October 1952 – April 1953: #4/46.8
- October 1953 – April 1954: #2/53.2
- October 1954 – April 1955: #3/42.1
- October 1955 – April 1956: #8/35.0
- October 1956 – April 1957: #11/32.1
- October 1957 – April 1958: Not in the Top 30
- October 1958 – April 1959: Not in the Top 30

== Preservation status ==
Over 200 of the 276 episodes of Dragnet have not seen broadcast since the late 1960s, or received any kind of home video or DVD release. It is unclear if these 'missing' episodes are lost, destroyed, or are being withheld from distribution for some reason. Approximately 64 episodes of Dragnet are known to exist in some form or another, including episodes held in the collection of The Paley Center for Media.

== DVD releases ==
Half of the episodes of this series are in the public domain, with an estimated fifty-two episodes released on many DVD labels. A number of these collections recycle the same fifty-two episodes. Often some are mislabeled as there are no onscreen titles; as well, many episodes are sourced from film prints which are somewhat damaged, worn, or faded.

Eclectic DVD released a collection of three episodes.

Platinum Video released seven episodes from the original series in 2002. The two disc set also includes episodes from Burke's Law; Peter Gunn; Richard Diamond, Private Detective; Mr. Wong, Detective; and Bulldog Drummond.

== General and cited sources ==
- Jason Mittell (2004). Genre and Television: From Cop Shows to Cartoons in American Culture. Routledge. ISBN 0-415-96903-4.
