= Alfred Hitchcock Presents season 1 =

Alfred Hitchcock Presents aired 39 episodes during its first season from 1955 to 1956. Alfred Hitchcock Presents was nominated for the Primetime Emmy Award for Best Action or Adventure Series at the 8th Primetime Emmy Awards on March 17, 1956.

== Episodes ==
No. overall	No. in season	Title	Directed by	Written by	Stars	Original release date
1	1	"Revenge"	Alfred Hitchcock	Story by : Samuel Blas; Teleplay by : Francis Cockrell	Ralph Meeker as Carl Spann, Vera Miles as Elsa Spann	October 2, 1955
Carl Spann (Meeker) wakes up early for his first day at a new job. Neighbor Mrs. Fergusen offers to take his wife Elsa to market, as Elsa has nothing to do in their new location by the sea, having been advised by doctors to take a break after having to retire from her career as professional ballerina due to a nervous breakdown. While Carl is at work, Elsa is apparently attacked and left traumatized by an intruder, claiming to be a salesman, in their trailer park home, as Carl comes home to a burning cake and Elsa in a state of shock. After reporting it to police officers, two lieutenants take over handling the case. After talking to Elsa's doctor, Carl decides to take Elsa on a vacation. Later, while driving in town, Elsa points out a man in a gray suit as her attacker. Seeking revenge, an enraged Carl follows the man and kills him in his hotel room with a wrench, and a maid quickly finds the body. However, a little later Elsa, still mentally disturbed, identifies another man as her attacker, leading Carl to realize, too late, that he might have killed an innocent man, just as the police close in on them. Elsa is taken away to a mental hospital while Carl is tried, convicted, and sentenced to prison for taking the law into his own hands. Supporting cast: Frances Bavier as Mrs. Fergusen, John Gallaudet as Doctor, Ray Teal as Police Lieutenant, Herbert Lytton as Police Lieutenant, Ray Montgomery as Man in Gray Suit, Norman Willis as Cop, John Daheim (credited as John Day) as Cop, Lillian O'Malley as Hotel Maid
2	2	"Premonition"	Robert Stevens	Harold Swanton	John Forsythe as Kim Stanger, Warren Stevens as Perry Stanger, Cloris Leachman as Susan Stanger	October 9, 1955
Musician Kim Stanger (Forsythe) returns home to the U.S. after four years in Rome and Paris, hoping to reunite with his estranged father, Greg, who has not answered any of his letters. After being dropped off by local cabbie Mason, he runs into old acquaintance Douglas Irwin, his sister-in-law's father, who is quite surprised to see him and tries to get Kim to call his family first. Upon returning home, he learns that his father died four years ago of a heart attack on the tennis court, a fact that his brother Perry and sister-in-law Susan did not tell him. Kim suspects foul play, as Perry inherited everything in the will and Kim finds a hunting license dated after Greg supposedly died that October, so he inquires with Irwin, who says that Perry just got the date wrong. Kim then goes to see a cemetery official, Gerald Eaton, whom he pressures to let him see the body, Eaton admitting that there is no body in the coffin. Next, Kim sees the coroner, Isaiah Dobbs, who claims ignorance because the former coroner retired, stating that three men (Greg, Irwin, and Greg's son) went hunting, and only two returned alive. Kim eventually learns from Susan that he is the one who killed his father, and he did so during that hunting trip, after which the family staged the incident and bribed people to make it look like an accident. He has been in an Arizona mental hospital for four years and his memories of Paris are just a delusion. Supporting cast: George MacReady as Douglas Irwin, Percy Helton as Gerald Eaton, Paul Brinegar as Mason, Harry Tyler as Isaiah Dobbs
3	3	"Triggers in Leash"	Don Medford	Story by : Allen Vaughn Elston; Teleplay by : Dick Carr	Ellen Corby as Old Maggie Ryan, Gene Barry as Del Delaney, Darren McGavin as Red Hillman	October 16, 1955
Old Maggie Ryan promises to fix a wonderful meal for Ben Morgan if he will get to work during a very rainy day. Cowboy Dell Delaney arrives shortly afterward, desiring a warm respite from the storm, and proceeds to scare the life out of Ben by drawing his gun on him when Ben brings in some firewood. Another cowboy, Red Hillman, soon shows up at Old Maggie's roadhouse, and the two cowboys threaten a shoot-out over a poker game and intoxication from the night before. Maggie, widow to a renowned gunfighter, does her best to negotiate a peace, threatening to tell the sheriff that whoever shoots first is a murderer, and she eventually convinces them to only shoot each other when the clock strikes. All she requests is to hold the giant cross that her husband gave her on their wedding day, which sits next to the clock on the shelf. When the clock mysteriously stops, the men take it to be a sign from God and leave peacefully. Ben explains the clock stops as it is the cross that keeps the shelf level, enabling the clock to function properly. Supporting cast: Casey MacGregor as Ben Morgan
4	4	"Don't Come Back Alive"	Robert Stevenson	Robert Dennis	Sidney Blackmer as Frank Partridge	October 23, 1955
Financially strapped couple Frank and Mildred Partridge scheme to have Mildred "disappear" for seven years and be declared legally dead in order to collect Mildred's $25,000 life insurance policy. Frank got a sales job, but it won't start until next month, and bills are due. They rush to take Mildred to the bus station to "disappear", as Mildred's sister Lucy will soon stop by to pick up Mildred. Insurance investigator Mr. Kettle suspects that Frank killed Mildred, and his constant hounding of Frank means that the couple must not be in contact with each other. They have to carefully meet at the local library and avoid being seen by the librarian, and Frank suggests that Mildred go to San Francisco. Two days before the seven years is up, Frank is visited by Mildred, who has moved on with her life. She wants a divorce and an end to the scheme, and she is willing to pay off Frank for $1500. In a rage, Frank bludgeons her to death and buries her in his garden. On the seventh anniversary, as Frank is going to court, Kettle returns to congratulate Frank for "winning" and offers to help him with his garden. Supporting cast: Virginia Gregg as Mildred Partridge, Robert Emhardt as Mr. Kettle, Irene Tedrow as Lucy, Edna Holland as Librarian
5	5	"Into Thin Air" "The Vanishing Lady"	Don Medford	Marian Cockrell	Pat Hitchcock as Diana Winthrop	October 30, 1955
British Mrs. Winthrop and her daughter Diana are on their way home from India via France, and check into a Paris hotel when finally given a room by the clerk. Mrs. Winthrop falls suddenly ill while the bellhop, porter, and maid check them in their room, and the hotel doctor sends Diana to his home for medicine from his wife. When Diana returns, the front-desk clerk and other hotel employees profess to have no recollection of her, nor is there any record that the Winthrops were ever there. Diana goes to the embassy and speaks with the ambassador, Sir Everett, but her story is believed only by Basil Farnham. Basil sends an administrator, Maris, to check on the basic details given by Diana and Basil examines the "medicine" only to find it is actually Vittel water, which Diana had to wait two hours to receive. The doctor's wife claimed to have no telephone, but Diana heard it ring upon leaving. Diana and Basil go back to the hotel and demand to see the room, which is very different from Diana's precise description, but Diana decides to stay there after seeing a painter in the lobby. She asks to see the room in question and rips off the new wallpaper, proving that there is a conspiracy at hand. The cover-up is revealed by Sir Everett to have been set in place by the French government, because Mrs. Winthrop, who is now dead, had the bubonic plague. Based on the Legend of the Vanishing Lady. Supporting cast: Mary Forbes as Mrs. Herbert Winthrop, Alan Napier as Sir Everett, Geoffrey Toone as Basil Farnham, Michael Hadlow as Maris, Maurice Marsac as Hotel Clerk, John Mylong as the Hotel Doctor, Ann Codee as Doctor's Wife, Albert d'Arno as Bellhop, Peter Camlin as Porter, Gerry Gaylor as Maid, Jack Chefe as Detective
6	6	"Salvage"	Justus Addiss	Story by : Fred Freiberger; Teleplay by : Fred Freiberger & Dick Carr	Gene Barry as Dan Varrel, Nancy Gates as Lois Williams	November 6, 1955
Lois Williams goes to a high-class bar and fends off a drunk in order to get the bartender to find Lou Henry, as she expects recently released convict Dan Varrel to kill her as revenge for her causing his brother Ritchie's death by giving police robbery evidence and Ritchie's location. Then she goes to see her ex-boyfriend Tim Grady and confesses her fear, which he rejects as hysterics, though he offers to pay her way back home to Springfield, Massachusetts. When Dan visits her apartment later, he is surprised when Lois refuses to put up a fight and shows no fear, as she believes that she has nothing to live for and no one to turn to. When he says that he would be doing her a favor by killing her, he seemingly has a change of heart and offers her a business deal to help him look legitimate to the police. Lois sets up a boutique, hiring Mary, Hilda, and a model. To help fund the shop, Dan visits Lou for a loan of $5000. There, he receives a lot of criticism from fellow criminal Shorty for working with Lois. After months of hard work, the dress shop is launched successfully, and Lois and Dan celebrate with a big party. Dan also convinces money-hungry Tim to reconcile with her under the belief that she is now wealthy, and Tim proposes. Lois, now happy and full of life, expresses her gratitude, but Dan reveals that he did all of it so that Lois would not want to die. Now he can kill her with satisfaction, which he does by shooting her to death the moment he's done talking. Supporting cast: Peter Adams as Tim Grady, Paul Bryar as Lou Henry, Elisha Cook Jr. as Shorty, Maxine Cooper as Mary, Edit Angold as Hilda, Virginia Christine as Model, Billy Wayne as Bartender, Ralph Montgomery as Drunk, Franklyn Farnum as Party Guest (uncredited), Ralph Brooks as Party Guest (uncredited)
7	7	"Breakdown"	Alfred Hitchcock	Story by : Louis Pollock; Teleplay by : Francis Cockrell & Louis Pollock	Joseph Cotten as William Callew	November 13, 1955
Cynical movie producer William Callew dictates a letter to his secretary while relaxing in the sun with friend Ed Johnson. Callew fires a long-time employee, Hubka, over the phone and scoffs at his crying. Later while driving on a rural detour, Callew gets into a car accident and is completely paralyzed (other than being able to move his left pinky finger) after crashing into a prison guard and multiple vehicles. He is robbed by escaped convicts who leave him for dead. Finally, the sheriff arrives after catching a prisoner. At the morgue, worker Lloyd and the ambulance driver discuss the escape, and the coroner and his assistant order William to be left for the night. Just when Callew is about to be declared legally dead, he gets the attention of Dr. Harner and his friend Chessy with his tears. Supporting cast: Raymond Bailey as Ed Johnson, Forrest Stanley as Hubka, Harry Shannon as Dr. Harner, Murray Alper as Lloyd, Marvin Press as Chessy, Lane Chandler as Sheriff, James Edwards as Convict, Aaron Spelling as Road Worker Convict, Harry Landers as Coroner, Jimmy Weldon as Guard, Mike Ragan as Escaped Convict, Elzie Emanuel as Black Escaped Convict, Ralph Peters as the Coroner's Assistant, Richard Newton as Ambulance Driver
8	8	"Our Cook's a Treasure"	Robert Stevens	Story by : Dorothy L. Sayers; Teleplay by : Robert C. Dennis	Everett Sloane as Ralph Montgomery, Beulah Bondi as Mrs. Sutton	November 20, 1955
With a serial-murderer maid called Mrs. Andrews on the loose in the city, Ralph Montgomery becomes suspicious of his and his actress wife Ethel's housemaid, Mrs. Sutton. Ralph talks about major news with co-worker Earl Kramer while walking to work. When Ralph gets violent cramps at work while dictating a letter to his secretary, his co-worker George Brooks suggests that he go see a doctor. He becomes even more concerned while playing cards with friends Earl, George, and Dr. Pritchard. When he finds a can of arsenic in his garage, he has his cocoa analyzed by a chemist, and it turns out to contain arsenic in quantities that would not be immediately fatal but lethal over one week's time. Ralph gets his secretary to find a picture of the wanted poisoner and believes that it could be a younger Mrs. Sutton. Ralph, therefore, blames Mrs. Sutton and fires her before reading in the newspaper that the serial murderer has been caught in Queens, New York. However, Mrs. Sutton confesses to him her unhappiness at having had to lie for Ethel, who is having an affair with her co-star in a local theatre club production. Ethel, unaware of what Ralph has learned, offers him a cup of cocoa that she made for him. Supporting cast: Janet Ward as Ethel Montgomery, Elliott Reid as Earl Kramer, Gavin Gordon as George Brooks, Walter Woolf King as Dr. Pritchard, Doris Singleton as Secretary, Olan Soulé as Chemist
9	9	"The Long Shot"	Robert Stevenson	Harold Swanton	Peter Lawford as Charles 'Charlie' Ffolliot Raymond, John Williams as Walker Hendricks/English Jim	November 27, 1955
Charlie Raymond, an American immigrant from Britain, owes $4,200 to his bookie Dutch, so he skips town and answers a newspaper ad placed by Walker Hendricks, who wants a fellow Londoner to drive him to San Francisco. On the trip, Charlie is visited by bookie Tommy Dewitt, who tells him that he must proceed to Florida for a "sure thing". Charlie does not have enough money to place the bet, so he goes to steal Hendricks' money from their hotel room, but in his search he finds a letter from attorney Matthew Kelson, indicating that Walker is on his way to claim an inheritance of $200,000 from a family he has never met. When they reach Salt Lake City, Charlie tests his ability to assume Hendricks' identity by visiting Hendricks' aunt Margaret Stoddard. Charlie kills Walker by driving over him in the Nevada desert at night and presents Walker's documents at Kelson's office. San Francisco Homicide Police Sergeant Mack steps forward to arrest Charlie, revealing that they were aware of Hendricks's death and the meeting was a sting operation. Charlie confesses all the details, but Mack is surprised when he mentions Nevada, since Walker Hendricks was shot and killed in New York City and thrown in the East River. The man whom Charlie killed was "English Jim", a con man who had also been after the inheritance. He employed Charlie in order to get updated on London affairs so that he could better impersonate Hendricks. Supporting cast: Charlie Cantor as Tommy DeWitt, Gertrude Hoffman as Margaret Stoddard, Robert Warwick as Matthew Kelson, Frank Gerstle as Police Sergeant Mack, Virginia Christine as Secretary, Tim Graham as Bartender Previously an episode of Suspense (broadcast 31 January 1946).
10	10	"The Case of Mr. Pelham"	Alfred Hitchcock	Story by : Anthony Armstrong; Teleplay by : Francis Cockrell	Tom Ewell as Albert Pelham (both real and fake)	December 4, 1955
Albert Pelham, a successful businessman, tells Dr. Harley he has a double who is slowly taking over his life. Friends and employees have recounted his doing things he knows he did not do in places where he was not present. Work being completed by Pelham without his knowledge matches his distinctive style, and his signature is copied. With the support of Harley, Pelham varies his schedule and buys a one-of-a-kind necktie from a salesman in the hopes of foiling his double's efforts at duplicating him. Upon returning to work, Miss Clement brings him documents containing his new signature, which he just started using. Pelham calls home and the double answers. When he returns home, his double is there. The double argues that Pelham must be the imposter because he is wearing the different tie and acting in an unhinged manner. Pelham's manservant Peterson agrees with the double's conclusion, causing Pelham to have a mental breakdown. The impostor Pelham takes over Pelham's life, while the real Pelham is taken away to a lunatic asylum. Supporting cast: Raymond Bailey as Dr. Harley, John Compton as Vincent, Justice Watson as Henry Peterson, Kirby Smith as Tom Mason, Kay Stewart as Miss Clement, Jan Arvan as Harry the Club Attendant, Diane Brewster as Secretary, Norman Willis as Bartender, Richard Collier as Tie Salesman, Tim Graham as Lawyer Alfred Hitchcock was nominated for the Primetime Emmy Award for Best Director for a Film Series for this episode at the 8th Primetime Emmy Awards on March 17, 1956.
11	11	"Guilty Witness"	Robert Stevens	Story by : Morris Hershman; Teleplay by : Robert C. Dennis	Judith Evelyn as Amelia Verber, Joseph Mantell as Stanley Crane, Kathleen Maguire as Dorothy Crane	December 11, 1955
Stanley and Dorothy Crane live in the apartment below volatile couple Amelia and Ben Verber. While serving her in his shop, Ben notices bruises on Dorothy. Following a particularly loud fight, Ben goes missing, and Dorothy pushes Stanley to find out more. Sergeant Halloran, a homicide detective, shows up at the Cranes' apartment and says that he is investigating the disappearance of Ben. Stanley helps Sergeant Halloran's investigation, and they break into the Verbers' apartment, but cannot find a body. Dorothy is passionately insistent to Stanley that Amelia killed Ben, even though Stanley is told by Amelia that Ben is staying with his parents in Queens. Dorothy calls Ben's parents, who deny having seen him. Sergeant Halloran and Stanley discover Ben's body in Amelia's baby carriage in the basement. Amelia confesses she killed Ben because Ben was about to leave her and the children for a woman he was having an affair with: Dorothy. Supporting cast: Robert Simon as Detective Sergeant Halloran, Ed Kemmer as Ben Verber, Laiola Wendorff as Mrs. Glavetsky, Grazia Narciso as Mrs. Santini
12	12	"Santa Claus and the Tenth Avenue Kid"	Don Weis	Story by : Margaret Cousins; Teleplay by : Marian Cockrell	Barry Fitzgerald as Harold "Stretch" Sears	December 18, 1955
Disgruntled ex-con Harold "Stretch" Sears is hired as a department store Santa for $10 per day plus lunch thanks to his parole officer Clementine Webster. Sears loathes the job, as he dislikes the children. His attention is caught by a cynical poor boy who wants a toy plane that is not for sale, being part of the store decorations. The boy believes that Santa is not real. Sears becomes irate when he discovers Webster had his earnings directly deposited into a savings account, preventing him from spending them on alcohol. Sears steals the toy to give it to the cynical boy for Christmas, thinking that getting something nice may prevent the child from going down the same path he took. Sears is caught by the police after leaving the boy's apartment home, but Webster understands Sears' intent and convinces the police to let the matter go after Sears agrees to pay for the toy. Supporting cast: Virginia Gregg as Clementine Webster, Bobby Clark as 10th Avenue Kid, Arthur Space as Mr. Chambers the Parole Officer, Betty Harford as Doris, Justice Watson as Mr. Shaw (the Store Manager), Tyler McVey as Security Guard, Norman Willis as Man with Toy Plane, Alan Reynolds as Police Sergeant, Mimi Gibson as First Girl in line to see Santa, Gary Hunley as Boy, Anthony Blankley as Boy, Butch Bernard as Boy, Wendy Winkleman as Girl, Noel Green, Harrison Lewis
13	13	"The Cheney Vase"	Robert Stevens	Robert Blees	Patricia Collinge as Martha Cheney, Darren McGavin as Lyle Endicott	December 25, 1955
Lyle Endicott is fired by his boss, Herbert Koether. Lyle worms his way into the good graces of Martha Cheney, a rich, invalid woman with a penchant for sculpture. Lyle hopes to obtain her Cheney vase, which will fetch a high price on the market. Lyle gets his girlfriend Pamela Waring to forge a letter from Koether pushing for him to work for Martha. Lyle methodically cuts Martha off from the world, tricking her into sending the maid Bella on vacation by framing Bella for breaking items. He hires a new maid, Ruby Boyenton, to take the place of Bella, whom he fired, while telling Martha that Bella quit. Lyle cuts off the telephone, so Martha futilely begs Ruby to help her. Lyle tells Pamela the vase is in a safety deposit box, in order to cut her out of her share while he flees abroad to Frankfurt. Pamela sees through his lies and warns Koether and the authorities about his plan. Lyle rushes to Martha's gallery to take the vase but discovers that Martha has made five copies of the vase, and he is unable to identify the correct one. To add insult to injury, Martha plans to sell the forgeries to various overseas sellers for large sums, and Lyle will not be allowed a cut of the profits. Supporting cast: Carolyn Jones as Pamela Waring, George Macready as Herbert Koether, Ruta Lee as Ruby Boyenton, Kathryn Card as Bella
14	14	"A Bullet for Baldwin"	Justus Addiss	Story by : Joseph Ruscoll; Teleplay by : Eustace and Francis Cockrell	John Qualen as Mr. Benjamin Stepp	January 1, 1956
When middle-aged Mr. Stepp is fired from an investment banking company after a string of recent mistakes, he shoots his boss Nathaniel Baldwin and leaves, telling the janitor not to bother Baldwin. On Monday morning, Stepp is awakened by a phone call from Baldwin's secretary Abigail Wilson, who tells him to report to the office immediately, as he is late for work. Stepp is surprised when Baldwin is at work, acting as though nothing happened. The gun he shot Baldwin with is still fully loaded and has no smell to indicate a recent discharge. Baldwin's partner, Walter King, convinces Stepp that he hallucinated the shooting due to overwork, and should hire an assistant. King, however, has actually hired a look-alike actor named Davidson to take Baldwin's place. King tells Davidson that Baldwin had a stroke and is vacationing with his wife in their cabin, which is the reasoning for his hire. Davidson does not believe a man who just had a stroke would vacation in a cabin and figures out Baldwin has been killed. King admits he witnessed Stepps' action and feared he would be a suspect, since he is having an affair with Baldwin's wife. He offers Davidson more money for his role. Mrs. Baldwin is going to claim Baldwin died of a stroke and burn their cabin down to destroy the evidence of his corpse. Fearing Stepp may tell someone about the shooting, King fires him, claiming that Stepp imagined the conversation where he authorized the new assistant. In anger, Stepp shoots and kills King, and then calmly leaves, believing this to be just another hallucination. Supporting cast: Sebastian Cabot as Nathaniel Baldwin/Davidson, Philip Reed as Walter King, Cheryll Clarke as Miss Abigail Wilson the Secretary, James Adamson as Janitor, Kate Drain Lawson as Landlady, Don McArt as Albert, Robert Patten (credited as Bob Patten) as Detective, Ruth Lee as Neighbor, Arthur Gilmour as Neighbor, David Dwight as Fireman The actors who played Mrs. Baldwin and the actors at the financial meeting are uncredited. Don McArt, Robert Patten, Ruth Lee, Arthur Gilmore, and David Dwight do not appear in the episode, though they are all credited, suggesting deleted scenes.
15	15	"The Big Switch"	Don Weis	Story by : Cornell Woolrich; Teleplay by : Richard Carr	George Mathews as Sam Dunleavy, Beverly Michaels as Goldie	January 8, 1956
Police Lieutenant Al Hawkshaw visits his old schoolmate, gangster Sam Dunleavy, to tell him he suspects the reason Sam returned to Chicago is to murder his ex-girlfriend, Goldie, for having an affair with Morgan, and that he will be keeping an eye on him. Sam pays his close friend, speakeasy owner Barney, to arrange an alibi for Goldie's murder. Barney stages a game of poker in his backroom, with waiter Tony to witness the two. Sam sneaks out through the fake phonebooth, but he finds himself unable to kill Goldie when she claims that she has a baby (named Dunleavy) and is married to Morgan, who is in Cleveland. Sam offers to take Goldie shopping the next day to get items for the baby. "Baby", however, is actually a revolver that Morgan uses for robberies. Barney accidentally shoots himself while cleaning a gun. Sam hears the shot and rushes to Barney's aid, but Barney is dead, and Sam is arrested for murder by Al. Thanks to the arrangements Sam paid for, witnesses will testify that Sam was alone with Barney at the time of the shooting. Supporting cast: Joe Downing (credited as Joseph Downing) as Lieutenant Al Hawkshaw, George E. Stone as Barney, James Edwards as Ed, Napoleon Whiting as Tony, Mark Dana as Morgan
16	16	"You Got to Have Luck"	Robert Stevens	Story by : S. R. Ross; Teleplay by : Eustace & Francis Cockrell	John Cassavetes as Sam Cobbett, Marisa Pavan as Mary Schaffner	January 15, 1956
Sam Cobbett breaks out of prison while serving four consecutive 99-year sentences by hiding in a laundry basket. Warden Jacobs and his secretary fend off the media and begin a pursuit via helicopter. Cobbett enters the Schaffner house while David Schaffner is at work and makes his wife Mary cook for him, pretend that everything is okay over the phone when her mother calls, and curtly dismiss her neighbors Maude and Susie Martin when they come by. Cobbett believes that he can take his time, so he shaves, showers, and changes clothes. However, a prison guard and the warden arrive to arrest him. They were tipped off by Mary's mother; Mary is deaf and would not have answered the phone or been able to hear her mother's questions. Cobbett did not realize Mary was deaf due to her exceptional skills with lip reading. Supporting cast: Lamont Johnson as David Schaffner, Ray Teal as Warden Jacobs, Vivi Janiss as Maude Martin, Robert Patten (credited as Bob Patten) as Willis the Co-Pilot, Wendy Winkleman as Susie Martin, Hal K. Dawson as Secretary, Steven Clark as Pilot, Bill Pullen as Prison Guard
17	17	"The Older Sister"	Robert Stevens	Story by : Lillian de la Torre; Teleplay by : Robert C. Dennis	Joan Lorring as Emma Borden, Carmen Mathews as Lizzie Borden, Polly Rowles as Nell Cutts	January 22, 1956
One year after Lizzie Borden was acquitted for the murder of her parents, Emma Borden and family maid Margaret talk about Lizzie's mental state and their desire to leave the house. Ambitious Sacramento reporter Nell Cutts barges into the Borden home and pesters Emma with questions, even recreating the events of the murder. Lizzie comes downstairs and throws her out. When Emma sees Lizzie remove an axe hidden behind the fireplace, Lizzie admits she knows Emma killed their father and stepmother, and feigned ignorance in order to protect her. Emma suddenly suffers a delusion that the parents are upstairs and feels an imminent need to kill them again. When Lizzie tries to stop her, she threatens Lizzie with the axe. Cutts returns and, seeing the axe, demands a statement. Emma leaves, heading to the train station. To force the reporter out, Lizzie falsely confesses and threatens Nell with the axe. Supporting cast: Pat Hitchcock as Margaret, Kay Stewart as Grace, Wendy Winkleman as Child, Orangey as Cat (uncredited)
18	18	"Shopping for Death"	Robert Stevens	Ray Bradbury	Jo Van Fleet as Mrs. Shrike	January 29, 1956
Clarence Fox and Elmer Shore are retired insurance agents who travel to see various accidents and determine the causes by interviewing witnesses. They hope to use their years of experience to save people that they believe will die soon, especially potential murders occurring when the temperature hits 92 degrees Fahrenheit. Clarence has his sights on Mrs. Shrike, a boorish forty-five-year-old alcoholic whom he believes has a death wish, who yells at her nosy neighbors, and who rudely orders around children and her agitated butcher. She irritates everyone with whom she comes into contact. They advise her to change her life and fix her house, but this just causes her to laugh at them and lash out, leading Clarence to almost strike her with his cane and admit to Elmer that his pride caused him to fail to see her as a doomed lost soul. As the pair leave, they see Mrs. Shrike's husband Albert return home with a meat hook, and she is killed soon afterward. Supporting cast: Robert Harris as Clarence Fox, John Qualen as Elmer Shore, Mike Ross as Albert Shrike, Michael Ansara as Butcher, Charlott Knight as Woman in front of apartment building, Leola Wendorff as Woman in front of apartment building, Alfred Linder, Lee Erickson, Jack Tesler, Ralph Montgomery, Bob Morgan
19	19	"The Derelicts"	Robert Stevens	Story by : Terence Maples; Teleplay by : Robert C. Dennis	Robert Newton as Peter J. Goodfellow	February 5, 1956
Husband and wife Ralph and Herta Cowell (Reed, Knudsen) argue over the price of an expensive black mink stole. Businessman Ralph receives a call from his partner, millionaire Alfred Sloane, who wants to meet and discuss repayment of an IOU for $10,000 (and half the profits) for funding his invention. While meeting in a park that night, Ralph claims he doesn't have the money, and when Sloane threatens to involve lawyers, Ralph strangles his silent partner to avoid paying what he owes. The murder is witnessed by vagrant Peter J. Goodfellow, who picks up Sloane's cigarette case with the IOU inside, and he uses it to blackmail Ralph. Goodfellow and his fellow vagrant friend Fenton Shanks move into the Cowell home, much to the disgust of Herta. After months of Goodfellow and Fenton living with them and pawning almost everything in the Cowell home, as well as draining Ralph's bank account, Ralph confesses to Herta when she threatens to leave. After searching every night throughout the home, Ralph is eventually able to find the IOU and burn it. Goodfellow and Fenton leave, but soon afterward Police Detective Sergeant James Monroney arrives with a pawn ticket signed by Fenton for Sloane's cigarette case in Ralph's name, thusly tying Ralph to the murder of Sloane. Supporting cast: Peggy Knudsen as Herta Cowell, Cyril Delevanti as Alfred J. Sloane, Philip Reed as Ralph Cowell, Johnny Silver as Fenton Shanks, Robert Foulk as Police Detective Sergeant James Monroney
20	20	"And So Died Riabouchinska"	Robert Stevenson	Story by : Ray Bradbury; Teleplay by : Mel Dinelli	Claude Rains as John Fabian, Charles Bronson as Detective Krovitch	February 12, 1956
Macey and Dan Silver make a bet while backstage in a theatre when an errant coin toss leads to the discovery of the dead body of juggler Luke Ockham. Detective Krovitch investigates the murder by questioning John Fabian and his wife Alice. His suspicions fall on John Fabian, a ventriloquist with a fixation on his female dummy, Riabouchinska. Riabouchinska, seemingly acting independent of Fabian's control, insists on telling Krovitch the truth about Alice and lover Mel Douglas, which angers Alice, as she despises Riabouchinska. A stagehand gives Krovitch some background information during Fabian's show, and Krovitch finds a picture of the real Riabouchinska, a woman named Ilyana who mysteriously disappeared while serving as an assistant to Fabian. Fabian admits to having a tempestuous relationship with her before her disappearance, and it is she who served as the model for the dummy. Fabian then lovingly describes how he ditched his male dummy, Sweet William, and Riabouchinska was brought to life before declaring her love for him. Krovitch interviews booking agent Zander about Ockham's whereabouts, and Zander reveals information about a press book that shows that Fabian and Ockham worked together in Chicago. When Krovitch confronts Fabian, Riabouchinska tells Krovitch that Fabian killed Ockham because Ockham threatened to expose Fabian and Riabouchinska's love affair to the world unless he received $1000. Fabian confesses and Riabouchinska declares she can no longer love Fabian, as he refuses to truly listen to her. She stops moving and the devastated Fabian is arrested by Krovitch while proclaiming that he can no longer find her. Supporting cast: Claire Carleton as Alice Fabian, Lowell Gilmore as Mel Douglas, Charlie Cantor as Zander, Iris Adrian as Macey, Harry Tyler as Dan Silver, Bill Haade as Stagehand, Virginia Gregg as the voice of Riabouchinska
21	21	"Safe Conduct"	Justus Addiss	Andrew Solt	Claire Trevor as Mary Prescott, Jacques Bergerac as Jan Gubak	February 19, 1956
American journalist Mary Prescott is traveling on a train out of the Iron Curtain when her passport and documents are reviewed by the train conductor and an officer. She is befriended by local celebrity Jan Gubak, the captain of the national soccer team. Jan describes his on-field successes with the help of the conductor and an enthusiastic waiter when Mary is suddenly approached by Professor Klopka, who states that his country has a secret serum to offer society. While talking privately, Mary agrees to carry a luxury watch for Gubak, but during the customs inspection Jan turns her in to Customs Officer Trevitch for smuggling luxury items. Mary is arrested, and Professor Klopka, who is actually Captain Kriza, attempts to interrogate her for evidence. However, she is released soon afterward when the watch is discovered to be fake and Kriza believes the entire event to be an attempt to raise outrage internationally. Mary is soon visited by Jan on the train to Munich, and she learns that he is part of the underground resistance. The charade was to create a distraction that enabled Gubak to smuggle sensitive microfilm out of the country containing information written by an imprisoned and tortured bishop. Gubak gives Mary the microfilm and urges her to write the truth about his country. Supporting cast: Werner Klemperer as Professor Klopka / Captain Kriza, John Banner as Train Conductor, Peter Van Eyck as Officer, Konstantin Shayne as Customs Officer Trevitch, Ralph Manza as Waiter, Charlie Hall as Man with Pool Cue (uncredited)
22	22	"Place of Shadows"	Robert Stevens	Robert C. Dennis	Everett Sloane as Father Vincente	February 26, 1956
Floyd Unser gets travel information from the ticket agent about a vehicle coming to pick him up. He is met by Brother Gerard, who takes him to a local monastery where he meets with Father Vincente about seeing a man named Dave Rocco. Father Vincente reveals that he knows the man is actually Ray Clements, whom Rocco stole money from and cost him his job, his father, and his girl. Clements wants to get revenge on Rocco, who is taking sanctuary there. Father Vincente gives Clements all the money he is owed and both he and Brother Gerard advise Clements to choose forgiveness, and Clements is forced to leave when he declines. Clements almost shoots a man after following Brother Charles to a visitor's room, not realizing the man is someone else, but he is stopped by Father Vincente. Clements kills Rocco's partner, the actual Floyd Unser, in self-defense at the train station and takes sanctuary at the same monastery, as he was shot by Unser. Police officers visit the monastery and ask Father Vincente questions about Clements' location. Clements tells Father Vincente that he no longer wants revenge, but Rocco died just before Clements' arrival at the monastery. Supporting cast: Mark Damon as Ray Clements, Joe Downing (credited as Joseph Downing) as Floyd Unser, Sean McClory as Brother Gerard, Everett Glass as Brother Charles, Steve Mitchell as Joey the Cop, Claude Akins as Cop, Harry Tyler as Train Ticket Agent
23	23	"Back for Christmas"	Alfred Hitchcock	Story by : John Collier; Teleplay by : Francis Cockrell	John Williams as Herbert Carpenter	March 4, 1956
Englishman Herbert Carpenter is digging a hole in his basement under the guise of building a wine cellar. He and his loving but pesky wife Hermione are planning a long holiday in California, which he desires to be permanent. Their servant Elsie is preparing the house for their extended absence. They hold one last party with friends, such as Major and Mrs. Sinclair and Mr. and Mrs. Hewitt. They discuss jet flight, which the Carpenters fear, versus driving, their preferred mode of travel. On the day of their departure, and after doting good-byes from their friends, Herbert bludgeons his wife to death, as planned, and buries her body in the basement. He is almost caught in the act by a surprise visit from friends, but he hides until they leave. He then goes off alone on his road trip to Northridge, California and a new job there, where he gloats in his freedom from marriage and forges a letter from Hermione to their friends. After arriving at his new swanky "digs", Herbert receives the mail from his new employer Mr. Hall while waiting for his new maid. Among the letters to his wife from their friends back home is a bill from a contractor for work that Hermione had secretly arranged for, excavating the wine cellar as a present for Herbert, meaning that his crime will soon be discovered. Supporting cast: Isabel Elsom as Hermione Carpenter, Arthur Gould-Porter (credited as A.E. Gould-Porter) as Major Sinclair, Lily Kemble-Cooper as Mrs. Sinclair, Gavin Muir as Mr. Wallingford, Katherine Warren as Mrs. Freda Wallingford, Gerald Hamer as Mr. Hewitt, Irene Tedrow as Mrs. Hewitt, Mollie Glessing as Elsie the Servant, Ross Ford as Mr. Hall, Theresa Harris as the California Maid
24	24	"The Perfect Murder"	Robert Stevens	Story by : Stacey Aumonier; Teleplay by : Victor Wolfson	Hurd Hatfield as Paul Tallendier, Mildred Natwick as Aunt Rosalie Tallendier	March 11, 1956
France. Henri and Paul Tallendier and plot to kill their Aunt Rosalie to inherit her fortune after a lawyer reveals the contents of a deceased uncle's estate. Henri is a hardworking father of four while Paul is a dissolute hedonist. Rosalie pledges to leave her wealth to the local convent, aware that Paul and Henri want her gone, and Paul feigns fainting from anemia, with servant Ernestine instructed to care for him. Paul begins to live with Aunt Rosalie and her fast-talking parrot, who dislikes him but appreciates his capacity to play dominoes, and Ernestine is overjoyed with Paul's presence. Dr. Poncet happily tells Aunt Rosalie that she has the pulse of a 20-year-old, to the disgust of Paul. Henri begins breaking in to steal items for pawning and is confronted by Paul. After discussing their situations, Paul has Henri grind glass into fine powder while his wife Marie is away, while Paul himself gets drunk rejoicing. Paul adds it to the egg mixture that is supposed to make a soufflé for Rosalie's dinner, but that night Rosalie drunkenly insists on eating fish, and the next morning Paul dies when he eats an omelette made out of the lethal egg mixture. Aunt Rosalie tells Henri that as her sole remaining family member he will be her heir. Supporting cast: Philip Coolidge as Henri Tallendier, Hope Summers as Marie Tallendier, Walter Kingsford as Dr. Poncet, Gladys Hurlbut as Ernestine, Percy Helton as Lawyer, Jack Chefe as Waiter
25	25	"There Was an Old Woman"	Robert Stevenson	Story by : Jerry Hackady & Harold Hackady; Teleplay by : Marian Cockrell	Estelle Winwood as Monica Laughton	March 18, 1956
Couple Frank and Lorna Bramwell, desperate for money, go to the mansion of eccentric Monica Laughton to rob her when they learn from locals that Laughton is all alone after her relative Oscar died. They present themselves as relatives and are warmly welcomed by Laughton, who introduces them to ghost relatives that she believes are present for the funeral. Their robbery plan goes awry because Laughton proves wholly crazy and completely unresponsive to their threats. She only shows fear when they threaten her imaginary guests. The Bramwells become tired and frustrated, because they cannot find any money and there seems to be no food in the house. In desperation, they eat a batch of freshly made muffins, not knowing that they are filled with rat poison. Laughton's fortune turns out to be inside a handbag that she carries everywhere with her, which is revealed when she pays Theodore the milkman with a $1,000 bill. Supporting cast: Charles Bronson as Frank Bramwell, Norma Crane as Lorna Bramwell, Dabbs Greer as Theodore the Milkman, Emerson Treacy as Arthur the Deli Manager
26	26	"Whodunit"	Francis Cockrell	Story by : C. B. Gilford; Teleplay by : Francis Cockrell & Marian Cockrell	John Williams as Alexander Penn Arlington	March 25, 1956
Mystery writer Alexander Penn Arlington is distraught when he arrives in Heaven not knowing who killed him with a letter opener. The author of 75 novels, he demands to know the answer. His recording angel, Wilfred, returns Alexander to Earth to repeat his last day to investigate, and he is awakened by his butler, Horace. Alexander's fired assistant Talbot, money-owing nephew Vincent, openly unfaithful wife Carol, and his wife's lover Wally Benson all have motives. In his study, he tells them all that one of them is planning his death for midnight and asks them all questions. Benson turns off the light and Alexander is killed in the dark without seeing who did it. Returning to Heaven, Wilfred points out that the killer must have trusted the person who turned off the light, so Alexander deduces that it must have been Carol. Supporting cast: Amanda Blake as Carol Arlington, Jerry Paris as Wally Benson, Philip Coolidge as Talbot, Alan Napier as Wilfred – The Recording Angel, Bill Slack as Vincent, Ruta Lee as Angel, and Rudy Robles as Horace the Butler.
27	27	"Help Wanted"	James Neilson	Teleplay by : Robert C. Dennis; Based upon the Mary Orr and Reginald Denham adaptation of a story by : Stanley Ellin	John Qualen as Mr. Crabtree, Lorne Greene as Mr. X	April 1, 1956
Elderly Mr. Crabtree worries about his wife Laura, who desperately needs an operation. Despite having attacked his former employer when being fired for being too old, he receives a visit from Miss Brown confirming his new employment filing reports regarding corporate notices for a generous $100 per week salary. He is ordered by his new boss, the emotionless Mr. X, to kill a man who will enter his office the next day in exchange for keeping his job and one year's worth of salary to cover the operation. Mr. X admits to burning all of Crabtree's reports so there will be no record of their communications. The target is Mr. X's wife's first husband, who is blackmailing Mr. X to keep his wife's secret of being a bigamist. Crabtree is to hand the man an envelope, secretly containing a suicide note instead of money, and then push the man out the window. Crabtree decides at the last moment not to do the task, but when a man enters his office at the expected time, Crabtree is so upset at the thought of losing his wife and job that he ends up killing him by accident, and Mr. X immediately calls him to report mailing him his salary, as he witnessed the act. Police officers question Crabtree briefly but leave without suspicion, believing the dead man to have jumped from the roof. Shortly afterward the correct target arrives at Crabtree's office, but Crabtree has already received his payment for the murder and simply walks out. Supporting cast: Madge Kennedy as Mrs. Laura Crabtree, Parley Baer as Police Detective Gryar, Ruth Swanson as Miss Brown, John Harmon as Donations Collector, Malcolm Atterbury as the Blackmailer, Paul Brinegar as Police Officer
28	28	"Portrait of Jocelyn"	Robert Stevens	Story by : Edgar Marvin; Teleplay by : Harold Swanton	Philip Abbott as Mark Halliday, Nancy Gates as Debbie Halliday, John Baragrey as Arthur Clymer / Detective Arbison	April 8, 1956
Mark and Debbie's first wedding anniversary is ruined when a portrait they commissioned is revealed to be of Mark's first wife, Jocelyn, who has been missing for five years. The art dealer tells them to talk to Jeff Harrison, Mark's former brother-in-law, if they have an issue. Jeff tells Mark that he received a letter from Jocelyn from Switzerland two years prior, after she supposedly disappeared. Debbie believes that Mark stills loves Jocelyn and urges him to find the truth. With the help of Jeff and a real estate agent who rents Mark his former cottage home, Mark tracks down the painter, Arthur Clymer, who claims to have been married to Jocelyn and killed her in a jealous rage. Mark attacks Clymer because Clymer described how Mark killed Jocelyn five years ago at the same cottage in which Mark is staying. Clymer is actually a police detective named Arbison and worked together with Jeff to get a confession out of Mark. Supporting cast: Raymond Bailey as Jeff Harrison, Olan Soule as Art Dealer, Harry Tyler as Real Estate Agent
29	29	"The Orderly World of Mr. Appleby"	James Neilson	Story by : Stanley Ellin; Teleplay by : Victor Wolfson & Robert C. Dennis	Robert H. Harris as Laurence Appleby, Meg Mundy as Martha Sturgis-Appleby	April 15, 1956
Antiques dealer Laurence Appleby is desperate for money as he is being threatened with a lawsuit by a Turkish national, Mr. Desar, over a $12,000 debt. He becomes utterly distraught when wealthy Martha Sturgis breaks an $1,000 camel statuette, although he is somewhat relieved when she writes him a check for the full balance. Appleby kills his argumentative wife Lena by causing her to fall and hit her head in order to get her inheritance. Since he still has debts, he woos and marries wealthy heiress Sturgis. When Martha refuses to give him money for another $7000 in debt to Desar over Hittite curios, he tries to kill her while servant Ella is away, but Martha is prepared for him. Martha and her lawyer Sidney Gainsborough have evidence that Appleby killed his first wife. If anything happens to Martha, Gainsborough will go to the police. Appleby is about to comply with Martha's demands to give up his shop and stay at home with her, but she accidentally falls and dies the same way as Lena. Supporting cast: Gage Clarke (credited as Gage Clark) as Sidney Gainsborough, Louise Larabee as Lena Appleby, Michael Ansara as Mr. Desar, Mollie Glessing as Ella, Edna Holland as Mrs. Murchie, Helen Spring as Mrs. Grant Note: Edna Holland and Helen Spring are credited but do not appear in the episode; this suggests deleted scenes feature the pair.
30	30	"Never Again"	Robert Stevens	Story by : Adela Rogers St. Johns; Teleplay by : Gwen Bagni, Irwin Gielgud and Stirling Silliphant	Phyllis Thaxter as Karen Stewart, Louise Allbritton (credited as Louise Albritton) as Renee Marlow, Warren Stevens as Jeff Simmons	April 22, 1956
Karen Stewart, a recovering alcoholic, wakes up hung over and with no memory of the night before. She slowly recalls speaking with friend Margaret before attending a party with her fiancé, Jeff Simmons. Karen, jealous and insecure, started drinking again with a Mr. Marlow when she concludes (from drunken rambling via Marlow) that Jeff's business associate (and Marlow's sister) Renee is trying to seduce Jeff, even though Renee and the bartender try to serve her ginger ale. Others, such as Mr. Sterling, constantly try to hand her alcohol, not knowing her addiction. Her last memory is of breaking a glass in her hand and Jeff trying to help her. Karen then learns from the nurse that she is in jail for killing Jeff with that broken glass. Supporting cast: Jack Mullaney as Mr. Marlow, Joan Banks as Margaret, Mason Curry as Mr. Sterling, Jack Ramstead as Bob the Bartender, Jack Mulhall as Party Guest, Karine Nordman as Tipsy Woman, Carol Veazie as Nurse, Marion Gray as Party Guest, Franklyn Farnum as Party Guest (uncredited), Jack Deery as Bar Patron (uncredited), Herschel Graham as Party Guest (uncredited), Don Ames as Party Guest (uncredited)
31	31	"The Gentleman from America"	Robert Stevens	Story by : Michael Arlen; Teleplay by : Francis Cockrell	Biff McGuire as Howard Latimer	April 29, 1956
In London, May 1940, Sir Stephen Hurstwood and friend Derek discuss their betting engagements while American oilman Howard Latimer celebrates a big victory. Hurstwood offers a bet of 1,000 British pounds if Latimer can stay the entire night in the supposedly haunted Cromwell room of the Hurstwood mansion. Latimer is given a gun, one candle, one match, and a book that describes the mysterious beheading of Julia Hurstwood in the room. He takes one practice shot to confirm that the pistol is loaded. He reads about and envisions Julia and Geraldine Hurstwood, the individuals serving as the basis of the ghost story. That night Latimer sees a ghostly headless figure, fires the weapon numerous times, and collapses in fright. In October 1945, Latimer suddenly shows up at the Hurstwood mansion and is met by the butler Hanson before meeting Hurstwood and Derek, who admit to putting blanks in the gun and state that the ghost is a trick set up by Hurstwood for money, which causes Latimer to attack Hurstwood. Three sanitarium officials arrive to subdue Latimer, and Calendar tells Hurstwood and Derek of Latimer's insanity and the need to solve the murder of Julia. Supporting cast: Ralph Clanton as Sir Stephen Hurstwood, Eric Snowden (credited as Eric Snowdon) as Hanson, John Dodsworth as Calender, John Irving as Derek, Sonia Torgeson as Geraldine, Jan Chaney as Julia, John Alderson as Attendant, Geoffrey Steele as Man, Sam Harris as Club Patron (uncredited), Herschel Graham as Club Patron (uncredited)
32	32	"The Baby Sitter"	Robert Stevens	Story by : Emily Neff; Teleplay by : Sarett Rudley	Thelma Ritter as Lottie Slocum	May 6, 1956
Lottie Slocum is the last person to have seen Clara Nash before she was strangled to death, so she is interviewed by a police detective sergeant and is supported by her daughter Janie. As the detective sergeant leaves, nosy Blanche Armsteader arrives to gossip. Lottie, who used to be the Nashes' babysitter, believes that Clara had it coming because she treated her husband Mr. Nash badly, and she notes her distrust of Clara's boyfriend Mr. DeMario. Lottie flashes back to the last fight between the husband and wife, one in which Lottie actually intervened by arguing with an angry Clara. After Janie leaves, Lottie is visited by DeMario, who warns her not to make things up about him to the police. The detective stops by to confirm Lottie's story about DeMario, as he has no alibi, and Lottie tearfully states that he left at 1:45. Lottie has feelings for Mr. Nash and hopes to please him by keeping his secret from the police — that he was at home the night that Clara died — so she writes him a note outlining what she knows about that night. He stops by while she is writing the note, supposedly to talk, but he burns the note and kills her instead. Supporting cast: Mary Wickes as Blanche Armsteader, Carole Mathews as Clara Nash, Rebecca Welles (credited as Reba Tassell) as Janie Slocum, Theodore Newton as Mr. Nash, Michael Ansara as Mr. DeMario, Ray Teal as a Police Detective Sergeant
33	33	"The Belfry"	Herschel Daugherty	Story by : Allan Vaughan Elston; Teleplay by : Robert C. Dennis	Jack Mullaney as Clint Ringle, Pat Hitchcock as Ellie Marsh	May 13, 1956
Clint Ringle wants to marry schoolteacher Ellie Marsh, but when she refuses him, he kills her fiancé Walt Norton with an axe and flees, as the act was seen by student Albert Grinstead. Clint is hunted by the townsfolk, so he hides in the belfry of Ellie's school, planning to kill her when he gets the chance, and he leaves a threatening note for her on the school chalkboard. The next day, Ellie blames students Albert and Luke, but a schoolgirl says that it was there when the children arrived. Clint stays in the belfry for a few days and feels smug when everyone assumes that he is long gone, although he is almost caught by Albert retrieving a ball. When Ellie's fiancé is buried after the local preacher conducts his funeral, local man Elmer rings the bell, causing Clint to shout in surprise and reveal his whereabouts. Supporting cast: John Compton as Walt Norton, Norman Leavitt as Elmer, David Saber as Albert Grinstead, Rudy Lee as Luke, Dabbs Greer as the Sheriff, Jim Hayward as Preacher, Ralph Moody as Local Citizen, Horst Ehrhardt as Local Citizen, Kathleen Hartnagel as Schoolgirl
34	34	"The Hidden Thing"	Robert Stevens	Story by : A. J. Russell; Teleplay by : James Cavanagh	Biff McGuire as Dana Edwards, Robert H. Harris as John Hurley	May 20, 1956
Dana Edwards's fiancée Laura is killed in a hit-and-run in front of Dana, and he is unable to remember any details of the car involved for Police Inspector Shea. His mother consoles him as best she can, helping him try to recover. John Hurley, a former teacher who lost his son in a similar way, claims to know how to give Dana total recall. After many sessions, Dana remembers the license plate of the car and tells Shea. He is then surprised to learn from Shea that John Hurley is crazy and not a memory expert at all, nor did he ever have a son. Supporting cast: Rachel Ames (credited as Judith Ames) as Laura, Theodore Newton as Inspector Shea, Katherine Warren as Mother Edwards, Richard Collier as The Counterman
35	35	"The Legacy"	James Neilson	Story by : Gina Kaus; Teleplay by : Gina Kaus & Andrew Solt	Leora Dana as Irene Cole, Jacques Bergerac as Prince Burhan	May 27, 1956
English author Randolph Burnside runs into wealthy Cecilia Smithson, Colonel Blair, and Irene Cole upon returning to his former home, where he is welcomed by the cafe host. Donna Dew begs Burnside to write a script for her. Wealthy but plain housewife Irene, wife of oil millionaire Howard Cole and herself a bottlecap heiress, is pursued by playboy Prince Burhan, who ignores other beauties for her and threatens to kill himself if he cannot have Irene. However, she refuses to leave her neglectful husband for him and consistently seeks advise and consoling from Burnside, who is writing a book about Burhan. When Burhan dies in a car accident racing down a road, Irene and her husband assume that he killed himself over his love for Irene. Sometime later, Burnside learns from the cafe host that Burhan's death was an accident, as his mechanic had disconnected his brakes, and that he had pursued Irene for her money, as he was bankrupt from gambling. Burnside decides to keep this a secret when he sees that Irene, believing a man killed himself over his love for her, has a newfound confidence that has greatly improved her marriage and her spark for life. Supporting cast: Enid Markey as Cecilia Smithson, Alan Hewitt as Howard Cole, Walter Kingsford as Colonel Blair, Ralph Clanton as Randolph Burnside, Roxanne Arlen as Donna Dew, Rudolph Anders as Cafe Host, Joan Dixon as Jealous Girl, Bess Flowers as Club Patron (uncredited), Florence Wix as Club Patron (uncredited), Charles Cirillo as Porter (uncredited), Sam Harris as Club Patron (uncredited), Herschel Graham as Club Patron (uncredited), Don Ames as Club Patron (uncredited), Harry Denny as Club Patron (uncredited), Joe Gilbert as Club Patron (uncredited), Robert Locke Lorraine as Club Patron (uncredited), Paul Power as Club Patron (uncredited)
36	36	"Mink"	Robert Stevenson	Irwin Gielgud & Gwen Bagni	Ruth Hussey as Paula Hudson	June 3, 1956
Mild-mannered Paula Hudson, supported by her friend Lois, seeks to have a mink stole coat valued by fur shop owner Leslie Ronalds. She is apprehended by a policewoman, Sergeant Bradford, for possessing stolen property. Paula attempts to prove that she bought it for $400 cash the previous Monday, but the people she bought it from deny having sold it to her. The seller, Dolores Dawn (Paul), denies having met her, and her hairdresser Lucille (Borg) denies having given any information regarding the coat, although Lucille calls Dolores just after the police leave to discuss the matter. Paula is eventually approached by the man, Charlie Harper (McCallion), who stole the coat, and he offers to buy it back from her for $600, as he admits to facing 10 years in prison if caught. When she declines, he steals it back in order to end the police investigation, but is arrested. Supporting cast: Eugenia Paul as Dolores Dawn, Anthony Eustrel as Leslie Ronalds, Vinton Hayworth as Sergeant Delaney, Vivi Janiss as Sergeant Bradford, Sheila Bromley as Lois, Veda Ann Borg as Lucille, Mary Jackson as Mrs. J. Wilson, James McCallion as Charlie Harper, Paul E. Burns as Furrier Assistant
37	37	"Decoy"	Arnold Laven	Story by : Richard George Pedicini; Teleplay by : Bernard C. Schoenfeld	Robert Horton as Gil Larkin, Cara Williams as Mona Cameron	June 10, 1956
Piano player Gil Larkin becomes upset when he learns that the woman he loves, singer Mona Cameron, is being abused by her husband Ben, an agent. Gil confronts Ben in his office, but someone named Ritchie knocks Gil unconscious and shoots Ben, placing the gun in Gil's hand and listening to the scene over the phone. Gil remembers the name Ritchie being said by Ben and realizes his predicament as a patsy, or decoy. After investigating a note on Ben's desk, Gil goes to see Mona, hiding himself from the theater doorman, when he runs into Mr. and Mrs. Sasikawa, who report not having spoken with Ben over the phone. Gil speaks with disc jockey Dave Packard about Ben's death, but Dave is clueless. Gil is apprehended by Lieutenant Brandt, as he admits that his fingerprints are on the gun. After he is released, he goes to see Mona and realizes, when he hears the record that was playing over the phone during the murder, that she set him up so she could be with her lover, Ritchie, who emerges with a gun. However, the police bust in and arrest both Mona and Ritchie, while Gil takes his musical arrangements. Supporting cast: Jack Mullaney as Dave Packard, Philip Coolidge as Lieutenant Brandt, Harry Lewis as Ritchie, David Orrick McDearmon (credited as David Orrick) as Ben Cameron, Mary Jean Yamaji as Mrs. Sasikawa, Edo Mita as Mr. Sasikawa, Frank Gorshin as Studio Page, Harry Tyler as Theater Doorman, Wallace Earl Laven (credited as Eileen Harley) as Secretary
38	38	"The Creeper"	Herschel Daugherty	Story by : Joseph Ruscoll; Teleplay by : James Cavanagh	Constance Ford as Ellen Grant, Steve Brodie as Steve Grant, Harry Townes as Ed	June 17, 1956
Martha Stone and George the janitor discuss the extreme heat and a murderer killing local women. The murderer has killed two blonde women while they are alone at night. Ellen Grant is terrified and wants extra locks on the apartment door, but her husband Steve is dismissive of her concerns as he is angry that he did not get a pay raise at work. Ellen wants Steve to request to work the day shift until the murderer is caught. Steve goes to have a beer before work and runs into friend Ed, who stops by the Grant's apartment and offers to stay with old acquaintance Ellen. The two discuss why Ellen turned down Ed romantically and Ed's continuing grudge regarding Ellen. While Steve is at work, Ellen is scared and suspicious of various people that she meets, such as the local shoemaker and even George, but she turns down Martha's offer to stay with her that night. Martha accuses Ellen of having an affair with Ed. She is only relieved when the locksmith arrives to fix a lock and chain on her door, but the locksmith turns out to be the murderer, and he strangles Ellen as a terrified Steve listens to the commotion over the phone. Supporting cast: Reta Shaw as Martha Stone, Percy Helton as George the Janitor, Alfred Linder as Shoemaker
39	39	"Momentum"	Robert Stevens	Story by : Cornell Woolrich; Teleplay by : Francis Cockrell	Skip Homeier as Richard Paine, Joanne Woodward as Beth Paine	June 24, 1956
Richard Paine hates the rat race of life. He and his wife Beth are about to be kicked out of their home, and both are angry that he worked on half pay to help his job and his boss, A.T. Burroughs has yet to repay him the $450 owed. Richard tries to borrow the money from bartender Charlie while having a drink, but Charlie lost his money at the racetrack. Richard goes to Burroughs' home and steals the money that Burroughs owes him, but he accidentally kills him when Burroughs interrupts him and a struggle ensues. Richard tells Beth that he got the money from Charlie. The janitor Martin arrives to show the apartment to a prospective renter. Richard becomes paranoid that he is being watched and sought after by the police, and he follows an innocent man seeking his wife at a bus stop. He then overreacts and is shot when a finance company agent comes to collect his debt. He flees just as the police arrive. Beth becomes paranoid herself, believing a man reading a newspaper is monitoring her. He takes a cab ride to meet Beth at the bus station, and the cab driver shows concern and offers to get him help, though a radio announcer giving a news flash about Richard's doings brings fear to the cabbie. Richard forces the cabbie to pull over, and he knocks him out after a passing motorist stops to offer help. While injured and possibly dying, Richard discovers that Beth met Burroughs the night before and received the owed money, commenting about the rat race before passing out. Supporting cast: Ken Christy as A.T. Burroughs, William Newell (credited as Billy Newell) as Charlie, Frank Kreig (credited as Frank Krieg) as Martin the Janitor, Henry Hunter as Finance Company Agent, Don Dillaway as Policeman, Mike Ragan as Cab Driver, Harry Tyler as Apartment Hunter, Jack Tesler as Newspaper Man, Joe Gilbert (credited as Joseph Gilbert) as Passing Motorist, Dorothy Crehan as Woman, Patricia Knox as Woman at Bus Stop, John Lehman (credited as John Lehmann) as Man at Bus Stop, Myron Cook as Man in Bar, Paul Frees as Radio Announcer (uncredited)
