= Alfred Shelly =

American film and television actor

- Shelly in Mannix, 1967
- Born: Alfred Irwin Shapiro; June 6, 1929; Brooklyn, New York, U.S.
- Died: April 12, 2013 (aged 83); Carmel, California, U.S.
- Occupations: Film and television actor

Alfred Irwin Shapiro (June 6, 1929 – April 12, 2013) was an American film and television actor.

== Life and career ==
Shelly was born in Brooklyn, New York. He attended high school in Venice, California. He served in the 7th Cavalry in Korea during the Korean War. He began his screen career in 1957, appearing in the film Under Fire. From 1958 to 1959, he appeared in the NBC crime television series Dragnet.

Later in his career, Shelly guest-starred in television programs including 77 Sunset Strip, The Man from U.N.C.L.E. (and its spin-off The Girl from U.N.C.L.E.), Lawman, Voyage to the Bottom of the Sea, Mannix, Dragnet 1967, F Troop, The Lawless Years and A Man Called Shenandoah, and played the recurring role of Ed Carney in the NBC crime drama television series The D.A.'s Man. He also appeared in films such as Once You Kiss a Stranger, The Threat, Brainstorm, Black Samson, The Miracle and Not with My Wife, You Don't!.

Shelly retired from acting in 1976, last appearing in the film The Gumball Rally, playing Harry.

== Death ==
Shelly died on April 12, 2013, in Carmel, California, at the age of 83.
