= Cheyenne (1947 film) =

1947 film by Raoul Walsh

- Theatrical release poster
- Directed by: Raoul Walsh
- Screenplay by: Alan Le May; Thames Williamson
- Story by: Paul Wellman
- Produced by: Robert Buckner
- Starring: Dennis Morgan; Jane Wyman; Janis Paige; Bruce Bennett
- Cinematography: Sidney Hickox
- Edited by: Christian Nyby
- Music by: Max Steiner
- Color process: Black and white
- Production company: Warner Bros. Pictures
- Distributed by: Warner Bros. Pictures
- Release date: June 6, 1947
- Running time: 99 minutes
- Country: United States
- Language: English
- Budget: $1,929,000
- Box office: $2,550,000 (US rentals) or $3,303,000

Cheyenne is a 1947 American western mystery film directed by Raoul Walsh and starring Dennis Morgan, Jane Wyman, Janis Paige and Bruce Bennett. It was produced and released by Hollywood major Warner Bros. Pictures.

== Plot ==
Jim Wylie is a gambler in Laramie, Wyoming Territory who is wanted by the Nevada law. He gets a proposal from a Wells Fargo agent; if he can help locate a bandit known as "The Poet" who has been robbing stagecoaches, all pending charges will be dropped and Jim can even claim a cash reward.

His stage to Cheyenne has a pair of female passengers, Ann Kincaid and saloon singer Emily Carson, when their coach is ambushed by the Sundance Kid and his gang. But when he opens the strongbox, Sundance is furious to find nothing but a mocking poem from The Poet.

Jim pretends to be The Poet to infiltrate his gang. What he doesn't know is that Ann is married to the notorious outlaw. She goes along with the ruse to see where it leads. Her husband, the real Poet, is Ed Landers, a trusted Wells Fargo employee, who promises to pull one last job and then get away with Ann safely to San Francisco.

Sundance is once again foiled on a job by the Poet getting there first, and two of Sundance's men are killed. He realizes that Ann has double-crossed him. Jim confides to Landers his true identity, not realizing Landers is the man he's after. Landers promptly tells Cheyenne's sheriff that Jim is not just pretending to be the Poet, but is him.

Ann detects a whiff of perfume on Landers that she recognizes. It's Emily's "Lily of the Valley", proof to Ann that her lying, thieving husband plans to take Emily away to San Francisco instead of her. On his next holdup attempt, Landers is shot dead by Jim.

All is well until Jim is told that unless he can also recover The Poet's stolen money, there will be no reward. He is dejected until Ann, leaving town on the stage, tosses him two sacks filled with money. A delighted Jim gallops off to catch up with her.

== Cast ==
- Dennis Morgan as James Wylie
- Jane Wyman as Ann Kincaid
- Janis Paige as Emily Carson
- Bruce Bennett as Ed Landers
- Alan Hale Sr. as Fred Durkin
- Arthur Kennedy as The Sundance Kid
- John Ridgely as Challkeye
- Barton MacLane as Webb Yancey
- Tom Tyler as Pecos
- Bob Steele as Bucky
- John Compton as Limpy Bill
- John Alvin as Single Jack
- Monte Blue as Timberline
- Anne O'Neal as Miss Kittredge (as Ann O'Neal)
- Tom Fadden as Charlie
- Britt Wood as Swamper

== Box office ==
According to Warner Bros records, the film earned $2,506,000 domestically and $797,000 foreign.

== Anecdotes ==
The film centers around the mysterious "poet" bandit, who robs Wells Fargo stagecoaches. The inspiration for this may have come from a notorious outlaw of similar methodology, Black Bart.

== See also ==
- List of American films of 1947
