= Thunder Over Arizona =

1956 film by Joseph Kane

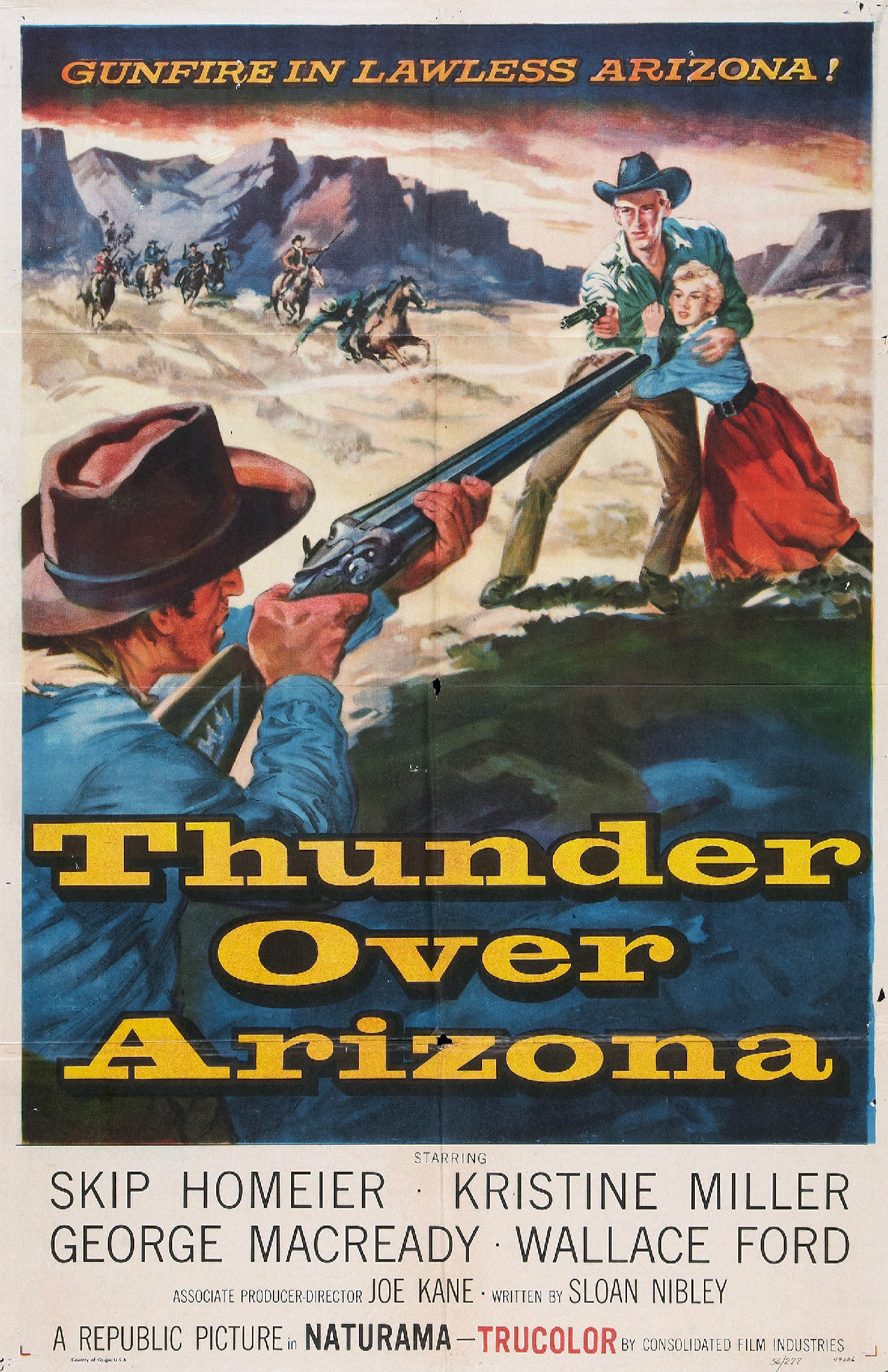
- Theatrical release poster
- Directed by: Joseph Kane
- Written by: Sloan Nibley
- Produced by: Joseph Kane
- Starring: Skip Homeier; Kristine Miller; George Macready; Wallace Ford; Nacho Galindo; Gregory Walcott
- Cinematography: Bud Thackery
- Edited by: Tony Martinelli
- Music by: R. Dale Butts
- Production company: Republic Pictures
- Distributed by: Republic Pictures
- Release date: August 4, 1956
- Running time: 70 minutes
- Country: United States
- Language: English

Thunder Over Arizona is a 1956 American Western film directed by Joseph Kane, written by Sloan Nibley, and starring Skip Homeier, Kristine Miller, George Macready, Wallace Ford, Nacho Galindo and Gregory Walcott. It was released on August 4, 1956, by Republic Pictures. The film was shot in Trucolor and Naturama.

== Plot ==
Colourful western about a crooked landowner.

== Cast ==
- Skip Homeier as Tim Mallory
- Kristine Miller as Fay Warren
- George Macready as Mayor Ervin Plummer
- Wallace Ford as Hal Stiles
- Nacho Galindo as Pancho Gutierrez
- Gregory Walcott as Mark Warren
- Jack Elam as Deputy Slats Callahan
- George Keymas as Harvard 'Shotgun' Kelly
- John Doucette as Deputy Rand
- John Compton as Tab Warren
- Robert Swan as Jud Warren
- Julian Rivero as Padre Ortega
- Francis McDonald as Pliny Warren
