= Herb Ellis (actor) =

American actor

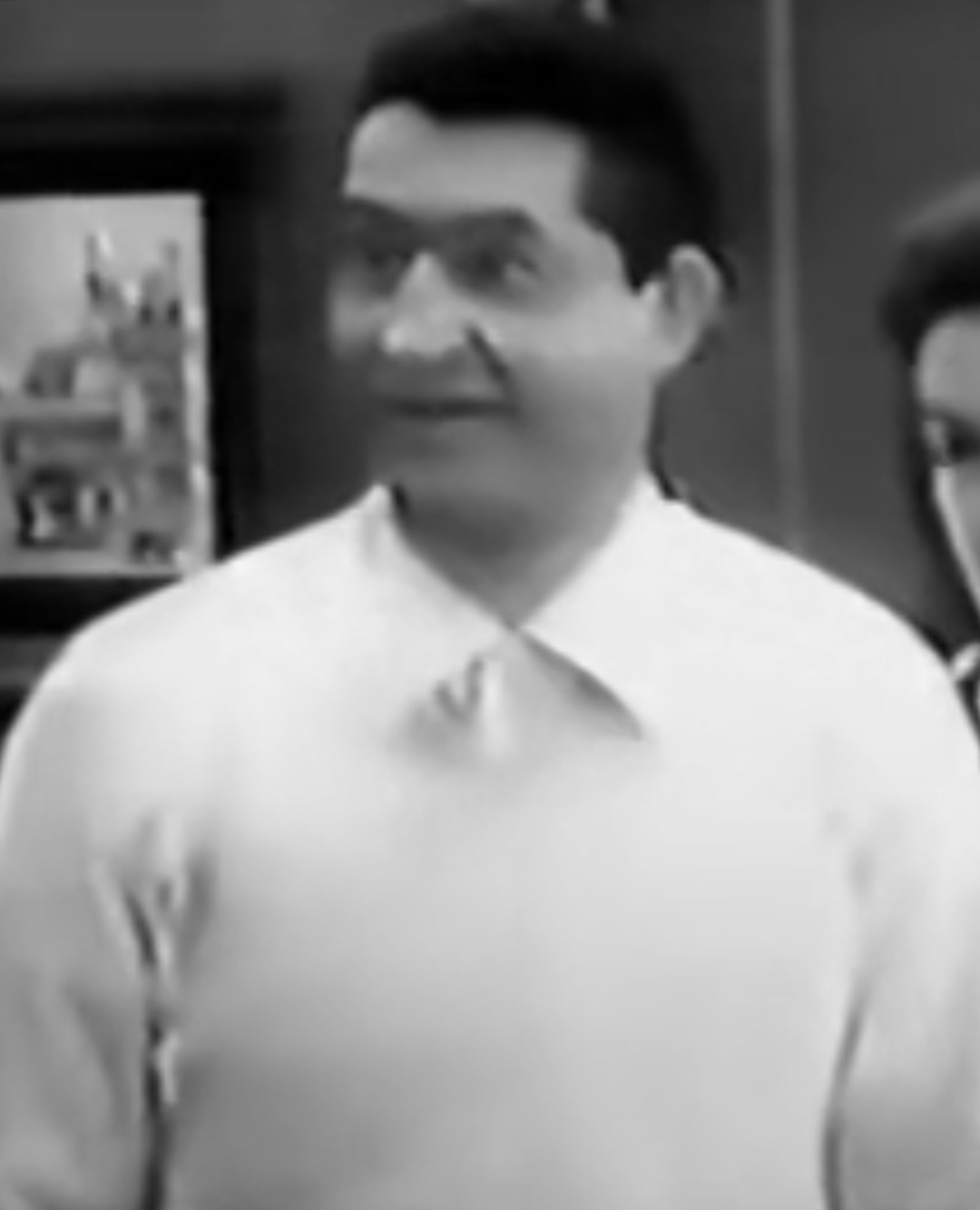
- Herb Ellis in I Married Joan (1954)
- Born: Herbert Siegel; January 17, 1921; Cleveland, Ohio, U.S.
- Died: December 26, 2018 (aged 97); San Gabriel, California, U.S.
- Occupation: Actor
- Spouse: Sylvia Siegel
- Children: 2

Herbert Ellis (born Herbert Siegel; January 17, 1921 – December 26, 2018) was an American character actor and writer. He was best known for his collaborations with Jack Webb, and he frequently portrayed law enforcement officers in film and television.

Born in Cleveland, Ohio, Ellis began his career in Hollywood in the late 1940s. Ellis and Webb together devised the name and concept for Dragnet after collaborating on an unsuccessful project titled Joe Friday, Room Five. He played Officer Frank Smith in eight episodes of the original Dragnet series. He played Frank La Valle in 23 episodes of The D.A.'s Man, and he played Beat bistro owner, painter and sculptor Wilbur in five episodes of Peter Gunn. Ellis and Webb later worked together on Dragnet 1966 and Dragnet 1967.

From 1959 to 1962, Ellis was cast as Dr. Dan Wagner in seven episodes of the CBS military sitcom/drama series, Hennesey, starring Jackie Cooper as a United States Navy physician, with Abby Dalton as nurse Martha Hale.

== Personal life and death ==
Ellis was married to Sylvia Siegel, and they had two children. He died on December 26, 2018, at his home in San Gabriel, California. He was 97.

== Filmography ==
Year	Title	Role	Notes
1953	A Blueprint for Murder	First Detective at Desk	Uncredited
1954	Dragnet	Booking Sergeant	Uncredited
1954	Rogue Cop	Bartender	Uncredited
1954	Naked Alibi	Communications Officer	Uncredited
1955	Pete Kelly's Blues	Bedido	
1956	The Killing	2nd American Airlines Clerk	
1957	Paths of Glory	Small Role	Uncredited
1958	Too Much, Too Soon	Assistant	Uncredited
1958	Colgate Theatre		Season 1 Episode 7: "Welcome to Washington"
1958-1961	Peter Gunn	Beat Bistro owner, painter and sculptor Wilbur, 5 Episodes	
1959	Alfred Hitchcock Presents	Detective Breslin	Season 4 Episode 18: "The Last Dark Step"
1960	Alfred Hitchcock Presents	Lieutenant Hogan	Season 5 Episode 19: "Not the Running Type"
1961	The Andy Griffith Show	Bobby Fleet	Season 1, Episode 31
1964	My Favorite Martian	News Reporter	
1965	The Patty Duke Show	Ralphie's Father	
1966	What Did You Do in the War, Daddy?	Lumpe	
1966	The Fortune Cookie	TV Director	
1966	Dragnet	Rico 'Ricky' Markell	TV movie
1966	The Party	Director	
1968	Hang 'Em High	Swede	Uncredited
1970	Dragnet	John Sawyer	Episode: "Robbery: The Harassing Wife"
