= The D.A.'s Man =

American TV crime drama series (1959)

- Genre: Crime Drama
- Based on: "The D.A.'s Man", by James D. Horan and Harold R. Danforth
- Starring: John Compton; Ralph Manza; Herb Ellis; Alfred Shelly
- Theme music composer: Frank Comstock
- Composer: Frank Comstock
- Country of origin: United States
- Original language: English
- No. of seasons: 1
- No. of episodes: 26

Production
- Executive producer: Jack Webb
- Producer: Frank La Tourette
- Cinematography: Edward Colman
- Running time: 30 minutes
- Production company: Mark VII Limited

Original release
- Network: NBC
- Release: January 3 – August 29, 1959

The D.A.'s Man is an American television crime drama, produced by Jack Webb, that aired on NBC from January 3, 1959, to August 29, 1959.

== Premise ==
The central character, who went by the single name Shannon, was a private detective who worked for the Manhattan district attorney. Shannon's assignments were given to him by Assistant District Attorney Al Bonacorsi, who also narrated the series. Also seen frequently was Frank LaValle, who worked with Bonacorsi. Topics that Shannon investigated included hijacking rings, narcotics, prostitution, and other illegal activities that provided money to the underworld. His investigations led him to use "a variety of guises to ferret out criminals".

Shannon was not allowed to carry a gun or identification of any kind, and police were often not aware of his position.

== Cast ==
- John Compton as Shannon
- Ralph Manza as Al Bonacorsi
- Herb Ellis as Frank LaValle
- Alfred Shelly as Ed Carney

== Episodes ==
| No. | Title | Directed by | Written by | Original release date |
|---|---|---|---|---|
| 1 | "Sammy's Friend" | Unknown | James E. Moser | January 3, 1959 |
| 2 | "Guns for Hire" | Jack Webb | James E. Moser | January 10, 1959 |
| 3 | "Inside Track" | Jack Webb | James Lee Barrett | January 17, 1959 |
| 4 | "The Unlucky Dutchman" | Ben Alexander | Ken Kolb and James E. Moser | January 24, 1959 |
| 5 | "The Mob Versus O'Hara" | Jack Webb | Otis Carney | January 31, 1959 |
| 6 | "The Pushers" | Robert M. Leeds | Ken Kolb and James E. Moser | February 7, 1959 |
| 7 | "Iron Mike Benedict" | Ben Alexander | Richard Matheson and Charles Beaumont | February 16, 1959 |
| 8 | "Find Ezra Kane" | Unknown | Unknown | February 21, 1959 |
| 9 | "A Girl's Best Friend" | Unknown | Unknown | March 7, 1959 |
| 10 | "The Witness" | Harold Schuster | Story by : Bruce Geller; Teleplay by : Bruce Geller and Jack Webb | March 14, 1959 |
| 11 | "Two for Shakespeare" | Unknown | Unknown | March 21, 1959 |
| 12 | "Moonshine in Manhattan" | Robert M. Leeds | Bill S. Ballinger and Otis Carney | March 28, 1959 |
| 13 | "Iron Star" | Harold Schuster | Otis Carney | April 4, 1959 |
| 14 | "Jail Watch" | Harold Schuster | Ken Kolb | April 11, 1959 |
| 15 | "Shakedown" | Harold Schuster | John Dunkel | April 18, 1959 |
| 16 | "Corky" | Harold Schuster | Story by : Dan Ullman; Teleplay by : Dan Ullman and William Driskill | April 25, 1959 |
| 17 | "The Club Fighter" | Robert M. Leeds | William Driskill | May 2, 1959 |
| 18 | "The Triangle" | Robert M. Leeds | Story by : Charles Beaumont; Teleplay by : Charles Beaumont and William Driskill | May 9, 1959 |
| 19 | "Mr. Respectable" | Harold Schuster | Story by : David Swift; Teleplay by : William Driskill | May 16, 1959 |
| 20 | "Bajour" | Harold Schuster | William Driskill | May 23, 1959 |
| 21 | "Mr. Santa Claus" | Robert M. Leeds | Story by : Ken Kolb; Teleplay by : James E. Moser and William Driskill | May 30, 1959 |
| 22 | "The Actress" | Harold Schuster | William Driskill | June 6, 1959 |
| 23 | "Manhattan Gigolo" | Robert M. Leeds | Story by : Lawrence Resner and William Driskill; Teleplay by : William Driskill | June 13, 1959 |
| 24 | "Out of Town" | Harold Schuster | Story by : Edmund Morris and William Driskill; Teleplay by : William Driskill | June 20, 1959 |
| 25 | "The Duke" | Robert M. Leeds | William Driskill | June 27, 1959 |
| 26 | "Flight 729" | Robert M. Leeds | William Driskill | July 4, 1959 |

== Production ==
The program was based on the book The D.A.'s Man by Harold Danforth and James B. Horan, which was "a nonfiction novel based on Danforth's real-life experiences as a special investigator for the NYC Special Rackets Prosecutor and the Manhattan DA's office." It was produced by Mark VII Limited. It replaced The Ed Wynn Show at 10:30 to 11 p.m. Eastern Time on Saturdays.

Webb was the executive producer, and Frank LaTourette was the producer. Danforth was the technical advisor. Webb and Ben Alexander were among the directors. Writers included Charles Beaumont and Richard Matheson.

Liggett & Myers, for Chesterfield King and L&M cigarettes, sponsored the program. George Stevens Jr. and Webb were among the directors.
