= Navy Bound =

1951 film

- Theatrical release poster
- Directed by: Paul Landres
- Screenplay by: Samuel Roeca
- Based on: Navy Bound by Talbert Josselyn
- Produced by: William F. Broidy
- Starring: Tom Neal; Wendy Waldron; Regis Toomey; John Abbott; Murray Alper; Paul Bryar
- Cinematography: Harry Neumann
- Edited by: Otho Lovering
- Production company: William F. Broidy Productions
- Distributed by: Monogram Pictures
- Release date: March 4, 1951
- Running time: 61 minutes
- Country: United States
- Language: English

Navy Bound is a 1951 American drama film directed by Paul Landres, written by Samuel Roeca and starring Tom Neal, Wendy Waldron, Regis Toomey, John Abbott, Murray Alper and Paul Bryar. The film was released on March 4, 1951 by Monogram Pictures.

== Cast ==
- Tom Neal as Joe Morelli
- Wendy Waldron as Lisa
- Regis Toomey as Capt. Charles Danning
- John Abbott as Pappa Cerrano
- Murray Alper as Chris 'Warthog' Novak
- Paul Bryar as Robert Garrells
- Harvey Parry as Dan Sweeney
- Ric Roman as Tony Cerrano
- John Compton as Vincent Cerrano
- Stephen S. Harrison as Pietro Cerrano
- Billy Bletcher as Schott
- Ray Kemper as Sailor

== See also ==
- Army Bound
