= Dragnet (1967 TV series) =

American crime drama television series (1967–1970)

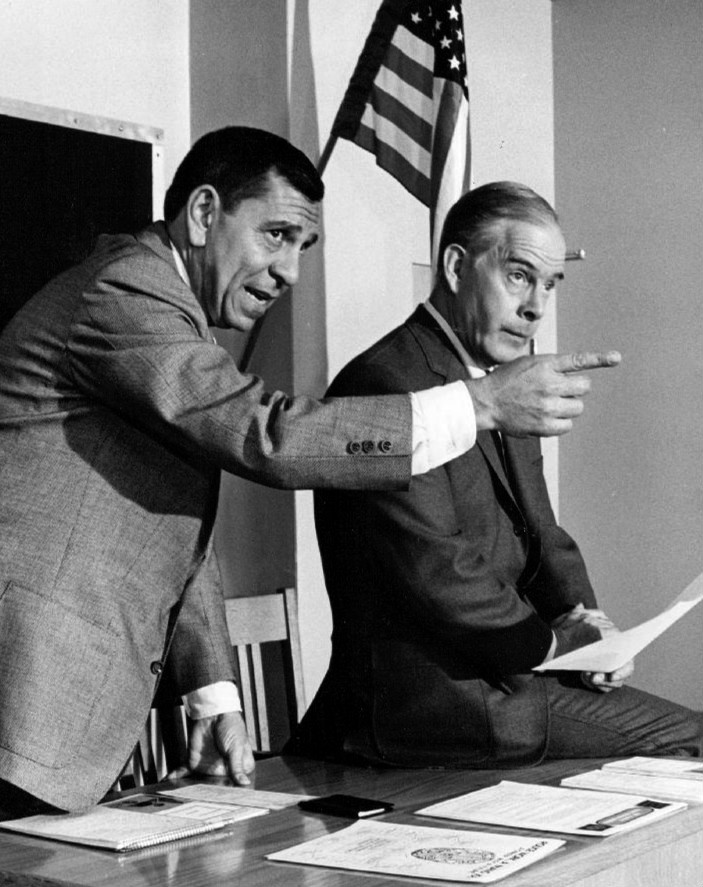
- Jack Webb and Harry Morgan in Dragnet, 1968
- Genre: Police procedural
- Created by: Jack Webb
- Directed by: Jack Webb
- Starring: Jack Webb; Harry Morgan
- Narrated by: Jack Webb
- No. of seasons: 4
- No. of episodes: 98

Production
- Producer: Jack Webb
- Cinematography: Alric Edens; Andrew Jackson; Benjamin H. Kline
- Production companies: Dragnet Productions; Mark VII Limited; Universal Television

Original release
- Network: NBC
- Release: January 12, 1967 – April 16, 1970

Related
- Dragnet (franchise)

Dragnet is an American crime drama television series starring Jack Webb and Harry Morgan which ran for four seasons, from January 12, 1967, to April 16, 1970. To differentiate it from the earlier 1950s Dragnet television series, the year in which each season ended was made part of the on-screen title—the series started as Dragnet 1967 and ended as Dragnet 1970. The entire series aired Thursdays at 9:30–10:00 pm (ET) and was directed by Jack Webb.

All four seasons of this series have been released on DVD; Season 1 ("Dragnet 1967") by Universal Studios Home Entertainment, and seasons 2 ("1968"), 3 ("1969") and 4 ("1970") by Shout! Factory.

This was the second television series in a Dragnet media franchise encompassing film, television, books and comics. It has the distinction of being one of the first examples of a discontinued American TV series being revived years later with some original cast members.

== Cast ==
- Jack Webb as Sgt. Joe Friday
- Harry Morgan as Officer Bill Gannon

Actors playing multiple roles during the series run include Art Balinger, Jill Banner, Harry Bartell, William Boyett, Robert Brubaker, Sidney Clute, Howard Culver, Ed Deemer, Don Dubbins, Anthony Eisley, Art Gilmore, Virginia Gregg, Stacy Harris, Bert Holland, Clark Howat, Marco Lopez, Kent McCord, James McEachin, Ralph Moody, Stuart Nisbet, Robert Patten, Vic Perrin, Don Ross, Jack Sheldon, Alfred Shelly, Olan Soule, Don Stewart, Bobby Troup, Herb Vigran, Virginia Vincent, Len Wayland, and Peggy Webber.

== Series overview ==
Typically, each episode begins with stock footage of Los Angeles over Sgt. Joe Friday's introduction, "This is the city." Friday then specifies the day and time with a description of the watch, or shift, he and Gannon are working. The two investigate each case that arises with Friday, usually, the lead investigator. Although always polite and professional, Friday's manner of questioning witnesses, or suspects, is terse, clipped and rigid, resulting in rapid dialogue. If a witness begins providing irrelevant details, Friday often responds, "Ma’am (Sir), we just want to get the facts." At the end of each episode, the legal fate of the arrested suspects is revealed. Friday and Gannon are rarely shown outside their professional relationship. Gannon occasionally refers to his wife, Eileen, and family; and, sometimes encourages Friday, who is single, to have more of a social life. In a rare departure from the crime drama, a 1968 episode titled "Homicide: DR-06," depicts Friday inviting the Gannons to his apartment for a steak dinner, only to have the evening constantly interrupted by other tenants seeking Friday's assistance.

Season	On-screen title	Episodes	Premiered	Ended	DVD box sets	
Season	On-screen title	Episodes	Premiered	Ended	Release date	Company
1	Dragnet 1967	17	January 12, 1967	May 11, 1967	June 7, 2005	Universal
2	Dragnet 1968	28	September 14, 1967	March 28, 1968	July 6, 2010	Shout! Factory
3	Dragnet 1969	27	September 19, 1968	April 17, 1969	December 17, 2010	Shout! Factory
4	Dragnet 1970	26	September 18, 1969	April 16, 1970	April 12, 2011	Shout! Factory

=== TV movie ===
In 1965 Jack Webb was approached by Universal Pictures to produce a Dragnet television movie to air on NBC. NBC programming director Mort Werner was impressed with the film and decided there was more value in developing Dragnet as a weekly TV series. Webb was more interested in continuing the franchise with TV movies, but ultimately agreed. The movie would not be released until January 27, 1969 (midway through the third season of the TV series) on The NBC Monday Movie, with the promotional title World Premiere: Dragnet.

The working title in the film's script was Dragnet 1966, although the official title is simply Dragnet. The movie is commonly referred to as Dragnet 1966 to distinguish it from other works in the franchise. This movie is included as an extra in the Dragnet 1968 DVD set.

Title	Directed by	Written by	Original release date
Dragnet	Jack Webb	Richard L. Breen	January 27, 1969
Sergeant Joe Friday is called back from vacation to work with his partner, Officer Bill Gannon, on a missing persons case. Two amateur female models and a young war widow have vanished, having been last seen with one J. Johnson. The investigation leads them to a dead man found at a vacant lot, but they remain unsure if the man is J. Johnson. Meanwhile, Gannon tries to avoid a forced retirement brought about by health concerns. The story is based on the Harvey Glatman serial killer case.

== Episodes ==
All episodes of the series were directed by Jack Webb.

=== Season 1 (Dragnet 1967) ===
No. overall	No. in season	Title	Written by	Original release date
1	1	"The LSD Story"	Jack Webb (Credited as John Randolph)	January 12, 1967
Sergeant Joe Friday and his partner Bill Gannon investigate a freaked-out young LSD user, but find themselves unable to do anything to help as, at the time, LSD was not a controlled substance. In 1997, TV Guide ranked this episode #85 on its list of the 100 Greatest Episodes.
2	2	"The Big Explosion"	Robert C. Dennis	January 19, 1967
Two men rob a construction site of multiple cases of extremely powerful dynamite. When Friday and Gannon track down the primary thief, a fervent neo-Nazi, they find he has planted a bomb somewhere in Los Angeles. A prolonged interrogation goes nowhere until Friday is able to use his incessant demand for the current time against him, allowing the LAPD to locate the bomb inside an integrated school and defuse it. Future Adam-12 star Kent McCord appears as a patrolman.
3	3	"The Kidnapping"	Preston Wood	January 26, 1967
Friday and Gannon must help cosmetics employee Janet Ohrmand (Peggy Webber) rescue her boss, who has been taken hostage and held for $75,000 ransom.
4	4	"The Interrogation"	Preston Wood	February 9, 1967
A new officer (Kent McCord) has been arrested for robbing a liquor store while on an undercover assignment. During interrogation, the officer reveals that his girlfriend does not want him to be a police officer, which embitters him as the interrogation proceeds. In the end, the officer is cleared after a nearly-identical suspect confesses to the crime.
5	5	"The Masked Bandits"	David H. Vowell	February 16, 1967
Four bandits wearing red masks commit a series of robberies. Friday and Gannon uncover the gang after they learn one of them is a teenager married to an older woman.
6	6	"The Bank Examiner Swindle"	William O'Halloran	February 23, 1967
Friday and Gannon must stop two con men posing as bank examiners who are scamming the elderly out of their life savings. Harriet MacGibbon and Burt Mustin guest star as bunco con victims.
7	7	"The Hammer"	Henry Irving	March 2, 1967
An elderly apartment manager is found dead in his room, beaten to death with a hammer. A report of a stolen car belonging to another tenant helps Friday and Gannon track the killer to Cottonwood, Arizona, where the suspect is being held for separate crimes.
8	8	"The Candy Store Robberies"	Robert C. Dennis	March 9, 1967
Friday and Gannon try to figure out the pattern to a series of armed robberies at a specific chain of candy stores. Things take a turn when the suspect suddenly changes their pattern. The solution comes when they discover that there are two suspects.
9	9	"The Fur Job"	David H. Vowell	March 16, 1967
Friday and Gannon investigate the theft of expensive fur coats from a high-end clothing store. When they deduce that the thieves are familiar with fur quality, Gannon goes undercover as a buyer to catch the thieves as they attempt to sell their stolen wares.
10	10	"The Jade Story"	William O'Halloran	March 23, 1967
Over $200,000 worth of imperial jade is reported stolen from the Bel-Air estate of a wealthy woman, but the investigation uncovers discrepancies. After consulting a jade dealer and the woman's insurance company's investigator, Friday and Gannon believe a swindle is being made, even when it is found that a man did break into the estate.
11	11	"The Shooting"	David H. Vowell	March 30, 1967
A police officer (Don Marshall) is shot during a traffic stop on a pair of paroled convicts parked in a stolen car near a liquor store; the officer recovers, but has no memory of the shooting. The investigation slows until an informant's tip brings Friday and Gannon to a flophouse, but even after arresting two men the officer cannot remember them — a fact Friday can use against the suspects.
12	12	"The Hit and Run Driver"	David H. Vowell	April 6, 1967
Friday and Gannon investigate a hit-and-run that kills an elderly couple. Though the case is publicized, several leads go nowhere. When Friday and Gannon finally catch the suspect, a smug businessman with little respect for the victims and his wife, they are dismayed by his lenient sentence. Ultimately, he loses his legs in another fatal at-fault accident.
13	13	"The Bookie"	Preston Wood	April 13, 1967
Friday goes undercover with the Department's chaplain in order to break up an illegal gambling ring.
14	14	"The Subscription Racket"	Henry Irving	April 20, 1967
After an appearance on a local television talk show, Friday learns about a scam artist with a novel twist: the scammer uses an authentic Congressional Medal of Honor to solicit magazine subscriptions. Friday and Gannon root out the con artist when a check paid by one of the victims is altered and the scammer's ex-employer agrees to locate him.
15	15	"The Gun"	Henry Irving	April 27, 1967
A Japanese widow is senselessly murdered, leaving her small daughter an orphan. The murder affects even Friday, who has a hard time controlling his emotions while seeking her killer. The investigation stagnates until the detectives follow a tip provided earlier for a completely different crime in the same neighborhood, and the other victim identifies the suspect.
16	16	"The Big Kids"	David H. Vowell	May 4, 1967
Friday and Gannon investigate a gang of juvenile thieves who have been stealing petty items in order to gain membership into an exclusive club.
17	17	"The Bullet"	John Robinson	May 11, 1967
A man is found shot to death in a locked room. The case is initially ruled a suicide until the medical examiner reports that he was shot twice and that a different caliber handgun was used. Though the detectives initially suspect his wife killed him, the real suspect, the wife's elderly mother, reveals herself.

=== Season 2 (Dragnet 1968) ===
No. overall	No. in season	Title	Written by	Original release date
18	1	"The Grenade"	Robert C. Dennis	September 14, 1967
An emotionally unstable teenager throws acid on the back of another student (Jan-Michael Vincent). When a follow-up investigation reveals he possesses a live hand grenade that is suspiciously no longer in his room, the LAPD races to locate him before he can harm another person.
19	2	"The Shooting Board"	David H. Vowell	September 21, 1967
After a regular day shift, Friday visits a laundrette while off-duty to buy cigarettes, when he discovers a burglar stealing money from the business. When the burglar shoots at Friday, he fires back; the burglar is struck but escapes with his girlfriend and is later found dead. The shooting is routinely investigated by the Scientific Investigation Division (SID), but Friday finds his career in jeopardy when the investigators cannot find proof that the man shot at him, let alone that he had a weapon. As the shooting board discusses their final verdict, proof is finally found when investigators take a closer look at a small mark in the laundrette. This episode was later remade on Quincy, M.E. as "A Dead Man's Truth".
20	3	"The Badge Racket"	Robert C. Dennis	September 28, 1967
Three con artists (Harry Lauter, Stacy Harris, Indus Arthur) have been swindling businessmen from out of town by posing as a prostitute and two vice detectives, tricking victims into paying the woman's "bail". Friday and Gannon go undercover in a hotel, with Gannon pretending to be a manufacturer from Lincoln, Nebraska.
21	4	"The Bank Jobs"	Robert C. Dennis	October 5, 1967
Friday and Gannon investigate a bank robbery committed by a man and a woman. Tracking their car down to a woman who matches a suspect's exact description, initially lies to them, and is already on probation, the detectives are certain they have a suspect, until more reports come in of other women being forced to rob a bank in the same way. Though the first woman is cleared of wrongdoing, the suspect's spree continues unabated until one victim fights back. Future Adam-12 star Kent McCord appears as an unnamed "officer".
22	5	"The Big Neighbor"	Robert C. Dennis	October 12, 1967
In a sitcom-esque change of formula, Gannon invites Joe to dinner and a televised football game at his home in Eagle Rock, California, but their afternoon is interrupted by neighbors asking Gannon for help with miscellany on the basis that he is a police officer. The mood shifts when a neighbor calls to report an actual emergency.
23	6	"The Big Frustration"	Sidney Morse	October 19, 1967
Sergeant Carl Maxwell, a fellow detective, goes AWOL after a case he worked on is dismissed; Friday and Gannon are given three days to track him down before Maxwell is terminated from the LAPD. When they find him drinking in a resort, he rants about the stresses of policing and claims he is a minority for being a cop, but a speech from Friday persuades him to go back. Bill Williams as Sgt. Bill Riddle, John Lupton as Sgt. Carl Maxwell
24	7	"The Senior Citizen"	Henry Irving	October 26, 1967
A series of daring daylight house burglaries take place, seemingly planned from wedding, funeral, and event notices in local newspapers. Friday and Gannon's investigation leads to an octogenarian (Burt Mustin) who, while very eccentric, is not clearly the suspect. A deeper investigation into his background reveals he is actually a repeat cat burglar.
25	8	"The Big High"	David H. Vowell	November 2, 1967
An elderly businessman, concerned about the welfare of his grandchild, informs Friday and Gannon that his daughter and son-in-law are using marijuana regularly. The young couple make no apologies for their lifestyle, but their constant drug use, paired with their poor parenting, leads to a horrible tragedy.
26	9	"The Big Ad"	Charles A. McDaniel	November 9, 1967
An ex-con named Steve Deal (Don Dubbins) contacts the LAPD when a classified ad that he placed, offering to do "anything" for money, results in a cryptic offer to commit murder. Friday and Gannon investigate, and Friday goes undercover as Deal to meet the suspect, a wealthy man who makes him go through a series of dead-end drives to prove his bonafides, then sets up the murder—the target is his wife. When Friday "kills" her, the suspect arrives to shoot the "intruder", but other officers arrive just before he can pull the trigger.
27	10	"The Missing Realtor"	Robert C. Dennis	November 16, 1967
A female real estate agent goes missing and turns up dead in a vacant house. The only suspect, the woman's ex-boyfriend, is cleared. Suddenly, the victim's credit card starts getting billed for purchases she could not have made. When more reports of credit card thefts from realtors come in, Friday and Gannon identify and catch the suspect right before he can strike again.
28	11	"The Big Dog"	Henry Irving	November 23, 1967
Friday and Gannon are assigned to an unusual case: reports of a dog stealing purses and running off with them. The investigation becomes even stranger when the victims give different descriptions of the dog. Officer Dorothy Miller and other female officers go undercover to catch the dog in the act; when a theft occurs right in front of Miller, Friday and Gannon pursue and corner the suspect, and find more than one dog with him—all stolen.
29	12	"The Pyramid Swindle"	Norman Lessing	November 30, 1967
A female con-artist (Virginia Gregg) uses an evangelistic approach to lure buyers into her pyramid scheme. The Fraud Division is unable to charge her with false advertising, so they prosecute her for operating a lottery. When the case goes to trial, the con-artist appears to have an air-tight defense until the prosecuting attorney (Bert Fields) finds a fatal gap in the con's logic.
30	13	"The Phony Police Racket"	Henry Irving	December 7, 1967
When the LAPD receives an angry complaint against a (nonexistent) "Captain Paul G. Fremont", Friday and Gannon investigate a scam involving the Los Angeles branch of the "National Association for Law Enforcement", a phony police organization and magazine, which comes with a courtesy card for subscribers supposedly entitling the bearer to preferential treatment from the police. Friday and Gannon go undercover with a construction worker scheduled to meet with "Sergeant Densmore", who brings them to NALE's headquarters, allowing them to shut down the operation for good. Officer Jim Reed from Adam-12 cameos.
31	14	"The Trial Board"	Sidney Morse	December 14, 1967
A police officer is accused of taking a bribe from a professional bookie. The officer has picked Friday to represent him at his trial board hearing. In spite of witness claims, the officer insists he refused the bookie's offer. It takes a close examination of the bookie's checkbook for Friday and the board to learn what really happened: the bookie was simply repaying the officer a loan from their military service days, and he committed perjury after the officer refused to get Vice Division to turn a blind eye to him in return.
32	15	"The Christmas Story"	Richard L. Breen	December 21, 1967
A figure of baby Jesus is stolen from a church's nativity scene set. Friday and Gannon are tasked with finding it before Christmas—which is in less than 48 hours. After checking people of interest but gaining no progress, the detectives are dismayed to learn it is almost Christmas, but when they return to the church to update the priest on the case, a small boy arrives to return the figure, explaining that he simply wanted to give it a ride in his new red wagon. This episode is a remake of the 1953 Dragnet episode "The Big Little Jesus".
33	16	"The Big Shipment"	David H. Vowell	December 28, 1967
A light plane crashes in the San Fernando Valley, carrying several pounds of drugs and a note in the cockpit requesting a drop five hours from then. By the time the pilot, who fled the scene, is found, there is only an hour left; the pilot reluctantly gives up the drop location, and the Narcotics Division ambushes the collection team. The two suspects attempt to trick the detectives by pretending one is blind and dumb, but Friday sees through their act and gets them to identify their boss.
34	17	"The Big Search"	Preston Wood and Robert Soderberg	January 4, 1968
Two small girls, ages three and five, go missing. Their mother is certain that her ex-husband, an alcoholic, has kidnapped them. However, he has since cleaned up his act and has no knowledge of the girls' whereabouts. The search seems hopeless until Friday and Gannon, acting on information about a former neighbor and her dog, go to her apartment and find the girls safe with the dog. They deduce that the dog had returned to its old neighborhood, and the girls played with the dog and followed it back.
35	18	"The Big Prophet"	David H. Vowell	January 11, 1968
Friday and Gannon are convinced that "Brother" William Bentley, a man convicted of defrauding elderly ladies of their pension checks, is operating the Temple of the Expanded Mind as a front for him to sell LSD to the students of a nearby elementary school. Though they are unable to arrest Bentley, Friday and Gannon debate him on drug policy before they leave. Later, Bentley is arrested for attempting to sell narcotics to a minor.
36	19	"The Big Amateur"	Henry Irving	January 25, 1968
Angelenos are full of praise for Officer Gideon C. Dengle; they want to bestow him with awards, honors and treats. But the LAPD encounters a problem with Officer Dengle: he isn't actually a police officer. Witness questioning only leads to praise from various citizens who genuinely believe Dengle is a real LAPD officer. None of his behavior is malicious, to the point that even the tickets he issues direct payment to the LAPD, not himself. Eventually, the detectives are informed Dengle has "retired" from the LAPD, only for reports to come in of Dengle directing traffic at a residential fire, now "working" for the LAFD. Friday and Gannon arrive at the scene, where they meet Dengle himself; as they take him into custody, he reads his own rights and explains his knowledge of procedure: he was once a real police officer himself.
37	20	"The Big Starlet"	Robert C. Dennis	February 1, 1968
A woman reports her teenage niece has run away, intent on becoming a film star in Hollywood. Friday and Gannon investigate and learn she has wound up in pornographic films. Working with Vice Division, the detectives question a former porn star and interrogate a porn film producer, eventually locating her rooming house. However, they find that she has killed herself by overdosing on barbiturates.
38	21	"The Big Clan"	Michael Donovan	February 8, 1968
While investigating a fortune telling scam, Friday is offered a bribe to assist a Romani family trying to gain control of the Romani community in Los Angeles. Going along with their operation, Friday is ordered to protect the family's businesses and harass other Romani businesses until all Romani businesses in the city are theirs. Working a sting operating with Miller, the family is brought in.
39	22	"The Little Victim"	Robert Soderberg	February 15, 1968
While doing a speech on child abuse, Friday and Gannon are called to investigate the beating of a nine-month-old boy. The detectives investigate the parents, Walter (Kiel Martin) and Louise Marshall (Brooke Bundy), who are more concerned about their failing relationship than their child. When they interview the parents, they learn Walter is abusive and Louise is unusually clingy to her husband. Walter is promptly arrested and imprisoned for a year, while Louise is placed on probation. However, after Walter is released from prison, the detectives respond to Louise's apartment again, where they find Walter has killed the baby.
40	23	"The Big Squeeze"	Jerry D. Lewis	February 22, 1968
Friday and Gannon interrogate an ex-con accused of extortion. He calmly and smugly insists that he is innocent, but Friday and Gannon have a surprise for him: taped conversations and a voice analysis device. In the end, he also admits to murder.
41	24	"The Suicide Attempt"	Robert C. Dennis	February 29, 1968
Friday and Gannon learn that a man has called his mother from Hollywood "to say goodbye". After interviewing his dismissive wife, the detectives speak to his sister and attempt to trace his location when he calls her; though he hangs up before he can say where he is, they learn he is attempting to overdose on barbiturates. The phone company manages to trace him to the Hollywood Elsinore hotel, but the detectives cannot find his room. They identify a go-go dancer he conversed with and, using the description of the view from his window he mentioned to her, they finally locate his room. The man is hospitalized, institutionalized by the request of his sister, and eventually released.
42	25	"The Big Departure"	Preston Wood	March 7, 1968
Friday and Gannon investigate a series of thefts and burglaries from various stores across the city. They note the thefts appear to be basic necessities, such as food, tools, camping gear, and medicine. The investigation leads to a group of rebellious juveniles who are determined to start their own utopian society on a remote island off the coast of California. Friday and Gannon interrogate the group and deconstruct the unrealistic idea of their utopia before taking them in.
43	26	"The Investigation"	Robert C. Dennis	March 14, 1968
Friday is screening applicants for the Los Angeles Police Academy with a civilian review panel. Friday and Gannon review several applicants and check their background information. One particular applicant, Harry Lanham, seems to qualify, but a deeper search reveals concerning behavior. Though the detectives get most of his story, they find six months are missing from his application. Taking a lengthy detour to investigate further, they learn he worked for a small town police department for those six months and was fired for excessive force. Satisfied with their investigation, the detectives finish their background check trip, and Lanham's application is declined.
44	27	"The Big Gambler"	Robert Soderberg	March 21, 1968
Over $100,000 has been embezzled from an industrial company. An investigation of the employees leads Friday and Gannon to a habitual gambler. They follow him to a legal casino outside Los Angeles, and arrest him for embezzlement. While being interrogated, the man admits to embezzlement and his gambling problem, and the detectives advise him to seek therapy. Comedian Buddy Lester plays a bartender.
45	28	"The Big Problem"	Michael Donovan	March 28, 1968
Friday and Gannon are tasked with handling community relations between the LAPD and the citizenry. An African-American couple file a complaint against a pair of officers who treated them like criminals during a traffic stop; Friday and Gannon explain that their vehicle simply matched a wanted vehicle connected to burglaries in their area, and Friday later chastises the officers for their antagonizing behavior on patrol. Later, a young African-American man who stormed out of an earlier citizen's group meeting barricades himself in his apartment rather than submit to a traffic warrant; Friday reassures him that, contrary to his beliefs, the police are not trying to harm him, and the man submits and is simply fined in court for the traffic offense. At the end of the episode, real-life LAPD Chief Thomas Reddin makes a plea for a mutual understanding between the community, the viewer, and the police.

=== Season 3 (Dragnet 1969) ===
No. overall	No. in season	Title	Written by	Original release date
46	1	"Public Affairs (DR-07)"	Burt Prelutsky	September 19, 1968
Friday and Gannon are invited to appear on a television show to debate police issues with a social professor and a hippie activist. Howard Hesseman guest stars as the hippie activist (credited as "Don Sturdy", which he used as his on-air name when employed as a radio DJ).
47	2	"Juvenile (DR-05)"	Robert C. Dennis	September 26, 1968
Friday and Gannon act as the night watch commanders for the juvenile division. They encounter several unusual incidents, including a runaway from New York City, an abandoned baby in Dorothy Miller's care and a high Buddhist.
48	3	"Community Relations (DR-10)"	Alf Harris	October 3, 1968
Friday and Gannon attempt to recruit minority candidates from a community-centered sponsored job development group. They seek African-American Officer Dave Evans to help them, as many of the group members know and respect him. But when Evans' house is attacked for his job and race, he considers retirement, citing a lack of respect from anyone, and the community group loses interest. Evans eventually changes his mind when he defuses a potentially inflammatory incident between a black man and a white man without assistance or having to arrest anyone, and is thanked by bystanders; the community group regains interest, and 90% of the applicants are hired by the LAPD. O. J. Simpson appears (uncredited) as one of the job developer group.
49	4	"Management Services (DR-11)"	James Doherty	October 10, 1968
In the aftermath of the assassination of Dr. Martin Luther King Jr., Friday and Gannon are assigned to the department's Emergency Control Center, as the LAPD attempts to calm the public.
50	5	"Police Commission (DR-13)"	Robert I. Holt	October 17, 1968
Friday and Gannon crack down on "wildcatters", freelance tow truck drivers who victimize motorists.
51	6	"Homicide (DR-06)"	Robert C. Dennis	October 24, 1968
Friday hosts a dinner party at his apartment, providing insight into the nature of a bachelor officer's private life.
52	7	"Robbery (DR-15)"	James Doherty	November 7, 1968
Friday and Gannon are on day watch, robbery division desk duty. As in other desk duty episodes, we see a variety of the activities which the division undertakes during a typical shift. This time they show us a worrisome stakeout replete with radio breakdowns, tailing suspects, a truck hijacking, various people with mental issues, a career criminal who wears an Army jacket and causes Friday to lose his cool, a bank robbery netting $50,000 and a charge of felony murder, and a teenage hero who jogs, among other events. William Boyett, "Sgt. MacDonald" from Adam-12, guest-stars as "Sgt. Bill Pailing".
53	8	"Public Affairs (DR-12)"	Jerry Cohen and James Doherty	November 14, 1968
Friday and Gannon assist the Secret Service with preparations for a visit to Los Angeles by the President of the United States.
54	9	"Training (DR-18)"	Robert C. Dennis	November 21, 1968
A female magazine writer is doing a story about female cadets at the police academy. Her chosen subject for the story is a fledgling policewoman, whom Friday helps deal with her unsupportive boyfriend.
55	10	"Public Affairs (DR-14)"	Alf Harris	November 28, 1968
Friday and Gannon work with store owners to prevent crime in the area, despite the obstinacy of some of them.
56	11	"Narcotics (DR-16)"	Burt Prelutsky	December 5, 1968
After a teenage boy has a bad LSD trip, a local businessman presents a novel new idea to the LAPD: assist teenagers in selling the other side of the drug trade, not using. NOTE: This is a dramatized telling of the creation of the SmartTeens program.
57	12	"Internal Affairs (DR-20)"	James Doherty	December 12, 1968
Friday and Gannon investigate an officer accused of police brutality after a drunk driving arrest. Officers Pete Malloy (Martin Milner) and Jim Reed (Kent McCord), the main characters of Adam-12, appear as witnesses regarding the incident. Note: This episode was filmed on the Adam-12 stationhouse set.
58	13	"Community Relations (DR-17)"	Alf Harris	January 2, 1969
Friday and Gannon attend an LAPD retreat on improving community relationships at a Lake Arrowhead conference center owned by the University of California. Participants end up coming up with ideas and learning about themselves.
59	14	"Homicide (DR-22)"	James Doherty	January 9, 1969
Friday and Gannon investigate the murder of a woman in her own apartment. The apartment manager, Calvin Lampe (Burt Mustin) seems to know facts about the case before either Friday or Gannon. His palm print is on a recently painted wall close to the murder and he seems to have an answer for every question proposed by Friday or Gannon. They take him downtown to take his statement, ask him additional questions, and end up breaking the case when their superior recognizes Lampe as a retired distinguished Chicago PD detective.
60	15	"B.O.D. (DR-27)"	James Doherty	January 23, 1969
Friday and Gannon work in the Los Angeles Business Office covering various situations. Like "Juvenile (DR-05)", the detectives handle multiple unusual incidents, though generally more serious, such as reports of an incoming tidal wave from Japan due to hit in eight hours, a diabetic needing medical treatment, peaceful protesters who disrupt the BOD, a person who threatens to commit suicide because he believes extraterrestrials are after him, a lost boy, and an officer getting shot on duty. Grant Williams as Father Barnes
61	16	"Narcotics (DR-21)"	Burt Prelutsky	January 30, 1969
Friday, Gannon, and Captain Al Trembly create a new idea to find marijuana at the Los Angeles International Airport: Ginger, the first marijuana-sniffing dog.
62	17	"Administrative Vice (DR-29)"	James Doherty	February 6, 1969
While Gannon is out sick (because Harry Morgan was sick in real life), Friday gets a temporary partner. His new partner (Anthony Eisley) is a police lieutenant from Century City Administrative Vice who sets Friday up and offers him a bribe. Harry Morgan appears only briefly at the end of this episode.
63	18	"The Joy Riders"	Preston Wood	February 13, 1969
17-year-old Hal Rustin (Michael Burns) is a car thief whose mother Eunice Rustin (Peggy Webber) is helpless to stop him. He is given a tour of the jail in an attempt to impress him of the consequences for choosing crime. But it doesn't work, and he later kills someone with a shotgun. Note: Harry Morgan had a bloody nose the night before filming. This episode was originally scheduled to be the final episode of the second season, to be aired on April 4, 1968. However, NBC coverage of the assassination of Martin Luther King Jr. preempted the program.
64	19	"Frauds (DR-28)"	Burt Prelutsky	February 20, 1969
A computer puts Sgt. Friday and Officer Gannon on the trail of an embezzlement ring that involves "master of disguise" Paul Nichols (John Gilgreen) and his girlfriend Peggy Sue Thompson. Landlady Elvira Norton (Florence Lake) helps capture the culprits.
65	20	"Juvenile (DR-19)"	Robert C. Dennis and James Doherty	February 27, 1969
Friday and Gannon investigate the disappearance of a nine-year-old boy from school. They discover the boy hiding from people, and after taking him to the hospital, find that he has been viciously flogged.
66	21	"Burglary (DR-31)"	Burt Prelutsky	March 6, 1969
A costumed thief calling himself "The Crimson Crusader" has been stealing comic books, movie posters and publicity photos of various superheroes.
67	22	"Vice (DR-30)"	James Doherty	March 13, 1969
Friday and Gannon go undercover at a hotel to find the location of an illegal gambling operation. Soon after spreading the word they're looking for some action, they're driven to a late-night game in the Hollywood Hills. After the game the detectives give the location of the residence to their boss, and a raid is set for the following night. At the end Friday explains to a surprised female accomplice how her boss had been cheating with a deck of marked cards.
68	23	"Forgery (DR-33)"	Burt Prelutsky	March 20, 1969
Friday and Gannon investigate the theft of payroll checks, as well as the driver's license and credit cards of an employee, from Monument Studios. The detectives are led to the various homes of hippies, and are helped by a hippie (Gary Crosby) who may have ulterior motives.
69	24	"Juvenile (DR-32)"	Jack E. Barrett and James Doherty	March 27, 1969
Friday and Gannon get help from the California Highway Patrol in searching for two dogs which have bitten a child. The child is allergic to the anti-rabies serum and is scheduled to get a shot that may kill her unless proof is found that the dogs are not rabid.
70	25	"Juvenile (DR-35)"	Burt Prelutsky	April 3, 1969
When a four-day-old baby is found barely alive in an apartment trash receptacle, Friday and Gannon search for the person who abandoned the newborn. Their investigation turns up information from a young man who knew a buddy now in the Army who'd boasted he'd impregnated his girlfriend before being shipped overseas.
71	26	"Frauds (DR-36)"	James Doherty	April 10, 1969
During a routine audit, a local department store discovers the loss of at least $100,000 (about $876,000 in 2025 dollars). Friday and Gannon begin by understanding how the department store handles its credit card department. A pair of supervisors in the credit department may be involved, but both of them have suddenly disappeared after being initially questioned.
72	27	"Intelligence (DR-34)"	James Doherty	April 17, 1969
An old night-school friend with political aspirations invites Friday to an alumni meeting at his home. Friday discovers he is being considered for membership in a militia; Friday declines, but the friend seeks Friday's help in acquiring a Federal Weapons License. Friday uses the job to locate the militia's stash of stolen government weapons and explosives.

=== Season 4 (Dragnet 1970) ===
No. overall	No. in season	Title	Written by	Original release date
73	1	"Personnel – The Shooting"	Michael Donovan	September 18, 1969
Friday and Gannon investigate the robbery of a liquor store that resulted in two officers shot. Friday and Gannon stay with the families, making their time easier, and deal with the outcome once the waiting is over.
74	2	"Homicide – The Student"	Jack Smith	September 25, 1969
Friday and Gannon go after a college student for a double homicide committed with a rifle.
75	3	"S.I.U. – The Ring"	Robert C. Dennis	October 2, 1969
Friday and Gannon, using an informant's "friendly tip," recruit a policewoman to nab a burglar and uncover $25,000 in stolen jewelry from a protected location. S.I.U. is Special Investigation Unit.
76	4	"D.H.Q. – Medical"	Robert C. Dennis	October 9, 1969
Friday and Gannon investigate cases in a hospital emergency ward, including an unbalanced man threatening to shoot a radio talk show host. Cyril Delevanti appears as perennial nuisance Basil Jennings. D.H.Q. is Detective Headquarters.
77	5	"Burglary – Mister"	Burt Prelutsky	October 16, 1969
Friday and Gannon investigate a home burglary where everything is missing, even a blind woman's cane. The case leads them to a plethora of thefts and other crimes committed by an insufferable man who insists he be called "Mister" by anyone associated with him.
78	6	"Juvenile – The Little Pusher"	James Doherty	October 23, 1969
Friday and Gannon investigate the drug overdose of a 12-year-old seventh-grader. The trail leads to a history class, a hippie's boarding house, and death.
79	7	"Homicide – Cigarette Butt"	Alf Harris	October 30, 1969
Self-defense or murder one? The title object plays a key part in determining which occurred when a man shot his girlfriend's lover during an argument.
80	8	"D.H.Q. – Missing Person"	Alf Harris	November 13, 1969
A local high school student goes missing after being called to the vice principal's office to receive an honor. The student had not missed any days of school or been late, which worries the vice principal; she calls the police, who in turn have Friday and Gannon visit her. The case takes Friday and Gannon to a fashion salon, an apartment complex, a friend's home, an optometrist's office, a restaurant, a psychiatrist's office, and finally to the home of the missing person's mother.
81	9	"Burglary Auto – Courtroom"	Jack Barrett	November 20, 1969
Friday and Gannon testify in court against three burglary suspects, but their case is in jeopardy over technicalities, a slick-talking lawyer, and the temporary delay of the state's key witness in appearance.
82	10	"Internal Affairs – Parolee"	Michael Donovan	November 27, 1969
Friday and Gannon retrace a 14-year-old investigation to determine whether charges can be brought against a man up for parole, an investigation that takes a decisive turn when a businessman who had employed the suspect makes a startling admission about the original crime.
83	11	"Burglary Auto – Juvenile Genius"	Michael Donovan	December 4, 1969
Friday and Gannon track down thieves responsible for a series of Los Angeles robberies, all involving a red cloth with an "X" marked on it. Their investigation leads them to unusual burglars and the most unlikely of criminal masterminds.
84	12	"Bunco – $9,000"	Don Kilburn	December 11, 1969
The search is on for a swindler who conned an old vaudevillian out of $9,000 he found on a sidewalk.
85	13	"Narco – Missing Hype"	Michael Donovan	January 8, 1970
This episode focuses on drugs, paying particular attention to addiction symptoms. Friday and Gannon take a special interest in a young addict whom Friday saved from an OD when the addict was 16 years old. The young man has been out of rehab for six months and looks to be using again. Friday wants to get to him before it gets worse or he turns up dead.
86	14	"Burglary – Helpful Woman"	Michael Donovan	January 22, 1970
Friday and Gannon track down a female thief who specializes in elderly people.
87	15	"Homicide – Who Killed Who?"	Michael Donovan	January 29, 1970
Friday and Gannon investigate a multiple homicide shooting that left four people dead.
88	16	"Burglary – The Son"	Robert C. Dennis	February 5, 1970
Friday and Gannon track goods stolen from an upper middle class home through several sources to find the burglar.
89	17	"A.I.D. – The Weekend"	Richard Morgan	February 12, 1970
Friday and Gannon spend the weekend together at Bill's home in Eagle Rock. A magazine saleswoman stops by, as suggested by one of Bill's neighbors. At the end of the episode, the "magazine saleswoman" is arrested for fraud. A.I.D. is Accident Investigation Division.
90	18	"Narco – Pill Maker"	Alf Harris	February 19, 1970
Friday and Gannon, attempting to stop the supply of amphetamine sulfate pills into the area, discover that a factory to make the pills has been set up in a leased residence. They arrest the hired help but still face a race against time to connect the head of the operation to the crime before the hired help pleads guilty.
91	19	"Burglary – The Dognappers"	Michael Donovan	February 26, 1970
Brought to their attention by a member of the Department of Animal Regulation, and with an okay from the Captain, Friday and Gannon investigate a rash of reports of lost dogs from a shopping center. Since only one lost dog had been previously reported from the same area, Friday and Gannon suspect criminal activity.
92	20	"Missing Persons – The Body"	Robert C. Dennis	March 5, 1970
Friday and Gannon spend this episode trying to track down the identity of Jane Doe #37. A ring is about all they have to go on. Anthony Eisley and Luana Patten guest star.
93	21	"Forgery – The Ranger"	Don Kilburn	March 12, 1970
A forest ranger is brought in when checks and credit cards bearing other names than his own are found in his possession after he is stopped for a traffic violation. Even though he seems to be knowledgeable on the subject of forestry, his answers about the cards and checks lead Friday and Gannon to suspect he is a thief just posing as a ranger.
94	22	"D.H.Q. – Night School"	Dick Morgan	March 19, 1970
Friday arrests a fellow student for possession of marijuana after their night school class; this incurs the wrath of Professor Grant, who expels Friday after a vote among the other students at their next meeting. Friday demands a chance to plead his case to the students before a second vote is taken; Grant says he must garner 2/3 of the votes to be reinstated, until one of the other students objects to Grant's tactics.
95	23	"I.A.D. – The Receipt"	Michael Donovan	March 26, 1970
Friday and Gannon investigate two homicide detectives whom a caretaker is accusing of stealing $800 from a dead man's funeral money, leaving only $200 to bury him. I.A.D. is Internal Affairs Division.
96	24	"Robbery – The Harassing Wife"	Alf Harris	April 2, 1970
As Friday and Gannon investigate a series of robberies, a vindictive woman, Jean Sawyer (Peggy Webber), makes a pest of herself by calling headquarters repeatedly to accuse her husband John (Herb Ellis) of the thefts. The detectives investigate John Sawyer and find no evidence against him, but the man responsible for three of the robberies is found and arrested. When a fourth robbery occurs, Mrs. Sawyer again accuses her husband. Is she "crying wolf" again?
97	25	"Burglary – Baseball"	Robert C. Dennis	April 9, 1970
Friday and Gannon investigate a safecracking job worth $1,900 and discover an interesting springtime motive.
98	26	"D.H.Q. – The Victims"	Michael Donovan	April 16, 1970
Friday and Gannon are working the night watch out of the Detective Headquarters, Field Investigative Section. They show a new cop the importance of field officers and the pain of the victims and their friends. The plot lines include two robbery/murders, a purse snatching, and the robbery of a man who lost all his money.
