= John Compton (actor) =

American actor

- Born: John Compton Tolley; June 21, 1923; Lynchburg, Tennessee, U.S.
- Died: May 12, 2015 (aged 91); Los Angeles, California, U.S.
- Occupation: Actor

John Compton (born John Compton Tolley; June 21, 1923 – May 12, 2015) was an American actor. He was born John Compton Tolley in Lynchburg, Tennessee.

In 1943, Compton left Lynchburg and went to Hollywood hoping to become an actor. He washed dishes at a restaurant and spent time around union halls seeking a break in the film industry. His next job was answering a telephone at Columbia Pictures Studio. Eventually he paid $100 to get a bit part in a film, but the results of that appearance offered little hope for his future. He gained experience by acting in other films, in summer stock theater, and on stage in New York.

Compton starred in the television series The D.A.'s Man (1959). He appeared in the films Mildred Pierce, Cheyenne, Jesse James Rides Again, Oh! Susanna, Thunder Over Arizona and Spoilers of the Forest, among others.

Compton also sold real estate in California.

He died of natural causes on May 12, 2015, in Los Angeles, California at age 91.

== Filmography ==
Year	Title	Role	Notes
1945	Pride of the Marines	Corporal	Uncredited
1945	Mildred Pierce	Theodore 'Ted' Ellison Forrester	Uncredited
1945	Too Young to Know	Party Guest #5	
1945	San Antonio	Cowboy	Uncredited
1946	Night and Day	Student	Uncredited
1947	Nora Prentiss	Reporter	Uncredited
1947	Cheyenne	Limpy Bill	
1947	Jesse James Rides Again	Steve Long	Serial
1947	Rock Island Trail	Trooper	Uncredited
1950	The Glass Menagerie	Young Man	
1950	California Passage	Henchman	
1951	Oh! Susanna	Lieutenant Cutter	
1951	Navy Bound	Vincent Cerrano	
1954	Adventures of the Texas Kid: Border Ambush	Baden	
1955	Alfred Hitchcock Presents	Vincent	Season 1 Episode 10: "The Case of Mr. Pelham"
1955	Francis in the Navy	Aide	Uncredited
1956	Alfred Hitchcock Presents	Walter 'Walt' Norton	Season 1 Episode 33: "The Belfry"
1956	Thunder Over Arizona	Tab Warren	
1956	The Ten Commandments	Slave	Uncredited
1956	Friendly Persuasion	Rebel Lieutenant	Uncredited
1957	Spoilers of the Forest	Billy Mitchell	
1959	The D.A.'s Man	Shannon	
