= Ralph Manza =

American actor (1921–2000)

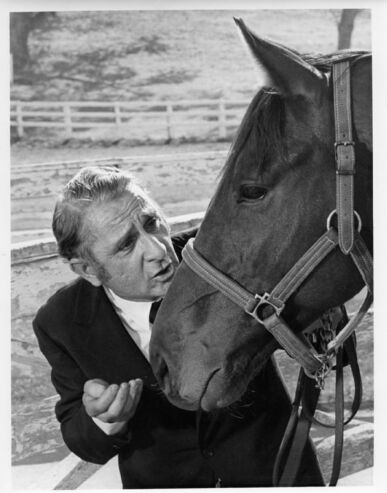
- Ralph Manza in 1974
- Born: Ralph A. Manza, Jr. December 1, 1921; San Francisco, California, U.S.
- Died: January 31, 2000 (aged 78); Encinitas, California, U.S.
- Occupations: Television and film actor
- Years active: 1954–2000
- Spouse: Catherine Manza (m. 1948)
- Children: 4

Ralph Manza (December 1, 1921 – January 31, 2000) was an American character actor who made over 160 appearances in American film and television shows.

== Early years ==
Manza was born in San Francisco on December 1, 1921. His Italian parents wanted him to be a surgeon. A pre-med student at UC-Berkeley in the early 1940s, Manza was drafted into the United States Army during World War II. He was serving as a medic in the Army when he was assigned to an acting troupe. In that capacity he toured Iceland playing in musicals. When he returned after the war, he took classes at Elizabeth Halloway's School of Acting in San Francisco.

== Career ==
The diminutive Manza appeared on daytime television briefly in 1963 as an original cast member of the ABC-TV soap opera series General Hospital, where he played the role of Mike Costello. Manza went on to become a character actor appearing on many primetime TV series in guest role spots, beginning in the 1950s with the TV crime/drama series Highway Patrol, and Alfred Hitchcock Presents.

In 1959 Manza was cast as assistant district attorney Al Bonacorsi in the NBC-TV series The D.A.'s Man. At that time he had been driving a taxi at night in Hollywood for three years.

This part of his acting career continued to flourish through the 1960s, with appearances on such shows as 77 Sunset Strip, McHale's Navy, Perry Mason, The Twilight Zone, Gomer Pyle - U.S.M.C. and Gunsmoke, continuing in the 1970s and 1980s on such series such as Get Smart, My Three Sons, Night Gallery, Police Woman, Hart to Hart, Chico and the Man, Barney Miller (in 7 episodes), Benson, Simon & Simon, Night Court, The Golden Girls, Newhart, Mama's Family, Growing Pains, and on Banacek, co-starring as perpetually puzzled chauffeur Jay Drury.

He went into the 1990s with appearances on NBC-TV's Seinfeld and Friends, CBS-TV's The Nanny, and ABC-TV's Home Improvement. Manza also made appearances in several feature films, perhaps most memorably as the actor playing Hitler in Mel Brooks' 1974 comedy Blazing Saddles ("They lose me after the bunker scene"), and as the fisherman whose scene in the 1998 Godzilla was used as the film's first teaser.

== Death ==
Manza died on January 31, 2000 at Scripps Health-Encintas Hospital in Encinitas, California of a heart attack. He had suffered a heart attack three weeks earlier as well, while filming a commercial for Budweiser.

== Filmography ==
- China Smith (1954, Episode: "The Manchu Emeralds") as Gluck
- Highway Patrol (1955, Episode: "Phony Insurance") as Jenkins
- Alfred Hitchcock Presents (1956) (Season 1 Episode 21: "Safe Conduct") as Waiter
- Front Row Center (1956, Episode: "The Human Touch") as Second Waiter
- While the City Sleeps (1956) as Newsroom Man (uncredited)
- Judge Roy Bean (1956, Episode: "Citizen Romeo") as Gaspano Martini
- The Lineup (1957, Episode: "The Juke Box Bandit Case") as Lineup Suspect #2
- Hey, Jeannie! (1956–1957, TV Series) as 1st Cabbie / Harry
- The Enemy Below (1957) as Lieutenant Bonelli (uncredited)
- Gang War (1958) as Bernard "Axe" Duncan
- The Hunters (1958) as Major Gifford (Uncredited)
- I Married a Monster from Outer Space (1958) as Waiter (Uncredited)
- Dragnet (1958–1959, TV Series) as Guest Star
- The D.A.'s Man (1959, TV Series) as Al Bonacorsi
- Lock-Up (1959, Episode: "Death in the Streets") as Cappy
- The Rise and Fall of Legs Diamond (1960) as Bookmaker (Uncredited)
- Too Soon to Love (1960) as Hughie Wineman
- Sugarfoot (1960, Episode: "Return to Boot Hill") as Glen Hause
- Outlaws (1961, Episode: "The Little Colonel") as Colonel
- Secret of Deep Harbor (1961) as Frank Miner
- Straightaway (1961, Episode: "The Bribe") as Eddie
- Target: The Corruptors! (1961, Episode: "Quicksand") as Guest Star
- 87th Precinct (1961–1962, TV Series) as Cabbie
- Surfside 6 (1961–1962, TV Series) as Delcastro / Martinelli
- 77 Sunset Strip (1961–1963, TV Series) as Dietz / Patsy Coniglio
- Perry Mason (1961–1964, TV Series) as Yard Man / Amos Elwell / Dr. Lieberson / Dr. Prince
- Ben Casey (1962, Episode: "To A Grand and Natural Finale") as Pino
- The Twilight Zone (1962, Episode: "The Dummy") as Doorman
- That Touch of Mink (1962) as Cab Driver (uncredited)
- The Third Man (1962, Episode: "The Cross of Candos") as Ardo
- Going My Way (1962, Episode: "The Crooked Angel") as Charlie
- The Dick Powell Show (1962, Episode: "The Sea Witch") as Emile
- The Gallant Men (1962, Episode: "Some Tears Fall Dry") as Cafe Proprietor
- This Is Not a Test (1962) as Looter
- The Untouchables (1962–1963, TV Series) as Max Templar / Jerry
- Alcoa Premiere (1963, Episode: "Lollipop Louie") as Uncle Peter
- General Hospital (1963–1965, TV Series) as Mike Costello
- The Wide Country (1963, Episode: "Yanqui, Go Home!") as Lupo
- The Virginian (1963–1964, TV Series) as Harry the Barber
- Kisses for My President (1964) as Rizzutti - Mechanic (uncredited)
- Dear Heart (1964) as Restaurant Proprietor
- McHale's Navy (1965–1966, TV Series) as Angelo Barone / The Gypsy
- Laredo (1965–1967, TV Series) as Blue Dog
- Batman (1966, TV Series) as Felix
- Honey West (1966, Episode: "Slay, Gypsy, Slay") as Putzi
- Gomer Pyle - U.S.M.C. (1966, Episode: "Gomer, the Would-Be Hero") as Sam
- What Did You Do in the War, Daddy? (1966) as Waiter
- Dragnet (1967, Episode: "The Big Explosion") as Gene Ellis
- The Ride to Hangman's Tree (1967) as Prisoner (uncredited)
- He & She (1967, Episode: "The Coming-Out Party") as Mr. Banaducci
- Petticoat Junction (1967, Episode: "Kate's Day in Court") as Pierre
- Get Smart (1967–1970, TV Series) as Rico / Finster / Mr. Antonelli / Cart Driver
- Gunsmoke (1968, Episode: "Deadman's Law") as Marco;
- Three Guns for Texas (1968) as Blue Dog
- Family Affair (1968, TV Series) as Waiter / Clerk
- The Smugglers (1968, TV Movie) as Batisto
- The Outsider (1968, Episode: "There Was a Little Girl") as Charley
- Dragnet 1966 (1969, TV Movie) as Eddie Garcia (Uncredited)
- Adam-12 (1969–1971, TV Series) as Zizi Martino / Market Proprietor / Frank Standish
- To Rome with Love (1969–1971, TV Series) as Paoli / Giotto
- The Bold Ones: The Lawyers (1969, Episode: "Shriek of Silence") as Wilfred Fletcher
- The High Chaparral (1970, Episode: "Only the Bad Come to Sonora") as Gomez
- Insight (1970, Episode: "The Day God Died") as Thomas
- Ironside (1970–1971, TV Series) as Al and Emilio
- The Love Machine (1971) as Bartender (Uncredited)
- My Three Sons (1971, Episode: "Four for the Road") as Cab Driver
- Night Gallery (1972, Episode: "The Ring with the Red Velvet Ropes") as Max
- Banacek (1972–1974, TV Series) as Jay Drury
- The Odd Couple (1973, Episode: "Myrna's Debut") as Tony Mugucci
- Cops and Robbers (1973) as Cop #6
- Blazing Saddles (1974) as Man Playing Hitler (uncredited)
- Police Woman (1975, Episode: "Target Black") as Lombardi
- A Cry for Help (1975, TV Movie) as Tony Garafolas
- The Wild Party (1975) as Fruit Dealer
- Chico and the Man (1975–1977, TV Series) as Hector Gomez
- Spencer's Pilots (1976, Episode: "The Prisoner") as Man in Camper
- Serpico (1976, TV Series) as Monsignor Rossi / Stefano
- The Practice (1976, Episode: "Jules Takes a Partner") as Herman
- Terraces (1977, TV Movie) as Nick Parisi
- Fish (1977, TV Series) as Jackman
- Barney Miller (1977–1982, TV Series) as Leon Roth / Eddie Blake / Anthony Barelli
- A.E.S. Hudson Street (1978, TV Series) as Ambulance Aide Stanke
- The One and Only (1978) as Bellman
- Perfect Gentlemen (1978, TV Movie) as Frankie Fox
- The Cat from Outer Space (1978) as Weasel
- Love at First Bite (1979) as Limo Driver
- Big Shamus, Little Shamus (1979, TV Series) as Lou (Unaired)
- Samurai (1979, TV Movie) as Irving Berman
- The Apple Dumpling Gang Rides Again (1979) as Little Guy
- Benson (1980, Episode: "Takin' It to the Streets") as Crazy
- Fatso (1980) as Danny
- Little Miss Marker (1980) as Casino Worker
- Nero Wolfe (1981, Episode: "Might as Well be Dead")
- WKRP in Cincinnati (1981, Episode: "Clean Up Radio Everywhere") as Harvey Green
- Soap (1981, TV Series) as Digger
- Hill Street Blues (1981, Episode: "Fruits of the Poisonous Tree") as Morris Wine
- Simon & Simon (1981, Episode: "A Recipe for Disaster") as Hotel Manager
- One Day at a Time (1981–1982, TV Series) as The Bellhop / Guard
- CHiPs (1982–1983, TV Series) as Cooper / Hot Dog Vendor
- Little House on the Prairie (1983, Episode: "Once Upon a Time") as Hugo
- Fantasy Island (1983, Episode: "Revenge of the Forgotten") as Chef Henri
- Amanda's (1983, Episode: "I Ain't Got Nobody") as Mr. Ahern
- The Facts of Life (1983, Episode: "Help from Home") as Mr. Balducci
- The Fall Guy (1983, Episode: "The Chameleon")
- Hart to Hart (1983, Episode: "Too Close to Hart") as Leo
- Zorro and Son (1983, Episode: "The Butcher of Barcelona") as Waiter
- Blue Thunder (1984, Episode: "Trojan Horse") as Willie
- Mama Malone (1984, TV Series) as Padre Guardiano
- The Philadelphia Experiment (1984) as Older Jim
- Cover Up (1984, Episode: "Death in Vogue") as Sergi
- Night Court (1984–1992, TV Series) as Angelo / Subway Commuter / Jerome Chapel
- Scarecrow and Mrs. King (1985, Episode: "A Little Sex, a Little Scandal") as Flower Shop Owner
- Beer (1985) as Frankie's Grandfather
- The Golden Girls (1985, Episode: "The Competition") as Augustine Bagatelli
- Crazy Like a Fox (1985–1986, TV Series)
- Newhart (1985–1990, TV Series) as Bud
- The Twilight Zone (1986, Episode: ""Cold Reading"") as Sol (segment "Cold Reading")
- Mama's Family (1986, Episode: "Where There's a Will") as Larwin P. Finstadtler
- Highway to Heaven (1986, Episode: "Basinger's New York") as Charley Carthy
- Retribution (1987) as Amos
- Matlock (1987, Episode: "The Doctors") as Mr. Lipman
- Beauty and the Beast (1987, Episode: "Siege") as Old Man #1
- Knots Landing (1987, Episode: "Noises Everywhere Pt. 1") as Bereaved Man
- Growing Pains (1988, Episode: "The Mom Who Knew Too Much") as Izzy
- Punky Brewster (1988, Episode: "Christmas Hero") as Santa Claus
- Hooperman (1989, Episode: "Rashomanny") as Manny
- Have Faith (1989, Episode: "The Competition")
- Nearly Departed (1989, Episode: "Grandpa's Date") as Ralph
- Santa Barbara (1989–1992, TV Series) as Father Sierras
- Anything But Love (1990, Episode: "Three Men On a Match")
- Doogie Howser, M.D. (1990, Episode: "Whose Mid-Life Crisis Is It Anyway") as Charlie Wilson
- Murder, She Wrote (1990, Episode: "The Sicilian Encounter") as Father Anselmo
- The Fanelli Boys (1990, Episode: "Pilot") as Sicilian #2
- 9 1/2 Ninjas! (1991) as Old Man
- Who's the Boss? (1991, Episode: "The Road to Washington Pt. 1") as Francis
- The Fresh Prince of Bel-Air (1991, Episode: "The Butler Did It") as Bob Doomie
- Get a Life (1991, Episode: "Chris Becomes a Male Escort") as Henry Gardner
- Sisters (1992, Episode: "The Bottom Line") as Saul
- Mission of Justice (1992) as Mr. Lazar
- Dave (1993) as White House Barber
- Seinfeld (1993, Episode: "The Cigar Store Indian") as Gepetto
- Lookin' Italian (1994) as Manza
- The John Larroquette Show (1994, Episode: "Grit") as Rudy
- The Nanny (1994, Episode: "Everybody Needs a Bubby") as Saul Kanasal
- Silk Stalkings (1994, Episode: "Reluctant Witness") as Gussie DiBarto (Uncredited)
- Madman of the People (1995, Episode: "Truths My Father Told") as Street Person
- Home Improvement (1995, Episode: "A House Divided") as Sam
- Northern Exposure (1995, Episode: "Little Italy") as Cesare Trapani
- Get Shorty (1995) as Fred the Barber
- Mad About You (1995–1996, TV Series) as Saul Campanella
- Sister, Sister (1995–1996, TV Series) as Floyd and Frail Man
- Tracey Takes On... (1996, Episode: "Law") as Old Juror
- Her Last Chance (1996, TV Movie) as Pawnbroker
- The Home Court (1996, Episode: "Love, Death, & Soda") as Thin Man
- Dave's World (1996, Episode: "L.A. Times") as Mervyn
- Hollywood Boulevard (1996) as Janitor
- Living Single (1997, Episode: "He's The One") as Old Man #1
- Alright Already (1997, Episode: "Again with the Jessica's Boyfriend") as Superfly
- Grace Under Fire (1997, Episode: "Vega$") as Condo Resident
- Godzilla (1998) as Joe
- Charmed (1998, Episode: "I've Got You Under My Skin") as Elderly Man
- Viper (1998, Episode: "Family Matters") as Anton Pollard
- Friends (1999, Episode: "The One With Rachel's Inadvertent Kiss") as The Old Man
- Can't Be Heaven (1999) as Anzio
- What's Cooking (2000) as Uncle David
- Boy Meets World (2000, Episode: "I'm Gonna Be Like You, Dad") as Uncle Morrie
- The Tangerine Bear (2000) as Factory Worker / Rico (voice) (final film role)
