= James McEachin =

American actor, author and veteran (1930–2025)

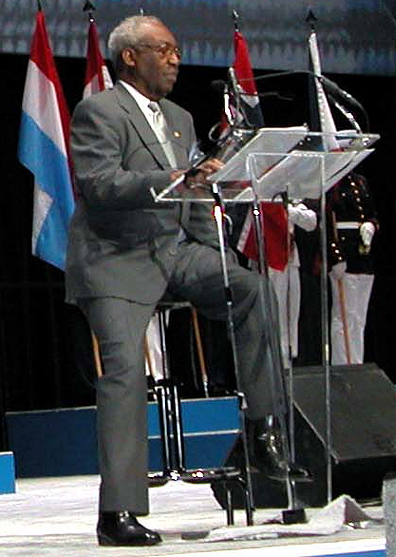
- McEachin reads a narrative on the conflict at a Department of Defense salute to the Korean War in 2003.
- Born: May 20, 1930; Rennert, North Carolina, U.S.
- Died: January 11, 2025 (aged 94); Los Angeles, California, U.S.
- Occupation: Actor
- Years active: 1966–2007
- Spouse: Lois Emma Davis McEachin (m. 1960; died 2017)
- Children: 3

James McEachin (May 20, 1930 – January 11, 2025) was an American actor, author and veteran of the Korean War. He appeared in various films and television shows.

== Early life and military career ==
James McEachin was born in Rennert, North Carolina on May 20, 1930.

McEachin served in the United States Army before, and then during, the Korean War. Serving in King Company, 9th Infantry Regiment (United States), 2nd Infantry Division, he was wounded (nearly fatally) in an ambush and nearly left for dead. McEachin was one of only two soldiers to survive the ambush. He was a recipient of the Silver Star, the Purple Heart and was entitled to wear the Combat Infantryman Badge.

== Civilian career ==
Following his military career, McEachin dabbled in civil service, first as a fireman and then a policeman in Hackensack, New Jersey, before he moved to California and became a record producer. Known as Jimmy Mack in the industry, he worked with young artists such as Otis Redding and went on to produce The Furys. He began his acting career shortly after, and was signed by Universal as a contract actor in the 1960s.

He was regularly cast in professional, "solid citizen" occupational roles, such as a lawyer or a police commander, guesting on numerous series such as Hawaii Five-O, The Rockford Files, Mannix, The Feather and Father Gang, The Eddie Capra Mysteries, Matlock, Jake and the Fatman, Diagnosis Murder, Dragnet, It Takes a Thief, and Adam-12, and in television movies including Welcome Home, Johnny Bristol (1972); The Alpha Caper (1973) and The Dead Don't Die (1975). He appeared in such feature films as Uptight (1968); If He Hollers, Let Him Go! (1968); The Undefeated (1969); The Lawyer (1970); Buck and the Preacher (1972); The Groundstar Conspiracy (1972) and Fuzz (1972).

McEachin played Mr. Turner, a tax collector for the Internal Revenue Service, and later a character named Solomon Jackson, a co-worker that Archie Bunker tries to recruit for his social club, on the television show All in the Family. He played the deejay Sweet Al Monte in Play Misty for Me (1971) with Clint Eastwood. In 1973, he starred as Harry Tenafly, the title character in Tenafly, a short-lived detective series about a police officer turned private detective who relied on his wits and hard work rather than guns and fistfights. As the star of that show, he was (along with Susan Saint James of McMillan and Wife) one of the last surviving actors to have starred as a title character from a series featured on the 1970s' NBC Mystery Movie. McEachin also appeared occasionally as Lieutenant Ron Crockett on Emergency!. In 1978, he played a police officer in Every Which Way but Loose. In 1979, he played the role of a jaded ex-marine high school baseball coach in an episode ("Out at Home") of The White Shadow.

He made his fourth film with Eastwood in 1983 when he starred as Detective Barnes in the fourth Dirty Harry movie, Sudden Impact. He also appeared as Dr. Victor Millson, chairman of the fictitious National Council of Astronautics in the 1984 movie 2010. In addition to his appearing in a role with Roy Scheider, his character often appears in video in dispatches transmitted to the American astronauts in the film.

While continuing to guest star in many television series and appearing in several feature-length films, McEachin landed his most memorable role, that of Police Lieutenant Brock in the 1986 television movie Perry Mason: The Case of the Notorious Nun. He would reprise this role in more than a dozen Perry Mason telemovies from 1986 until 1995, starring opposite Raymond Burr. He appeared in the 1994 crime thriller Double Exposure.

In the 1990s, he semi-retired from acting to pursue a writing career. His first work was a military history of the court-martial of 63 black American soldiers during the First World War, titled Farewell to the Mockingbirds (1995). It won the 1998 Benjamin Franklin Award.

His next works, mainly novels, included The Heroin Factor (1999), Say Goodnight to the Boys in Blue (2000), The Great Canis Lupus (2001), and Tell Me a Tale: A Novel of the Old South (2003). He published Pebbles in the Roadway in 2003, a collection of short stories and essays which he describes as "a philosophical view of America and Americans".

In 2005, McEachin produced the award-winning audio book Voices: A Tribute to the American Veteran.

In early 2006, McEachin starred with David Huddleston in Reveille, a short film that played to troops in Afghanistan and Iraq. Many people requested copies of the film. The film was posted on video.google.com and quickly garnered 1.5 million hits and a deluge of fan mail to the jamesmceachin.com website.

McEachin was inspired to create, direct, produce, and star in the short Old Glory. It won Best Narrative Short at the 2007 GI Film Festival. Old Glory was McEachin's directorial debut.

In 2001, McEachin received the Distinguished Achievement Award from Morgan State University. In 2005, he became an Army Reserve Ambassador; this distinction carries the protocol of a two-star general. As part of his work on behalf of the military and veterans, McEachin has participated in ceremonies for Purple Hearts Reunited, a charitable organization that works to return lost and stolen military awards to the recipients or their families.

== Personal life and death ==
McEachin married the former Lois Emma Davis in 1960. Their three grown children are Alainia, Lyle, and Felecia. The second daughter was personal assistant to, among others, Ice Cube and (the late) Emmy Award-winning director, producer and writer Sam Simon. She is currently owner of The Assistant Company. Lois McEachin died in 2017, in Encino, California.

The pronunciation of "McEachin", as he used it in a public service ad for the Army Relief Agency, rhymes with "beach in".

McEachin died on January 11, 2025, in Los Angeles, at the age of 94.

== Awards ==
In 2005 he was awarded both the Purple Heart and Silver Star by California Congressman David Dreier after McEachin participated in a Veterans History Project interview for his office. When Dreier's aide, Carlos Cortez, learned McEachin had no copies of his military records, he quickly had the records traced and notified McEachin of the Silver Star commendation. Dreier awarded McEachin all seven of his medals of valor and military service shortly thereafter, fifty years after his service.

== Filmography ==
- 1966: The Black Klansman as Lonnie
- 1968: Where Were You When the Lights Went Out? as Policeman (uncredited)
- 1968: The Legend of Lylah Clare as Reporter (uncredited)
- 1968: Coogan's Bluff as Man (uncredited)
- 1968: If He Hollers, Let Him Go! as Defense Counsel
- 1968: Uptight as Mello
- 1968: Adam-12 S1Ep10 as Officer Wood
- 1968: Hawaii Five-O as Captain John Anderson
- 1969: True Grit as Judge Parker's Bailiff (uncredited)
- 1969: The Undefeated as Jimmy Collins
- 1969: Hello, Dolly! as Laborer (uncredited)
- 1970: The Lawyer as Striker
- 1970: Dragnet Season 12 episode 13 as Officer Tim
- 1971: Play Misty for Me as Al Monte
- 1971: Adam-12 S4Ep17 as Lt. Moore
- 1972: Short Walk To Daylight as Ed Mullins
- 1972: Buck and the Preacher as Kingston
- 1972: The Groundstar Conspiracy as Lt. Moore
- 1972: Fuzz as Det. Arthur Brown
- 1972: Columbo "Etude in Black" S2Ep2 as Billy Jones
- 1972: The Judge and Jake Wyler as Quint
- 1972: All in the Family "Archie's Fraud" S3Ep2 as Mr. Turner
- 1973: Emergency! S2Ep21 as Construction Worker Milt
- 1974: Christina as Donovan
- 1974: Emergency! S4Ep5 as Police Detective Lt. Crockett
- 1975: Emergency! S5Ep9 as Police Detective Lt. Crockett
- 1977: Emergency! S6Ep24 as a musician.
- 1978: Every Which Way but Loose as Herb
- 1978: Columbo "Make Me a Perfect Murder" S7E3 as Projectionist Walter Mearhead
- 1978: The Eddie Capra Mysteries "The Two Million Dollar Stowaway" as Sam Tully
- 1980: The White Shadow S2Ep19 as baseball coach Jake Owens
- 1983: Sudden Impact as Detective Barnes
- 1984: 2010 as Victor Milson
- 1986-95 Matlock as Police Lt. Frank Daniels (8 episodes)
- 1987: Hunter S4EP12
- 1994: Double Exposure as Detective Becker
