= Reg Cooper =

British singer

Reg Cooper (c. 1920s – 24 March 2009) was a British country music singer and songwriter.

== Early life ==
Cooper was born with cataracts and was raised in an orphanage. He later started a shop and then worked in a home for the blind, where he got inclined towards his passion of music.

Cooper was the father of the author, Sheila Hocken.

== Career ==
He played in folk clubs in Nottingham area for four decades after that he won a contract through dance label Cleveland City. One of his song was recorded by John Denver, Catch Another Butterfly in late 1960s. His other song was recorded by Hank Snow but Cooper said that he didn't receive any financial compensation for his work.

From 1969 to the early 1980s he hosted a country show on BBC Radio Nottingham

In 2000, at the age of 73 he signed a £300,000 recording contract with an independent label.
