= Barry Newman =

American actor (1930–2023)

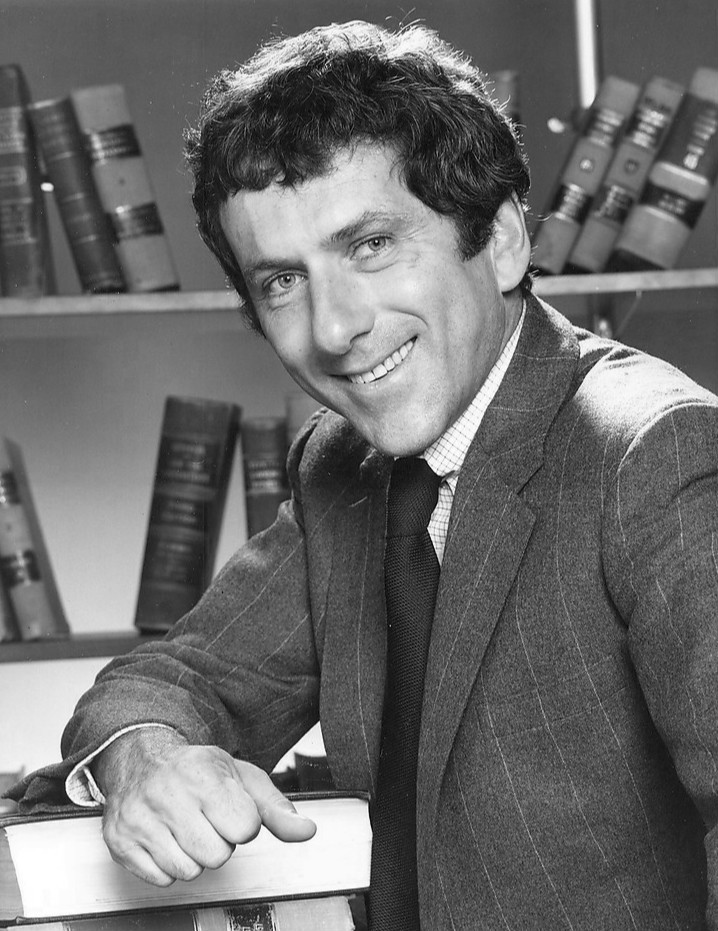
- Newman in 1974
- Born: Barry Foster Newman; November 7, 1930; Boston, Massachusetts, U.S.
- Died: May 11, 2023 (aged 92); New York City, U.S.
- Occupation: Actor
- Years active: 1960–2022
- Spouses: Angela G. Newman (m. 1994; div. 2007) (m. 2018)

Barry Foster Newman (November 7, 1930 – May 11, 2023) was an American actor of stage, screen, and television known for his portrayal of Kowalski in Vanishing Point, and for his title role in the 1970s television series Petrocelli. He was nominated for Golden Globe and Emmy awards.

== Early life ==
Newman was born in Boston, Massachusetts, on November 7, 1930, although he gave his year of birth as 1938, the son of a Belarusian-Jewish-born mother, Sarah (née Ostrovsky), and an Austrian-Jewish father, Carl Newman. Newman graduated from the prestigious Boston Latin School in 1948. He was a childhood friend of actor Leonard Nimoy.

After graduating from Brandeis University with a degree in anthropology in 1952, Newman was drafted into the Army, and having learned saxophone and clarinet in high school, he was assigned to the 3rd Army Band in Atlanta. After being discharged, Newman went to New York to receive his master's degree in anthropology from Columbia University. After sitting in on a class taught by Lee Strasberg, Newman decided to leave Columbia and become an actor.

== Career ==
Newman's first acting job was in Herman Wouk's first comedy Nature's Way, in which he played a jazz musician. New York critic Richard Watts called him "The creme of the Jesters". This role was followed by a featured part in the play Maybe Tuesday, written by Mel Tolkin.

Newman starred in the New York production of Agatha Christie's The Mousetrap. After numerous parts on Broadway, including the musical What Makes Sammy Run, Sidney Kingsley's Night Live, America Hurrah,, Newman went on to do TV and movies. While working at nights on Broadway in What Makes Sammy Run, Newman starred as attorney John Barnes in the daytime drama The Edge of Night for two years. Earlier, Newman co-starred in his first film, the gangster potboiler Pretty Boy Floyd (1960), and he made his breakthrough with his first starring role in The Lawyer (1970).

Newman is perhaps best known for his starring role as Kowalski in the 1971 cult film, Vanishing Point, about an existential journey across the western United States by a car transport driver delivering a white Dodge Challenger from Denver, Colorado to San Francisco, California. Vanishing Point was followed by starring roles in 20th Century Fox's Salzburg Connection and Paramount's Fear Is the Key. In 1974, Petrocelli, a TV series created around the character Newman first played in The Lawyer, debuted on NBC and ran two seasons.

After Petrocelli, Newman starred in the film City on Fire with Henry Fonda and Ava Gardner, then in Disney's Amy. He starred or co-starred in more than 20 TV movies of the week, including ABC's King Crab, which won the ABC Theater Award. He also co-starred in several miniseries, including Fatal Vision. Variety called Newman "The Spencer Tracy of the 80s".

In 1989, Newman starred with Suzanne Pleshette in the television series Nightingales. In the early 1990s, Newman starred in the BBC's production of The Mirror Cracked. During the 1990s, Newman co-starred in Daylight, Bowfinger, and The Limey.

Newman's success with the TV movie Night Games, based on the 1970 movie The Lawyer, led to the TV series Petrocelli, starring Newman as a lawyer who lives and works in the fictional town of San Remo, Arizona (filmed in Tucson, Arizona). He was nominated for an Emmy in 1975 for Outstanding Lead Actor in a Drama Series, and in 1976, for a Golden Globe.

== Personal life and death ==
Newman was married to Angela G. Newman from 1994 to 2007, and again from 2018 until his death. He was a resident of Midtown Manhattan.

Newman died at Columbia University Irving Medical Center on May 11, 2023, at the age of 92. According to The New York Times, during treatment for back pain, he contracted a lung infection that spread to his spine and heart. In addition to his wife, his survivors included several nephews and a niece, journalist and author Judith Newman.

== Awards and nominations ==
- 1975, Petrocelli, Emmy for Best Actor, nominated
- 1976, Petrocelli, Golden Globe for Best Actor in a Drama Series, nominated

== Selected filmography ==
- Pretty Boy Floyd (1960) ... Al Riccardo
- The Moving Finger (1963) ... Mason
- The Lawyer (1970) ... Tony Petrocelli
- Vanishing Point (1971) ... Kowalski
- Fear Is the Key (1972) ... John Talbot
- The Salzburg Connection (1972) ... Bill Mathison
- City on Fire (1979) ... Dr. Frank Whitman
- Amy (1981) ... Dr. Ben Corcoran
- Having It All (1982) ... Peter Baylin
- Deadline (1982) ... Barney Duncan
- Fantasies (1982) ... Detective Flynn
- Second Sight: A Love Story (1984) ... Richard Chapman
- My Two Loves (1986) ... Ben
- Daylight (1996) ... Norman Bassett
- Brown's Requiem (1998) ... Jack Skolnick
- Goodbye Lover (1998) ... Sen. Lassetter
- The Limey (1999) ... Jim Avery
- Bowfinger (1999)... Hal Mclean
- Fugitive Mind (1999) ... Dr. Chamberlain
- G-Men From Hell (2000)... Greydon Lake
- Jack the Dog (2001)... Simon
- True Blue (2001) ... Monty
- Good Advice (2001) ... Donald Simpson
- 40 Days and 40 Nights (2002) ... Walter Sullivan
- Manhood (2003) ... Simon
- What the Bleep Do We Know!? (2004) ... Frank
- Grilled (2006) ... Boris

== Selected television work ==
- The Edge of Night (1964–1965) ... John Barnes
- Way Out (1961) ... Officer Police (1 episode, "Hush-Hush")
- The Defenders (1961) Season 1 Episode 14 " The Prowler " The Reporter ( 1 Episode, December 16,1991 )
- Armstrong Circle Theatre (1963) ... (1 episode, 1963)
- Naked City (1963) "Beyond This Place There Be Dragons" ... Cabbie
- Get Smart (1968) ... Season 3 Episode 15 " The Groovy Guru " Assistant Guru (1 episode, January 13,1968)
- The Tonight Show Starring Johnny Carson ... Himself (3 episodes, 1973–1975)
- Petrocelli (1974) ... Anthony J. Petrocelli (45 episodes, 1974–1976)
- Dinah! (1975) ... (Cast Member 1975–1977)
- Quincy M.E. (1976) ... Season 8 Episode 24 " The Cutting Edge " Dr. Gabe McCracken (1 episode, May 11,1983)
- The Fall Guy (1984) Season 4 ep. 6 " Private Eyes " ... Himself
- Fatal Vision (miniseries) (1984) ... Bernie Segal
- Nightingales (1989) ... Dr. Garrett Braden (13 episodes, 1989)
- Murder She Wrote
  - (1988) Season 5 ep. 4 Snow White, Blood Red ... Ed McMasters
  - (1989) Season 6 ep. 10 Class Act ... Lt. Amos 'Jake' Ballinger
  - (1995) Season 11 ep. 21 Game, Set, Murder ... Andrew Bascombe
- The New Hollywood Squares (1989) .... Special Guest (1 episode, 1989)
- Miss Marple (1992) Ep. 12 The Mirror Crack'd from Side to Side ... Jason Rudd
- L.A. Law (1994) ... Frank Askoff (2 episodes, 1994)
- NYPD Blue ... Jimmy Wexler (2 episodes, 1994–1998)
- The O.C. (2005) ... Professor Max Bloom (3 episodes, 2005)
- The Cleaner (2009) ep. "Hello America" ... Marcus O'Hara
- Ghost Whisperer (2009)... Ray James (1 episode "Till Death Do Us Start")
