= The Frozen Dead =

1966 British film by Herbert J. Leder

- 1967 U.S. theatrical release poster
- Directed by: Herbert J. Leder
- Written by: Herbert J. Leder
- Produced by: Herbert J. Leder
- Starring: Dana Andrews; Anna Palk; Philip Gilbert
- Cinematography: Davis Boulton
- Music by: Don Banks
- Production companies: Gold Star Productions; Seven Arts
- Distributed by: Warner-Pathé Distributors (U.K.); Warner Bros.-Seven Arts (U.S.)
- Release dates: 23 July 1967 (UK); 15 November 1967 (US)
- Running time: 95 minutes
- Country: United Kingdom
- Language: English

The Frozen Dead is a 1966 British science fiction horror film written, produced and directed by Herbert J. Leder and starring Dana Andrews, Anna Palk and Philip Gilbert.

Nazi scientist Dr. Norberg attempts to revive a number of frozen Nazi soldiers at his English estate so that the Third Reich can arise anew 20 years after the end of World War II.

The film was released in both the UK and US as a double-feature with It!, also written, produced and directed by Leder.

== Plot ==
For 20 years, unrepentant Nazi scientist Dr. Norberg has been experimentally thawing frozen Nazi soldiers who have been kept in suspended animation at his English country estate since the end of World War II. He is awaiting his superiors, General Lubeck and Captain Tirptiz, who have been told by Norberg's assistant, Karl that Norberg's experiments have been a complete success. Unfortunately, they have not been. Norberg can thaw the body, but not the brain. All that he can produce are zombie-like beings who can do no more than endlessly repeat the memory of just one action from their past. The worst of them, Prisoner no. 3, is extremely violent, and is Norberg's brother.

Lubeck tells Norberg that 1,500 frozen Nazis have been stashed in several countries. In order to revive the Third Reich, Lubeck exclaims that they are 'to be restored to full capacity at the right time - which is now!' To help do this, Norberg brings in American scientist Ted Roberts, who has had some success in thawing functional brains. Ted, unaware of the Nazi plot, believes that he is to help Norberg keep organs alive for medical use.

Norberg's niece, Jean arrives home unexpectedly from a university in America, bringing along her friend Elsa. On the day after, Jean is told that Elsa left on the 6:00 AM train to London. Jean does not understand her sudden departure.

Norberg tells Ted that he plans to experiment on an ape’s head, keeping it alive, with a clear plastic dome over its cranium so that he can observe its brain function, then transfer what he learns to humans. Ted readily agrees to help. But then Norberg unexpectedly has the opportunity to use a human head, for Karl had drugged Elsa and taken her to the laboratory, not the train station. Norberg and Karl find Elsa dead in the lab, with Prisoner no. 3 standing over her body, smiling.

Norberg later impresses Ted with a wall of amputated human arms, which he can control through electrical stimulation. After Ted agrees to tell no one of what he is about to see, Norberg trustingly shows him Elsa's head, alive, its skin a horrid blue colour and its brain covered by a clear plastic dome.

That night, Jean has a nightmare. She tells Ted that she has dreamed that Elsa is dead and that her head is in the laboratory. To keep from further upsetting her, Ted dismisses it as just a bad dream. In truth, Elsa is communicating telepathically with Jean as she sleeps. Not knowing this, Jean persists in trying to find her friend, consulting railway station personnel and a Mrs. Smith (Ann Tirard), who may know something about Elsa's whereabouts. Mrs. Smith denies any knowledge of Elsa, but she is, in reality, Mrs. Schmidt, another Nazi living undercover in England. Jean does not discover this and asks Police Inspector Witt (Tom Chatto) to investigate.

After seeing Elsa's head, Ted wonders about Norberg's real intent. As he walks toward the lab, Karl knocks him unconscious. When he comes to, Norberg tells him that he was attacked by Norberg's brother, whom Norberg describes as having been 'mentally ill' since the war. He asks Ted not to tell Jean, as no. 3 is her father and she has believed since childhood that he died in a concentration camp, not a Nazi but a victim of the Nazis.

Lubeck and Tirptiz torture Karl to find out if he has told anyone about their plot. He confesses that he has told the Schmidts, who are members of his own family. After Karl tries to prove his loyalty to the Nazis by attempting to murder Jean and Ted, Lubeck forces Norberg to freeze Karl as punishment.

Norberg tries to demonstrate to Lubeck and Tirpitz that Elsa can control the wall of arms, but nothing happens. Ted suggests that Elsa still has will power. Norberg scoffs at the notion. Lubeck and Tirpitz, by now afraid that Jean will find out about the plot, discuss killing Jean as Elsa listens.

That night, Elsa again communicates telepathically with Jean, who, in a trance, heads for the lab. Ted rouses her at the locked door. Jean is certain that Elsa is inside and convinces Ted that Elsa needs their help. Ted tells Jean that no. 3 is actually her father. She sends Ted to get Witt, then steals the key to the lab and finds Elsa. Norberg confirms that no. 3 is Jean's father, but when he says that no. 3 killed Elsa, Elsa tells Jean that Karl killed her.

Lubeck reveals the Nazi plot to Jean. When he draws a pistol to shoot her, he and Norberg struggle over it in front of the wall of arms. Elsa activates the arms, which strangle them both. Meanwhile, Jean runs to see her father. Tirpitz appears just in time and shoots Prisoner no. 3 dead as he is strangling her.

Finally, with Jean, Ted and Witt looking on, Elsa pitifully whimpers 'Bury me' over and over again.

== Cast ==
- Dana Andrews as Dr. Norberg
- Anna Palk as Jean Norberg
- Philip Gilbert as Dr. Roberts
- Kathleen Breck as Elsa Tenney
- Karel Stepanek as General Lubeck
- Basil Henson as Dr. Tirpitz
- Alan Tilvern as Karl Essen
- Ann Tirard as Mrs. Schmidt
- Edward Fox as Prisoner No.3
- Oliver MacGreevy as Joseph [butler]
- Tom Chatto as Inspector Witt
- John Moore as stationmaster [Bailey]
- Charles Wade as porter [Harvey]

== Production ==
The movie was filmed at Merton Park Studios in London. It was shot in Eastmancolour and shown in colour in theatres in the U.K. and on U.S. television. However, in theatres in the U.S., it was shown in black-and-white, allegedly to 'save money duplicating prints'. The film is a co-production of Gold Star Productions, Ltd. and Seven Arts Productions. Gold Star's only other film was It!, the companion film to The Frozen Dead in both Britain and America.

The Frozen Dead is the first film in which Edward Fox received an on-screen credit, although he had been in three previous films.

== Release ==
The Frozen Dead was rated 'X' by the British Board of Film Censors on 21 October 1966 and released in the UK on 23 July 1967. Its theatrical premiere in the US was in Boston on 27 September 1967 and it went into domestic release on 15 November. Theatrical distribution was handled in the UK by Warner-Pathé Distributors and in the US by Warner Bros.-Seven Arts. It was also released theatrically in West Germany, Italy and Greece, as well as in Belgium and Mexico.

The double-bill American pressbook for The Frozen Dead and It! carried a notice allowing theatre operators to modify the advertisements for the movies by substituting 'thrill' for 'horror' if they so desired. The reason given was that Warner Brothers-Seven Arts believed that in some parts of the country, 'the word "thrill" may have greater box office pull than the word "horror"'.

For individual home viewing in America, The Frozen Dead was released on DVD by Catcom Home Entertainment in 2003 and on DVD and DVD-R in 2013 by Warner Archive.

Segments of The Frozen Dead were featured in the US television programme 100 Years of Horror, in a 1996 episode titled 'Mad Doctors'. The movie's theatrical trailer is included in two American compilation videos of science-fiction and horror movie trailers: Out of This World Super Shock Show, released by Something Weird Video in October 2007, and Grindhouse Universe, released by Ban 1 Productions in January 2008. The film is also 'mentioned' in Vampira and Me, a US video documentary produced by Protagonist and released in 2012.

== Reception ==
According to BoxOffice magazine, the film was rated as "fair" by The New York Daily News and Parents' Magazine, and 'good' by The Hollywood Reporter, Film Daily, Variety and BoxOffice itself. BoxOffice's favourable review of the film called it part of the 'more realistic school of science-fiction', with 'low key suspense and life-like effects'. The anonymous reviewer went on to write that 'Leder's direction is first-rate; his writing sensible and true to the situation. As a result...[Dana] Andrews gives one of his best performances...The rest of the unfamiliar cast is fine, too'.

British critic John Hamilton's look at contemporary reviews notes that the Motion Picture Examiner was of the opinion that the film has 'Some moments of horror and some intrigue but the thin and far-fetched plot is drawn out to a length that makes it unwieldy', and The New York Times wrote of the double bill of The Frozen Dead and It!, 'As horror exercises, they are horrible bores'.

American film critic Bob Herzberg, in The Third Reich on Screen, 1929-2015, quotes additional contemporary reviews which are in the same vein. He writes that John Mahoney of The Hollywood Reporter called the film 'A murky and dank return to the caverns of the Mad Scientist' with 'sufficient gore' for 'the less discriminating multitudes'.

Mandel Herbstman of Film Daily pointed out that 'The excitement at times is high, but so is the credibility gap'. Nonetheless, the movie 'proceeds along formula lines that should create response among the patrons'. The anonymous reviewer in Variety wrote 'In the end, the head cries "Bury me, bury me". Hopefully, this will be the box office response to this project of producer-writer-director' Leder.

Among modern-day critics, American academic film historians Stephanie Boluk and Wylie Lenz point out "the recent trend of mashing up zombies with other literary or cinematic genres. There are numerous films based on genre-crossing gimmicks such as zombies + Nazis" as in The Frozen Dead. But "There is no immediately self-evident reason why so many texts combine Nazis with zombies, aside from the fact that the Third Reich remains a preferred source of evil in American cinema". Boluk and Lenz make reference to Canadian critic Glenn Kay, who writes: 'Why so many zombie films return to this subject remains a mystery'.

But Herzberg sees such mash-ups as diminutions of historical realities. "All in all," he writes, "The Frozen Dead continues the growing Nazi/sci-fi subgenre, artfully reducing Nazi atrocities, as well as their ambitions for world conquest, into comic-book schlock, with decapitated [sic] heads with special telepathic powers and detached arms which kill, though not necessarily for the Führer, but just for the hell of it".

Hamilton finds that while the film 'starts off promisingly enough' with 'blood-curdling screams and the sight of a thug with a whip leading a party of stumbling wretches chained together', it 'quickly careens downwards and goes from quirky to utterly absurd'. For example, he wonders 'what the top [Nazi] brass thought they could achieve with 1,500 storm troopers in the days of nuclear proliferation?' He is, however, complimentary about Kathleen Breck, writing that 'Despite the obvious limitations of playing a head in a box, Breck manages to bring a great deal of sympathy to the role, simply by using her eyes and facial expressions - while [director of photography Willis] Boulton defuses the inherent foolishness of the concept by bathing the scene in an eerie blue glow. The closing moments with Elsa's frantic pleading "Bury me, bury me" – over and over again are genuinely haunting'.

Bryan Senn, an American film critic, also ponders Elsa's head. 'Exactly what [Dr. Norberg] thinks this has to do with defrosting his Stormtrooper-sicles remains rather vague, except that he wants a "living brain" to study'. Senn finds 'this odd British-American co-production' largely uninteresting, writing: 'While a wall covered with arms, a freezer full of Nazis and a head on a table (with ghastly blue makeup and a plastic dome for a skull to expose the grey matter) keeps this film firmly entrenched in the bizarre, endless (and pointless) scenes of talk, talk, talk sink it in a quagmire of apathy'.

British critic Phil Hardy calls the film "an outlandish offering" although "far superior to It!'" and says, "Leder's pedestrian direction cannot remove the delirium of images such as the rack of arms ready for use and Breck's soulful boxed-in head".
