= The Lawyer (film) =

1970 film by Sidney J. Furie

- Directed by: Sidney J. Furie
- Written by: Sidney J. Furie; Harold Buchman
- Produced by: Brad Dexter
- Starring: Barry Newman; Diana Muldaur; Harold Gould
- Cinematography: Ralph Woolsey
- Edited by: Argyle Nelson Jr.
- Music by: Malcolm Dodds
- Production company: Furie Productions
- Distributed by: Paramount Pictures
- Release date: March 10, 1970 (New York City)
- Running time: 120 minutes
- Country: United States
- Language: English
- Budget: $1.8 million

The Lawyer is a 1970 American courtroom drama film loosely based on the Sam Sheppard murder case in which a physician is charged with killing his wife following a highly publicized and sloppy investigation. The film was directed by Sidney J. Furie and stars Barry Newman as the energetic, opportunistic defense attorney Tony Petrocelli and Diana Muldaur as his wife Ruth Petrocelli.

The film is the source of the role that Newman reprised in the television series Petrocelli.

== Plot ==
Tony Petrocelli is a Harvard-educated attorney of Italian heritage who practices in an unidentified part of the American Southwest. He works (and drives) at a frenetic pace, not only because he is a zealous advocate for his defendants (mostly drunks and other small-time criminal cases) but also because of the vast distances of western prairie that he must cross in order to meet clients, investigate his cases and make court appointments.

A major case lands in his lap when he is asked to defend a young, prosperous physician who expects to be charged with the bludgeoning murder of his socialite wife.

== Cast ==
- Barry Newman as Tony Petrocelli (based on F. Lee Bailey)
- Harold Gould as Eric P. Scott
- Diana Muldaur as Ruth Petrocelli
- Robert Colbert as Jack Harrison
- Kathleen Crowley as Alice Fiske
- Warren J. Kemmerling as Sergeant Moran (as Warren Kemmerling)
- Booth Colman as Judge Crawford
- Ken Swofford as Charlie O'Keefe
- E. J. André as F.J. Williamson
- William Sylvester as Paul Harrison
- Jeffery V. Thompson as Andy Greer (as Jeff Thompson)
- Tom Harvey as Bob Chambers
- Ivor Barry as Wyler
- Melendy Britt as Ann Greer
- John Himes as Myro McCauley
- Ralph Thomas as Mike Peterson
- Mary Charlotte Wilcox as Wilma Harrison (as Mary Wilcox)
- Gene O'Donnell as Judge Swackhammer
- Walter Mathews as Mr. Andre
- Ray Ballard as Mr. Canon
- James McEachin as Striker
- Robert L. Poyner as J.C. Hornby
- Michael Murphy as Intern in Legal Office (uncredited)

== Production ==
The film was announced in 1966 and was inspired by the true life case of neurosurgeon Sam Sheppard, whose conviction for the murder of his pregnant wife was overturned by the U.S. Supreme Court and who was acquitted in a 1966 retrial. Sheppard's lawyer, F. Lee Bailey, sold the rights to Sheppard's book Endure and Conquer: My 12 Year Fight for Vindication to 20th Century Fox per an arrangement in which he'd forego direct payment from Sheppard for legal representation and reportedly received between $100,000 and $150,000. In addition to Sheppard's own book, Fox also purchased the rights to two books covering the case by reporter Paul Holmes as well as the book My Brother's Keeper written by Sheppard's brother Steven. Producers Norman Baer and Philip D'Antoni had initially optioned the rights to the story, but after the option expired Paramount Pictures acquired the rights.

Sidney J. Furie became attached to direct having turned down the opportunity to direct M*A*S*H after finding the script to be too much of a mess. An early version of the film would've framed the film in a "quasi-documentary" style, including the unconventional approach of having Bailey play himself, but the approach was abandoned due to a lack of interest from the studio and Bailey left the film. Barry Newman, who played the Bailey-inspired character, was unaware of this initial approach and openly admitted that he made the performance his own rather than a facsimile of Bailey. Norman Bogner initially collaborated with Furie on the script, but after Furie deemed their months of effort "uncinematic" Bogner left the project. fledgling producer Harry Korshak, youngest son of Paramount fixer Sidney Korshak, had befriended Furie leading to Korshak's father-in-law, blacklisted writer Harold Buchman, coming on board to re-write the script. In order to capture Bailey's mannerisms Furie, Buchman, and producer Brad Dexter followed Bailey on other cases in order to document his "performative" style in the courtroom, this prompted the crew to shift focus from the central murder to more on the character of the lawyer which was reflected with the title change where the original title The Sheppard Murder Case was instead replaced with The Lawyer. Despite being unknown at the time, Furie cast Barry Newman as the lead as he'd impressed him in the audition in a way no other had.

== Release ==
The Lawyer had initially been intended for a 1969 release, but as Paramount was suffering financial difficulties and on the brink of bankruptcy the release was delayed. The Lawyer eventually opened in New York on March 10, 1970, followed by a wide release on May 15 of that year.

=== Home media ===
KINO-LORBER issued "The Lawyer" on Blu-ray for its first-ever homevideo release in August 2024 via Kino's deal with Paramount. As stated on the sleeve art: The disc used a 2021 HD Master from a 4k Scan of the original 35mm camera negative.
