= Home for the Holidays (1972 film) =

1972 television slasher film from the United States directed by John Llewellyn Moxey

- Genre: Horror; drama; suspense
- Written by: Joseph Stefano
- Directed by: John Llewellyn Moxey
- Starring: Sally Field; Jessica Walter; Eleanor Parker; Julie Harris; Jill Haworth; Walter Brennan
- Music by: George Tipton
- Country of origin: United States
- Original language: English

Production
- Executive producers: Aaron Spelling; Leonard Goldberg
- Producer: Paul Junger Witt
- Production locations: 20th Century Fox Ranch, Malibu Creek State Park - 1925 Las Virgenes Road, Calabasas, California; 20th Century Fox Studios - 10201 Pico Blvd., Century City, Los Angeles, California
- Cinematography: Leonard J. South
- Editor: Allan Jacobs
- Running time: 74 minutes
- Production companies: ABC Circle Films; Spelling-Goldberg Productions

Original release
- Network: ABC
- Release: November 28, 1972

Home for the Holidays is a 1972 American made-for-TV Christmas slasher film directed by John Llewellyn Moxey, produced by Aaron Spelling and starring Sally Field, Eleanor Parker, Julie Harris, Jessica Walter, and Walter Brennan which premiered on ABC on November 28, 1972. The plot focuses on a wealthy father on his deathbed who invites his four daughters home for Christmas and tells them he suspects his second wife of poisoning him. Shortly after, the girls learn that their stepmother was accused of killing her first husband, and they begin to fall prey to a killer dressed in a yellow rain slicker.

== Plot ==
A wealthy invalid, Benjamin Morgan, believes his second wife, Elizabeth, is trying to poison him. Alex, his daughter, believes him. Thus, she summons her three sisters—Freddie, Jo, and Chris—to the Morgan farmhouse for Christmas. When they arrive, Mr. Morgan calls them to his room and urges them to kill their stepmom before she kills all of them.

Later, as Elizabeth prepares dinner, Freddie's screams are heard from upstairs. The sisters find a drunken Freddie clutching a glass of vodka in one hand, with a shard of glass cutting into her other hand. They calm Freddie before putting her to bed. Later that night, a rainstorm begins. Jo, who has had enough of this reunion, asks for the loan of Alex's car to travel to the local train station. After bidding all goodbye, she approaches the car and suddenly becomes victim to a mysterious figure in a yellow rain slicker, wielding a pitchfork. Later that evening, Freddie continues to drink profusely, eventually passing out in a warm bath. Soon, the intruder in the yellow slicker appears and drowns her in the tub.

The next morning, Chris discovers Freddie's body in the tub. Alex accuses Elizabeth of poisoning Freddie, a claim she denies, while Benjamin initially assumes Freddie committed suicide. Chris dials the police, but the phone line is dead. She then embarks through a wooded area to use a neighbor's phone. On the way, she is trailed by the figure in the yellow slicker. After eluding her nemesis, she returns to the Morgan farmhouse. Upon arriving, she sees Alex's car still inside the barn. While investigating, she stumbles upon Jo's dead body. Elizabeth appears suddenly from outside, telling her to come with her. Instead, Chris panics, runs inside the house, locks the door, and discovers Benjamin dead.

Chris screams, bolts from the house, and flags down a passing car—which turns out to be driven by Alex. Chris explains that Elizabeth has murdered everyone, but Alex confesses she is the actual killer. Suffering from childhood persecution fantasies resulting in resentment of her siblings, Alex handily set up stepmother Elizabeth as a patsy. She then assaults Chris with a tire iron, her body falling down the hill and out of sight. Hoping to complete the frame-up on Elizabeth, Alex invites investigators to accompany her to the farmhouse. However, Alex sails into hysteria upon seeing Chris still alive. Chris watches the police lead Alex away. In the end, Elizabeth is left to tend to the Morgan farmhouse alone.

== Cast ==
- Jessica Walter as Frederica Morgan
- Sally Field as Christine Morgan
- Eleanor Parker as Alexandra Morgan
- Julie Harris as Elizabeth Hall Morgan
- Walter Brennan as Benjamin Morgan
- Jill Haworth as Joanna Morgan
- John Fink as Dr. Ted Lindsay
- Med Flory as Sheriff Nolan

== Production ==
Kim Novak was originally cast in the role of Alexandra Morgan, but dropped out shortly before production and was replaced by Eleanor Parker.

Principal photography of Home for the Holidays took place at the 20th Century-Fox ranch, located within the Malibu Creek State Park.

== Release ==
The film debuted on the American Broadcasting Company on November 28, 1972, as part of the ABC Movie of the Week series.

=== Home media ===
Vidmark Entertainment released Home for the Holidays on VHS in 1985. The film was released on DVD by Echo Bridge Home Entertainment on May 7, 2013, as a part of its "8 Midnight Horror Movies" pack. Echo Bridge later re-released the film on September 9, 2014, and on June 23, 2015.

== Reception ==
A psychological interpretation of Home for the Holidays' storyline can be found in David Deal's critique, from his book Television Fright Films of the 1970s. He notes that the four Morgan daughters in the film all have masculine first-names, implying that "the father had always wanted sons and was therefore unforgiving of his progeny, [causing] the break in family ties." However, Deal also notes that "such subtleties are admirable but unnecessary" considering the film's chief purpose was to frighten TV audiences. The author goes on to assail John Llewelyn Moxey's direction as being strictly pedestrian, with "very little visual flair or suspense, where a touch of either would have gone a long way."

In A Scary Little Christmas: A History of Yuletide Horror Films, 1972-2020 (2022), writer Matthew DuPée praises the film, noting that it "excels with its well-crafted story, despite some of its soap opera attributes."

However, critic Howard Thompson of The New York Times was less sparing in his criticism, published the morning of the film's prime-time premiere. According to his article, "you never saw a grislier, wetter and flatter Yuletide meatball in the guise of a thriller." Ticking off the body count and describing how each victim is murdered, Thompson finally observes that "[if] you...really care whodunit, simply pick the shiftiest pair of eyes on the premises. This is a Christmas present? Somebody's got to be kidding."

Chloe Walker of Paste magazine praised the film in a 2022 retrospective, noting its strong cast as well as its screenplay by Joseph Stefano.

Justin Kerswell from Hysteria Lives! awarded the film 4/5 stars, writing, "Perhaps the film sails too close to soap opera histrionics at times... However, the performances are roundly so good that this doesn't matter, plus the story just keeps twisting and turning."

Brett Gallman from Oh, the Horror! wrote, "Unfolding like a film adaptation of an Agatha Christie play, Home For the Holidays often feels stagebound and hemmed up; if not for beating the “Christmas horrors” out of the gate, I suspect it may be even more obscure than it already is, despite all of the talent involved. As it stands, it's a movie you'll probably hear about this time every year when horror fans begin to discuss the holiday-tinged offerings, and this is one of the last courses you'll ever need to digest."

== Sources ==
- Deal, David (2015). Television Fright Films of the 1970s. Jefferson, North Carolina: McFarland & Company. ISBN 978-0-786-45514-0.
- DuPée, Matthew C. (2022). A Scary Little Christmas: A History of Yuletide Horror Films, 1972-2020. Jefferson, North Carolina: McFarland & Company. ISBN 978-1-476-64540-7.
