= The Candy Man (film) =

Film directed by Herbert J. Leder

- Theatrical release poster
- Directed by: Herbert J. Leder
- Screenplay by: Herbert J. Leder
- Story by: Francis Swann
- Produced by: Herbert J. Leder
- Starring: George Sanders; Leslie Parrish; Manolo Fábregas; Pixie Hopkin; Félix González; Pedro Galván
- Cinematography: Gabriel Torres
- Edited by: Juan José Marino
- Music by: Berge Kalajian; Gus Pardalis
- Production company: Sagittarius Productions
- Distributed by: Allied Artists Pictures
- Release date: February 1969
- Running time: 97 minutes
- Country: United States
- Language: English

The Candy Man is a 1969 American crime film written and directed by Herbert J. Leder from a story by Francis Swann. The film stars George Sanders, Leslie Parrish, Manolo Fábregas, Pixie Hopkin, Félix González and Pedro Galván. The film was released in February 1969, by Allied Artists Pictures.

== Plot ==
Julia Evans, an American actress travels to Mexico with her young daughter. Drug dealer Sidney Carter spots the pair and decides to kidnap the young child. Carter enlists the services of his addict customer, Rick Pierce. The child's nanny, Greta, at first agrees to go along with the plot, but has second thoughts when the time comes. Greta attempts to fight off Pierce, but the young daughter is snatched by another woman. Carter approaches Evans with his ransom demands. The police are called by Roger, Evans' manager, and her ex-husband Lee. Officer Lieutenant Garcia tracks down the child after the ransom is paid, and confronts Carter. After a chase Carter is cornered near a hotel window, and falls to his death during the struggle, and the daughter is saved. Mother, father, and daughter are then reunited.

== Cast ==
- George Sanders as Sidney Carter
- Leslie Parrish as Julie Evans
- Manolo Fábregas as Lt. Garcia
- Pixie Hopkin as Maria Lopez
- Félix González as Felipe Lopez
- Pedro Galván as Roger West
- Gina Romand as Greta Hansen
- José Ángel Espinosa 'Ferrusquilla' as The Vagabond
- Nancy Rodman as Gwen Easterly
- Chuck Anderson as Lee Stevens
- Carlos Cortés as Rick Pierce
- John Kelly as Inspector
- Lupita Ferrat as Jenny Stevens
