= Pretty Boy Floyd (film) =

1960 film by Herbert J. Leder

- Directed by: Herbert J. Leder
- Written by: Herbert J. Leder
- Produced by: Monroe Sachson
- Starring: John Ericson; Barry Newman; Joan Harvey
- Cinematography: Chuck Austin
- Edited by: Ralph Rosenblum
- Music by: William Sanford; Del Sirino
- Production company: Le-Sac Productions
- Distributed by: Continental Distributing
- Release date: January 1960
- Running time: 96 minutes
- Country: United States
- Language: English

Pretty Boy Floyd is a 1960 biographical film based on the career of the notorious 1930s outlaw Charles Arthur "Pretty Boy" Floyd.

The film was an independent production, written and directed by Herbert J. Leder and produced by Monroe Sachson. The role of Pretty Boy Floyd was played by John Ericson and the rest of the cast included Barry Newman, Joan Harvey, Carl York, Roy Fant and a young Peter Falk in a minor role.

== Plot ==
Sources from IMDb

Charles Arthur Floyd finds work on an oil rig after serving time for armed robbery; but when he becomes involved with a married woman, her husband swears revenge. Floyd's boss doesn't know that his new employee is a jailbird.

== Cast ==
- John Ericson as Charles Arthur "Pretty Boy" Floyd
- Barry Newman as Al Riccardo
- Joan Harvey as Lil Courtney
- Carl York as Curly Winwell
- Roy Fant as Jed Watkins
- Jason Evers as Sheriff Blackie Faulkner
- Peter Falk as Shorty Walters
- Al Lewis as Machine Gun Manny
- Norman Burton as Bill Courtney
- Philip Kenneally as Baker
