= Rennert, North Carolina =

- Town
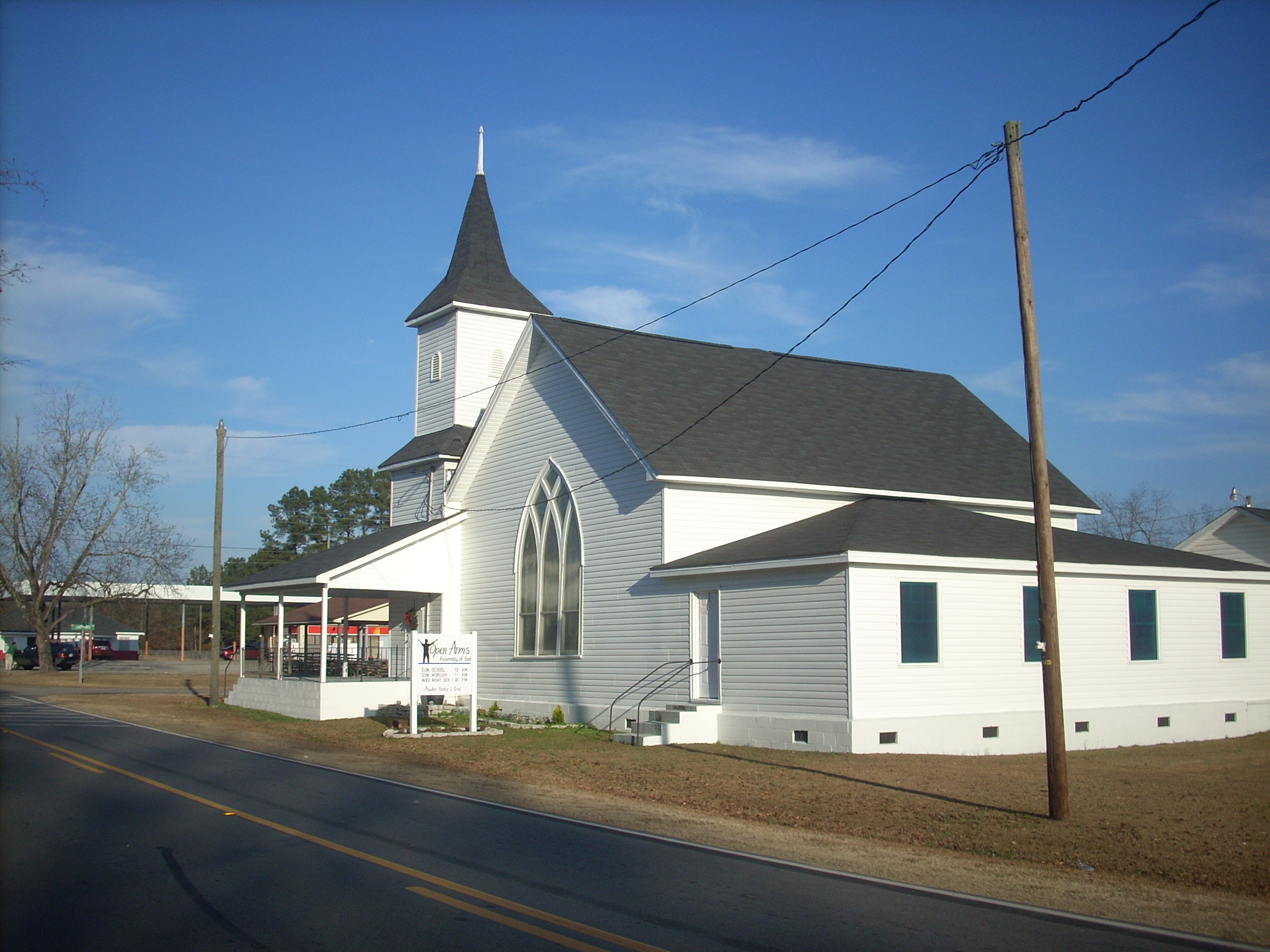
- Open Arms Assembly of God in Rennert

- Location within the state of North Carolina
- Coordinates: 34°48′51″N 79°04′45″W
- Country: United States
- State: North Carolina
- County: Robeson

Government
  - Mayor: Elizabeth Locklear

Area
  - Total: 1.10 sq mi (2.86 km^{2})
  - Land: 1.10 sq mi (2.86 km^{2})
  - Water: 0 sq mi (0.00 km^{2})
- Elevation: 184 ft (56 m)

Population (2020)
  - Total: 275
  - Density: 249.4/sq mi (96.29/km^{2})
- Time zone: UTC-5 (Eastern (EST))
  - Summer (DST): UTC-4 (EDT)
- FIPS code: 37-55940
- GNIS feature ID: 2407198

Rennert is a town in Robeson County, North Carolina, United States. The population was 275 at the 2020 census. More than one-third of the population are Native American, primarily members of the Lumbee people, who are based in Robeson County,

== History ==
The community was originally named Alpin's Grove after James McAlpin, a Scottish man who settled in the area after serving in the British army during the American Revolutionary War. He became a schoolteacher.

After the Atlantic Coast Line Railroad was laid through the community, it was renamed Rennert, the name of a hotel in New York City. It was incorporated in 1895 but had its incorporation repealed in 1947. Its incorporation was restored in 1977.

== Geography ==
According to the United States Census Bureau, the town has a total area of 0.8 square miles (2.1 km^{2}), all land.

== Demographics ==
Historical population
Census	Pop.	Note	%±
1900	133		—
1910	179		34.6%
1920	292		63.1%
1930	212		−27.4%
1980	178		—
1990	217		21.9%
2000	283		30.4%
2010	383		35.3%
2020	275		−28.2%
U.S. Decennial Census

As of the census of 2000, there were 283 people, 88 households, and 62 families residing in the town. The population density was 356.6 inhabitants per square mile (137.7/km^{2}). There were 99 housing units at an average density of 124.7 per square mile (48.1/km^{2}). The racial makeup of the town was 36.40% Native American, 30.04% African American, 24.73% White, 0.35% Asian, 7.77% from other races, and 0.71% from two or more races. Hispanic or Latino of any race were 21.20% of the population.

There were 88 households, out of which 33.0% had children under the age of 18 living with them, 43.2% were married couples living together, 20.5% had a female householder with no husband present, and 29.5% were non-families. 21.6% of all households were made up of individuals, and 13.6% had someone living alone who was 65 years of age or older. The average household size was 3.22 and the average family size was 3.73.

In the town, the population was spread out, with 32.9% under the age of 18, 14.1% from 18 to 24, 24.7% from 25 to 44, 18.4% from 45 to 64, and 9.9% who were 65 years of age or older. The median age was 27 years. For every 100 females, there were 76.9 males. For every 100 females age 18 and over, there were 88.1 males.

The median income for a household in the town was $26,250, and the median income for a family was $28,500. Males had a median income of $18,542 versus $17,656 for females. The per capita income for the town was $5,833. About 13.6% of families and 18.4% of the population were below the poverty line, including 14.3% of those under the age of eighteen and 51.9% of those 65 or over.

== Notable person ==
- James McEachin – Author and actor.

== Works cited ==
- Powell, William S. (1976). The North Carolina Gazetteer: A Dictionary of Tar Heel Places. Chapel Hill: The University of North Carolina Press. ISBN 9780807812471.
