= Petrocelli =

American television series (1974–1976)

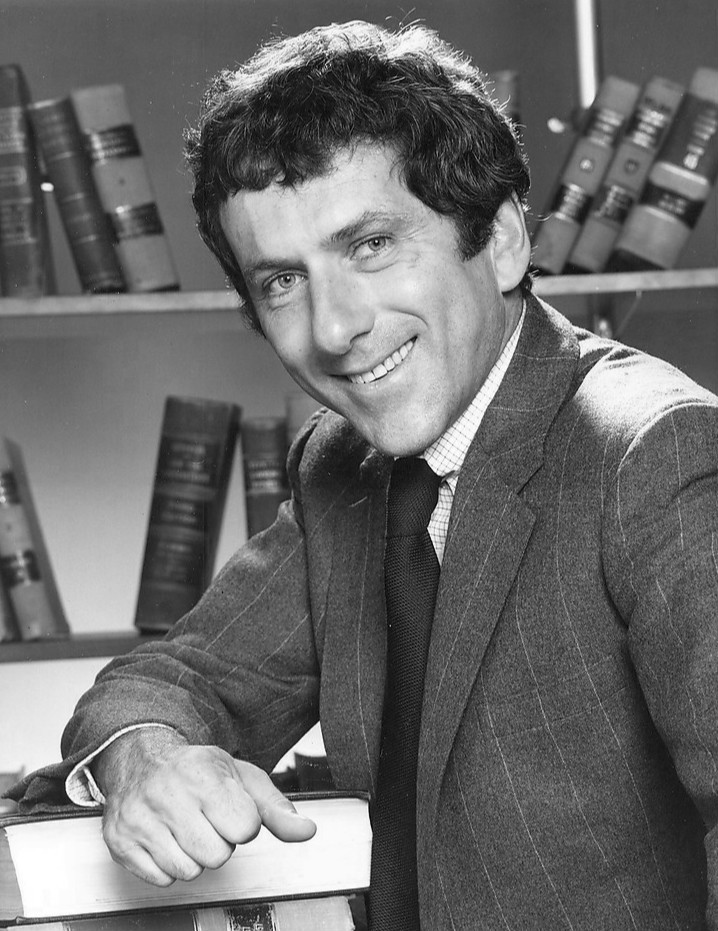
- Barry Newman as Tony Petrocelli
- Created by: Harold Buchman; Sidney J. Furie
- Based on: The Lawyer (1970 film) by Harold Buchman; Sidney J. Furie
- Developed by: E. Jack Neuman
- Starring: Barry Newman; Susan Howard; Albert Salmi; David Huddleston
- Composer: Lalo Schifrin
- Country of origin: United States
- Original language: English
- No. of seasons: 2
- No. of episodes: 45 (4 unaired) (and one pilot movie)

Production
- Executive producers: Edward K. Milkis; Thomas L. Miller
- Producer: Leonard Katzman
- Camera setup: Single-camera
- Running time: 48 minutes
- Production companies: Miller-Milkis Productions; Paramount Network Television

Original release
- Network: NBC
- Release: September 11, 1974 – March 3, 1976

Petrocelli is an American legal drama television series, which ran for two seasons on NBC from September 11, 1974, to March 3, 1976. The series is a spinoff and continuation of the 1970 film The Lawyer, starring Barry Newman as Arizona lawyer Tony Petrocelli. It was created by Harold Buchman and Sidney J. Furie, developed by E. Jack Neuman, and produced by Leonard Katzman.

== Plot ==
Tony Petrocelli is an Italian American, Harvard-educated lawyer, who grew up in South Boston and gave up the big money and frenetic pace of major-metropolitan life to practice in a sleepy city in Arizona named San Remo (filmed in Tucson, Arizona). His wife Maggie and he live in a house trailer in the country while waiting for their new home to be built (it never was completed over the course of the series). Tony drives an old pickup truck, always a little too fast. Petrocelli hired Pete Ritter, a local cowboy and ex-cop, as his investigator.

== Format ==
Petrocelli works as a defense lawyer, and each episode follows a similar format, with the clients apparently certain to be convicted of a crime of which they were innocent until a late-emerging piece of evidence allows the protagonist to suggest to the jury an alternative possibility. These alternatives never were established as absolute fact, and the trial of the persons onto whom Petrocelli turned the accusation never occurred, but the doubt raised was sufficient to secure the release of his clients.

A technique used in the TV series was showing the actual crime in flashbacks from the perspective of various people involved. The flashbacks differed depending on whose recollections were being shown. To maximize the drama, the prosecution's version was always the first flashback shown (i.e. what supposedly happened), then the client's version was presented (what the client remembered happening), then, finally, after finishing his investigation, Petrocelli presented his version (generally meant to be what, in fact, occurred). This final flashback always contained elements of the prosecution's and his client's versions, but with his newfound evidence; it showed both the client's innocence and an explanation as to how and why the prosecution and client's versions differed. In other words, neither side was meant to be corrupt or lying, rather, without Petrocelli's information, both previous versions appeared to be accurate from their respective points of view.

== Main cast ==
- Barry Newman as Anthony J. Petrocelli
- Susan Howard as Maggie Petrocelli
- Albert Salmi as Pete Ritter
- David Huddleston as Lt. John Ponce

== Episodes ==
=== Pilot (1974) ===
A 90-minute TV movie aired as a pilot on March 16, 1974.

| Title | Directed by | Written by | Original release date |
|---|---|---|---|
| "Night Games" | Don Taylor | E. Jack Neuman | March 16, 1974 |

=== Season 1 (1974–75) ===
| No. overall | No. in season | Title | Directed by | Written by | Original release date |
|---|---|---|---|---|---|
| 1 | 1 | "The Golden Cage" | Joseph Pevney | Story by : Eric Bercovici; Teleplay by : Dan Ullman | September 11, 1974 |
A wealthy man's wife, who is seeking divorce from him, finds herself accused of murder, and it falls on Petrocelli to find out exactly what happened.
| 2 | 2 | "Music to Die By" | Paul Stanley | Oliver Crawford | September 18, 1974 |
A country singer (Rick Nelson) hires Petrocelli to get clear of a murder charge, as he finds his career in serious hot water.
| 3 | 3 | "By Reason of Madness" | James Sheldon | William Kelley | September 25, 1974 |
A wife insists she is innocent of her husband's murder. Guest stars include Lynda Day George, Loretta Swit, James McEachin, John Vernon and Rory Calhoun.
| 4 | 4 | "Edge of Evil" | Irving J. Moore | Story by : Mel Goldberg; Teleplay by : Dan Ullman | October 2, 1974 |
Murder is the result when ecological information is revealed. Guest stars include William Shatner, Lynn Carlin, Glenn Corbett and Susan Oliver.
| 5 | 5 | "A Life for a Life" | Allen Reisner | William D. Gordon & James Doherty | October 9, 1974 |
Arson and murder are two things that unfortunately go together for a young man who seeks Tony's help. Guest stars include Geoffrey Deuel and Sharon Farrell.
| 6 | 6 | "Death in High Places" | Richard Donner | Leo Pipkin | October 23, 1974 |
Tony's on the case as a spoiled heiress faces a murder rap after her wealthy father is killed. Guest stars include Cameron Mitchell and Belinda Montgomery.
| 7 | 7 | "The Double Negative" | Herb Wallerstein | Robert C. Dennis | October 30, 1974 |
Blackmail's the name of the game and a former Army colonel's son stands accused. Fritz Weaver is one of the guest stars.
| 8 | 8 | "Mirror, Mirror on the Wall..." | Irving J. Moore | Leonard Katzman | November 6, 1974 |
The evidence says she was at the scene of the crime, but the woman at the center of the murder case says she was somewhere else. Tony finds himself in a case of "double trouble". Stefanie Powers is one of the guest stars.
| 9 | 9 | "An Act of Love" | Paul Stanley | Leonard Katzman | November 13, 1974 |
When a senator's daughter, who became a call girl, is discovered dead, Tony gets down to the bottom of things. David Carson plays the man accused of killing the young woman.
| 10 | 10 | "A Very Lonely Lady" | Vincent McEveety | Robert Stull | November 27, 1974 |
A murder charge against a drifter has Tony trying to figure out how a young woman got killed.
| 11 | 11 | "Counterploy" | James Sheldon | Edward J. Lakso | December 4, 1974 |
A love triangle turns deadly and Tony gets involved when a young local policeman is accused of fatally shooting his wife's lover.
| 12 | 12 | "A Covenant with Evil" | James Sheldon | Story by : Bob Green & Bill Harley; Teleplay by : Bob Green & Bill Harley & William Kelley | December 18, 1974 |
The death of a nurse has Tony defending a young man with a mental illness.
| 13 | 13 | "The Sleep of Reason" | Irving J. Moore | William Kelley | January 15, 1975 |
A man fatally shoots a college professor, but later has no recollection of the event. Can Tony put two and two together?
| 14 | 14 | "A Fallen Idol" | Herb Wallerstein | Leonard Katzman | January 22, 1975 |
A boxer and his dead manager puts Tony on the case to determine what happened.
| 15 | 15 | "Once Upon a Victim" | Herschel Daugherty | Story by : Stanley Roberts; Teleplay by : Leonard Katzman & Stanley Roberts | January 29, 1975 |
A murder in the medical world has Tony checking out the circumstances behind a wealthy woman's demise.
| 16 | 16 | "The Kidnapping" | Gunnar Hellstrom | Robert C. Dennis | February 5, 1975 |
A mother (Kim Darby) resorts to kidnapping as she takes her son from her wealthy father-in-law. There is also a murder.
| 17 | 17 | "A Lonely Victim" | Irving J. Moore | Leonard Katzman | February 19, 1975 |
Another deadly love triangle. A dead man. A woman accused of the fatal event. Tony has a complicated situation on his hands.
| 18 | 18 | "The Outsiders" | Irving J. Moore | Leonard Katzman & Thomas L. Miller | February 26, 1975 |
Complications arise when a farm family goes into town and murders take place. Not helping matters? One of the kids is accused. Tony has to set things straight.
| 19 | 19 | "Vengeance in White" | Leonard Katzman | Robert Stull | March 5, 1975 |
What happens when the manager of a religious figure is killed? That's for Tony to find out.
| 20 | 20 | "Four the Hard Way" | Joseph Pevney | William Kelley | March 13, 1975 |
When the son-in-law of one of four men of a pinochle card game club is killed, it's up to Tony to try to clear the father-in-law.
| 21 | 21 | "Death in Small Doses" | Don Taylor | Al Reynolds & John Dawson | March 27, 1975 |
A nurse is killed. So is her boyfriend. The accused? The grandson of the boyfriend. Tony is tasked to tackle this tricky mystery. This episode aired on a Thursday night.
| 22 | 22 | "A Night of Terror" | Bernard McEveety | William Kelley | April 2, 1975 |
A woman stands accused of shooting her boyfriend. Things get complicated when she becomes unconscious during a fight that leads to his death. Can Tony get through this difficult mess? This episode aired at 9 pm ET.

=== Season 2 (1975–76) ===
| No. overall | No. in season | Title | Directed by | Written by | Original release date |
|---|---|---|---|---|---|
| 23 | 1 | "Death Ride" | Irving J. Moore | Leonard Katzman | September 10, 1975 |
| 24 | 2 | "The Mark of Cain" | Leonard Katzman | Leonard Katzman | September 17, 1975 |
| 25 | 3 | "Five Yards of Trouble" | Joseph Pevney | William Keys | September 24, 1975 |
| 26 | 4 | "Shadow of Fear" | Irving J. Moore | Leonard Katzman | October 1, 1975 |
| 27 | 5 | "Chain of Command" | Herb Wallerstein | Katharyn & Michael Michaelian | October 8, 1975 |
| 28 | 6 | "To See No Evil" | Irving J. Moore | Leonard Katzman & Thomas L. Miller | October 29, 1975 |
| 29 | 7 | "Terror on Wheels" | Herb Wallerstein | Story by : Peter Lefcourt; Teleplay by : Peter Lefcourt & Leonard Katzman | November 5, 1975 |
| 30 | 8 | "The Gamblers" | Herb Wallerstein | John Hudock | November 12, 1975 |
| 31 | 9 | "Shadow of Doubt" | Irving J. Moore | Story by : Deena Silver-Kramer; Teleplay by : Jeff Myrow | November 19, 1975 |
| 32 | 10 | "Terror by Book" | Irving J. Moore | Thomas L. Miller | December 10, 1975 |
| 33 | 11 | "Face of Evil" | Herb Wallerstein | Fred Freiberger | December 17, 1975 |
| 34 | 12 | "Too Many Alibis" | Irving J. Moore | Leonard Katzman | December 24, 1975 |
| 35 | 13 | "A Deadly Vow" | Russ Mayberry | Leonard Katzman | December 31, 1975 |
| 36 | 14 | "Jubilee Jones" | Art Fisher | Leonard Katzman | January 14, 1976 |
| 37 | 15 | "The Falling Star" | Robert Scheerer | Leonard Katzman | January 21, 1976 |
| 38 | 16 | "Survival" | Irving J. Moore | Story by : Norman Lessing; Teleplay by : Leonard Katzman | January 28, 1976 |
| 39 | 17 | "The Night Visitor" | Leonard Katzman | Jeff Myrow & Leonard Katzman | February 4, 1976 |
| 40 | 18 | "Blood Money" | Don Weis | John Hudock | February 11, 1976 |
| 41 | 19 | "Any Number Can Die" | Paul Lynch | Kathy Donnell & Madeline DiMaggio | February 18, 1976 |
| 42 | 20 | "Six Strings of Guilt" | Joseph Pevney | Mann Rubin | February 25, 1976 |
| 43 | 21 | "Deadly Journey" | Jerry London | Sean Forestal | March 3, 1976 |
| 44 | 22 | "The Pay Off" | Victor French | John Hudock | April 4, 1976 |

== Guest stars ==
- Anne Archer
- Ned Beatty
- Stefanie Powers
- Lucille Benson
- Lynn Borden
- Nancy Criss
- Kim Darby
- Susan Dey
- Bobby Eilbacher
- Harrison Ford
- Ron Foster
- Alan Fudge
- Lynda Day George
- Louis Gossett Jr.
- Harold Gould
- Mark Hamill
- Robert Hooks
- Julie Kavner
- Sally Kirkland
- Kay Lenz
- Strother Martin
- Debbie McGee
- Gerald McRaney
- Belinda Montgomery
- Lee Montgomery
- James Naughton
- Annette O'Toole
- Della Reese
- Peter Mark Richman
- Robbie Rist
- John Ritter
- Marion Ross
- John Saxon
- Simon Scott
- William Shatner
- Loretta Swit
- Joan Van Ark
- Mitch Vogel
- Cindy Williams
- Noble Willingham
- William Windom

== Home media ==
Visual Entertainment released the complete series on DVD in Region 1 on December 16, 2016.

== Books about the series ==
- Petrocelli: San Remo Justice: An Episode Guide and Much More by Sandra Grabman, published 2018 by BearManor Media. ISBN 978-1-62933-205-5
