= Witch Hunt (British TV series) =

1967 British TV series

Witch Hunt was a 1967 British supernatural television drama series shown on BBC2. Starring Patrick Kavanagh and Anna Palk, and unfolding over five episodes. The plot involves a man, Rex Fordham, who moves to the Gloucestershire countryside to recover from malaria caught in Kenya, and uncovers a secret witchcraft cult. Written by Jon Manchip White, directed by Peter Duguid, and produced by Alan Bromly. Derek Francis was also in the cast.
