= It! (1967 film) =

1967 British film by Herbert J. Leder

- 1967 U.K. theatrical release poster
- Directed by: Herbert J. Leder
- Written by: Herbert J. Leder
- Produced by: Robert Goldstein (exec. producer); Herbert J. Leder; Tom Sachs (assoc. producer)
- Starring: Roddy McDowall; Jill Haworth; Paul Maxwell; Alan Sellers
- Cinematography: Davis Boulton
- Edited by: Tom Simpson
- Music by: Carlo Martelli
- Production company: Gold Star Films Ltd.
- Distributed by: Warner-Pathé Distributors; Warner Bros.-Seven Arts
- Release date: 15 November 1967
- Running time: 97 minutes
- Country: United Kingdom
- Language: English

It! (also known as Anger of the Golem and Curse of the Golem) is a 1967 British horror film directed, produced and written by Herbert J. Leder and starring Roddy McDowall, Jill Haworth and Paul Maxwell. It was made by Seven Arts Productions and Gold Star Productions, Ltd.

A museum curator brings the Golem of Prague to life.

== Plot ==
A London museum's warehouse burns down, leaving undamaged a statue that the museum curator, Mr. Grove, identifies as "Mid-European Primitive." Grove is mysteriously killed while inspecting the artifact when his assistant, Arthur Pimm, is sent to fetch a flashlight for him. This begins a series of unexplained deaths and calamities connected with the statue, which is later positively identified as the Golem of Judah Loew of the 16th century.

Arthur Pimm, a Norman Bates-like character, who keeps his mother's corpse in his apartment and borrows museum jewelry exhibits to adorn it, brings the Golem to life by placing a small scroll containing the Hebrew word "emeth" ("truth") into its mouth, which he finds in a compartment located at the top of the Golem's right foot. The Golem then becomes Pimm's accomplice in murder and mayhem, contrary to its original purpose to defend its community. When the Golem is suspected of bringing about the catastrophic destruction of Hammersmith Bridge, Pimm tries to destroy it. This is impossible, as the inscription predicts: "for neither by fire, nor water, nor force, nor anything by man created" can it be destroyed. This is borne out in the final scenes of the film by the detonation of a small nuclear warhead in an attempt to stop it.

Caught up in all of this is Ellen Grove, the daughter of the first deceased curator with whom Pimm is in love, but she falls in love with Jim Perkins of the New York Museum, who identifies the Golem and seeks to acquire it for his museum. Perkins exposes Pimm to the police, and Pimm is committed to an insane asylum. He breaks out of the asylum and kidnaps Ellen with the help of the Golem. Pimm holes up in the museum's annex in the country known as "the Cloisters." Perkins dramatically saves Ellen from the aforementioned nuclear explosion that vaporizes both Pimm and "the Cloisters," but not the Golem which, for unknown reasons, retreats into the sea.

== Cast ==
- Roddy McDowall as Arthur Pimm
- Jill Haworth as Ellen Grove
- Paul Maxwell as Jim Perkins
- Aubrey Richards as Professor Weal
- Ernest Clark as Harold Grove
- Oliver Johnston as Curator Trimingham
- Noel Trevarthen as Inspector White
- Ian McCulloch as Detective Wayne
- Richard Goolden as the old rabbi
- Dorothy Frere as Miss Swanson
- Tom Chatto as the captain
- Steve Kirby as Ellis the electrician
- Russell Napier as boss
- Frank Sieman as museum workman
- Brian Haines as first museum guard
- John Baker as second museum guard
- Mark Burns as first officer
- Raymond Adamson as second officer
- Lindsay Campbell as policeman
- Alan Seller as the Golem of Prague

== Release ==
=== Theatrical release ===
Since Seven Arts Productions acquired Warner Bros. Pictures in 1967, the film was released by Warner Bros.-Seven Arts in the United States. The film was widely released in the U.S. in 1967 as a double feature with The Frozen Dead.

=== Home media ===
It! was released on DVD on 9 December 2008 when Warner Home Video released it with The Shuttered Room (1967) on Warner Home Video Horror Double Feature.

== Reception ==
The Monthly Film Bulletin wrote: "The trouble with the audacious and interesting idea of reviving the Golem story (and due reference is made in this film to the silent German cinema) is that to do it justice requires a sizeable budget and spectacular special effects – both of which are lacking here. It needed, say, Toho, to make something stunning of the untoward demolition of Hammersmith Bridge, a scene which is here rather feeble. The Golem itself, however, is rather a gem, and the transition from a static state to an ambling sort of locomotion is effectively accomplished. The narrative is serviceable, but tends to evolve in fits and starts, and never quite decides what to do with the character of Pimm. The opening scene, in which we find him living with his mother, whose singular uncommunicativeness is shortly explained by the fact that she is merely a clothed skeleton, properly suggests that there is something odd about this Pimm. And this piece of macabre fun is justified by the ending (by which time the plot has disintegrated) in which mother has a part to play. Here and there the film is good enough to make one wish that it had a little more style and invention."

The Radio Times Guide to Films gave the film 2/5 stars, writing: "Director Herbert J Leder made this dismal attempt to resurrect the legend of the Golem monster most famously filmed in 1920 by Paul Wegener for Swinging Sixties audiences. Roddy McDowall is an assistant museum curator, living with the mummified corpse of his mother (Psycho has a lot to answer for), who revives the original Golem to do his psychopathic bidding. A confused mix of black humour and horror, this lacks style, invention and (crucially) budget."

Jason P. Vargo from IGN awarded the film a score of 4/10, calling it "a sub-par creature feature".

Author and film critic Leonard Maltin gave the film two out of four stars.

David Camak Pratt from PopMatters, reviewing the double feature DVD release, awarded it three out of 10 stars. In his review, Pratt called the film "uneven" and "ridiculous", criticizing the film's Psycho-like plot points as being both obvious and pointless.

== See also ==
- Daimajin - Japanese tokusatsu franchise with potential influences on It!
