= G-Men from Hell =

- Directed by: Christopher Coppola
- Written by: Robert Cooper; Richard L. Albert; Nicholas Johnson
- Based on: Grafik Muzik by: Mike Allred
- Produced by: Richard L. Albert
- Starring: William Forsythe; Tate Donovan; Bobcat Goldthwait; Barry Newman; Zach Galligan; Vanessa Angel; Paul Rodriguez; David Huddleston; Kari Wuhrer; Charles Fleischer; Gary Busey; Robert Goulet
- Cinematography: Dean Lent
- Edited by: Robert Gordon
- Music by: Greg DeBelles
- Production company: Sawmill Entertainment
- Release date: July 22, 2000 (San Diego Comic-Con)
- Running time: 98 minutes
- Country: United States
- Language: English
- Budget: <$10 million

G-Men from Hell (released on DVD as Michael Allred's G-Men from Hell) is a 2000 American comedy film directed by Christopher Coppola and written by Robert Cooper, Richard L. Albert, and Nicholas Johnson. It is based on Michael Allred's comic book series Grafik Muzik published by Caliber Press. It stars William Forsythe and Tate Donovan as two violent FBI agents who die, go to hell, and escape back to Earth, where they become embroiled in a mystery.

== Plot ==
When corrupt FBI agents Dean Crept and Mike Mattress die, they are sent to Hell, though they believe it must be an error. They escape by stealing a magical crystal from Satan that sends them back to Earth. Determined to buy their way into Heaven, the two perform good deeds despite their ignorance of morality. They set up a private investigation business, and Greydon Lake and his wife, Gloria, both hire them to investigate the other. They attempt to solve the mystery of their own murders and evade the police, led by Lt. Langdon and Det. Dalton, who suspect them of killing their informant Buster. Meanwhile, Weenie Man, a shady informant also sent to hell, tells Satan about their escape; Satan gives the G-Men two days to complete their investigations and return his magic crystal. Along the way, they become involved with the plots of a mad scientist, Dr. Boifford, who resurrects Buster, and a superhero by the name of Cheetah Man.

== Cast ==
- William Forsythe as FBI Agent Dean Crept
- Tate Donovan as FBI Agent Mike Mattress
- Bobcat Goldthwait as Buster Lloyd
- Barry Newman as Greydon Lake
- Zach Galligan as Detective Dalton
- Vanessa Angel as Gloria Lake
- Paul Rodriguez as Winiford "Weenie" Man
- David Huddleston as Dr. Boifford
- Kari Wuhrer as Marete
- Charles Fleischer as Martin / Pete
- Gregory Sporleder as Cheetah Man
- Gary Busey as Lieutenant Langdon
- Robert Goulet as Satan

== Production ==
Production began on October 24, 1999, in Los Angeles. It finished post-production in March 2000. Allred had no involvement in the film's production, though he appeared in a cameo.

== Release ==
A preview of G-Men from Hell screened at the 2000 San Diego Comic-Con. Advanced Film released it in Germany, and Framework Entertainment released it on DVD in the US in 2002.

== Reception ==
Dennis Harvey of Variety called it a goofy, nonsensical mystery that is somewhat entertaining. Nathan Rabin of The A.V. Club wrote, "G-Men's bare-bones production values are forgivable, but its lack of wit and creativity isn't." Rachel Morgan of Film Threat rated it 3.5/5 stars and wrote, "The film is super campy, but fun to watch." At DVD Talk, Earl Cressey rated it 2/5 stars and Bill Gibron rated it 1.5/5 stars; both called it boring and poorly acted. In Fervid Filmmaking, author and filmmaker Mike Watt wrote that the film is "the epitome of a Kitchen Sink movie", in which a cult film throws in every bizarre idea they can imagine.
