= Harold Gould =

American actor (1923–2010)

- Gould in The Feather & Father Gang, 1976
- Born: Harold Vernon Goldstein; December 10, 1923; Schenectady, New York, U.S.
- Died: September 11, 2010 (aged 86); Woodland Hills, California, U.S.
- Occupation: Actor
- Years active: 1955–2010
- Spouse: Lea Shampanier-Vernon (m. 1950)
- Children: 3
- Military career
- Allegiance: United States
- Branch: United States Army
- Conflicts: World War II

Harold Vernon Goldstein (December 10, 1923 – September 11, 2010), better known as Harold Gould, was an American character actor. He appeared as Martin Morgenstern on the sitcom Rhoda (1974–78) and Miles Webber on the sitcom The Golden Girls (1985–92). A five-time Emmy Award nominee, Gould acted in television, film, and theatre for more than 50 years, appearing in more than 300 television shows, 20 major motion pictures, and over 100 stage plays. He was known for playing elegant, well-dressed men (as in The Sting), and he regularly played Jewish characters and grandfather-type figures on television and in film.

== Early life ==
Gould was born in Schenectady, New York. He was the son of Louis Goldstein, a postal worker, and Lillian, a homemaker who did part-time work for the New York State Health Department. Gould was raised in the Jewish faith in Colonie, New York and was valedictorian of his high school class. He enrolled at Albany Teachers College upon graduation and studied to become a social studies or English public high school teacher.

After two years in college, Gould enlisted in the United States Army during World War II and saw combat in France in a chemical mortar battalion. He developed trench foot and was sent back to England to recover. After convalescence, Gould served in a rail transport unit in France.

After the war, Gould returned to Albany Teachers College and changed his major to study drama and theatre and graduated with a Bachelor of Arts degree in 1947. He performed in summer stock theatre on Cape Cod, then decided to enroll at Cornell University to study drama and speech. Gould earned a Master of Arts degree in 1948 and a Ph.D. in theatre in 1953 from Cornell as well as meeting his future wife, Lea Vernon.

== Career ==
Upon graduation, Gould accepted a position at Randolph-Macon Woman's College in Lynchburg, Virginia, where he spent three years teaching and doing stage work. He made his professional theatre debut in 1955 portraying third President Thomas Jefferson in The Common Glory in Williamsburg, Virginia.

In 1956, Gould was offered a professorship in the drama department at the University of California, Riverside, which he accepted. He taught there for four years until 1960 when he decided to try professional acting himself. He had difficulty finding acting jobs at first and had to take side work as a security guard and as a part-time acting teacher at UCLA.

Gould made his film debut in an uncredited role in Two for the Seesaw (1962). His first credited role was a small part in The Coach (also 1962). That same year he appeared as Prosecutor Tom Finney on The Virginian in the episode titled "The Accomplice." After uncredited appearances in Alfred Hitchcock's Marnie (1964) and The Satan Bug (1965), Gould gradually found more work with credited roles in The Yellow Canary (1964), a Rod Serling film starring Pat Boone, Jack Klugman, and Barbara Eden; Inside Daisy Clover (1965); and Harper (1966) starring Paul Newman.

Gould began appearing regularly in television in the 1960s and 1970s including roles in the children's sitcom Dennis the Menace, followed by numerous other shows of various types / genres such as – Dr. Kildare, Hazel, The Twilight Zone, The Donna Reed Show, Get Smart, Hogan's Heroes, Gunsmoke, I Dream of Jeannie, The Flying Nun, The F.B.I., The Big Valley, Mission: Impossible, The Man from U.N.C.L.E., Cannon, and Hawaii Five-O where he made multiple appearances as Honore Vashon, one of that series' most memorable villains. Gould originated the role of Marlo Thomas's father in the 1965 pilot for That Girl, but the series role was later recast with Lew Parker. Gould appeared in The Long, Hot Summer and He & She, two short-lived television series.

He also appeared in a pilot later broadcast as a 1972 episode of Love, American Style titled "Love and the Happy Days" in the role of Howard Cunningham, the frustrated father of a high schooler named Richie Cunningham (played by Ron Howard). Gould agreed to reprise the role on the upcoming series Happy Days; however, when production of Happy Days was delayed, he went abroad to perform in a play. Midway through the play's run, after learning the TV series was ready to begin shooting, he decided to honor his commitment to the stage production and passed on the role. This led to the role being recast with Tom Bosley. Gould would later state that a requirement to shave the beard he wore at the time was another factor in his decision to decline the repeat role.

Gould worked steadily in television and film for nearly fifteen years before his career began to gain momentum with his portrayal of "Kid Twist' in the fake horse racing gambling hall set up in The Sting (1973), winner of seven Academy Awards, including Best Picture of that year. He went on to appear in Woody Allen's Love and Death (1975) and the Disney film Gus (1976). He was "Engulf," the villainous head of a conglomerate, in Silent Movie (1976), directed by Mel Brooks, and made guest appearances on television shows such as Petrocelli, The Love Boat and Soap where he played the hospital roommate of Jody Dallas (Billy Crystal).

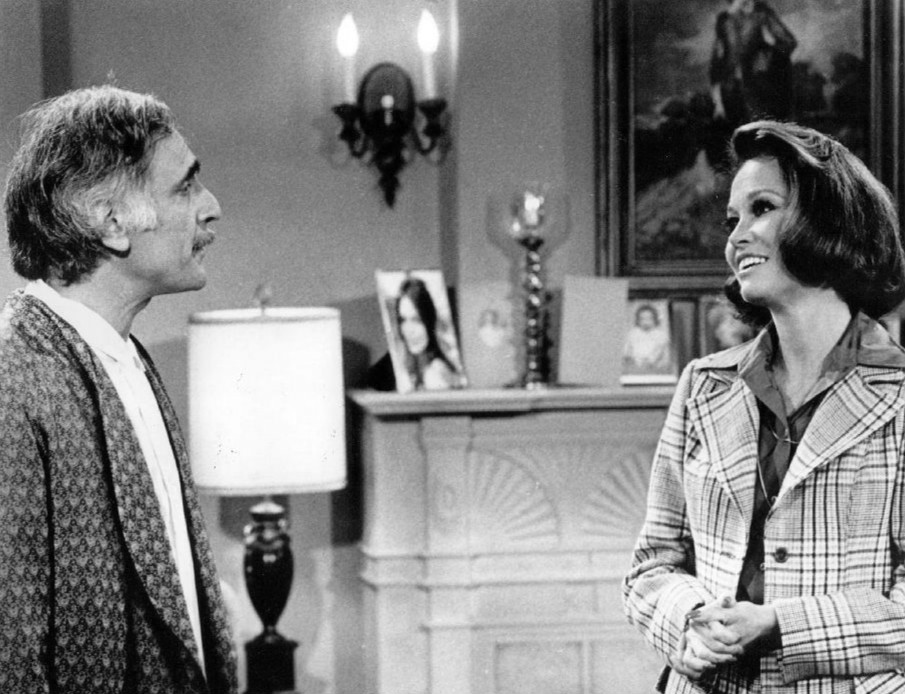
As Martin Morgenstern on The Mary Tyler Moore Show in 1973

In 1972, Gould was cast as Martin Morgenstern, the father of Mary's best friend Rhoda, in an episode of The Mary Tyler Moore Show. He reprised the role the following year and was hired as a regular when Rhoda became a spin-off in 1974. Gould appeared in the short-lived 1977 series The Feather and Father Gang, starring as Harry Danton, a smooth-talking ex-con man, with Stefanie Powers as Toni "Feather" Danton, his daughter and a hard-working, successful lawyer. The show was canceled after 13 episodes, and Gould returned to Rhoda for the remainder of its run.

Gould also appeared in the miniseries Washington: Behind Closed Doors. In the 1980 NBC miniseries The Scarlett O'Hara War, he portrayed MGM mogul Louis B. Mayer which gained him an Emmy nomination. He appeared as Chad Lowe's grandfather in Spencer and played a Jewish widower wooing the Christian Katharine Hepburn in Mrs. Delafield Wants to Marry. Other roles included a married man having an affair with another member of his Yiddish-speaking club in an episode of the PBS series The Sunset Years and as the owner of a deli grooming two African-American men to inherit his business in Singer & Sons. Gould received Emmy nominations for his roles in Rhoda, Mrs. Delafield Wants to Marry, and Moviola.

Gould played Miles Webber, the steadfast suitor of Rose Nylund (Betty White), on The Golden Girls in 12 episodes across three seasons (he also played another of Rose's boyfriends, Arnie, in one episode of the show's first season). He reprised the role of Miles in two episodes of the spin-off, The Golden Palace, where he became the character's ex-boyfriend and married someone else.

He portrayed the father of a villain called The Prankster on Lois & Clark: The New Adventures of Superman and made guest appearances on television series such as Felicity, The King of Queens, Touched by an Angel, and Judging Amy. Gould's film roles in the 1990s and 2000s include appearances in Stuart Little, Patch Adams, The Master of Disguise, the 2003 remake of Freaky Friday, Nobody's Perfect, and Whisper of the Heart.

His stage credits include Broadway theatre plays such as Jules Feiffer's Grown Ups, Neil Simon's Fools, Richard Baer's Mixed Emotions, and Tom Stoppard's Artist Descending a Staircase. Gould won an Obie Award in 1969 for his work in The Increased Difficulty of Concentration, written by Václav Havel, and reprised the role for a 1988 PBS version of the play. Gould was an early and longtime (48 years) member of Theatre West, the oldest membership theatre company in Los Angeles. He played Mr. Green in Jeff Baron's Visiting Mr. Green at the Pasadena Playhouse, and George Antrobus in Thornton Wilder's "The Skin of Our Teeth" at the Old Globe Theater, which was broadcast on PBS' American Playhouse in 1983.

== Death ==
Gould died from prostate cancer on September 11, 2010. He had two sons, Joshua and Lowell, and a daughter, Deborah. He and Lea were married for 60 years.

== Filmography ==
=== Films ===
Year	Title	Role	Notes
1951	The Man from Planet X	Frightened Villager	Uncredited
1962	The Couch	Hollingsworth	Uncredited
1962	Two for the Seesaw	Bit	Uncredited
1963	The Yellow Canary	Ponelli	
1964	Marnie	Mr. Garrett, Manager of Farm	Uncredited
1965	The Satan Bug	Dr. Ostrer	Uncredited
1965	The Spy with My Face	Doctor	
1965	Inside Daisy Clover	Cop on Pier	
1966	Harper	Sheriff	
1966	An American Dream	Ganucci's Attorney	
1968	Project X	Colonel Holt	
1969	The Arrangement	Dr. Leibman	
1970	The Lawyer	Eric P. Scott	
1971	Mrs. Pollifax-Spy	Nexdhet	
1972	Where Does It Hurt?	Dr. Zerny	
1973	The Sting	Kid Twist	
1974	The Front Page	The Mayor	
1975	The Strongest Man in the World	Regent Dietz	
1975	Love and Death	Anton	
1976	Silent Movie	Engulf	
1976	The Big Bus	Professor Baxter	
1976	Gus	Charles Gwynn	
1978	The One and Only	Hector Moses	
1980	Seems Like Old Times	Judge John Channing	
1984	The Dream Chasers	Telford Stampley	
1986	Playing for Keeps	Rockerfeller	
1989	Romero	Francisco Galedo	
1991	Birch Street Gym	Jack	Short subject
1995	Killer: A Journal of Murder	Old Henry Lesser	
1995	Lover's Knot	Alan Smithee	
1998	My Giant	Milt Kaminski	
1998	Beloved	Barber Shop Man #4	Uncredited
1998	Patch Adams	Arthur Mendelson	
1998	Brown's Requiem	Solly K	
1999	Stuart Little	Grandpa Spencer	
2001	Dying on the Edge	Arthur	
2002	The Master of Disguise	Grandfather Disguisey	
2003	Freaky Friday	Grandpa Alan Coleman	
2003	Brother Bear	Old Denahi (voice)	
2003	Nobody's Perfect		Short subject
2005	Whisper of the Heart	Shiro Nishi (voice)	English version
2005	English as a Second Language	Wayne	

=== Television ===
Year	Title	Role	Notes
1961	Dennis the Menace	Tramp	Season 3 Episode 5: "Haunted House"
1961	Dr. Kildare	Frank the Cop (uncredited)	Season 1 Episode 7: "The Lonely Ones"
1962	National Velvet		Season 2 Episode 24: "The Rumor"
1962	The Donna Reed Show	Cal Winslow	Season 5 Episode 8: "Rebel with a Cause"
1962	The Eleventh Hour	Paul Brauner	Season 1 Episode 1: "Ann Costigan: A Duel on a Field of White"
1962	The Eleventh Hour	Eric Stanger Judge	Season 1 Episode 9: "Cry a Little for Mary Too"
1962	Hazel	Mr. Prior	Season 2 Episode 1: "Hazel's Cousin"
1962–1965	The Virginian	Lacey / John Marshall Harrison / John Anderson / Adam Pendleton / Prosecutor Black / Prosecutor Tom Finney	6 episodes
1963	Dennis the Menace	Mr. Sparks	Season 4 Episode 29: "The Three F's"
1963	Dr. Kildare	Dr. Peter Duey	S2:E25, "The Dark Side of the Mirror"
1963	The Eleventh Hour	Judge	Season 2 Episode 10: "The Bride Wore Pink"
1963	Empire	Judge Will	Season 1 Episode 14: "Stopover on the Way to the Moon"
1963	The Twilight Zone	General Larrabee	Season 5 Episode 9: "Probe 7, Over and Out"
1963	The Alfred Hitchcock Hour	District Attorney	S2:E11, "How to Get Rid of Your Wife"
1964	The Man from U.N.C.L.E.	Doctor	Season 1 Episode 8: "The Double Affair"
1964	Perry Mason	Lawrence West	S8:E11, "The Case of the Latent Lover"
1964–1965	The Jack Benny Show	Director / Mr. Hunter, First IRS Man / DMV Clerk, Corrects Exam	5 episodes
1964	The Fugitive	Eller, Interviewer	Season 2 Episode 1: "Man in a Chariot"
1964	Gunsmoke	Hadley Boake	Season 10 Episode 5: "Doctor's Wife"
1964	Hazel	TV Announcer	Season 3 Episode 30: "Campaign Manager"
1964	Hazel	Mr. Wheeler	Season 4 Episode 1: "Never Trouble Trouble"
1965	Hazel	Judge Winston	Season 4 Episode 25: "George's Man Friday"
1965	Dr. Kildare	Earl McCloskey	S4:E18, "Please Let My Baby Live"
1965	The Fugitive	Dr. Willis	Season 3 Episode 1: "Wings of an Angel"
1965	That Girl	Lew Marie	Season 1 Pilot Episode: "What's in a Name?"
1965	Mister Ed	Psychiatrist	Season 5 Episode 6: "Ed the Pilot"
1965–1972	The F.B.I.	George Hale / Vincent Millard / Israel Jacobs / Martin Eldon / Doctor / Arnold Bruzzi / Dave Rice / Hans Hunter	7 episodes
1966	The Green Hornet	Calvin Ryland	Season 1 Episode 15: "May the Best Man Lose"
1966	Get Smart	Hans Hunter	Season 2 Episode 11: "The Island of the Darned"
1966	Hogan's Heroes	General Von Lintzer	Season 2 Episode 14: "Klink's Rocket"
1967	Hogan's Heroes	General von Scheider	Season 3 Episode 3: "D-Day at Stalag 13"
1967	The Fugitive	Tom Crailer	Season 4 Episode 18: "Concrete Evidence"
1967	The Invaders	Dr. Paul Mailer	Season 1 Episode 1: "The Experiment"
1967	The Invaders	Allen Slater	Season 2 Episode 6: "The Trial"
1967	The Flying Nun	Father Sweeney	Season 1 Episode 10: "With Love from Irving"
1967	The Wild Wild West	Victor Freemantle	Season 3 Episode 1: "The Night of the Bubbling Death"
1967	The Big Valley	Major Wilson	Season 2 Episode 30: "Cage of Eagles"
1967–1980	Insight	God (Old Man) / Beggar / God / Jonathan / Morris Gertz / Eddie	7 episodes
1968	The Big Valley	Judge William Daggett Captain Crawford / Harry Davis	Season 3 Episode 26: "The Challenge"
1968	The Flying Nun	Rabbi Mendez	Season 2 Episode 3: "The Rabbi and the Nun"
1968	The Wild Wild West	John Taney	Season 4 Episode 11: "The Night of the Avaricious Actuary"
1969	The Big Valley	Captain Crawford / Harry Davis	Season 4 Episode 19: "The Royal Road"
1969	The Debbie Reynolds Show	Whitaker	Season 1 Episode 1: "That's Debbie"
1969	Mission: Impossible	Vincente Bravo	Season 4 Episode 1: "The Code"
1969	I Dream of Jeannie	Irwin Winkler	Season 4 Episode 16: "Invisible House for Sale"
1969	I Dream of Jeannie	General Whetherby	Season 5 Episode 5: "Jeannie's Beauty Cream"
1970	Hogan's Heroes	General von Schlomm	Season 6 Episode 4: "Lady Chitterly's Lover: Part 1"
1970	Hogan's Heroes	General von Schlomm	Season 6 Episode 5: "Lady Chitterly's Lover: Part 2"
1971	Columbo	Agent Carlson	Episode: "Ransom for a Dead Man"
1971	The Mod Squad	Lester Chennery	Season 4 Episode 12: "Real Loser"
1971	A Death of Innocence	Alexander Weisberg	TV movie
1971	Cannon	Nicholas Troas	Season 1 Episode 9: "A Lonely Place to Die"
1972	Love, American Style	Howard Cunningham	Season 3 Episode 22: "Love and the Happy Days"/"Love and the Newscasters" (segment "Love and the Television Set")
1972	The Mary Tyler Moore Show	Martin Morgenstern	Season 3 Episode 4: "Enter Rhoda's Parents"
1972	The Streets of San Francisco	Arthur Lavery	Season 1 Episode 9: "The Takers"
1972	Hawaii Five-O	Honore Vashon	Season 5 Episode 9: "'V' for Vashon: The Son"
1972	Hawaii Five-O	Honore Vashon	Season 5 Episode 10: "'V' for Vashon: The Father"
1972	Hawaii Five-O	Honore Vashon	Season 5 Episode 11: "'V' for Vashon: The Patriarch"
1973	Cannon	Robert L. Jardine	Season 2 Episode 20: "Prisoners"
1973	The Mary Tyler Moore Show	Martin Morgenstern	Season 4 Episode 3: "Rhoda's Sister Gets Married"
1973	The Partridge Family	Walter Yost	Season 4 Episode 3: "Beethoven, Brahms and Partridge"
1973	Ironside	Martin Geller	Season 7 Episode 5: "The Armageddon Gang"
1973	Needles and Pins	Joe	Season 1 Episode 6: "Union Trouble"
1973	Lotsa Luck	Martin Wicker	Season 1 Episode 6: "Mom's Secret"
1974	Gunsmoke	Colonel Lucius Shindrow	Season 20 Episode 3: "The Guns of Cibola Blanca: Part 1"
1974	Gunsmoke	Colonel Lucius Shindrow	Season 20 Episode 4: "The Guns of Cibola Blanca: Part 2"
1974	The Streets of San Francisco	Joseph Francis	Season 2 Episode 23: "Death and the Favored Few"
1974	Petrocelli	Haskell Fox	Season 1 Episode 6: "Death in High Places"
1974	Petrocelli	Haskell Fox	Season 1 Episode 8: "Mirror, Mirror on the Wall..."
1974	Police Story	Andrea Basic	Season 2 Episode 4: "Fathers and Sons"
1974–1978	Rhoda	Martin Morgenstern	17 episodes
1975	Cannon	Colonel Mirza	Season 4 Episode 23: "Tomorrow Ends at Noon"
1975	Hawaii Five-O	Honore Vashon	Season 8 Episode 6: "The Case Against McGarrett"
1976–1977	The Feather and Father Gang	TV series (co-starring Stefanie Powers) as Harry Danton	14 episodes
1976	Petrocelli	Haskell Fox	Season 2 Episode 21: "Shadow of a Doubt"
1976	Police Story	Sam Grossman	Season 3 Episode 20: "Eamon Kinsella Royce"
1977	Police Story	Emmett Parnell	Season 4 Episode 16: "The Blue Fog"
1977	Soap	Barney Gerber	4 episodes (Season 1 Episodes 9, 10, 11, 12)
1977	Family	Paul Schiller	Season 3 Episode 2: "Acts of Love: Part 2"
1979	The Rockford Files	Mr. Brockelman	Season 5 Episode 19: "Never Send a Boy King to Do a Man's Job"
1979	11th Victim	Benny Benito	TV movie
1979	The Man in the Santa Claus Suit	Dickie Dayton	TV movie
1980	Kenny Rogers as The Gambler	Arthur Stowbridge	TV movie
1980	The Scarlett O'Hara War	Louis B. Mayer	TV movie
1980	King Crab	Mr. Campana	TV movie
1983	Kenny Rogers as The Gambler: The Adventure Continues	Arthur Stowbridge	TV movie
1984	St. Elsewhere	Melvin Millstein	Season 3 Episode 9: "Up on the Roof"
1984	St. Elsewhere	Melvin Millstein	Season 3 Episode 10: "Girls Just Want to Have Fun"
1984	Webster	Walnutto	Season 2 Episode 3 "The Great Walnutto"
1985	The Golden Girls	Arnie Peterson, Rose's boyfriend	Season 1 Episode 3: "Rose the Prude"
1986	Mrs. Delafield Wants to Marry	Dr. Marvin Elias	TV movie
1986	Scarecrow and Mrs. King	Andrei Zernov	Season 3 Episode 13: "One Bear Dances, One Bear Doesn't"
1986	L.A. Law	Harry Finneman	Season 1 Episode 5: "Simian Chanted Evening"
1986	Night Court	Walter Wise	Season 4 Episode 11: "New Year's Leave"
1989	Empty Nest	Dr. Stanfield Weston	Season 1 Episode 19: "Man of the Year"
1989	Midnight Caller	Charlie Drexol	Season 1 Episode 17: "Blues for Mr. Charlie"
1989	The Ray Bradbury Theater	Old Man	Season 3 Episode 9: "To the Chicago Abyss"
1989	Get Smart Again	Nicholas Demente	TV movie
1989–1992	The Golden Girls	Miles Webber, Rose's boyfriend	(Seasons 5-7) (12 episodes)
1990	Dallas	Dr. Wexler	Season 13 Episode 26: "Three, Three, Three: Part 1"
1990	Dallas	Dr. Wexler	Season 13 Episode 27: "Three, Three, Three: Part 2"
1990	Singer & Sons	Nathan Singer	4 episodes
1992	The Ray Bradbury Theater	Colonel Stonesteel	Season 5 Episode 4: "Colonel Stonesteel and the Desperate Empties"
1992	The Golden Palace	Miles Webber, Rose's ex-boyfriend	Season 1 Episode 3: "Miles, We Hardly Knew Ye"
1993	The Golden Palace	Miles Webber, Rose's ex-boyfriend	Season 1 Episode 13: "Rose and Fern"
1994	Lois & Clark: The New Adventures of Superman	Edwin Griffin	Season 2 Episode 4: "The Prankster"
1995	Lois & Clark: The New Adventures of Superman	Edwin Griffin	Season 2 Episode 15: "The Return of the Prankster"
1996	The Outer Limits	Gerry	Season 2 Episode 17: "Paradise"
1996	For Hope	David 'Dave' Altman	TV movie
1996	Touched by an Angel	Sam Moskowitz	Season 3 Episode 5: "Written in Dust"
1997	The Love Bug	Dr. Gustav Stumpfel	TV movie
1998	Felicity	Dr. William Garibay	Season 1 Episode 3: "Hot Objects"
1999	Pacific Blue	Judge Solomon Stein	Season 5 Episode 6: "Hostile Witness"
2000	The King of Queens	Irv Glassman	Season 2 Episode 19: "Surprise Artie"
2001	Touched by an Angel	Albert Einstein	Season 7 Episode 22: "The Face of God"
2003	Judging Amy	Arthur	Season 4 Episode 15: "Maxine Interrupted"
2008	Cold Case	Monty Moran '08	Season 6 Episode 9: "Pin Up Girl"
2010	Nip/Tuck	Walter Krieger	Season 6 Episode 18: "Walter and Edith Krieger"

=== Theatre ===
- The House of Blue Leaves (1970) – Artie Shaughnessy – Truck and Warehouse Theatre, New York City, NY
- The Skin of Our Teeth (1983) – Mr. Antrobus – Old Globe Theatre, San Diego, CA
- The Substance of Fire (1996) – Isaac Geldhart – Old Globe Theater, San Diego, CA
- Visiting Mr. Green (1999) – Mr. Green – Pasadena Playhouse
- Old Wicked Songs (2002) – Professor Josef Mashkan – Rubicon Theatre Company
- Tuesdays with Morrie (2005) – Morrie Schwartz – Rubicon Theatre Company
