= Jill Haworth =

English-American actress (1945–2011)

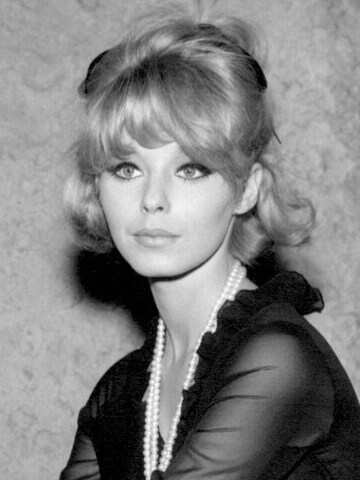
- A guest appearance on The Rogues (1965)
- Born: Valerie Jill Haworth; 15 August 1945; Hove, East Sussex, England
- Died: 3 January 2011 (aged 65); New York, New York, U.S.
- Resting place: Kensico Cemetery, Valhalla, New York
- Occupation: Actress
- Years active: 1960–2011

Valerie Jill Haworth (15 August 1945 – 3 January 2011) was an English-American actress. She appeared in films throughout the 1960s, and started making guest appearances on television in 1963. She originated the role of Sally Bowles in the musical Cabaret on Broadway in 1966.

== Early life ==
Haworth was born in Hove, East Sussex, to a textile magnate father. Her mother Nancy had trained as a ballet dancer. The girl was named Valerie Jill in honour of being born on Victory over Japan Day, or V.J. Day, during World War II. After her parents separated in 1953, she took ballet lessons at the Sadler's Wells Ballet School to escape from an unhappy home. Later she attended the Corona Stage School.

== Career ==
Haworth's first film appearance was in the 1959 English remake of The 39 Steps, directed by Ralph Thomas, when she had a non-speaking part as a schoolgirl. Next she played a schoolgirl in The Brides of Dracula (1960), directed by Terence Fisher.

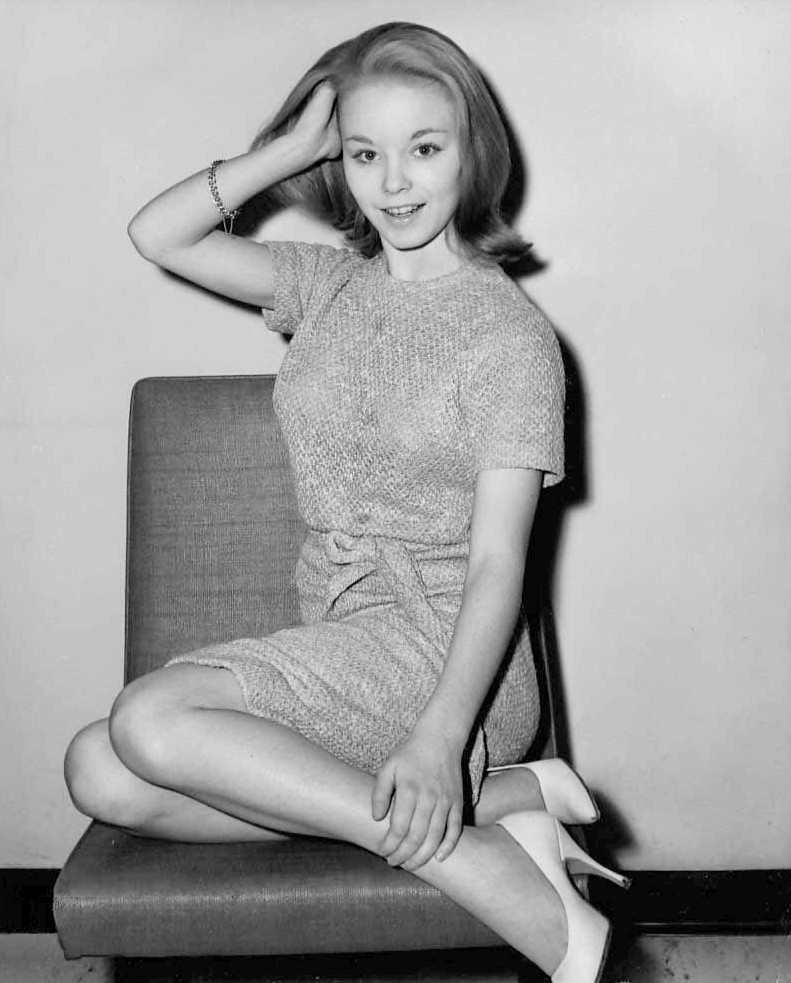
Haworth at 16 in 1961

American director Otto Preminger was seeking a new fresh face for the role of Karen Hansen in his planned film "Exodus". She was a Danish-Jewish refugee in love with Dov Landau (Sal Mineo); both were immigrants to Palestine. Preminger travelled to Britain and Germany, with his fiancée Hope Bryce, searching for a girl to cast in the role. After looking at hundreds of girls, Preminger spotted a photo of Haworth in a modelling magazine for the Corona Theatre School.

Haworth went to three auditions, initially in order to get out of school. She was 15 years old when she was cast as Karen Hansen, her first credited role in a feature film. Haworth was profiled in the 31 July 1960 issue of Parade magazine. She and Mineo were featured on the front cover of the 12 December 1960 issue of LIFE, part of a photo essay by Gjon Mili.

She and her mother moved to the United States when she gained a five-year contract to Preminger. She worked again with Preminger in The Cardinal (1963), where she played Lalage Menton, and in In Harm's Way (1965), as Ensign Annalee Dorne, a Nurse Corps officer. While engaged to Ensign Jeremiah Torrey (Brandon deWilde), she is raped by Captain Paul Eddington Jr. (Kirk Douglas) and commits suicide. Haworth said she liked working with De Wilde, Patricia Neal, and Douglas, but described the star John Wayne as "the meanest, nastiest man with the worst attitude I ever worked with." Wayne's costars didn't share her opinion.

Preminger insisted that Haworth live in New York City to become Americanized; he did not want her living in Los Angeles for fear she would become a "starlet a-go-go". She was approached to play the titular character Dolores "Lolita" Haze in Lolita (1962) with James Mason, but Preminger vetoed the idea, as he didn't think it would be good for her as an actor.

Mineo and Haworth were considered together for the film David and Lisa (1962), but once again Preminger refused permission. Preminger did let her make three French films; Les Mystères de Paris (as Fleur de Marie; 1962), Because, Because of a Woman (as Cécilia; 1963), and Ton ombre est la mienne (as Sylvie "Devi" Bergerat; 1963).

Haworth co-starred alongside David McCallum in the Outer Limits episode, "The Sixth Finger" (1963). She later had a nonspeaking role as an extra in The Greatest Story Ever Told (1965).

She made four appearances on the television programme 12 O'Clock High in 1964 and 1965. In the episode "The Sound of Distant Thunder," she played an English girl, Mary, who falls in love with Lieutenant Andy Lathrop (played by Peter Fonda). The same season, she played a deaf girl, Nora Burgess, in an episode entitled "To Heinie with Love". She played Lieutenant Fay Vendry in two episodes, "Runway in the Dark" (1965) and "The Hotshot."

In 1965, she appeared in an episode of The Rogues entitled "Mr. White's Christmas" as Timothea, and really loved working with David Niven and Charles Boyer. She appeared in one of the final episodes of the series Rawhide, "Duel at Daybreak", as Vicki Woodruff, alongside co-actors Clint Eastwood and Charles Bronson. Haworth hurt her back in an accident on the set when she jumped from a runaway buggy and team of horses. After standing waist-deep in a manmade pond for six hours in order to complete retakes, she developed pneumonia and was bedridden for two months.

She starred in several horror films: It! (1967), The Haunted House of Horror (1969), Tower of Evil (1972), Home for the Holidays (1972), and The Mutations (1974). She took a part in It! only for the money, hated her hair in the film, and hated the film altogether. Haworth liked working with Roddy McDowall. Later he brought her the poster for the film (on her opening night of Cabaret), and wrote "S-h" in front of the title.

While filming It! she met Hal Prince, who was doing research for a musical based on Goodbye to Berlin by Christopher Isherwood. Prince asked her if she could sing, to which she responded, "Louder than Merman." She played Sally Bowles in the original Broadway cast of the 1966 musical Cabaret and, with its success, performed the part for almost two and a half years. Judi Dench took over the role when the production debuted on the West End in London in 1968.

Haworth's other stage roles included Bedroom Farce and Butterflies Are Free.

Haworth turned down working on Hawaii Five-O because of star Jack Lord's reputation for being a hard-driving perfectionist.

== Personal life ==
While making Exodus, Haworth became friends, first, and then lovers, with Sal Mineo. They were briefly engaged and, after separating, remained friends until his death in 1976. She later told author Michael Michaud that she thought Courtney Burr III, Haworth's close friend and Mineo's long-term partner, was the "love of Mineo's life."

Haworth dated television producer Aaron Spelling in the summer of 1965, when he was 42 and she was 19. Spelling reportedly told friends that he hoped that Haworth would be the next Mrs. Spelling, but Haworth's mother, Nancy, reportedly "scoffed" at the idea. Mineo objected, saying Spelling was too old for Haworth.

== Later life and death ==
Haworth and her mother shared a place on New York City's Upper East Side for many years. Before her death, she and Courtney Burr III contributed to Michael Gregg Michaud's biography on Mineo, and the book was dedicated in their honor. She died of natural causes at the age of 65 on 3 January 2011 in Manhattan. She is buried at Kensico Cemetery.

== Filmography ==
=== Film ===
Year	Title	Role	Notes
1959	The 39 Steps	Schoolgirl on Train	Uncredited
1960	The Brides of Dracula	Schoolgirl	Uncredited
1960	Exodus	Karen Hansen Clement	Nominated – Golden Globe Award for Most Promising Newcomer
1962	The Mysteries of Paris	Fleur de Marie	
1963	Because, Because of a Woman	Cécilia	
1963	Ton ombre est la mienne	Sylvie 'Devi' Bergerat	
1963	The Cardinal	Lalage Menton	
1965	In Harm's Way	Ensign Annalee Dohrn, NC, USNR	
1967	It!	Ellen Grove	
1969	The Haunted House of Horror	Sheila	Also known as: Horror House
1969	The Ballad of Andy Crocker	Karen	ABC Movie of the Week
1972	Tower of Evil	Rose Mason	Also known as: Horror on Snape Island
1972	Home for the Holidays	Joanna Morgan	TV movie
1974	The Mutations	Lauren	
1981	Strong Medicine		
1988	Gandahar	Announcer	English version, Voice
2001	Mergers & Acquisitions	Mrs. Richards	(final film role)

=== Television ===
Year	Title	Role	Notes
1959	ITV Play of the Week	Nonny Lawrence	Episode: "Touch Wood"
1963	The Outer Limits	Cathy Evans	Episode: "The Sixth Finger"
1965	The Rogues	Timothea Farley	Episode: "Mr. White's Christmas"
1965	Burke's Law	Ambrosia Mellon	Episode: "Who Killed the Card"
1965	The Long, Hot Summer	Sharon	Episode: "Home is a Needless Place"
1964–65	12 O'Clock High	Various	4 episodes
1965	Run for Your Life	Judy Collins	Episode: "The Savage Season"
1965	Rawhide	Vicki Woodruff	Episode: "Duel at Daybreak"
1965–73	The F.B.I.	Sue Meadows / Lynn Anslem	2 episodes
1970	The Most Deadly Game	Lydia Grey	Episode: "Witches' Sabbath"
1971	Bonanza	Gillian Harwood	Episode: "The Reluctant American"
1971	Mission: Impossible	Enid Brugge / Marla Kassel	Episode: "My Friend, My Enemy"
1971	The Psychiatrist		Episode: "The Longer Trail"
1976	Baretta	Ginger Correlli	Episode: "Under the City"
1979	Vega$	Lily Baker	Episode: "The Eleventh Event"
