= Finnegan Begin Again =

American romantic comedy film

- VHS poster
- Genre: Comedy; Drama; Romance
- Written by: Walter Lockwood
- Directed by: Joan Micklin Silver
- Starring: Mary Tyler Moore; Robert Preston; Sam Waterston; Sylvia Sidney; David Huddleston
- Music by: David Sanborn
- Country of origin: United States
- Original language: English

Production
- Executive producer: Michael Deeley
- Producers: Jan Wieringa; Gower Frost
- Production location: Richmond, Virginia
- Cinematography: Robby Müller
- Editor: Jay Freund
- Running time: 111 minutes
- Production companies: Consolidated Productions; Jennie & Co. Zenith Productions; HBO Premiere Films

Original release
- Network: HBO
- Release: February 24, 1985

Finnegan Begin Again is a 1985 American made-for-HBO romantic comedy film directed by Joan Micklin Silver, shot by Robby Müller, and starring Mary Tyler Moore and Robert Preston. The movie was filmed in Richmond, Virginia, and premiered on HBO on February 24, 1985, before being released on video. The supporting cast features Sam Waterston and Sylvia Sidney.

== Plot ==
Michael Finnegan, a past-his-prime journalist, has been relegated to ghost-writing "Dear Felicity", a column for the lovelorn. He and his wife live in a decaying neighborhood. She is long despondent over the loss of their young son, and lives in a fantasy world. Despite these reversals, Finnegan retains his optimism; he knows that lives can start over, and over. He gets his own chance to begin again when one day on the bus, he meets Liz DeHaan, an art teacher who is having an affair with a married man.

== Cast ==
- Mary Tyler Moore as Liz DeHaan
- Robert Preston as Mike Finnegan
- Sam Waterston as Paul Broadbent
- Sylvia Sidney as Margaret Finnegan
- David Huddleston as Jack Archer
- Bob Gunton as Christian Jamison
- Giancarlo Esposito as Intruder
- Russell Horton as Mort
- Avery Brooks as Dude On Bus
- Peter Friedman as John Jewell
- Jon DeVries as Dr. Binder
- Rick Warner as Charlie DeWitt

== Home media ==
The film was released on VHS by Thorn EMI/HBO Video under license from Home Box Office, Inc. However, it has never released on DVD or Blu-ray. The film is frequently found on video on-demand and streaming platforms, including YouTube.
