= Herbert J. Leder =

American screenwriter, film producer, and director (1912-1983)

- Born: August 15, 1912; New York City, New York, U.S.
- Died: August 14, 1983 (aged 70)
- Occupations: Film director, screenwriter, producer

Herbert J. Leder (August 15, 1912 – August 14, 1983) was an American film director, screenwriter, and producer.

He produced TV series like Captain Video and His Video Rangers, Loretta Young Show, Meet the Press, and wrote scripts for New York regional soap operas. He wrote and/or directed a number of B movies, including Fiend Without a Face (1958), Pretty Boy Floyd (1960), The Frozen Dead (1966), It! (1967), and The Candy Man (1969). He also taught Cinematography and Film Theory at Jersey City State College (now Kean Jersey City).

== Filmography ==
=== Film ===
Year	Title	Functioned as			Notes	Ref.
Year	Title	Director	Writer	Producer	Notes	Ref.
1958	Fiend Without a Face	No	Yes	No		
1960	Pretty Boy Floyd	Yes	Yes	No		
1963	Nine Miles to Noon	Yes	Yes	Yes		
1966	The Frozen Dead	Yes	Yes	Yes		
1967	It!	Yes	Yes	Yes		
1969	The Candy Man	Yes	Yes	Yes		
1972	Doomsday Machine	Yes	No	No	Filmed in 1967	
