= Country Blue =

1973 film by Jack Conrad

- Theatrical release poster
- Directed by: Jack Conrad
- Written by: Jack Conrad; William Conrad
- Produced by: Emmett Alston; Jack Conrad
- Starring: Dub Taylor; Jack Conrad; Rita George; David Huddleston
- Cinematography: Emmett Alston
- Production companies: Millstone Productions, Inc.
- Release date: 1973
- Running time: 98 minutes
- Country: United States
- Language: English

Country Blue is a 1973 American independent romantic crime film cowritten and directed by Jack Conrad and starring Conrad, Dub Taylor, Rita George, and David Huddleston. The film was inspired by actual bank robberies which took place at a Farmers Merchant Bank.

== Production ==
Dub Taylor was quoted in a 1973 article in The Atlanta Journal as being perplexed that several audience members at a screening laughed during a scene which was meant to be serious, saying "I don't know why they did that. We'd screened it before and I've never heard this reaction." An unnamed film distributor reportedly called for the film to be shorter than the original 110-minute runtime.

Country Blue involved 3,000 miles of travel, at locations in Florida, Georgia, and several other locations. The film was partially inspired by Conrad's time studying at the University of Southern California, during which he read about robberies at the Farmers Bank of Malone, which the movie was loosely based on. Conrad was unable to secure the bank as a filming location, instead settling for another site.
