= John Fink =

American film and television actor

- Born: February 11, 1940 (age 86); Detroit, Michigan, U.S.
- Occupations: Film, television actor
- Years active: 1951–2007

John Fink (born February 11, 1940) is an American film and television actor.

He is known for his roles in two Batman movies, Batman Forever (1995) and Batman & Robin (1997), and his other film credits include Loving (1970), The Carey Treatment (1972), Home for the Holidays (1972), The Lindbergh Kidnapping Case (1976), Flatliners (1990), What's Love Got to Do with It (1993) and The Client (1994). He has also had minor roles in Saved by the Bell, Ally McBeal, McMillan & Wife, Columbo, and various other series since the 1970s.

While he was billed as a supporting actor in the 1978 Battlestar Galactica pilot, a majority of his scenes were cut, mainly because those scenes dealt with Serina's (Jane Seymour) "space cancer" B-story which had been excised from the final cut.

== Filmography ==
Year	Title	Role	Notes
1970	Loving	Brad	
1972	The Carey Treatment	Chief Surgeon Andrew Murphy	
1972	Home for the Holidays	Dr. Ted Lindsay	TV movie
1976	The Lindbergh Kidnapping Case	Mr. Anderson	TV movie
1976	The Waltons	Glen Oldfield	Season 5 Episode "The Last Mustang”
1978	Three's Company	Barry Gates	Episode “The Rivals”
1978	Battlestar Galactica	Dr. Paye	
1990	Flatliners	Doctor	
1990	The Bonfire of the Vanities	French Restaurant Patron No. 3	
1993	Falling Down	Guy Behind Woman Driver	
1993	What's Love Got to Do with It	Anna's Lawyer	
1994	The Client	Lieutenant	
1995	Batman Forever	Deputy	
1997	Batman & Robin	Aztec Museum Guard	
1998	BASEketball	Surgeon	
1999	Flawless	Gay Republican Lawyer	
1999	Starry Night	Alex Manners	
2002	Bad Company	Officer Fink	
2007	The Number 23	Young Walter's Father / Young Fingerling's Father	(final film role)
