= Anna Palk =

English actress (1941–1990)

- Born: 23 October 1941; Looe, Cornwall, England
- Died: 1 July 1990 (aged 48); London, England
- Occupation: Actress
- Years active: 1961–1983

Anna Palk (23 October 1941 – 1 July 1990) was an English actress.

Born in Looe, Cornwall, Palk was educated at Rise Hall Convent in the East Riding of Yorkshire, then trained as an actress at the Royal Academy of Dramatic Art in London. She made her professional debut in August 1961, appearing in Lawrence Durrell's Sappho at the Edinburgh Festival, then gained repertory experience at Bristol, Leatherhead, Derby, Newcastle upon Tyne and Leeds. She spent a year in a major West End revival of Noël Coward's Present Laughter (1965–66), playing opposite Nigel Patrick and Phyllis Calvert, and subsequently appeared in the first UK production of David Mamet's Sexual Perversity in Chicago (1977–78).

Her film appearances included Play It Cool (1962), The Earth Dies Screaming (1964), The Skull (1965), Fahrenheit 451 (1966), The Frozen Dead (1966), The Nightcomers (1971) and Tower of Evil (1972). She also appeared on TV in such programmes as Sergeant Cork (1964), Witch Hunt (1967), as Sarah Courtney in The Main Chance (21 episodes, 1969–72: probably her best-known role), The Persuaders! (1971), Jason King (1971), The Protectors (1972), The New Avengers (1977), and Bognor (1981–82).

She died in 1990, of cancer, in London, England. According to her obituary in The Stage, in her final years she "concentrated on finding an alternative cure for cancer. This search took her to Peru, where in 1984 she made a film about her search for alternative cures. During all this time her husband Derek Brierley and their 16-year-old son, Jonathan, helped her wholeheartedly."

== Filmography ==
- Play It Cool (1962) as Ann Bryant
- The Earth Dies Screaming (1964) as Lorna
- The Skull (1965) as Maid
- Fahrenheit 451 (1966) as Jackie (uncredited)
- The Frozen Dead (1966) as Jean Norberg
- Mini Weekend (1968) as Girl in cinema
- The Nightcomers (1971) as New Governess
- Tower of Evil (1972) as Nora
