= Sheila Hocken =

Sheila Hocken is a writer and canine specialist. She is best known for her book Emma & I (1978), an autobiography that details her growing up as a blind child, her relationship with her chocolate Labrador Retriever guide dog, Emma, and the regaining of her sight as a young woman through surgery. Hocken and Emma go through many different obstacles together, both sad and happy. She had several jobs before she was cured and her books describe the difficulties in depth, raising awareness about blind people in each book. The 1984 TV film, Second Sight: A Love Story, starring Elizabeth Montgomery, is based on the book.

Hocken became actively involved in the canine world as a dog trainer in Nottingham, England.

== Books ==
- Emma and I (1978) ISBN 0-7089-0322-3
- Emma V.I.P. (1980) ISBN 0-575-02914-5
- Emma’s Story (1981) ISBN 0-575-02890-4
- Emma and Co. (1983) ISBN 0-85119-291-2
- Living with Dogs (1985) ISBN 0-575-03551-X
- After Emma (1988) ISBN 0-575-04255-9
- Emma Forever (1990) ISBN 0-575-04911-1
