= David Huddleston =

American actor (1930–2016)

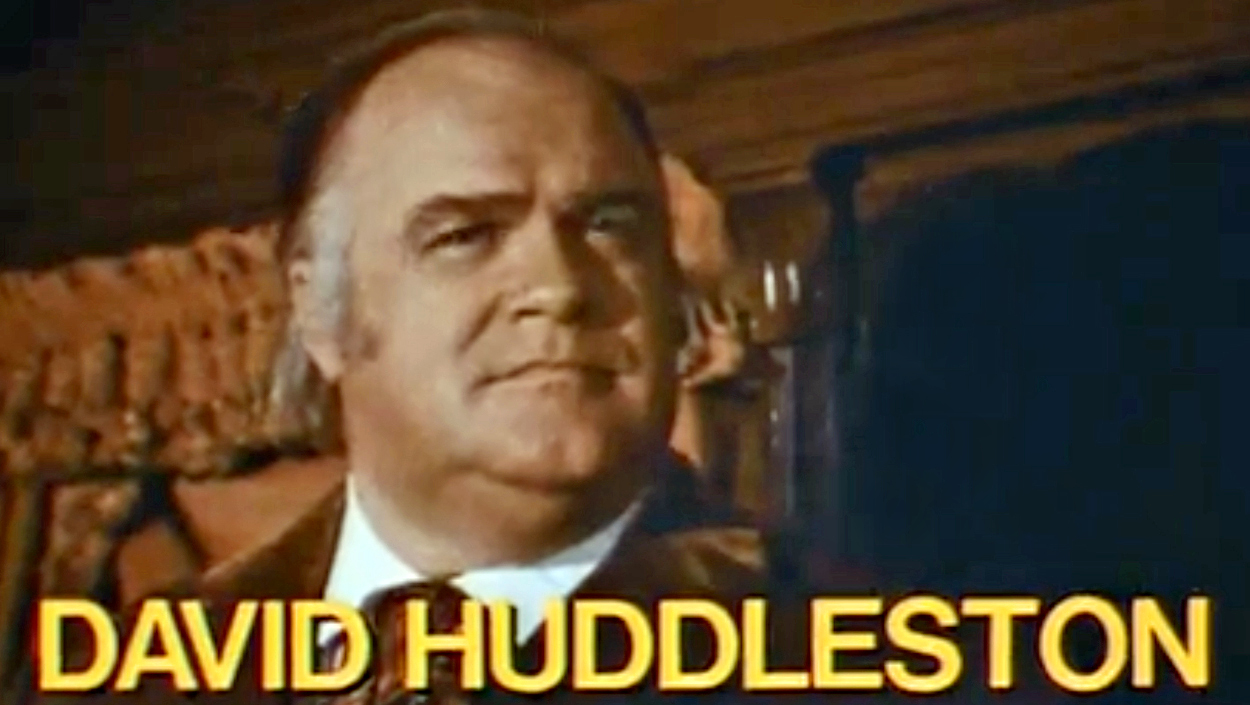
- Huddleston in trailer of Breakheart Pass (1975)
- Born: David William Huddleston; September 17, 1930; Vinton, Virginia, U.S.
- Died: August 2, 2016 (aged 85); Santa Fe, New Mexico, U.S.
- Education: American Academy of Dramatic Arts
- Occupations: Actor, writer
- Years active: 1960–2009
- Spouses: Rose Mary Petrillo (m. 1951, divorced) Carole Ann Swart (m. 1968; died 1987) Sarah Cornelia Koeppe (m. 1999)
- Children: 1
- Military career
- Allegiance: United States
- Branch: United States Air Force

David William Huddleston (September 17, 1930 – August 2, 2016) was an American actor. He had a prolific career as a character actor between 1960 and 2014, appearing in over 140 film and television productions, as well as playing the title character in both Santa Claus: The Movie (1985) and The Big Lebowski (1998). He was a Primetime Emmy Award nominee, and was also nominated for a Drama Desk Award for the Broadway play Death of a Salesman.

== Early life ==
Huddleston was born in Vinton, Virginia, in 1930, the son of Ismay Hope (née Dooley) and Lewis Melvin Huddleston. He attended Fork Union Military Academy for high school (postgraduate class of 1949), where he listed Villamont, Virginia, as his hometown, and he is listed among the school's prominent alumni. He was briefly an officer in the United States Air Force before beginning his formal education in acting at the American Academy of Dramatic Arts via the G.I. Bill.

== Career ==
=== Film ===
Known mainly as a character actor, Huddleston starred in the title role of 1985's big-budget film Santa Claus: The Movie, which featured a top-billed Dudley Moore as an elf. One of Huddleston's first roles came in the 1968 drama A Lovely Way to Die. Among Huddleston's notable feature-film credits prior to Santa Claus: The Movie are his co-starring roles in Blazing Saddles, McQ, The Klansman, Smokey and the Bandit II, and Breakheart Pass.

Huddleston's post-Santa Claus: The Movie career found him making occasional co-starring roles, in Finnegan Begin Again, Frantic, Life with Mikey, The Big Lebowski in which he played the title role, and G-Men from Hell. In 2009, he appeared in the thriller Locker 13. Huddleston was also featured in the 2010 special It's Always Sunny in Philadelphia: It's a Very Sunny Christmas released directly to DVD, Blu-ray, and digital download.

=== Television ===
Shortly after his film debut, the actor became a frequent guest star on several of the leading television series of the 1960s and 1970s, among them, Adam-12, Then Came Bronson, Gunsmoke, Bewitched, Bonanza, Columbo, Cannon, McMillan & Wife, The Waltons, The Rookies, Medical Center, Kung Fu, Emergency!, Spencer's Pilots, The Mary Tyler Moore Show, Police Woman, Hawaii Five-O, Walker, Texas Ranger, Charlie's Angels, Vega$, Sanford and Son, The Practice, and The Rockford Files. He appeared in many episodes of the TV series Petrocelli, as Lieutenant John Ponce during the series' run from 1974 to 1976. He appeared in an unaired episode of the short-lived 1974 series The New Land and in the episode "The Nomads" from the 1977 series Quinn Martin's Tales of the Unexpected (known in the United Kingdom as Twist in the Tale). He starred as J. T. Kallikak in the short-lived NBC situation comedy The Kallikaks later in 1977, and in 1979, he played the title role in the short-lived situation comedy Hizzonner as a small-town mayor.

Huddleston resumed his television career with roles in various television movies, among them Heatwave! (1974), The Oregon Trail (1976), Shark Kill (1976), Kate Bliss and the Ticker Tape Kid (1978), Family Reunion (1981), Computercide (1982), and M.A.D.D.: Mothers Against Drunk Driving (1983). For much of the 1980s, Huddleston also starred in a series of television commercials for the Citrus Hill brand of orange juice. Later, he also had a recurring role as Albert "Gramps" Arnold, the paternal grandfather of the protagonist in The Wonder Years. Huddleston appeared on Star Trek: The Next Generation as the train conductor in the episode "Emergence". He also appeared twice on The West Wing as Max Lobell, a Republican Senator who allies with Jed Bartlet on the issue of campaign finance reform.

=== Theatre ===
Among his Broadway theatre roles, Huddleston starred in productions of The First (1981), Death of a Salesman (1984), Abe Lincoln in Illinois (1993-94), and as Benjamin Franklin in 1776 (1997-98). His performance as Franklin in a later Boston run of 1776 is referenced in the book Assassination Vacation by Sarah Vowell, referring to him as "the actor who played the Big Lebowski in The Big Lebowski." For his portrayal of Charley in Death of a Salesman, he was nominated for a Drama Desk Award for Outstanding Featured Actor in a Play in 1984.

Huddleston also appeared in touring productions of The Music Man, Mame, and A Funny Thing Happened on the Way to the Forum.

== Personal life ==
Huddleston was married three times. At the time of his passing, he was married to casting director Sarah Koeppe.

=== Death ===
On August 2, 2016, Huddleston died of heart and kidney disease in Santa Fe, New Mexico, at the age of 85.

== Filmography ==
=== Features ===
- 1963 All the Way Home, uncredited
- 1964 Black Like Me
- 1968 A Lovely Way to Die as Man In Bar (uncredited)
- 1969 Slaves as Holland
- 1970 WUSA as Heavy Man (uncredited)
- 1970 Norwood as Uncle Lonnie
- 1970 Rio Lobo as Dr. Ivor Jones, Dentist
- 1971 Fools' Parade as Homer Grindstaff
- 1971 Something Big as Malachi Morton
- 1971 Brian's Song (TV movie) as Ed McCaskey
- 1971 The Homecoming: A Christmas Story (TV movie) as Sheriff Ep Bridges
- 1972 Bad Company as Joe "Big Joe"
- 1973 Country Blue as Angus Wages
- 1974 McQ as Edward "Pinky" Farrow
- 1974 Heatwave! (TV movie) as Arnold Brady
- 1974 Blazing Saddles as Olson Johnson
- 1974 Billy Two Hats as Copeland, Saloon Owner
- 1974 Nightmare Honeymoon as Pete Carroll
- 1974 The Klansman as Mayor Hardy Riddle
- 1975 Breakheart Pass as Dr. Molyneux
- 1976 Sherlock Holmes in New York (TV movie) as NYPD Inspector Lafferty
- 1977 Crime Busters as Captain McBride
- 1977 The Greatest as Cruikshank
- 1977 Capricorn One as Congressman Hollis Peaker
- 1977 The World's Greatest Lover as Bakery Owner
- 1978 Zero to Sixty as Harold Finch
- 1980 Gorp as "Walrus" Wallman
- 1980 Smokey and the Bandit II as John Conn
- 1983 The Act as Corky
- 1983 Go for It as "Tiger"
- 1985 Finnegan Begin Again (TV movie) as Jack Archer
- 1985 Santa Claus: The Movie as Santa Claus
- 1988 Frantic as Peter
- 1988 The Tracker (TV movie) as Lane Crawford
- 1989 Margaret Bourke-White (TV movie) as Bemis
- 1990 Columbo Cries Wolf (TV movie) as The Mayor
- 1993 Life with Mikey as Mr. Corcoran
- 1994 Cultivating Charlie as Ed Thundertrunk
- 1995 Something to Talk About as Jack "Mad Dog" Pierce (uncredited)
- 1996 Joe's Apartment as P.I. Smith
- 1997 The Man Next Door as Sheriff Dawkins
- 1998 The Big Lebowski as Jeffrey "The Big" Lebowski
- 2000 G-Men from Hell as Dr. Boifford
- 2005 The Producers as Judge
- 2007 Postal as Peter
- 2009 Saving Grace B. Jones as Radio Announcer (voice)
- 2009 Locker 13 as Floyd (segment "story #2") (final film role)

=== Television ===
- 1969 Adam-12 (episode — Log 63: Baby) as Station Attendant
- 1969 Then Came Bronson (episode — Your Love Is Like a Demolition Derby in My Heart) as "Bear" Hudson
- 1970 Bewitched (episode — Samantha's Pet Warlock) as Dog Pound Attendant (1970)
- 1971 Bewitched (episode — Out of the Mouths of Babes) as Sean Flanagan
- 1971 Bonanza (episode — Bushwacked) as Doc Scully
- 1971 Cannon (episode — Country Blues) as Jimmy Winters
- 1971 Bewitched (episode — The Return of Darrin the Bold) as Dave
- 1971 McMillan & Wife (episode — Murder by the Barrel) as Pylant
- 1971 Gunsmoke (episode — Lavery) as Arno
- 1971 Ironside (episode — The Priest Killer) as Harrison Davis
- 1971 The Waltons (Pilot) as Sheriff Ep Bridges
- 1972 Bonanza (episode — The Hidden Enemy) as Myles Johnson
- 1972 The Waltons (episode — The Literary Man) as A.J. Covington
- 1973 The New Dick Van Dyke Show (episode — He Who Steals My Friends) as Gordon
- 1973 Tenafly (episode — The Cash and Carry Caper)
- 1973 Tenafly (episode — Pilot) as Lieutenant Sam Church
- 1973 The New Perry Mason (episode — The Case of the Deadly Deeds) as Stephen Elder
- 1973 Hawkins (episode — Death and the Maiden) as Joseph Harrelson
- 1973 Kung Fu (episode — The Salamander) as Nathaniel
- 1973 Gunsmoke (episode — The Widowmaker) as Dad Goodpastor
- 1974 The Mary Tyler Moore Show (episode — What Are Friends For?) as Freddy
- 1974 The Snoop Sisters (episode — A Black Day for Bluebeard) as Arwin Shanks
- 1974 Gunsmoke (episode — In Performance of Duty) as Emmett
- 1974 Gunsmoke (episode — The Disciple) as Asa
- 1974 Ironside (episode — Come Eleven, Come Twelve) as Smithers
- 1974 Paper Moon (episode — Impostor) as Sheriff
- 1974-1976 Petrocelli (9 episodes) as Lieutenant John Ponce
- 1975 The Rockford Files (episode — The Reincarnation of Angie) as Sherm
- 1975 Police Woman (episode — The Purge) as Milton Brooks
- 1975 Emergency! (episode — 905-Wild) as Barney "Doc" Coolidge
- 1975 Kung Fu (episode — One Step to Darkness) as Shelby Cross
- 1976 Barnaby Jones (episode — Jules Takes a Partner) as Dr. Michael Harrigan
- 1976 Once an Eagle (TV mini-series) as Earl Preis
- 1976 Spencer's Pilots (episode — The Explosives) as Willie Hunt
- 1976 Charlie's Angels (episode — Angels in Chains) as Sheriff Clint
- 1976 Hawaii Five-O (episode — Love Thy Neighbor, Take His Wife) as Vincent Rhoads
- 1976 Sanford and Son (episodes — The Hawaiian Connection: Parts 1 & 2) as First Cop
- 1977 Barnaby Jones (episode — Copy-Cat Killing) as Sheriff Roland G. Bradden
- 1977 The Kallikaks (SitCom) as Jasper T. Kallikak
- 1977-1978 How the West Was Won (TV mini-series — episodes — #1.1- #1.4) as Christy Judson
- 1979 Vega$ (episode — Mixed Blessings) as Jim "Diamond Jim" O'Neal
- 1980 Benson (Sitcom — Season One, episode 20) as "Old Man" Gatling
- 1982 Trapper John, M.D. (episode — Truth and Consequences: Parts 1 & 2) as Wallace Surtees
- 1985 Magnum, P.I. (episode — Going Home) as Frank Peterson
- 1986 Spot Marks the X Disney Sunday Movie as Doc Ross
- 1986 Blacke's Magic (episode — Breathing Room - Pilot) as Edgar Sheridan
- 1987 J.J. Starbuck (episode — Pilot) as "Bullets"
- 1990 Columbo (episode — Columbo Cries Wolf) as The Mayor
- 1990 Murder, She Wrote (episode — Good-Bye Charlie) as Sheriff Ed Ten Eyck
- 1990-1992 The Wonder Years (4 episodes) as Grandpa Arnold
- 1992 Lucky Luke (1 episode) as Ben Landon
- 1991 In a Child's Name (TV mini-series) as Zach Taylor
- 1994 Star Trek: The Next Generation (episode — Emergence) as The Conductor
- 1994 Walker, Texas Ranger (episode — The Road to Black Bayou) as Ferris Clayton
- 1998 The Great Christmas Movies (TV movie documentary) as Himself
- 2000 The West Wing — (episode — Lies, Damn Lies and Statistics) as Senator Max Lobell, R
- 2000, 2001 Gilmore Girls (2 episodes) as Mayor Harry Porter
- 2002 The West Wing (episode — Posse Comitatus) as Senator Max Lobell, R
- 2005 Best Ever Christmas Films (TV movie documentary) as Himself
- 2007 Andy Barker, P.I. (episode — Dial M for Laptop) as George Bender
- 2007 Jericho as Mayor Eric Green (flashbacks only)
- 2009 It's Always Sunny in Philadelphia (episode — A Very Sunny Christmas) as Eugene Hamilton

== Stage appearances (partial) ==
Year	Title	Role	Venue	Notes	Ref.
1962	The Music Man	Charlie Cowell	US tour		
1963-64	A Funny Thing Happened on the Way to the Forum	Prologus/Pseudolus	US tour	Standby	
1968	Woman Is My Idea	Bascombe	Belasco Theatre, New York		
1967-68	Mame	Mr. Upson	US tour		
1980	The Roast	Denver Cody	Winter Garden Theatre, New York		
1981	The First	Branch Rickey	Martin Beck Theater, New York		
1984	Death of a Salesman	Charley	Broadhurst Theatre, New York		
1988	The Resistible Rise of Arturo Ui	Old Dogsborough	Williamstown Theatre Festival, Williamstown		
1991	Inherit the Wind	Matthew Harrison Brady	Williamstown Theatre Festival, Williamstown		
1993-94	Abe Lincoln in Illinois	Judge Bowling Green	Vivian Beaumont Theater, New York		
1997-98	1776	Benjamin Franklin	Gershwin Theatre, New York	Replacement	
2003	1776	Benjamin Franklin	Ford's Theatre, Washington D.C.		

== Awards and nominations ==
Institution	Year	Category	Work	Result	Ref.
Golden Boot Awards	2002	—N/a	—N/a	Won	
Drama Desk Awards	1984	Outstanding Featured Actor in a Play	Death of a Salesman	Nominated	
Primetime Emmy Awards	1990	Outstanding Guest Actor in a Comedy Series	The Wonder Years ("The Powers That Be")	Nominated	
