= Purple Hearts Reunited =

- Formation: July 23, 2012
- Founder: Zachariah L. Fike
- Type: 501(c)(3)
- Purpose: Return of Purple Heart and other military awards to recipients or their families
- Location: St. Albans, Vermont
- Executive Director: Sarah M. Corry (Since 2016, current as of August 2018)
- Website: purpleheartsreunited.org

Purple Hearts Reunited is a Vermont-based 501(c)(3) organization. Founded in 2012, its purpose is to return Purple Hearts and other military awards that have become separated from the original recipients or their descendants. In circumstances where the original recipient has died and no descendants can be located, Purple Hearts Reunited arranges to donate awards to suitable organizations, including museums.

== Purpose ==
Established in 2012 as 501 (c)(3) nonprofit foundation, Purple Hearts Reunited (PHR) works to return lost or stolen medals to recipients or their family at no cost to them. When possible, PHR conducts a ceremony to formally place the medal back in the hands of the recipient or family. In situations where a recipient or family member cannot be located, PHR works to identify a suitable alternative, such as a military museum.

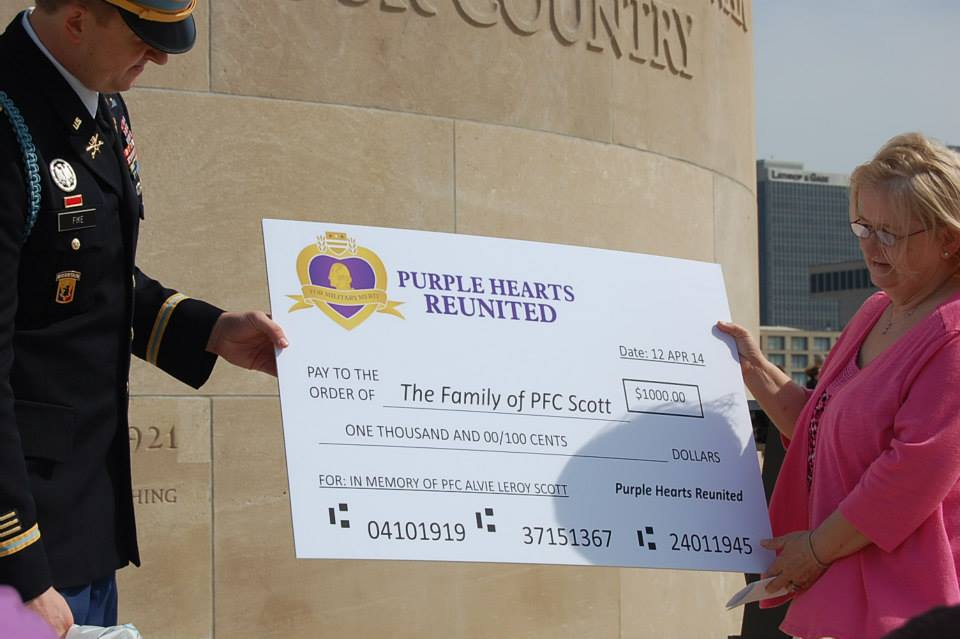
Zachariah Fike presenting a scholarship award to the family of Private First Class Alvie Scott in 2014

In circumstances where the recipient of a returned Purple Heart has not been included in the Purple Heart Hall of Honor, PHR ensures that the individual's name is added; As of March 2018, PHR has enrolled over 1,500 recipients. Through early 2018, PHR staff and volunteers have returned more than 400 medals to the original recipients or to their families. Purple Hearts Reunited's programs also include memorial educational scholarships and a memorial monument campaign.

== History ==
In 2009, Zachariah Fike, an officer in the Vermont Army National Guard with service in Operation Iraqi Freedom and Operation Enduring Freedom, received as a gift a Purple Heart his mother had purchased at an antique shop in Watertown, New York. His parents both served in the United States Army, and Fike is a Purple Heart recipient, so he was inspired to attempt returning the medal to the family of its original owner. He set the task aside while deployed to Afghanistan in 2009 and 2010, during which he was wounded and received the Purple Heart himself.

After returning to the United States in 2010, Fike took up the task of returning his 2009 Christmas gift to its original owner or his family. After returning the medal to the sister of the original recipient, a World War II veteran, Fike's subsequent research revealed numerous Purple Hearts and other medals available for sale or trade through online auction sites, at antique stores, flea markets, and pawnshops, and through other sources. He began acquiring as many as he could, attempting to track down the recipients or their families, and returning the awards whenever possible.

As the public became aware of Fike's efforts through media coverage of medal returns, he began to receive medals unsolicited from individuals who wanted them to be returned to the recipients or their families. These medals were often found in storage lockers, basements and attics, in boxes of clothing donated to Goodwill stores, and even in garbage cans. In 2012, Fike formalized his medal return efforts through the creation of the Purple Hearts Reunited organization.

== Media coverage ==
Purple Hearts Reunited return ceremonies are often covered by local and national news media. Individuals representing the organization have appeared on well-known programs including Fox & Friends.

In February 2015, the Purple Hearts Reunited mission was the subject of a story in Reader's Digest, "This Is Why Zach Fike Reunites Purple Hearts With Soldiers Who Lost Them". In December 2016, Purple Hearts reunited was the subject of a BBC feature story, "The Medal Detective". In January 2017, Purple Hearts Reunited was featured in an episode of American Pickers, "Catch-32".

The Purple Hearts Reunited mission was covered in David Isay's 2013 book The Ties That Bind and John C. Maxwell's 2015 book Intentional Living.

== Recognition ==
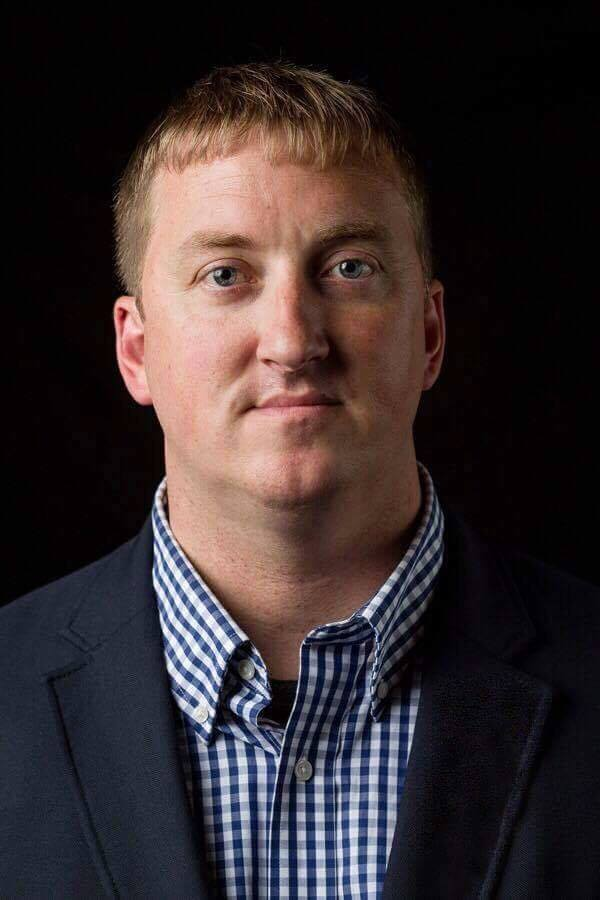
Zachariah Fike, founder of Purple Hearts Reunited

In 2016, Fike's efforts with Purple Hearts Reunited led to his selection as the Military Times Soldier of the Year.

== See also ==
- Purple Hearts Reunited on Facebook
- Purple Hearts Reunited on Twitter
- Purple Hearts Reunited on YouTube

== Sources ==
=== Magazines ===
- Kiener, Robert (February 26, 2015). "This Is Why Zach Fike Reunites Purple Hearts With Soldiers Who Lost Them". Reader's Digest. New York, NY: Trusted Media Brands, Inc.
- Kiener, Robert (March 21, 2018). "Reuniting Purple Hearts with Those Who 'Fought, Bled and Died'". VFW Magazine. Columbus, OH: Veterans of Foreign Wars.

=== Internet ===
- "Purple Hearts Returned to Families, Veteran". Fox & Friends on Twitter. New York, NY: Twitter.com. August 8, 2017.
- "2016 Soldier of the Year Winner: Capt. Zachariah Fike". smoy.militarytimes.com. Springfield, VA: Military Times. 2016.

=== News sites ===
- Lombardo, Tony (August 1, 2017). "Soldier Will Reunite Medal with Korea Vet's family on National Purple Heart Day". Military Times. Springfield, VA.
- Vibeke, Venema (December 21, 2016). "The Medal Detective". BBC. London, UK.
- WOOD-TV staff (July 10, 2018). "Grand Rapids: Purple Hearts Returned to WWII Soldiers' Families". WOOD-TV. Grand Rapids, MI.

=== Books ===
- Isay, Dave (2013). Ties That Bind. New York, NY: Penguin Books. ISBN 978-1-59420-517-0.
- Maxwell, John C. (2015). Intentional Living: Choosing A Life That Matters. New York, NY: Center Street. ISBN 978-1-4555-4817-0.
