= 1973–74 United States network television schedule =

The following is the 1973–74 network television schedule for the three major English language commercial broadcast networks in the United States. The schedule covers primetime hours from September 1973 through August 1974. The schedule is followed by a list per network of returning series, new series, and series cancelled after the 1972–73 season. All times are Eastern and Pacific, with certain exceptions, such as Monday Night Football.

New fall series are highlighted in bold.

Each of the 30 highest-rated shows is listed with its rank and rating as determined by Nielsen Media Research.

PBS, the Public Broadcasting Service, was in operation, but the schedule was set by each local station.

== Legend ==
- Gray indicates encore programming.
- Blue-gray indicates news programming.
- Light green indicates sporting events.
- Red indicates series being burned off and other regularly scheduled programs, including specials and movies.
- highlight Lime highlights indicates the number-one most watched program of the season.
- highlight Yellow highlights indicates the top-10 most watched programs of the season.
- highlight Cyan highlights indicates numbers 11-20 most watched programs of the season.
- highlight Magenta highlights indicates numbers 21-30 most watched programs of the season.
- highlight Highlights indicates that it falls in multiple of the above categories.

== Sunday ==
Network		7:30 PM	8:00 PM	8:30 PM	9:00 PM	9:30 PM	10:00 PM	10:30 PM
ABC		The F.B.I.		The ABC Sunday Night Movie (23/20.7) (Tied with Adam-12)				Local programming
CBS	Fall	**The New Perry Mason**		Mannix		Barnaby Jones (17/21.4) (Tied with Good Times)		Local programming
CBS	Winter	**Apple's Way**		Mannix		Barnaby Jones (17/21.4) (Tied with Good Times)		Local programming
CBS	Summer	**Apple's Way**		Mannix		60 Minutes		Local programming
NBC		The Wonderful World of Disney (12/22.3) (Tied with The Bob Newhart Show)		NBC Sunday Mystery Movie: Columbo / McCloud / McMillan and Wife / Hec Ramsey (14/22.2)				Local programming

Note: 60 Minutes aired at 6:00-7:00 pm on CBS from January to June 1974.

== Monday ==
Network		8:00 PM	8:30 PM	9:00 PM	9:30 PM	10:00 PM	10:30 PM
ABC	Fall	The Rookies (25/20.3)		Monday Night Football (19/21.2) (Tied with The CBS Friday Night Movie)			
ABC	Winter	The Rookies (25/20.3)		ABC Monday Movie (26/20.2)			
CBS		Gunsmoke (15/22.1)		Here's Lucy (29/20.0)	The New Dick Van Dyke Show	Medical Center	
NBC	Fall	**Lotsa Luck**	**Diana**	NBC Monday Night at the Movies			
NBC	Winter	**The Magician**		NBC Monday Night at the Movies			
NBC	Summer	The Baseball World of Joe Garagiola (8:00) / Monday Night Baseball (8:15)					

== Tuesday ==
Network		8:00 PM	8:30 PM	9:00 PM	9:30 PM	10:00 PM	10:30 PM
ABC	Fall	The New Temperatures Rising Show	ABC Tuesday Movie of the Week (21/21.0)			Marcus Welby, M.D.	
ABC	Winter	**Happy Days** (16/21.5)	ABC Tuesday Movie of the Week (21/21.0)			Marcus Welby, M.D.	
CBS		Maude (6/23.5)	Hawaii Five-O (5/24.0)		The New CBS Tuesday Night Movies: **Hawkins** / **Shaft**		
NBC	Fall	**Chase**		**The Magician**		**Police Story**	
NBC	Winter	Adam-12 (23/20.7) (Tied with The ABC Sunday Night Movie)	NBC Tuesday Mystery Movie: Banacek / **Tenafly** / **Faraday and Company** / **The Snoop Sisters**			**Police Story**	

== Wednesday ==
Network		8:00 PM	8:30 PM	9:00 PM	9:30 PM	10:00 PM	10:30 PM
ABC	Fall	**Bob & Carol & Ted & Alice**	ABC Wednesday Movie of the Week			Owen Marshall, Counselor at Law	
ABC	Late fall	**Dick Clark Presents the Rock and Roll Years**	ABC Wednesday Movie of the Week			Owen Marshall, Counselor at Law	
ABC	Winter	**The Cowboys**	ABC Wednesday Movie of the Week			**Doc Elliot**	
CBS	Fall	The Sonny & Cher Comedy Hour (7/23.3) (Tied with Kojak)		Cannon (9/23.1) (Tied with The Mary Tyler Moore Show)		**Kojak** (7/23.3) (Tied with The Sonny & Cher Comedy Hour)	
CBS	Summer	**The Bobbie Gentry Show**		Cannon (9/23.1) (Tied with The Mary Tyler Moore Show)		**Kojak** (7/23.3) (Tied with The Sonny & Cher Comedy Hour)	
CBS	Mid-summer	**Tony Orlando & Dawn**		Cannon (9/23.1) (Tied with The Mary Tyler Moore Show)		**Kojak** (7/23.3) (Tied with The Sonny & Cher Comedy Hour)	
CBS	August	**The Hudson Brothers Show**		Cannon (9/23.1) (Tied with The Mary Tyler Moore Show)		**Kojak** (7/23.3) (Tied with The Sonny & Cher Comedy Hour)	
NBC	Fall	Adam-12 (23/20.7) (Tied with The ABC Sunday Night Movie)	NBC Wednesday Mystery Movie: Banacek / **Tenafly** / **Faraday & Company** / **The Snoop Sisters**			**Love Story**	
NBC	Winter	**Chase**		NBC Wednesday Night at the Movies			

== Thursday ==
Network		8:00 PM	8:30 PM	9:00 PM	9:30 PM	10:00 PM	10:30 PM
ABC	Fall	**Toma**		Kung Fu (27/20.1) (Tied with The Carol Burnett Show)		The Streets of San Francisco (22/20.8)	
ABC	Winter	**Chopper One**	**Firehouse**	Kung Fu (27/20.1) (Tied with The Carol Burnett Show)		The Streets of San Francisco (22/20.8)	
ABC	Summer	Temperatures Rising	**Firehouse**	Kung Fu (27/20.1) (Tied with The Carol Burnett Show)		The Streets of San Francisco (22/20.8)	
ABC	Late summer	Temperatures Rising	**Just for Laughs**	Kung Fu (27/20.1) (Tied with The Carol Burnett Show)		The Streets of San Francisco (22/20.8)	
CBS		The Waltons (2/28.1)		CBS Thursday Night Movie (30/19.9)			
NBC	Fall	The Flip Wilson Show		Ironside		**NBC Follies**	
NBC	Winter	The Flip Wilson Show		Ironside		**Music Country USA**	
NBC	Summer	**The Mac Davis Show**		Ironside		**The Dean Martin Comedy World**	

== Friday ==
Network		8:00 PM	8:30 PM	9:00 PM	9:30 PM	10:00 PM	10:30 PM
ABC	Fall	The Brady Bunch	The Odd Couple	Room 222	**Adam's Rib**	Love, American Style	
ABC	Winter	The Brady Bunch	**The Six Million Dollar Man** (11/22.7)		The Odd Couple	**Toma**	
CBS	Fall	**Calucci's Department**	**Roll Out!**	The CBS Friday Night Movie (19/21.2) (Tied with Monday Night Football)			
CBS	Winter	**Dirty Sally**	**Good Times** (17/21.4) (Tied with Barnaby Jones)	The CBS Friday Night Movie (19/21.2) (Tied with Monday Night Football)			
CBS	Summer	**Your Hit Parade**	**Good Times** (17/21.4) (Tied with Barnaby Jones)	The CBS Friday Night Movie (19/21.2) (Tied with Monday Night Football)			
NBC	Fall	Sanford and Son (3/27.5)	**The Girl with Something Extra**	**Needles and Pins**	The Brian Keith Show*	The Dean Martin Show	
NBC	Winter	Sanford and Son (3/27.5)	**Lotsa Luck**	**The Girl with Something Extra**	The Brian Keith Show*	The Dean Martin Show	
NBC	Summer	Sanford and Son (3/27.5)	The Brian Keith Show* (R)	NBC Friday Night at the Movies			

(*) The Brian Keith Show had been titled The Little People during the 1972–73 season.

== Saturday ==
Network		8:00 PM	8:30 PM	9:00 PM	9:30 PM	10:00 PM	10:30 PM
ABC	Fall	The Partridge Family	**ABC Suspense Movie**			**Griff**	
ABC	Mid-winter	The Partridge Family	**ABC Suspense Movie**			Owen Marshall: Counselor at Law	
CBS	Fall	All in the Family (1/31.2)	M*A*S*H (4/25.7)	The Mary Tyler Moore Show (9/23.1) (Tied with Cannon)	The Bob Newhart Show (12/22.3) (Tied with The Wonderful World of Disney)	The Carol Burnett Show (27/20.1) (Tied with Kung Fu)	
CBS	Summer	All in the Family (1/31.2)	M*A*S*H (4/25.7)	The Mary Tyler Moore Show (9/23.1) (Tied with Cannon)	The Bob Newhart Show (12/22.3) (Tied with The Wonderful World of Disney)	Barnaby Jones	
NBC		Emergency!		NBC Saturday Night at the Movies			

== By network ==
=== ABC ===
**Returning Series**

- ABC Monday Movie
- ABC Movie of the Week
- The ABC Sunday Night Movie
- ABC Tuesday Movie of the Week
- ABC Wednesday Movie of the Week
- The Brady Bunch
- The F.B.I.
- Kung Fu
- Love, American Style
- Marcus Welby, M.D.
- Monday Night Football
- The Odd Couple
- Owen Marshall, Counselor at Law
- The Partridge Family
- The Rookies
- Room 222
- The Six Million Dollar Man
- The Streets of San Francisco
- Temperatures Rising

**New Series**

- **ABC Suspense Movie**
- **Adam's Rib**
- **Bob & Carol & Ted & Alice**
- **Chopper One** *
- **The Cowboys** *
- **Dick Clark Presents the Rock and Roll Years** *
- **Doc Elliot**
- **Firehouse** *
- **Griff**
- **Happy Days** *
- **Just for Laughs** *
- **Toma** *

Not returning from 1972–73:

- Alias Smith and Jones
- The Burns and Schreiber Comedy Hour
- The Corner Bar
- Here We Go Again
- The Julie Andrews Hour
- Love Thy Neighbor
- The Men: Assignment Vienna / The Delphi Bureau / Jigsaw
- The Mod Squad
- The Paul Lynde Show
- The Sixth Sense
- The Strauss Family
- Thicker than Water
- A Touch of Grace

=== CBS ===
**Returning Series**

- 60 Minutes
- All in the Family
- Barnaby Jones
- The Bob Newhart Show
- Cannon
- CBS Thursday Night Movie
- The Carol Burnett Show
- The New Dick Van Dyke Show
- Gunsmoke
- Hawaii Five-O
- Here's Lucy
- M*A*S*H
- Mannix
- The Mary Tyler Moore Show
- Maude
- Medical Center
- The New CBS Tuesday Night Movies
- The Sonny & Cher Comedy Hour
- The Waltons
- Your Hit Parade

**New Series**

- **Apple's Way** *
- **The Bobbie Gentry Show** *
- **Calucci's Department**
- **Dirty Sally** *
- **Good Times** *
- **Hawkins**
- **The Hudson Brothers Show** *
- **Kojak**
- **The New Perry Mason**
- **Roll Out**
- **Tony Orlando and Dawn** *

Not returning from 1972–73:

- Anna and the King
- Bridget Loves Bernie
- The Doris Day Show
- Mission: Impossible
- The New Bill Cosby Show
- The Sandy Duncan Show

=== NBC ===
**Returning Series**

- Adam-12
- Banacek
- The Brian Keith Show (formerly The Little People)
- Columbo
- The Dean Martin Show
- Emergency!
- The Flip Wilson Show
- Hec Ramsey
- Ironside
- The Magician
- McCloud
- McMillan & Wife
- Monday Night Baseball
- NBC Monday Night at the Movies
- The NBC Mystery Movie
- NBC Saturday Night at the Movies
- Sanford and Son
- The Wonderful World of Disney

**New Series**

- **Chase**
- **The Dean Martin Comedy World** *
- **Diana**
- **Faraday & Company**
- **The Girl with Something Extra**
- **Lotsa Luck**
- **Love Story**
- **The Mac Davis Show** *
- **The Magician**
- **Music Country USA** *
- **NBC Follies**
- **Needles and Pins**
- **Police Story**
- **The Snoop Sisters** *
- **Tenafly**

Not returning from 1972–73:

- Banyon
- The Bobby Darin Show
- The Bold Ones
- Bonanza
- Dean Martin Presents Music Country
- Escape
- First Tuesday
- Ghost Story/Circle of Fear
- The Helen Reddy Show
- Madigan
- NBC Reports
- Night Gallery
- Rowan & Martin's Laugh-In
- Search

Note: The * indicates that the program was introduced in midseason.
