= 1974–75 United States network television schedule =

The 1974–75 network television schedule for the three major English language commercial broadcast networks in the United States covers primetime hours from September 1974 through August 1975. The schedule is followed by a list per network of returning series, new series, and series cancelled after the 1973–74 season.

PBS, the Public Broadcasting Service, was in operation, but the schedule was set by each local station.

This is the last season in which the networks were limited to a 21-hour (three hours every day) weekly prime time schedule as mandated by the original Prime Time Access Rule enacted in September 1971. In January 1974, the FCC announced that it would relax the rulings for the fall season so that the networks could have four hours of nighttime programming on Sundays from 7 to 11 p.m., with two additional half-hours allocated for public affairs or family-oriented programming for the rest of the week. However, an injunction by syndicators forced the FCC to delay the changes by a year

New series are highlighted in bold.

All times are U.S. Eastern and Pacific Time (except for some live sports or events). Subtract one hour for Central, Mountain, Alaska and Hawaii–Aleutian times.

Each of the 30 highest-rated shows is listed with its rank and rating as determined by Nielsen Media Research.

== Legend ==
- Light blue indicates local programming.
- Gray indicates encore programming.
- Blue-gray indicates news programming.
- Light green indicates sporting events.
- Red indicates series being burned off and other regularly scheduled programs, including specials and movies.
- highlight Yellow highlights indicates the top-10 most watched programs of the season.
- highlight Cyan highlights indicates numbers 11-20 most watched programs of the season.
- highlight Magenta highlights indicates numbers 21-30 most watched programs of the season.
- highlight Highlights indicates that it falls in multiple of the above categories.

== Sunday ==
Network		7:30 p.m.	8:00 p.m.	8:30 p.m.	9:00 p.m.	9:30 p.m.	10:00 p.m.	10:30 p.m.
ABC	Fall	Local programming	**The Sonny Comedy Revue**		The ABC Sunday Night Movie			
ABC	Winter	The Six Million Dollar Man		The ABC Sunday Night Movie				Local programming
CBS	Fall	Apple's Way		Kojak (14/23.3)		Mannix (20/21.6) (Tied with Cannon)		Local programming
CBS	Winter	**Cher** (22/21.3) (Tied with The Streets of San Francisco and NBC Sunday Mystery Movie)		Kojak (14/23.3)		Mannix (20/21.6) (Tied with Cannon)		Local programming
CBS	Summer	**Joey & Dad**		Kojak (14/23.3)		60 Minutes		Local programming
CBS	Late summer	**Manhattan Transfer**		Kojak (14/23.3)		60 Minutes		Local programming
NBC		The Wonderful World of Disney (18/22.0) (Tied with The Rookies)		NBC Sunday Mystery Movie: Columbo / McCloud / McMillan & Wife / **Amy Prentiss** (22/21.3) (Tied with **Cher** and The Streets of San Francisco)				Local programming

Note: 60 Minutes aired at 6:00-7:00 pm on CBS from September 1974 to June 1975.

== Monday ==
Network		8:00 p.m.	8:30 p.m.	9:00 p.m.	9:30 p.m.	10:00 p.m.	10:30 p.m.
ABC	Fall	The Rookies (18/22.0) (Tied with The Wonderful World of Disney)		Monday Night Football			
ABC	Winter	The Rookies (18/22.0) (Tied with The Wonderful World of Disney)		The ABC Monday Night Movie			
ABC	Mid-winter	The Rookies (18/22.0) (Tied with The Wonderful World of Disney)		**S.W.A.T.** (16/22.6)		**Caribe**	
CBS		Gunsmoke (28/20.5)		Maude (9/24.9)	**Rhoda** (6/26.3)	Medical Center (27/20.6)	
NBC	Fall	**Born Free**		NBC Monday Night at the Movies			
NBC	Winter	**The Smothers Brothers Show**		NBC Monday Night at the Movies			
NBC	Summer	The Baseball World of Joe Garagiola (8:00 p.m.) / Monday Night Baseball (8:15 p.m.)					

== Tuesday ==
Network	8:00 p.m.	8:30 p.m.	9:00 p.m.	9:30 p.m.	10:00 p.m.	10:30 p.m.
ABC	Happy Days	ABC Tuesday Movie of the Week			Marcus Welby, M.D.	
CBS	Good Times (7/25.8)	M*A*S*H (5/27.4)	Hawaii Five-O (10/24.8)		Barnaby Jones	
NBC	Adam-12	**NBC World Premiere Movie**			Police Story	

== Wednesday ==
Network		8:00 p.m.	8:30 p.m.	9:00 p.m.	9:30 p.m.	10:00 p.m.	10:30 p.m.
ABC	Fall	**That's My Mama**	ABC Wednesday Movie of the Week			**Get Christie Love!**	
ABC	Spring	**That's My Mama**	ABC Wednesday Movie of the Week			**Baretta**	
ABC	Summer	**That's My Mama**	ABC Wednesday Movie of the Week			**The Jim Stafford Show**	
CBS	Fall	**Sons and Daughters**		Cannon (20/21.6) (Tied with Mannix)		**The Manhunter**	
CBS	Winter	Tony Orlando and Dawn (25/20.7) (Tied with Paul Sand in Friends and Lovers)		Cannon (20/21.6) (Tied with Mannix)		**The Manhunter**	
CBS	Spring	Tony Orlando and Dawn (25/20.7) (Tied with Paul Sand in Friends and Lovers)		Cannon (20/21.6) (Tied with Mannix)		Dan August (R)	
CBS	Summer	Tony Orlando and Dawn (25/20.7) (Tied with Paul Sand in Friends and Lovers)		Cannon (20/21.6) (Tied with Mannix)		Mannix	
NBC		**Little House on the Prairie** (13/23.5)		**Lucas Tanner**		**Petrocelli**	

Note: Dan August consisted of reruns of the 1970-1971 ABC series.

== Thursday ==
Network		8:00 p.m.	8:30 p.m.	9:00 p.m.	9:30 p.m.	10:00 p.m.	10:30 p.m.
ABC	Fall	The Odd Couple	**Paper Moon**	The Streets of San Francisco (22/21.3) (Tied with Cher and The NBC Sunday Mystery Movie)		Harry O	
ABC	Winter	**Barney Miller**	**Karen**	The Streets of San Francisco (22/21.3) (Tied with Cher and The NBC Sunday Mystery Movie)		Harry O	
ABC	Summer	**Barney Miller**	**The Texas Wheelers**	The Streets of San Francisco (22/21.3) (Tied with Cher and The NBC Sunday Mystery Movie)		Harry O	
ABC	Late summer	**Almost Anything Goes!**		The Streets of San Francisco (22/21.3) (Tied with Cher and The NBC Sunday Mystery Movie)		Harry O	
CBS		The Waltons (8/25.5)		CBS Thursday Night Movie			
NBC	Fall	**Sierra**		Ironside		Movin' On	
NBC	Winter	**The Mac Davis Show**		**Archer**		Movin' On	
NBC	Spring	**Sunshine**	**The Bob Crane Show**	**The Mac Davis Show**		Movin' On	
NBC	Summer	**The Gladys Knight & the Pips Show**		NBC Thursday Night at the Movies			
NBC	Mid-summer	**Ben Vereen...Comin' At Ya**		NBC Thursday Night at the Movies			

== Friday ==
Network		8:00 p.m.	8:30 p.m.	9:00 p.m.	9:30 p.m.	10:00 p.m.	10:30 p.m.
ABC	Fall	**Kodiak**	The Six Million Dollar Man		**The Texas Wheelers**	**Kolchak: The Night Stalker**	
ABC	Mid-fall	Kung Fu		The Six Million Dollar Man		**Kolchak: The Night Stalker**	
ABC	Winter	**Kolchak: The Night Stalker**		**Hot L Baltimore**	The Odd Couple	**Baretta**	
ABC	Spring	**Kolchak: The Night Stalker**		**Hot L Baltimore**	The Odd Couple	**Get Christie Love!**	
CBS	Fall	**Planet of the Apes**		The CBS Friday Night Movie			
CBS	Winter	**Khan!**		The CBS Friday Night Movie			
CBS	Spring	**Paul Sand in Friends and Lovers**	**We'll Get By**	The CBS Friday Night Movie			
CBS	Summer	Special programming		The CBS Friday Night Movie			
NBC		Sanford and Son (2/29.6)	**Chico and the Man** (3/28.5)	**The Rockford Files** (12/23.7)		**Police Woman** (15/22.8)	

== Saturday ==
Network		8:00 p.m.	8:30 p.m.	9:00 p.m.	9:30 p.m.	10:00 p.m.	10:30 p.m.
ABC	Fall	**The New Land**		Kung Fu		**Nakia**	
ABC	Mid-fall	Movie special				**Nakia**	
ABC	Winter	Kung Fu		The ABC Saturday Night Movie			
ABC	Summer	**Keep on Truckin'**		The ABC Saturday Night Movie			
CBS	Fall	All in the Family (1/30.2)	**Paul Sand in Friends and Lovers** (25/20.7) (Tied with Tony Orlando and Dawn)	The Mary Tyler Moore Show (11/24.0)	The Bob Newhart Show (17/22.4)	The Carol Burnett Show (29/20.4)	
CBS	Winter	All in the Family (1/30.2)	**The Jeffersons** (4/27.6)	The Mary Tyler Moore Show (11/24.0)	The Bob Newhart Show (17/22.4)	The Carol Burnett Show (29/20.4)	
CBS	Summer	All in the Family (1/30.2)	**The Jeffersons** (4/27.6)	The Mary Tyler Moore Show (11/24.0)	The Bob Newhart Show (17/22.4)	**Moses the Lawgiver**	
CBS	Late summer	All in the Family (1/30.2)	**Big Eddie**	The Mary Tyler Moore Show (11/24.0)	The Bob Newhart Show (17/22.4)	**The Dick Cavett Show**	
NBC		Emergency! (30/20.0)		NBC Saturday Night at the Movies			

== By network ==
=== ABC ===
**Returning Series**

- The ABC Monday Night Movie
- The ABC Saturday Night Movie
- The ABC Sunday Night Movie
- ABC Tuesday Movie of the Week
- ABC Wednesday Movie of the Week
- Happy Days
- Kung Fu
- Marcus Welby, M.D.
- Monday Night Football
- The Odd Couple
- The Rookies
- The Six Million Dollar Man
- The Streets of San Francisco

**New Series**

- **Almost Anything Goes!** *
- **Baretta** *
- **Barney Miller** *
- **Caribe** *
- **Get Christie Love!**
- **Harry O**
- **Hot l Baltimore** *
- **The Jim Stafford Show** *
- **Karen** *
- **Keep on Truckin'** *
- **Kodiak**
- **Kolchak: The Night Stalker**
- **Nakia**
- **The New Land**
- **Paper Moon**
- **The Sonny Comedy Revue**
- **S.W.A.T.** *
- **The Texas Wheelers**
- **That's My Mama**

Not returning from 1973–74:

- Bob & Carol & Ted & Alice
- The Brady Bunch
- Chopper One
- The Cowboys
- Dick Clark Presents the Rock and Roll Years
- Doc Elliot
- The F.B.I.
- Firehouse
- Griff
- Just for Laughs
- Love, American Style
- Owen Marshall: Counselor at Law
- The Partridge Family
- Room 222
- Temperatures Rising
- Toma

=== CBS ===
**Returning Series**

- 60 Minutes
- All in the Family
- Apple's Way
- Barnaby Jones
- The Bob Newhart Show
- CBS Thursday Night Movie
- Cannon
- The Carol Burnett Show
- Good Times
- Gunsmoke
- Hawaii Five-O
- Kojak
- M*A*S*H
- Mannix
- The Mary Tyler Moore Show
- Maude
- Medical Center
- Tony Orlando and Dawn
- The Waltons
- Your Hit Parade

**New Series**

- **Big Eddie** *
- **Cher** *
- **The Friday Comedy Special** *
- **Friends and Lovers**
- **Frigidaire Spring Feature** *
- **The Jeffersons** *
- **Joey & Dad** *
- **Khan!** *
- **The Manhattan Transfer** *
- **The Manhunter**
- **Moses the Lawgiver** *
- **Planet of the Apes**
- **Rhoda**
- **Sons and Daughters**
- **We'll Get By** *

Not returning from 1973–74:

- Calucci's Department
- Dirty Sally
- The New CBS Tuesday Night Movies
- The New Dick Van Dyke Show
- Here's Lucy
- The Hudson Brothers Show
- The New Perry Mason
- Roll Out
- The Sonny & Cher Comedy Hour

=== NBC ===
**Returning Series**

- Adam-12
- Columbo
- Emergency!
- Ironside
- McCloud
- McMillan & Wife
- Monday Night Baseball
- NBC Monday Night at the Movies
- The NBC Mystery Movie
- NBC Saturday Night at the Movies
- Police Story
- Sanford and Son
- The Wonderful World of Disney

**New Series**

- **Amy Prentiss** *
- **Archer** *
- **Ben Vereen...Comin' At Ya** *
- **The Bob Crane Show** *
- **Born Free**
- **Chico and the Man** *
- **The Gladys Knight & the Pips Show**
- **Little House on the Prairie**
- **Lucas Tanner**
- **The Mac Davis Show** *
- **Movin' On**
- **NBC World Premiere Movie**
- **Petrocelli**
- **Police Woman**
- **The Rockford Files**
- **Sierra**
- **The Smothers Brothers Show** *
- **Sunshine** *

Not returning from 1973–74:

- The Brian Keith Show
- Chase
- The Dean Martin Comedy World
- The Dean Martin Show
- Diana
- The Flip Wilson Show
- The Girl with Something Extra
- Lotsa Luck
- Love Story
- The Magician
- Music Country USA
- NBC Follies
- Needles and Pins

Note: The * indicates that the program was introduced in midseason.

== Additional sources ==
- Castleman, H. & Podrazik, W. (1982). Watching TV: Four Decades of American Television. New York: McGraw-Hill. 314 pp.
- McNeil, Alex. Total Television. Fourth edition. New York: Penguin Books. ISBN 0-14-024916-8.
- Brooks, Tim & Marsh, Earle (1985). The Complete Directory to Prime Time Network TV Shows (3rd ed.). New York: Ballantine. ISBN 0-345-31864-1.
