= 1975–76 United States network television schedule =

The 1975–76 network television schedule for the three major English language commercial broadcast networks in the United States covers the primetime hours from September 1975 through August 1976. The schedule is followed by a list per network of returning series, new series, and series canceled after the 1974–75 season.

This was the first season for the current 22-hour weekly prime-time network schedule of three hours nightly Monday through Saturday and four hours on Sundays for the first time since 1971 after revisions to the Prime Time Access Rule. While there were provisions for two additional half-hours in the early evening to be used for public affairs and family-oriented programming, these slots were rarely if ever used by the networks. This was also the first of two seasons in which the networks were compelled to air family-friendly content before 9 p.m. under the FCC's Family Viewing Hour policy

PBS is not included as member stations have local flexibility over most of their schedules, and broadcast times for network shows may vary.

Each of the 30 highest-rated shows released in May 1976 is listed with its rank and rating as determined by Nielsen Media Research.

New series are highlighted in bold.

All times are U.S. Eastern and Pacific Time (except for some live sports or events). Subtract one hour for Central, Mountain, Alaska and Hawaii–Aleutian times.

== Legend ==
- Gray indicates encore programming.
- Blue-gray indicates news programming.
- Light green indicates sporting events.
- Red indicates series being burned off and other regularly scheduled programs, including specials and movies.
- highlight Yellow highlights indicates the top-10 most watched programs of the season.
- highlight Cyan highlights indicates numbers 11-20 most watched programs of the season.
- highlight Magenta highlights indicates numbers 21-30 most watched programs of the season.
- highlight Highlights indicates that it falls in multiple of the above categories.

== Sunday ==
Network		7:00 p.m.	7:30 p.m.	8:00 p.m.	8:30 p.m.	9:00 p.m.	9:30 p.m.	10:00 p.m.	10:30 p.m.
ABC		**The Swiss Family Robinson**		The Six Million Dollar Man (9/24.3)		The ABC Sunday Night Movie (13/23.0)			
CBS	Fall	**Three for the Road**		Cher		Kojak (20/21.8)		**Bronk**	
CBS	Winter	60 Minutes		**The Sonny & Cher Show** (23/21.2)		Kojak (20/21.8)		**Bronk**	
CBS	Summer	60 Minutes		Johnny Cash and Friends		Kojak (20/21.8)		Cannon	
NBC	Fall	The Wonderful World of Disney		**The Family Holvak**		The NBC Mystery Movie: Columbo / McCloud / McMillan & Wife / **McCoy**			
NBC	Winter	The Wonderful World of Disney		**Ellery Queen**		The NBC Mystery Movie: Columbo / McCloud / McMillan & Wife / **McCoy**			

Note: As of this writing, 60 Minutes has continually aired at the same 7:00 PM ET (or after sporting event overrun) time slot on CBS since December 1975.

== Monday ==
Network		8:00 p.m.	8:30 p.m.	9:00 p.m.	9:30 p.m.	10:00 p.m.	10:30 p.m.
ABC	Fall	**Barbary Coast**		Monday Night Football			
ABC	Mid-fall	**Mobile One**		Monday Night Football			
ABC	Winter	**On the Rocks**	Happy Days	The ABC Monday Night Movie (10/24.2)			
ABC	Spring	**On the Rocks**	**Good Heavens** (16/22.5) (Tied with Starsky and Hutch)	**Barbary Coast**		**Rich Man, Poor Man** (2/28.0)	
ABC	Mid-spring	**Good Heavens** (16/22.5) (Tied with Starsky & Hutch)	Monday Night Baseball				
ABC	Summer	**Viva Valdez**	Monday Night Baseball				
CBS		Rhoda (7/24.4) (Tied with Sanford and Son)	**Phyllis** (6/24.5)	All in the Family (1/30.1)	Maude (4/25.0)	Medical Center	
NBC	Fall	**The Invisible Man**		NBC Monday Night at the Movies			
NBC	Winter	**The Rich Little Show**		**Joe Forrester**		**Jigsaw John**	
NBC	Summer	**The John Davidson Show**		**Joe Forrester**		**Jigsaw John**	
NBC	Mid-summer	**Comedy Theatre**		**Joe Forrester**		**Jigsaw John**	

== Tuesday ==
Network		8:00 p.m.	8:30 p.m.	9:00 p.m.	9:30 p.m.	10:00 p.m.	10:30 p.m.
ABC	Fall	Happy Days (11/23.9)	**Welcome Back, Kotter** (18/22.1)	The Rookies		Marcus Welby, M.D.	
ABC	Winter	Happy Days (11/23.9)	**Laverne & Shirley** (3/27.5)	The Rookies		Marcus Welby, M.D.	
ABC	Spring	Happy Days (11/23.9)	**Laverne & Shirley** (3/27.5)	The Rookies		**Family**	
ABC	Summer	Happy Days (11/23.9)	**Laverne & Shirley** (3/27.5)	Specials			
CBS	Fall	Good Times (24/21.0)	**Joe and Sons**	**Switch**		**Beacon Hill**	
CBS	Winter	Good Times (24/21.0)	**Popi**	M*A*S*H (14/22.9) (Tied with The Waltons)	**One Day at a Time** (12/23.1)	**Switch**	
CBS	Spring	**The Bugs Bunny/Road Runner Show** (R)	Good Times (24/21.0)	M*A*S*H (14/22.9) (Tied with The Waltons)	**One Day at a Time** (12/23.1)	**Switch**	
CBS	Summer	I've Got a Secret	Good Times (24/21.0)	M*A*S*H (14/22.9) (Tied with The Waltons)	**One Day at a Time** (12/23.1)	**Switch**	
CBS	Mid-summer	**Popi**	Good Times (24/21.0)	M*A*S*H (14/22.9) (Tied with The Waltons)	**One Day at a Time** (12/23.1)	**Switch**	
NBC	Fall	Movin' On		Police Story		**Joe Forrester**	
NBC	Mid-fall	Movin' On		Police Woman (30/20.2)		**Joe Forrester**	
NBC	Winter	Movin' On		Police Woman (30/20.2)		**City of Angels**	

Note: Beginning March 9, Family was added onto ABC's lineup, replacing Marcus Welby, M.D..

== Wednesday ==
Network		8:00 p.m.	8:30 p.m.	9:00 p.m.	9:30 p.m.	10:00 p.m.	10:30 p.m.
ABC	Fall	**When Things Were Rotten**	That's My Mama	Baretta (22/21.3)		**Starsky & Hutch** (16/22.5) (Tied with Good Heavens)	
ABC	Winter	**The Bionic Woman** (5/24.9)		Baretta (22/21.3)		**Starsky & Hutch** (16/22.5) (Tied with Good Heavens)	
ABC	Spring	**Wonder Woman**		Baretta (22/21.3)		**Starsky & Hutch** (16/22.5) (Tied with Good Heavens)	
ABC	Late spring	**The Bionic Woman** (5/24.9)		Baretta (22/21.3)		**Starsky & Hutch** (16/22.5) (Tied with Good Heavens)	
CBS	Fall	Tony Orlando and Dawn		Cannon		**Kate McShane**	
CBS	Winter	Tony Orlando and Dawn		Cannon		**The Blue Knight**	
CBS	Summer	**The Jacksons**	**The Kelly Monteith Show**	Cannon		**The Blue Knight**	
NBC	Fall	Little House on the Prairie		**Doctors' Hospital**		Petrocelli	
NBC	Winter	Little House on the Prairie		Chico and the Man (25/20.8)	**The Dumplings**	Petrocelli	
NBC	Spring	Little House on the Prairie		**The Best of Sanford and Son** (R)	Chico and the Man (25/20.8)	Hawk (R)	
NBC	Mid-spring	Little House on the Prairie		**The Best of Sanford and Son** (R)	**Fay**	Hawk (R)	

Note: On NBC, The Best of Sanford and Son consisted of reruns of Sanford and Son from earlier seasons; Sanford and Son continued to air in its normal Friday 8:00-8:30 time slot during The Best of Sanford and Son's run. Hawk consisted of reruns of the 1966 ABC television series.

== Thursday ==
Network		8:00 p.m.	8:30 p.m.	9:00 p.m.	9:30 p.m.	10:00 p.m.	10:30 p.m.
ABC	Fall	Barney Miller	**On the Rocks**	The Streets of San Francisco (26/20.7) (Tied with The Bob Newhart Show and Donny & Marie)		Harry O	
ABC	Winter	**Welcome Back, Kotter** (18/22.1)	Barney Miller	The Streets of San Francisco (26/20.7) (Tied with The Bob Newhart Show and Donny & Marie)		Harry O	
ABC	Summer	**Welcome Back, Kotter** (18/22.1)	**What's Happening!!**	The Streets of San Francisco (26/20.7) (Tied with The Bob Newhart Show and Donny & Marie)		Harry O	
CBS	Fall	The Waltons (14/22.9) (Tied with M*A*S*H)		CBS Thursday Night Movie			
CBS	Late fall	The Waltons (14/22.9) (Tied with M*A*S*H)		Hawaii Five-O		Barnaby Jones	
NBC	Fall	**The Montefuscos**	**Fay**	**Ellery Queen**		**Medical Story**	
NBC	Winter	**Grady**	**The Cop and the Kid**	**NBC Thursday Night at the Movies**			
NBC	Spring	The Mac Davis Show		**NBC Thursday Night at the Movies**			

== Friday ==
Network		8:00 p.m.	8:30 p.m.	9:00 p.m.	9:30 p.m.	10:00 p.m.	10:30 p.m.
ABC	Fall	**Mobile One**		The ABC Friday Night Movie			
ABC	Mid-fall	**Barbary Coast**		The ABC Friday Night Movie			
ABC	Winter	**Donny & Marie** (26/20.7) (Tied with The Bob Newhart Show and The Streets of San Francisco)		The ABC Friday Night Movie			
CBS	Fall	Big Eddie	M*A*S*H (14/22.9) (Tied with The Waltons)	Hawaii Five-O		Barnaby Jones	
CBS	Winter	**Sara**		The CBS Friday Night Movie			
NBC	Fall	Sanford and Son (7/24.4) (Tied with Rhoda)	Chico and the Man (25/20.8)	The Rockford Files		Police Woman (30/20.2)	
NBC	Mid-fall	Sanford and Son (7/24.4) (Tied with Rhoda)	Chico and the Man (25/20.8)	The Rockford Files		Police Story	
NBC	Winter	Sanford and Son (7/24.4) (Tied with Rhoda)	**The Practice**	The Rockford Files		Police Story	

== Saturday ==
Network		8:00 p.m.	8:30 p.m.	9:00 p.m.	9:30 p.m.	10:00 p.m.	10:30 p.m.
ABC	Fall	**Saturday Night Live with Howard Cosell**		S.W.A.T.		**Matt Helm**	
ABC	Winter	Almost Anything Goes!		S.W.A.T.		**Bert D'Angelo/Superstar**	
CBS	Fall	The Jeffersons (21/21.5)	**Doc**	The Mary Tyler Moore Show (19/21.9)	The Bob Newhart Show (26/20.7) (Tied with Donny & Marie and The Streets of San Francisco)	The Carol Burnett Show (29/20.5)	
CBS	Summer	The Jeffersons (21/21.5)	**Ivan the Terrible**	The Mary Tyler Moore Show (19/21.9)	The Bob Newhart Show (26/20.7) (Tied with Donny & Marie and The Streets of San Francisco)	The Carol Burnett Show (29/20.5)	
NBC		Emergency!		NBC Saturday Night at the Movies			

== By network ==
=== ABC ===
**Returning Series**

- The ABC Monday Night Movie
- The ABC Sunday Night Movie
- Almost Anything Goes
- Baretta
- Barney Miller
- Happy Days
- Harry O
- Marcus Welby, M.D.
- Monday Night Baseball (moved from NBC)
- Monday Night Football
- The Rookies
- The Six Million Dollar Man
- The Streets of San Francisco
- S.W.A.T.
- That's My Mama

**New Series**

- **The ABC Friday Night Movie**
- **Barbary Coast**
- **Bert D'Angelo/Superstar** *
- **The Bionic Woman** *
- **Donny & Marie** *
- **Family** *
- **Good Heavens** *
- **Laverne & Shirley** *
- **Matt Helm**
- **Mobile One**
- **On the Rocks**
- **Rich Man, Poor Man** *
- **Saturday Night Live with Howard Cosell**
- **Starsky & Hutch** *
- **The Swiss Family Robinson**
- **Viva Valdez** *
- **Welcome Back, Kotter**
- **When Things Were Rotten**

Not returning from 1974–75:

- The ABC Saturday Night Movie
- ABC Tuesday Movie of the Week
- ABC Wednesday Movie of the Week
- Caribe
- Get Christie Love!
- Hot l Baltimore
- The Jim Stafford Show
- Karen
- Keep on Truckin'
- Kodiak
- Kolchak: The Night Stalker
- Kung Fu
- Nakia
- The New Land
- The Odd Couple
- Paper Moon
- The Sonny Comedy Revue
- The Texas Wheelers

=== CBS ===
**Returning Series**

- 60 Minutes *
- All in the Family
- Barnaby Jones
- Big Eddie
- The Bob Newhart Show
- Cannon
- The Carol Burnett Show
- Cher
- Good Times
- Hawaii Five-O
- I've Got a Secret *
- The Jeffersons
- Johnny Cash and Friends
- Kojak
- M*A*S*H
- The Mary Tyler Moore Show
- Maude
- Medical Center
- Rhoda
- CBS Thursday Night Movie
- Tony Orlando and Dawn
- The Waltons

**New Series**

- **Beacon Hill**
- **The Blue Knight** *
- **Bronk**
- **The Bugs Bunny/Road Runner Show** *
- **Doc**
- **Ivan the Terrible** *
- **The Jacksons** *
- **Joe and Sons**
- **Kate McShane**
- **The Kelly Monteith Show** *
- **One Day at a Time** *
- **Phyllis**
- **Popi** *
- **Sara** *
- **The Sonny and Cher Show** *
- **Switch**
- **Three for the Road**

Not returning from 1974–75:

- Apple's Way
- The Dick Cavett Show
- The Friday Comedy Special
- Friends and Lovers
- Frigidaire Spring Feature
- Gunsmoke
- Khan!
- Manhattan Transfer
- The Manhunter
- Mannix
- Planet of the Apes
- Sons and Daughters

=== NBC ===
**Returning Series**

- Chico and the Man
- Columbo
- Emergency!
- Little House on the Prairie
- The Mac Davis Show
- McCloud
- McMillan & Wife
- Movin' On
- The NBC Mystery Movie
- NBC Monday Night at the Movies
- NBC Saturday Night at the Movies
- Petrocelli
- Police Story
- Police Woman
- The Rockford Files
- Sanford and Son
- The Wonderful World of Disney

**New Series**

- **City of Angels** *
- **Comedy Theatre** *
- **The Cop and the Kid** *
- **Doctors' Hospital**
- **The Dumplings** *
- **Ellery Queen**
- **The Family Holvak**
- **Fay**
- **Grady** *
- **The Invisible Man**
- **Jigsaw John** *
- **Joe Forrester**
- **The John Davidson Show** *
- **McCoy**
- **Medical Story**
- **The Montefuscos**
- **NBC Thursday Night at the Movies**
- **The Practice** *
- **The Rich Little Show** *

Not returning from 1974–75:

- Adam-12
- Amy Prentiss
- Archer
- Ben Vereen...Comin' At Ya
- The Bob Crane Show
- Born Free
- The Gladys Knight & the Pips Show
- Ironside
- Lucas Tanner
- Monday Night Baseball (moved to ABC)
- Sierra
- The Smothers Brothers Show
- Sunshine

Note: The * indicates that the program was introduced in midseason.

== Additional sources ==
- Castleman, H. & Podrazik, W. (1982). Watching TV: Four Decades of American Television. New York: McGraw-Hill. 314 pp.
- McNeil, Alex. Total Television. Fourth edition. New York: Penguin Books. ISBN 0-14-024916-8.
- Brooks, Tim & Marsh, Earle (1985). The Complete Directory to Prime Time Network TV Shows (3rd ed.). New York: Ballantine. ISBN 0-345-31864-1.
