= Top-rated United States television programs of 1974–75 =

This table displays the top-rated primetime television series of the 1974–75 season as measured by Nielsen Media Research.

Rank	Program	Network	Rating
1	All in the Family	CBS	30.2
2	Sanford and Son	NBC	29.6
3	Chico and the Man	NBC	28.5
4	The Jeffersons	CBS	27.6
5	M*A*S*H	CBS	27.4
6	Rhoda	CBS	26.3
7	Good Times	CBS	25.8
8	The Waltons	CBS	25.5
9	Maude	CBS	24.9
10	Hawaii Five-O	CBS	24.8
11	The Mary Tyler Moore Show	CBS	24.0
12	The Rockford Files	NBC	23.7
13	Little House on the Prairie	NBC	23.5
14	Kojak	CBS	23.3
15	Police Woman	NBC	22.8
16	S.W.A.T.	ABC	22.6
17	The Bob Newhart Show	CBS	22.4
18	The Wonderful World of Disney	NBC	22.0
18	The Rookies	ABC	22.0
20	Mannix	CBS	21.6
20	Cannon	CBS	21.6
22	Cher	CBS	21.3
22	The Streets of San Francisco	ABC	21.3
22	The NBC Sunday Mystery Movie	NBC	21.3
25	Paul Sand in Friends and Lovers	CBS	20.7
25	Tony Orlando & Dawn	CBS	20.7
27	Medical Center	CBS	20.6
28	Gunsmoke	CBS	20.5
29	The Carol Burnett Show	CBS	20.4
30	Emergency!	NBC	20.0
