= Madigan (TV series) =

- Genre: Crime drama
- Starring: Richard Widmark
- Country of origin: United States
- Original language: English
- No. of seasons: 1
- No. of episodes: 6

Production
- Executive producer: Dean Hargrove
- Camera setup: Single-camera
- Running time: 90 mins.

Original release
- Network: NBC
- Release: September 20, 1972 – February 28, 1973

Related
- NBC Mystery Movie; Madigan (1968)

Madigan is an American crime drama television series based on the 1968 film of the same title, starring Richard Widmark as Sgt. Dan Madigan. The show aired on NBC in 1972–73 as part of the NBC Mystery Movie umbrella series.

== Synopsis ==
Dan Madigan is a pipe-smoking veteran police officer in New York, now dedicated to investigating cases in Europe. He is incorruptible and organized crime is the target. Despite the fact that the character in the 1968 film version died he was resurrected for this 'Mystery Movie' version which depicted the seedier side of New York for the initial home based episode, the short run series duly moved the central character to various overseas locations for episodes such as 'The Lisbon Beat', 'The London Beat' etc.

The show was initially grouped alongside Banacek (George Peppard) and Cool Million (James Farentino) as part of a rotating wheel of 'Mystery Movies' but never returned for a second season (along with 'Cool Million') while 'Banacek' was later grouped with Faraday & Company, Tenafly and The Snoop Sisters for its second season. The character was based on a much less admirable policeman in Richard Dougherty's 1962 novel "The Commissioner."

== Episodes ==
No.	Title	Directed by	Written by	Original release date
1	"The Manhattan Beat"	Alex March	Roland Wolpert	20 September 1972
Madigan's new partner has a background in sociology and wants to try to reason with criminals. Ronny Cox, Tony Lo Bianco and Murray Hamilton guest star.
2	"The Midtown Beat"	Jack Smight	William P. McGivern	4 October 1972
Madigan's latest case brings him to Harlem, where he uncovers a case of revenge motivated by bigotry. Cab Calloway, Nathan George, Charles Durning and Madge Sinclair guest star.
3	"The London Beat"	Jack Smight	William P. McGivern	8 November 1972
To catch a group of American gangsters hiding out across the pond, Madigan teams up with Scotland Yard. George Cole, Garfield Morgan, Bernard Archard and Fiona Lewis guest star.
4	"The Lisbon Beat"	Boris Sagal	Bernard C. Schoenfeld	3 January 1973
Madigan is in pursuit of a prisoner who is freed in a hijacking. Tom Adams, Bruce Boa, Damien Thomas and Peter Vaughan guest star.
5	"The Naples Beat"	Boris Sagal	Stephen Lord	31 January 1973
In an effort to shut down a heroin smuggling operation, Madigan offers protection to a deported gangster in exchange for information, but Madigan's informer has been marked for death by a rival gangster. Rossano Brazzi, Arnoldo Foà and Raf Vallone guest star.
6	"The Park Avenue Beat"	Alex March	Peter Allan Fields	28 February 1973
Madigan has his work cut out for him when he pursues an ex-cop who is now working as a hit man. Val Avery, Rae Allen, John Larch and Charles Cioffi guest star.

== See also ==
- List of The NBC Mystery Movie episodes
