= Faraday & Company =

- Genre: Crime drama
- Written by: Ken Pettus
- Directed by: Gary Nelson
- Starring: Dan Dailey; James Naughton; Sharon Gless; Geraldine Brooks
- Composer: Jerry Fielding
- Country of origin: United States
- Original language: English
- No. of seasons: 1
- No. of episodes: 4

Production
- Executive producer: Leonard B. Stern
- Producer: Stanley Kallis
- Production locations: Universal Studios: 100 Universal City Plaza, Universal City, California
- Camera setup: Single-camera
- Running time: 90 mins.
- Production companies: Talent Associates-Norton Simon; Universal TV

Original release
- Network: NBC
- Release: September 26, 1973 – January 9, 1974

Related
- NBC Mystery Movie

Faraday & Company is an American crime drama television series that was part of the NBC Mystery Movie. It lasted for only four episodes, which were rotated with Banacek, The Snoop Sisters, and Tenafly on Wednesday nights from 8:30 p.m. to 10:00 p.m. during the 1973–74 season. NBC rebroadcast the episodes on Tuesday nights from April through August 1974.

== Plot ==
Private investigator Frank Faraday (Dan Dailey), who had been falsely accused of murdering his partner, escapes from a South American prison after 28 years of confinement. Returning to a Los Angeles that has greatly changed during his absence, Frank discovers that he has a full-grown son named Steve (James Naughton), who is also a private investigator. Steve was the son of Frank's girlfriend, Lou Carson (Geraldine Brooks), who had taken over Frank's detective agency. Father and son now work together to solve mysteries, while Frank tries to adjust to modern life. Sharon Gless plays their secretary, Holly Barrett.

== Episodes ==
No.	Title	Directed by	Written by	Original release date
1	"Say Hello to a Dead Man"	Gary Nelson	Ken Pettus	September 26, 1973
Frank Faraday was imprisoned 28 years ago in the Caribbean. He escapes and returns to meet the son born while he was in prison, and who now operates a private detective agency. Together, they seek out the man who really shot his partner and framed Frank.
2	"A Wheelbarrow Full of Trouble"	Unknown	Unknown	October 24, 1973
Frank tries to figure out why a gang of criminals is so intent on securing a worthless used car.
3	"Fire and Ice"	Unknown	Unknown	December 12, 1973
Faraday & Company is on the hook when their security system fails to prevent the theft of industrial diamonds.
4	"A Matter of Magic"	Unknown	Unknown	January 9, 1974
Faraday tries to help an old friend, a security guard who is the chief suspect when his company experiences a series of thefts.

== See also ==
- List of The NBC Mystery Movie episodes
