= Paul Wendkos =

American film and TV director (1925–2009)

- Born: Abraham Paul Wendkos; September 20, 1925; Philadelphia, Pennsylvania
- Died: November 12, 2009 (aged 84); Malibu, California
- Occupations: Television director, film director
- Spouses: Ruth Bernat (m. 1953; died 1978) Lin Bolen (m. 1983)
- Children: 1

Abraham Paul Wendkos (September 20, 1925 – November 12, 2009) was an American television and film director.

== Early life and education ==
Wendkos was born in Philadelphia to parents Simon Wendkos and Judith Wendkos.

Wendkos served in World War II in the United States Navy and went to Columbia University on the G.I. Bill. Paul made his first feature, a documentary on a school for the blind called Dark Interlude in 1953.

== Career ==
Wendkos' first feature film was The Burglar. His fluid camera technique caught the attention of the head of Columbia Pictures, Harry Cohn, who not only wished to distribute the film but put Wendkos under contract.

Wendkos directed episodes of Playhouse 90 then did The Case Against Brooklyn (1958) for producer Charles Schneer at Columbia. He directed a TV movie for Columbia about Jesse James, Bitter Heritage (1958) and episodes of Behind Closed Doors (1958).

Wendkos directed another for Schneer, the war movie Tarawa Beachhead (1958). He had a massive hit with the teen film Gidget (1959) starring Sandra Dee, Cliff Robertson and James Darren. Face of a Fugitive (1959) was a Western for Schneer, and Battle of the Coral Sea (1959) was a war movie with Robertson.

Wendkos went back to TV for Five Fingers, Tightrope, Law of the Plainsman, Alcoa Theatre, Two Faces West, and Route 66.

He returned to Columbia for two youth movies with Darren and Michael Callan, Because They're Young (1960) and Gidget Goes Hawaiian (1961). He did a drama, Angel Baby (1961) with George Hamilton, then made Gidget Goes to Rome (1962).

Wendkos later directed episodes of Ben Casey, Dr. Kildare, The Rifleman, Mr. Novak, Honey West, The Big Valley, I Spy, and The Invaders. He also directed the pilot for the original Hawaii Five-O. When Wendkos worked on I Spy, he was dismissed from the production when the producers deemed the episodes he had filmed to have been too "arty".

In 1968 Wendkos signed a five-picture contract with Mirisch Productions, beginning with the war films Attack on the Iron Coast and Hell Boats, followed by two westerns set in Mexico (but filmed in Spain), Guns of the Magnificent Seven and Cannon for Cordoba. He also made the first and only feature film for Quinn Martin, The Mephisto Waltz.

From 1970 until his retirement in 1999, Wendkos specialized in made-for-television movies—one of these was The Taking of Flight 847: The Uli Derickson Story (1988), based on a TWA hijacking in 1985. It picked up five Emmy nominations, including one for Wendkos. He also directed 90-minute episodes of the James Stewart legal drama and murder mystery series Hawkins, which aired on an every-third-week basis as part of the CBS "wheel series" The New CBS Tuesday Night Movies.

== Personal life ==
Wendkos married Ruth Bernat on March 1, 1953, and had one son, Jordan Elkan Wendkos. Ruth died in June 1978. In 1984, Wendkos married Lin Bolen, former NBC vice president and producer; they lived in Malibu, California until his death.

Wendkos was ill for several years following a stroke. He died on November 12, 2009, in Malibu. He was survived by his son, Jordan, granddaughter, Justine Wendkos, and his wife, Lin Bolen Wendkos.
