= The Snoop Sisters =

- The Snoop Sisters title card
- Created by: Alan Shayne
- Starring: Helen Hayes; Mildred Natwick; Lou Antonio; Art Carney (Pilot); Bert Convy; Lawrence Pressman (Pilot)
- Opening theme: Jerry Fielding
- Country of origin: United States
- No. of seasons: 1
- No. of episodes: 4 (+ 1 TV movie)

Production
- Executive producer: Leonard B. Stern
- Camera setup: Single-camera
- Running time: 90 min.
- Production companies: Talent Associates-Norton Simon, Inc. Universal Television

Original release
- Network: NBC
- Release: December 19, 1973 – March 19, 1974

Related
- NBC Wednesday Mystery Movie

The Snoop Sisters is an American comedy-mystery television show that aired on NBC during the 1973–1974 season, airing on a monthly rotation (referred to as a "wheel") as part of the NBC Tuesday Mystery Movie, sharing the timeslot with Banacek, Tenafly, and Faraday and Company.

The show stars Helen Hayes and Mildred Natwick as two elderly sisters, Ernesta Snoop and Gwendolyn Snoop Nicholson, who routinely stumbled across mysteries, which they solve. The series followed the 1971 ABC television movie Do Not Fold, Spindle or Mutilate, which also starred Hayes and Natwick working together as amateur sleuths, along with Myrna Loy and Sylvia Sidney. A pilot for the series, also titled The Snoop Sisters, but later retitled "The Female Instinct", aired on December 16, 1972, on NBC.

Guest stars during the series' brief run include Joan Blondell, Jill Clayburgh, Alice Cooper, Bo Svenson, William Devane, Tammy Grimes, George Maharis, Roddy McDowall, Eve McVeagh, Geraldine Page, Walter Pidgeon, Vincent Price, Fritz Weaver and, in her final screen appearance, Paulette Goddard.

== Synopsis ==
Predating Murder, She Wrote, Ernesta was a mystery novelist, while her widowed sister Gwendolyn (known as "G") typed the stories from Ernesta's dictation. G was also a writer, but of poetry, having had one book of poetry published. Her late husband was named George, and G fancied he resembled Melvyn Douglas. The sisters lived in a townhouse on Gramercy Park in New York City and traveled in a 1920s Lincoln sedan. They were assisted in their investigations by Barney, their chauffeur and caretaker, played by Art Carney in the pilot and Lou Antonio in the series, and somewhat reluctantly by their nephew, NYPD Lieutenant Ostrowski, played by Lawrence Pressman in the pilot and Bert Convy in the series.

== Cast ==
- Helen Hayes as Ernesta Snoop
- Mildred Natwick as Gwendolyn Snoop Nicholson
- Lou Antonio as Barney
- Bert Convy as Lt. Steve Ostrowski

== Episode list ==
No.	Title	Directed by	Written by	Original release date
0	"The Female Instinct"	Leonard B. Stern	Alan Sharp, Leonard B. Stern, Hugh Wheeler	December 18, 1972
A spinster and her widowed sister, who are both mystery writers, try to track down the killer of a former movie star.
1	"Corpse and Robbers"	Leonard Horn	Don Ingalls, Leonard B. Stern	December 19, 1973
Ernesta receives a telephone call from an old gentleman friend — surprising, since he has been dead for months.
2	"Fear Is a Free-Throw"	Boris Sagal	Dorothy Herald	January 29, 1974
Gwendolyn is the prime suspect after a basketball star is poisoned by an antacid tablet she gave him.
3	"The Devil Made Me Do It!"	Leonard Horn	Tony Barrett; Robert Foster	March 5, 1974
The Snoop sisters uncover a Satanic cult when they endeavor to unravel the murder of an airline passenger.
4	"A Black Day for Bluebeard"	David Friedkin	Tony Barrett; Jackson Gillis	March 19, 1974
Vincent Price guest-stars as a washed-up horror movie star suspected of murdering his wealthy wife.

== Reception ==
Both Natwick and Hayes were nominated for Emmy Awards for their work on the program. Natwick won.

== DVD releases ==
Visual Entertainment released The Snoop Sisters: The Complete Series on DVD in Canada on March 15, 2011; and in the U.S. on June 7, 2011. Madman Entertainment released the complete series on DVD in Australia (Region 4) on March 16, 2011.

DVD name	Release dates		
DVD name	Region 1 (U.S.)	Region 1 (Can.)	Region 4 (Aus.)
The Snoop Sisters: The Complete Series	June 7, 2011	March 15, 2011	March 16, 2011

== See also ==
- List of The NBC Mystery Movie episodes
