= Bitter Heritage =

1958 TV film

- Screenplay by: Joseph Landon
- Directed by: Paul Wendkos
- Starring: Franchot Tone
- Country of origin: United States
- Original language: English

Production
- Running time: 90 minutes
- Production company: Screen Gems

Original release
- Release: 1958

Bitter Heritage is a 1958 American TV movie directed by Paul Wendkos and starring Franchot Tone. It was originally written for Playhouse 90. The widow of Jesse James, Jr. lodged an injunction with Screen Gems claiming invasion of privacy. The court turned down the injunction.

== Premise ==
The story of Jesse James's peace-loving son and his uncle Frank.

== Cast ==
- Franchot Tone as Frank James
- Elizabeth Montgomery as Mary Brecker
- James Drury as Jesse James, Jr.
- Henry Hull as Old Henry
- Eva Le Gallienne as Grandma James
- Dayton Lummis as Colonel Brecker
- Strother Martin as Earle Eheeler
- Robert Middleton as Luke Crocker
- Denver Pyle as Sam Wheeler
- Russell Thorson as Sheriff Piets

== Reception ==
The Los Angeles Times called the show "a corker" with "superb" work from the cast.
