= Hawkins (TV series) =

- Title card from Episode 1 of the regular-season series. Each episode's title card had a unique background and included the episode's title.
- Created by: David Karp
- Starring: James Stewart; Strother Martin
- Theme music composer: Jerry Goldsmith
- Composers: Jerry Goldsmith; George Romanis; Jerry Fielding; Jeff Alexander
- Country of origin: United States
- Original language: English
- No. of seasons: 1
- No. of episodes: 7 (+ pilot)

Production
- Executive producer: Norman Felton
- Running time: 74 minutes
- Production companies: Arena-Leda Productions; MGM Television

Original release
- Network: CBS
- Release: March 13, 1973
- Release: October 2, 1973 – March 5, 1974

Hawkins is an American legal drama and murder mystery television series which aired for one season on CBS from March 13, 1973 to March 5, 1974. The series starred James Stewart as rural-bred lawyer Billy Jim Hawkins, who investigated the cases in which he was involved.

== Premise ==
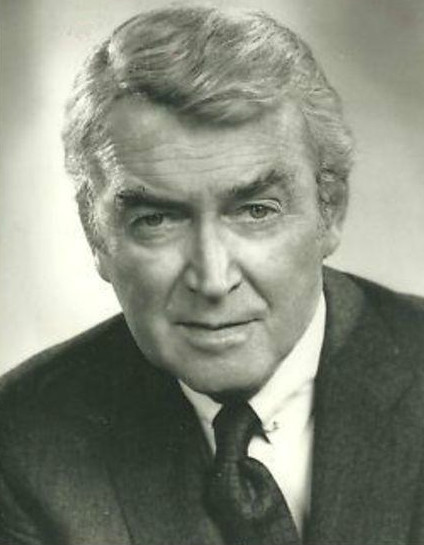
James Stewart as Billy Jim Hawkins.

Billy Jim Hawkins had given up his position as a deputy district attorney and opened a small-town private law practice in the fictional town of Beauville, West Virginia. Despite the rural, small-town location of his law office, clients from all over the United States come to him for a legal defense in murder cases. Hawkins has a homespun manner and speaks slowly, but is a shrewd and determined defense lawyer. He travels widely to investigate the cases he takes on, seeking evidence that will clear his clients and identify the real murderers. His cousin R. J. Hawkins usually travels with him and assists in his investigations.

== Cast ==
- James Stewart as Billy Jim Hawkins
- Strother Martin as R. J. Hawkins

== Production ==
David Karp created Hawkins, and Arena Productions produced the series in association with MGM Television. The show bore similarities to James Stewart′s 1959 hit movie Anatomy of a Murder, in which he also played a small-town lawyer who investigated the cases in which he was involved.

Hawkins was Stewart′s second attempt at starring in a television series; he had made his debut in series television in the unsuccessful situation comedy The Jimmy Stewart Show, which aired on NBC for a single season from 1971 to 1972. Hawkins was a far better fit for Stewart′s acting talents; it received good critical reviews and Stewart won a 1973 Golden Globe Award for Best Actor in Television Drama Series. However, the series was cancelled after the production of only eight episodes (its pilot episode and one season of seven episodes). Stewart requested the cancellation because he believed that the quality of scripts and directors in television could not continuously measure up to the level to which he was accustomed with theatrical films. He did not return to series television.

Norman Felton was the show's executive producer and Karp wrote or co-wrote the pilot and the regular-season episodes. Jud Taylor directed the pilot and some of the regular-season episodes, and Paul Wendkos or Robert Scheerer directed the rest. Jerry Goldsmith wrote the theme music.

== Broadcast history ==
The pilot episode of Hawkins aired as a 90-minute television movie on March 13, 1973. As a regular series, it premiered on October 2, 1973, airing on CBS on Tuesdays at 9:30 p.m. throughout its run. Like the series pilot, each regular-season episode was 90 minutes long. It was broadcast every third week as part of the "wheel series" The New CBS Tuesday Night Movies, alternating in its time slot with Shaft and a made-for-television movie. The "wheel series" was a popular programming strategy in television entertainment programming during the late 1960s and the 1970s in which two or more regular programs were rotated in the same time slot. However, Hawkins attracted a starkly different viewer demographic from Shaft, which probably worked against it finding an audience as part of The New CBS Tuesday Night Movies. With Hawkins a middling performer in the ratings, Stewart, concerned about the quality of the scripts, made clear his desire to bring it to an end. Reruns of Hawkins ran in prime time until the start of the fall season.

== Episodes ==
No.	Title	Directed by	Written by	Original release date
Pilot	"Death and the Maiden"	Jud Taylor	David Karp	March 13, 1973
Hawkins defends an heiress accused of a triple murder. Guest stars: Bonnie Bedelia, Robert Webber, Antoinette Bower, Dana Elcar, Kate Reid, David Huddleston, Margaret Markov, Ivan Bonar, Tom Hallick, Virginia Hawkins, and Charles McGraw. Also known as "Hawkins on Murder," this was the pilot for the series, broadcast as a 90-minute television movie.
1	"Murder in Movieland"	Jud Taylor	David Karp	October 2, 1973
Hawkins deals with phonies when he comes to Hollywood to defend a movie star's husband who admits clubbing someone to death. Guest stars: Sheree North, Cameron Mitchell, William Smithers, Kenneth Mars, Maggie Wellman, Thaao Penghlis, Ben Hammer, Deborah Newman, and Michael Stearns.
2	"Die, Darling, Die"	Paul Wendkos	David Karp, Gene L. Coon	October 23, 1973
Hawkins defends a widow accused of murdering her dying husband by throwing away his lifesaving medicine. She stands to inherit $2,000,000 from her late husband, but claims she discarded his medicine as an act of mercy. Guest stars: Julie Harris, Mayf Nutter, Murray Hamilton, Diana Douglas, Sam Elliott, Henry Jones, Judson Morgan, Melissa Newman, Noble Willingham, and Iggie Wolfington. Note: Strother Martin does not appear in this episode.
3	"A Life for a Life"	Jud Taylor	David Karp	November 13, 1973
Hawkins defends a neurotic man accused of murder who believed that the victim murdered his son — and had openly vowed to take "a life for a life." Guest stars: William Windom, John Ventantonio, James Hampton, Noam Pitlik, Tyne Daly, Jeanne Cooper, Joe Maross, Curt Conway, Gene Tyburn, Larry Delaney, Britt Leach, and Nelson D. Cuevas. Note: Strother Martin does not appear in this episode.
4	"Blood Feud"	Paul Wendkos	David Karp	December 4, 1973
Hawkins becomes involved in a dispute between warring family factions in his home town when he defends a man accused of killing another man during a reenactment of an American Civil War battle. Guest stars: Richard Kelton, Diana Ewing, James Best, Lew Ayres, Frank Marth, James Hampton, Jeanette Nolan, Mayf Nutter, and Frank Bonner.
5	"Murder in the Slave Trade"	Paul Wendkos	David Karp, Robert Hamner	January 22, 1974
After a fading football star is accused of murdering his team's hated owner, the victim's widow hires Hawkins to handle the defense. Guest stars: Robert Sampson, John Milford, Peter Mark Richman, Ellen Weston, Stacy Keach Sr., Dick Gautier, James Luisi, Carol Vogel, Joseph Hindy, Mayf Nutter, and Warren Kemmerling. Note: Strother Martin does not appear in this episode.
6	"Murder on the 13th Floor"	Jud Taylor	David Karp	February 5, 1974
Hawkins becomes emotionally involved in a murder case when his long-ago girlfriend begs him to defend her son, who is accused of stabbing a pretty dancer to death. Guest stars: Kurt Kasznar, Teresa Wright, Albert Paulsen, Andrew Parks, Jeff Corey, Signe Hasso, and Harvey Lembeck.
7	"Candidate for Murder"	Robert Scheerer	David Karp, Robert Hamner	March 5, 1974
Hawkins plunges into a world of rumors, scandal, and plots for revenge when he travels to Washington, D.C., to defend a United States Senator′s son who has been accused of murdering a muckraking reporter. Guest stars: Diana Hyland, Paul Burke, Andrew Prine, John Larch, Sandy Ward, Pernell Roberts, John Ericson, and Mark Gordon.
