= The Sonny & Cher Comedy Hour =

American variety show

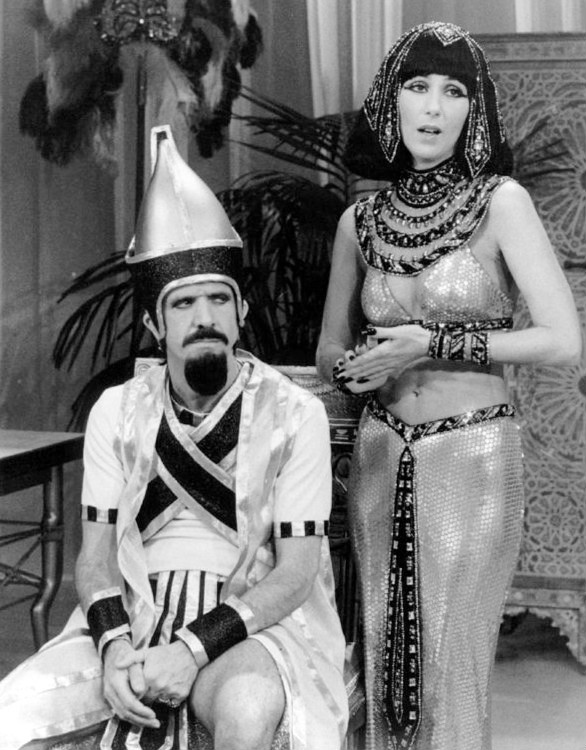
- Sonny Bono and Cher in an Egyptian soap opera skit on The Sonny and Cher Show, 1977
- Genre: Variety
- Directed by: Art Fisher
- Starring: Sonny and Cher
- Theme music composer: Sonny Bono
- Opening theme: "The Beat Goes On"
- Ending theme: "I Got You Babe"
- Country of origin: United States
- Original language: English
- No. of seasons: 4
- No. of episodes: 67

Production
- Producers: Chris Bearde; Allan Blye
- Running time: 52 minutes original air time

Original release
- Network: CBS
- Release: August 1, 1971 – May 29, 1974

Related
- The Sonny and Cher Show (1976–1977)

The Sonny & Cher Comedy Hour is an American variety show starring American pop singers Sonny Bono and Cher, who were married to each other at the time. The show ran on CBS in the United States, and premiered in August 1971. The show was cancelled in May 1974, due to the couple's divorce, but the duo reunited in 1976 for the similarly formatted The Sonny and Cher Show (a title sporadically used during the run of the Comedy Hour), which ran for two seasons, ending August 29, 1977.

== The Sonny & Cher Nitty Gritty Hour (1971) ==
The Sonny & Cher Comedy Hour was preceded by a one-off television special titled The Sonny & Cher Nitty Gritty Hour. Commissioned by the Canadian network CTV, it was recorded in 1970 and aired on May 31, 1971, at 8:30 p.m. on Channel 9 in Toronto. The special featured guest appearances by Sandy Baron, Suzanne Charney, Billy Van, Jerelyn Homer, psychologist Dr. Joyce Brothers and Andrea Davidson of the National Ballet of Canada. The Sonny & Cher Nitty Gritty Hour was produced by Ernest D. Glucksman, directed by Tim Kiley and executive produced by Philip Wedge. The writing team included Sandy Baron, Neal Marshall and Dennis Klein.

The program combined musical performances with comedic sketches, focusing on themes of relationships and gender dynamics. Sonny and Cher performed "We've Only Just Begun" and humorously portrayed their professional partnership. A recurring "battle of the sexes" theme featured sketches on topics such as in-laws and household dynamics. Cher performed "Alfie" in a solo number exploring modern women's conflicts, illustrated through contrasting dance styles—one representing innocence, the other experience—culminating in Cher dancing in underwear, symbolizing her struggle between traditional and contemporary values. The special also presented portrayals of historical couples such as Samson and Delilah, Christopher Columbus and Queen Isabella, and Julius Caesar and Cleopatra. Other segments included "I'm Getting Married", a comedy sketch with Billy Van and Sandy Baron, and an advice feature with Dr. Joyce Brothers providing relationship insights.

Although sometimes described as a pilot to CBS's The Sonny & Cher Comedy Hour, the Nitty Gritty Hour was originally produced and broadcast exclusively in Canada. In 2015, choreographer David Winters claimed he initially conceived Sonny and Cher's television format, envisioning a comedy-music blend with playful insults between Sonny and Cher. According to Winters, he developed the concept as a TV special and pilot, aiming for an ABC summer series, but the network chose the Smothers Brothers instead. He alleged that CBS later copied the idea, hired new producers and writers, and signed Sonny and Cher for their own series, The Sonny & Cher Comedy Hour, which became a major hit. Despite feeling wronged, Winters said he refrained from legal action to avoid conflicts with a major network but remained convinced his idea was the foundation of the successful CBS show.

== The Sonny & Cher Comedy Hour (1971–1974) ==
By 1971, Sonny & Cher had stopped producing hit singles as a duet act. Cher's first feature film, Chastity, was not a success, and the duo decided to sing and tell jokes in nightclubs across the country. CBS head of programming Fred Silverman saw them one evening and offered them their own show. The Sonny & Cher Comedy Hour was originally supposed to be a summer replacement series, but high ratings gave Silverman sufficient reason to bring it back later that year, with a permanent spot on the schedule. The show was taped at CBS Television City in Hollywood.

The show was a hit in the ratings for its entire run. Each episode opened with the show's theme song, which segued into the first few notes of "The Beat Goes On". Every episode, Sonny exchanged banter with Cher, allowing Cher to put down Sonny in a sarcastic, yet comic manner. Comedy skits followed, mixed with musical numbers. At the end of each episode, Sonny and Cher sang their hit "I Got You Babe" to the audience.

Many regular cast members appeared in sketches. Some notables include Teri Garr, Murray Langston (who later found brief fame as "The Unknown Comic" on The Gong Show), and Steve Martin (who also served as one of the show's writers). Regulars included:

- Peter Cullen (1971–1974)
- Freeman King (1971–1974)
- Murray Langston (1971–1974)
- Clark Carr (1971–1972)
- Tom Solari (1971–1972)
- Ted Zeigler (1971–1974)
- Steve Martin (1972–1975)
- Billy Van (1973–1976)
- Bob Einstein (1973–1974)
- Teri Garr (1973–1974)
- Gene Merlino (1971–1974)

Among the many guests who appeared on The Sonny & Cher Comedy Hour were Carol Burnett, George Burns, Glen Campbell, Tony Curtis, Bobby Darin, Phyllis Diller, Merv Griffin, the Jackson 5, Jerry Lee Lewis, Ronald Reagan, Burt Reynolds, The Righteous Brothers, Dinah Shore, Sally Struthers, the Supremes, Chuck Berry, and Dick Clark.

The show was scheduled to return for a fourth season in October 1974, but Sonny and Cher separated that fall, resulting in the cancellation of the show.

In 2004, selected episodes from The Sonny & Cher Comedy Hour were released in a three-disc set called The Sonny & Cher Ultimate Collection: The Best of The Sonny & Cher Comedy Hour and The Sonny and Cher Show on Region 1 DVD.

=== Recurring routines ===
- The Vamp Sketch: A sequence featuring at least three mini-skits, Cher played notorious women in history (e.g.: Cleopatra, Nefertiti, Marlene Dietrich), each one preceded by Cher in a parlor setting lying atop an old-style upright piano with Sonny pretending to play, singing one verse of the song between each mini-skit (the lyrics usually set up the next mini-skit), followed by the chorus, "She was a scamp, a camp and a bit of a tramp, she was a V-A-M-P, vamp". It ended with all the characters from each skit (even Sonny and Cher, via camera trickery, in their respective costumes) all converging to sing the final chorus together. In later seasons, the Vamp sketch was replaced with "Shady Miss Lady Luck", a similar group of mini-sketches that were bracketed by Cher in a Las Vegas-style setting.
- Sonny's Pizza: Sonny is the proprietor of a pizza restaurant whose food, according to almost everyone except Sonny himself, is not fit to be eaten (the logo on the front door is augmented with the slogan, "You won't believe you ate the whole thing", a play on the then-popular Alka-Seltzer commercial).
- Mr. & Ms.: This gender-bending sketch has Cher as the breadwinner in the household, working as a business executive and wearing a three-piece suit. She would come home to Sonny, a beleaguered house-husband who usually complained about how bad his day had been.
- The Fortune Teller: Cher is inside a fortune-telling vending machine. When Sonny inserted a quarter to hear his fortune, she would give bad news or insults, but anyone else, particularly a given week's guest star, would get a good fortune that would almost immediately come true.
- At the Launderette: A laundromat sketch that has Cher as Laverne, a housewife with tacky fashion sense cracking jokes to straight-woman Olivia, played by Garr.

== The Sonny Comedy Revue (1974) ==
In 1974, Sonny and Cher agreed to end the show, as they were separating from each other. Their timeslot was given to Tony Orlando and Dawn the next fall. They both starred in separate variety shows over the next two years. Sonny Bono's 1974 variety series, The Sonny Comedy Revue, led off the ABC Sunday-night lineup, but lasted just 13 episodes. While it retained the creative team behind The Sonny & Cher Comedy Hour, Bono's solo effort was largely a victim of the show's weak time slot and the established hits it faced on NBC and CBS. Initially, when Cher was reported as appearing in her own show on CBS, TV Guide predicted that Sonny's show would be the greater success.

== Cher (1975–1976) ==
Starting in early 1975, Cher also returned to network television with her solo variety show, entitled Cher, which also aired on CBS. It did well during its abbreviated run and was renewed for the 1975–76 season. During the second season, though, Cher herself decided to end the show to work with Sonny again. Although Sonny's show had most of the cast and crew from the comedy hour (except the musical director) and was expected to be the bigger hit, Cher's show easily became the greater success, both in the ratings and by fan response. Due to contracts, Cher was unable to perform many of her sketches and characters from the comedy hour on her show; Sonny had them on his show, instead.

Among the many guests who appeared on the Cher show were Bette Midler, Elton John, Pat Boone, David Bowie, Ray Charles, Steve Martin, The Jackson 5, Ike & Tina Turner, Dion, Wayne Newton, Linda Ronstadt, Flip Wilson, Lily Tomlin, Frankie Valli, Tatum O'Neal, Raquel Welch, Wayne Rogers, and Labelle.

== The Sonny and Cher Show (1976–1977) ==
In February 1976, with the bitterness of their divorce behind them, the couple reunited for The Sonny and Cher Show. This incarnation of the series was produced by veteran musical variety-show writers, Frank Peppiatt and John Aylesworth. It was basically the same format as their first variety series, but with different writers to create new sketches and songs. A new logo – a stylized hand with fingers crossed – symbolized their working relationship.

The duo's opening conversations were markedly more subdued and made low-key references to the couple's divorce, as well as Cher's subsequent marriage to Gregg Allman. (During production, Cher was pregnant with and eventually bore Allman's son, Elijah). Some jokes would become awkward; in one opening segment Cher gave Sonny a compliment, and Sonny jokingly replied "That's not what you said in the courtroom!" Nonetheless, the revived series garnered enough ratings to be renewed for a second season. By this time, however, the variety show genre was already in steep decline, and Sonny and Cher was one of the few successful programs of the genre remaining on the air. The show's final season, which aired as a mid-season replacement in the winter of 1977, was moved to the Friday night death slot, with the last episodes burned off in a late-evening Monday nighttime slot not typically used for comedy or variety series that summer.

The cast of regulars included Comedy Hour alums Ted Zeigler and Billy Van, Gailard Sartain (on loan from Peppiatt and Aylesworth's other series Hee Haw), announcer Jack Harrell (who later gained fame as the longtime announcer for the original version of The People's Court), and mime duo Shields and Yarnell. Billy Van left the show during season 1.

Some of the guests who appeared on The Sonny and Cher Show included Frankie Avalon, Muhammad Ali, Raymond Burr, Ruth Buzzi, Charo, John Davidson, Barbara Eden, Neil Sedaka, Farrah Fawcett, Bob Hope, Don Knotts, Jerry Lewis, Tony Orlando, The Osmonds, Debbie Reynolds, The Smothers Brothers, Tina Turner, Twiggy, The Jacksons, and Betty White.

== Production notes ==
The Sonny & Cher Comedy Hour taped its opening and closing segments in front of a live studio audience. The Sonny & Cher "concert" segment was also taped in front of the same audience, as were some of the segments featuring musical guest stars—as these typically were taped after the closing segment was completed. Due to blocking, costuming, and other staging and production requirements, most of the comedy segments were taped without an audience, with a laugh track added in postproduction.

== Broadcast history and Nielsen ratings ==
=== The Sonny & Cher Comedy Hour ===
Season	Time slot (ET)	Rank	Rating
1970–71	Sunday at 8:30-9:30 pm	Not in the Top 30	
1971–72	Monday at 10:00-11:00 pm	27	20.2
1972–73	Friday at 8:00-9:00 pm (September 1972 - December 1972); Wednesday at 8:00-9:00 pm (December 1972 - May 1974)	Not in the Top 30	
1973–74	Friday at 8:00-9:00 pm (September 1972 - December 1972); Wednesday at 8:00-9:00 pm (December 1972 - May 1974)	7	23.3 (Tied with Kojak)

=== The Sonny and Cher Show ===
Season	Time slot (ET)	Rank	Rating
1975–76	Sunday at 8:00-9:00 pm	23	21.2
1976–77	Friday at 9:00-10:00 pm (January 1977 - March 1977); Monday at 10:00-11:00 pm (May 1977 - August 1977)	Not in the Top 30	

== Reception ==
The series earned one Emmy award out of 22 nominations for Art Fisher for Outstanding Directorial Achievement in Variety or Music in 1972. Fisher also received Emmy nominations for his work in 1973 and 1974, as did Tim Kiley as director for the series in 1976. Other Emmy nominations were for Outstanding Variety Series in 1972, 1973 and 1974; Outstanding New Series in 1972; Outstanding Single Program - Variety or Music in 1972; Outstanding Writing Achievement in Variety for Bob Arnott, Chris Bearde, Allan Blye, George Burditt, Bob Einstein, Phil Hahn, Coslough Johnson and Paul Wayne in 1972 and 1974 (Steve Martin also was nominated in the category in 1972 and Jim Mulligan was in 1974); Outstanding Achievement in Costume Design for Bob Mackie and Ret Turner in 1972, 1974 and 1977; Outstanding Achievement in Music, Lyrics and Special Material for Earl Brown in 1972 and 1973; Outstanding Achievement in Musical Direction for James E. Dale in 1972 and for Marty Paich in 1974; Outstanding Achievement in Lighting Direction for John R. Beam in 1973; Outstanding Achievement in Technical Direction for technical director Charles Franklin and cameramen Gorman Erickson, Jack Jennings, Tom McConnell, Barney Neeley and Richard Nelson in 1973; and Outstanding Achievement in Any Area of Creative Technical Crafts for Rena Leuschner for hairdressing in 1974.

The Sonny & Cher Comedy Hour also earned Golden Globe nominations in 1973 and 1974 for Best Television Series - Musical or Comedy and a win for Cher for Best Performance by an Actress in a Television Series - Comedy or Musical.

== Syndication ==
Reruns of the series were seen on TV Land from the time of its launch in April 1996 to 2000 under the title The Sonny & Cher Show, with a package of 65 30-minute episodes edited from both the 1971–74 series and the 1976–77 series. From 2016 to 2020, getTV broadcast several episodes of both the 1971–74 and 1976–77 series, including some which had never aired on TV Land. In addition, getTV also carried the series Cher under a separate contract.

== List of guest stars ==
A

- Don Adams
- Jack Albertson
- Muhammad Ali
- Paul Anka
- Frankie Avalon

B

- Rona Barrett
- Barbi Benton
- Chuck Berry
- Ken Berry
- Dr. Joyce Brothers
- Jim Brown
- Carol Burnett
- George Burns
- Raymond Burr
- Ruth Buzzi
- John Byner
- Edd Byrnes

C

- Glen Campbell
- Truman Capote
- Art Carney
- Diahann Carroll
- Charo
- Dick Clark
- The Coasters
- Mike Connors
- William Conrad
- Rita Coolidge
- Howard Cosell
- Larry Csonka
- Tony Curtis

D

- Bobby Darin
- John Davidson
- Billy Davis Jr.
- The DeFranco Family
- Phyllis Diller
- Sandy Duncan
- Jimmy Durante

E

- Barbara Eden
- Ralph Edwards
- Chad Everett

F

- Douglas Fairbanks Jr.
- Fanny
- Farrah Fawcett
- Glenn Ford
- Tennessee Ernie Ford
- George Foreman
- Redd Foxx

G

- Paul Michael Glaser
- George Gobel
- Robert Goulet
- The Grass Roots
- Peter Graves
- Lorne Greene
- Joel Grey
- Merv Griffin
- Andy Griffith
- Bob Guccione

H

- Joey Heatherton
- Hugh Hefner
- Sherman Hemsley
- Honey Cone
- Bob Hope
- Hudson Brothers
- Engelbert Humperdinck
- Wilfrid Hyde-White

I

- Ike & Tina Turner

J

- The Jackson 5
- Janet Jackson
- Elton John
- Van Johnson
- Tom Jones

K

- Gabe Kaplan
- Alex Karras
- Howard Keel
- Bob Keeshan
- Billie Jean King
- Evel Knievel
- Ted Knight
- Don Knotts (five episodes)
- Harvey Korman (one episode)
- Kris Kristofferson

L

- Carol Lawrence
- Steve Lawrence
- Jerry Lewis
- Jerry Lee Lewis

M

- Marilyn McCoo
- Ed McMahon
- Barbara McNair
- Anne Meara
- Don Meredith
- Robert Merrill
- Ricardo Montalbán

N

- Jim Nabors (four episodes)
- Joe Namath
- Ted Neeley
- The New Seekers
- Jeanette Nolan
- Peter Noone

O

- Carroll O'Connor
- Gilbert O'Sullivan
- Tony Orlando
- Donny Osmond
- Marie Osmond

P

- Jack Palance
- Bernadette Peters
- Vincent Price

R

- Tony Randall
- Ronald Reagan
- Burt Reynolds (two episodes)
- Debbie Reynolds
- The Righteous Brothers
- Wayne Rogers

S

- Telly Savalas
- Neil Sedaka
- Bobby Sherman
- Shields and Yarnell (six episodes)
- Dinah Shore
- O. J. Simpson
- Kate Smith
- Martha Smith
- The Smothers Brothers
- Mark Spitz
- Rick Springfield
- Jean Stapleton
- David Steinberg
- McLean Stevenson
- Larry Storch
- Sally Struthers
- The Supremes
- The Sylvers

T

- The Temptations
- Danny Thomas
- Richard Thomas
- Tina Turner
- Twiggy

V

- Karen Valentine
- Frankie Valli & The Four Seasons
- Bobby Vinton

W

- Lyle Waggoner (two episodes)
- Nancy Walker
- Dennis Weaver
- Betty White
- Andy Williams
- Flip Wilson
- Wolfman Jack
- Cynthia Wood
