= Kodiak (TV series) =

- Genre: Drama
- Created by: Stan Shpetner; Anthony Lawrence
- Directed by: William Witney
- Starring: Clint Walker
- Country of origin: United States
- Original language: English
- No. of seasons: 1
- No. of episodes: 13 (7 unaired)

Production
- Producer: Stan Shpetner
- Production locations: Alaska, United States
- Running time: 30 minutes
- Production companies: Kodiak Productions; Warner Bros. Television

Original release
- Network: ABC
- Release: 13 September – 4 October 1974

Kodiak is a half-hour adventure program that aired Friday evenings at 8:00 p.m Eastern time on ABC during the 1974–1975 television season. The show filled the time spot left vacant by ABC's cancellation of The Brady Bunch.

The show revolved around the main character of Cal "Kodiak" McKay (Clint Walker), an Alaska State Trooper. Kodiak, always accompanied by his Eskimo sidekick Abraham Lincoln Imhook (Abner Biberman), used his four-wheel drive truck to track down desperate killers through 50,000 miles of Alaska backcountry.

The show received unfavorable reviews from critics like The New York Times John J. O'Connor who called it a "disaster" and wrote: "This disaster, starring Clint Walker, is filmed in Alaska, where Kodiak is a member of the State Patrol. The opening espisode has something to do with the theft of ”an 80 grand payroll.” There is much howling wind and spraying snow. Mr. Walker's frozen method of acting effectively complements the setting. The result is about as interesting as watching a large block of polluted ice."

It suffered low ratings due to being scheduled opposite NBC's mega-hit Sanford and Son. Kodiak was cancelled after the first episode, although a total of six episodes were aired. The show was filmed in Bend, Oregon, using the Old Skyliners Ski Lodge as the primary meeting place.

Maggie Blye had the role of police radio dispatcher Mandy.

The program was created by Stan Shpetner and Anthony Lawrence; Shpetner was the producer.

== Episodes ==
Episode #	Episode title	Original airdate	Plot
1-1	"Red Snow, White Death"	September 13, 1974	Kodiak's hunt for a killer is aided by a reluctant witness—an old Eskimo intent on dying ceremoniously in the mountains like his ancestors. With Stefanie Powers, Jeff Morris, John Carter.
1-2	"Death Chase"	September 20, 1974	Following the shooting of a young girl's father, two snowmobiles are pitted against each other in a desperate chase as Kodiak pursues the girl and her boyfriend. With Kay Lenz, Bill Vint, Lonny Chapman, Jeanne Bates.
1-3	"A Time to Die"	September 27, 1974	A grieving, vengeful father threatens to kill Kodiak to prevent him from bringing his son's murderer to trial and thus carve out his own justice. With Steve Forrest, Morgan Woodward, Ben Andrews, Than Wyenn, Sam Edwards.
1-4	"The Last Enemy"	October 4, 1974	Kodiak must stop an old war buddy who believes that he is fighting the same war again. With William Shatner, Beth Brickell.
1-5	"The Hunters"	Never aired	A pair of hunters arrives on a mysterious mission involving the bush nurse Mandy. Mandy Farrow is being hounded by her former boyfriend and a gangster. With Jason Evers.
1-6	"Captured"	October 11, 1974	Kodiak and Imhook deal with a seal poacher and his brother. With Ed Lauter, Kiel Martin, Elliott Street, Walter Barnes.
1-8	"Lesson in Terror"	October 18, 1974	Kodiak has to mix in a domestic quarrel to aid a youngster. With Maggie Blye, Richard Bradford, Robbie Benson, Mary Murphy, and Hal Baylor.
1-7	"Cold Fear (aka The Killer)"	never aired	Kodiak must rush a pregnant woman to the bush nurse. Kodiak's attempt to get an expectant mother through the snow to where professional help is available runs into a double confrontation with an angry husband and an escaping murderer. With Marianne Hill, William Lucking.
1-9	"The Deadly Promise (aka The Burning Snow)"	never aired	Kodiak is named probation officer of a hot-tempered Indian (A Martinez) just released from jail. Kodiak finds himself in mid-air with an injured pilot and desperate prisoner. Kodiak finds himself in a plane with an unconscious pilot, and at the mercy of a defiant parolee who can either tell him how to land or to go to blazes. With A. Martinez, Ayn Ruymen.
1-10	"Killers Three (aka Thunder Mountain)"	never aired	Kodiak hast to get a thief down out of the mountains. Two fugitives track Kodiak, who is caring for a baby and has a prisoner in tow. With Robert F. Lyons, Mitchell Ryan.
1-11	"Deadly Friend"	never aired	Kodiak becomes suspicious of a cop who arrives to extradite a young car thief. Officer Mitch Kellog has come to take John Nootka back to Seattle on a charge of car theft and tells a very different tale of life and death, but which is Kodiak to believe? With Ed Ames, Brian Fong, Lani Scarratt.
1-12	"The Animals (aka Chains of Ice)"	never aired	Ford Windust is an embittered gold miner who has lost his arm and now he keeps his partner, Abel Lonegan in chains and under the threat of his shotgun to keep him mining for gold. With Cameron Mitchell, Bill McKinney.
1-13	"The Rescue"	never aired	Kodiak is in rough country with a stretcher case, an elderly woman, and a bush-pilot with a broken shoulder to cope with the going sets even tougher. Kodiak attempts the rescue of three plane-crash victims, one of whom was hospital-bound for heart surgery. The cop rescues a mother and her daughter from a plane that has crashed in rugged Alaskan wilderness. With Allyn Ann McLerie.
