= McCoy (TV series) =

- Genre: Drama
- Written by: Dean Hargrove; Roland Kibbee
- Directed by: Nicholas Colasanto; Richard Quine
- Starring: Tony Curtis; Roscoe Lee Browne; Lucille Meredith
- Composer: Dick DeBenedictis
- Country of origin: United States
- Original language: English
- No. of seasons: 1
- No. of episodes: 5 (including a pilot film)

Production
- Producer: Roland Kibbee
- Camera setup: Single-camera
- Running time: 90 mins.
- Production company: Universal TV

Original release
- Network: NBC
- Release: October 5, 1975 – January 25, 1976

Related
- NBC Sunday Mystery Movie

McCoy is an American comedy-drama series that starred Tony Curtis and aired on NBC-TV during the 1975–1976 season.

== Synopsis ==
The series stars Tony Curtis as a con man who, along with a team of friends, "out-cons" bad guys in order to steal back their ill-gotten gains and return the loot to its rightful owners. The schemes were elaborate and laced with satirical humor. The series bears resemblances to the then-recent film The Sting, as well as to the contemporary series Switch and the British literary character Simon Templar. Co-starring with Curtis was Roscoe Lee Browne as a nightclub comedian.

== Episodes ==
| No. | Title | Directed by | Written by | Original release date |
|---|---|---|---|---|
| 1 | "The Big Ripoff" | Dean Hargove | Dean Hargrove, Roland Kibbee | March 11, 1975 |
Series pilot: McCoy schemes to retrieve the ransom money that was paid for an oil tycoon's wife.
| 2 | "Bless the Big Fish" | Nicholas Colasanto | Philip Chapin | October 5, 1975 |
A crafty financial adviser cheats Papa Leone out of $450,000, and Leone tries to commit suicide as a result; McCoy intervenes with a plan to recover the money.
| 3 | "Double Take" | Richard Quine | Dean Hargrove, Roland Kibbee, Howard Leeds | November 30, 1975 |
| 4 | "In Again Out Again" | Stan Dragoti | Unknown | January 4, 1976 |
J. Carter Sloan takes advantage of dying Bob Mayfield by forcing him to make a $200,000 life insurance contract, which affects Bob's sister's interests.
| 5 | "New Dollar Day" | Nicholas Colasanto | Unknown | January 25, 1976 |

== Production and reception ==
The series was produced in the format of two-hour telefilms, that were broadcast as part of the NBC Sunday Mystery Movie as one of several rotating series that would air once a month. Other series involved in the Universal Television franchise package were Columbo, McCloud, and McMillan & Wife. However, McCoy failed to garner the same ratings as its fellow programs and was cancelled after an initial 90-minute pilot TV movie ("The Big Ripoff") and four two-hour episodes were broadcast. A novelization of the pilot, written by Linda Stewart as "Sam Stewart", titled for the series, was published by Dell in 1976, and reprinted as McCoy: The Big Rip-Off, under W.H. Allen's Star imprint in the United Kingdom.

== See also ==
- List of The NBC Mystery Movie episodes
