= Just for Laughs (1974 TV series) =

American television anthology series

- Genre: Anthology series
- Country of origin: United States
- Original language: English
- No. of seasons: 1
- No. of episodes: 4

Production
- Running time: 30 minutes

Original release
- Network: ABC
- Release: August 8 – August 29, 1974

Just for Laughs is an American anthology television series that aired on ABC in the summer of 1974. The 30-minute episodes consisted of unsold television pilots for situation comedies.

== Background ==
The practice of television executives of ordering dozens of pilots for proposed television series each year – far more than their networks could possibly broadcast as series – created a sizable body of unsold pilots that had never aired. Packaging these unsold pilots in anthology series and airing them during the summer provided television networks with a way of both providing fresh programming during the summer rerun season and recouping at least some of the expense of producing them. Just for Laughs was one of these series, aired by ABC in the summer of 1974, and it consisted entirely of unsold pilots for situation comedies. Stars appearing in the series included Frank Sutton, Cloris Leachman, Dick Van Patten, Hal Linden, and Barbara Eden.

The third episode of Just for Laughs, "The Life and Times of Captain Barney Miller," served as the basis for the premiere episode of the successful situation comedy Barney Miller, which began its seven-season run in January 1975. After the pilot failed to sell, the show's concept was reworked, with a revamped cast and most of Miller's domestic life eliminated, although the premiere episode largely reused the script from the pilot aired on Just for Laughs.

== Broadcast history ==
Just for Laughs ran for four episodes over the course of four consecutive weeks in August 1974, airing on ABC from 8:30 to 9:00 p.m. Eastern Time on Thursday evenings. It premiered on August 8, and its last episode aired on August 29.

== Episodes ==
No.	Title	Directed by	Written by	Original release date
1	"Ernie, Madge, and Artie"	Unknown	Unknown	August 8, 1974
A recently married middle-aged couple is haunted by the spirit of the wife's dead first husband, creating an unusual marital love triangle. Starring Frank Sutton, Cloris Leachman, and Dick Van Patten.
2	"Ann in Blue"	Unknown	Unknown	August 15, 1974
Tired of being stuck behind desks on public relations duties, a four-woman New York City Police Department neighborhood police team in Manhattan tries to get involved in real police work. Starring Penny Fuller, Marybeth Hurt, Mary Elaine Monte, and Hattie Winston.
3	"The Life And Times of Captain Barney Miller"	Theodore J. Flicker	Danny Arnold & Theodore J. Flicker	August 22, 1974
Captain Barney Miller, a New York City Police Department precinct captain, faces pressure from his wife to give up his dangerous work and get a safer and better-paying job, but when a drug addict takes his precinct hostage, he has to talk the addict out of it. Starring Hal Linden, Abby Dalton, Abe Vigoda, Rod Perry, Charles Haid, Val Bisoglio, Henry Beckman, Chu Chu Malave, and Buddy Lester. A reworked version of this pilot, with a revamped cast but reusing most of the script, became the January 23, 1975, premiere episode of the situation comedy Barney Miller.
4	"The Barbara Eden Show"	Unknown	Unknown	August 29, 1974
The head writer for a hit soap opera has a hectic life. At work, she faces a number of problems, including the refusal of the show's mean-spirited star to go along with the plot lines she develops, while at home she has trouble dealing with her husband and son. Starring Barbara Eden, Moosie Drier, Joe Flynn, Roger Perry, Lyle Waggoner, Bob Harks, and Pat Morita.
