= Cher (TV series) =

1970s American variety show hosted by Cher

- Logo of the show
- Genre: Variety
- Directed by: Art Fisher; George Schlatter
- Presented by: Cher
- Country of origin: United States
- Original language: English
- No. of seasons: 2
- No. of episodes: 26

Original release
- Network: CBS
- Release: February 12, 1975 – January 4, 1976

Cher is an American variety show that aired on CBS from February 1975 to January 1976, hosted by singer-actress Cher. The show had many famous musical guests. Its first episode, aired on February 12, 1975, was marketed as a television special with guests Elton John, Bette Midler and Flip Wilson. It was followed, four days later, at 7:30 p.m. on Sunday, February 16, 1975, by the weekly Cher show. At the end of its first season, the show ranked first among variety shows and twenty-second among all programs, with a 21.3 average household share, also receiving the most fan mail of any CBS program at the time. The first season aired Sundays at 7:30 p.m. and the second aired at 8:00 p.m.

== Overview ==
The show featured Cher interviewing various celebrity guests ranging from musicians to actors and pop culture figures. The series also featured sketches and comedic field reports. Cher would also perform her songs with a live band. David Geffen, with whom Cher had an affair while waiting for her divorce from Sonny Bono to be finalized, served as producer.

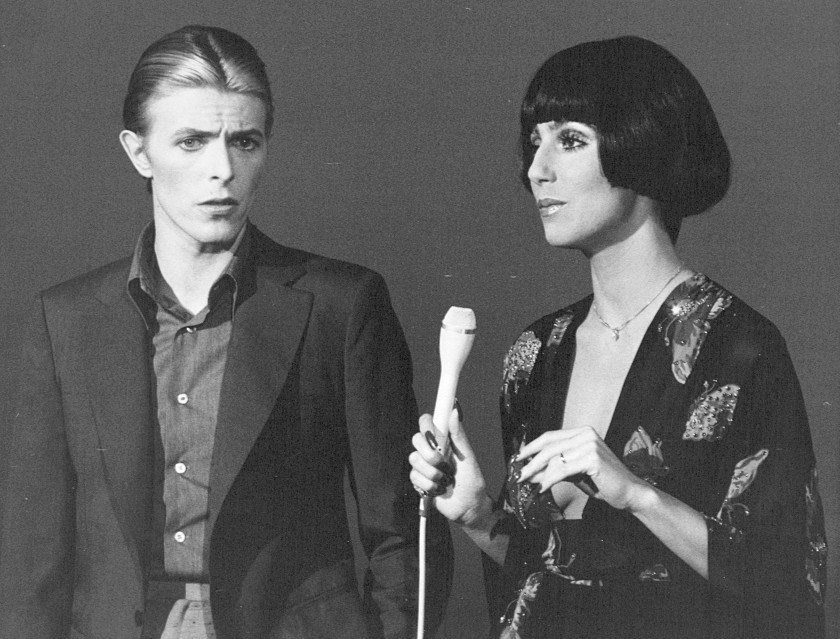
David Bowie performing with Cher on the variety show in November 1975

With Sonny, Cher had co-starred in The Sonny & Cher Comedy Hour for CBS from 1971 to 1974, before the two divorced amid major bitterness and acrimony. Each partner would get their own series: Cher got this series on CBS, while Sonny (who got to keep all of the staff and intellectual property from the Comedy Hour) got The Sonny Comedy Revue. Cher was allowed to keep the Comedy Hour's musical director, Jimmy Dale, and Comedy Hour director Art Fisher also directed several Cher episodes. The two were to face each other head-to-head in the ratings, but ABC cancelled the Revue before Cher premiered.

By the end of the season, Sonny and Cher had set aside their differences and agreed to reunite. She later stated that doing the show alone was overwhelming. Cher was immediately replaced by a revived The Sonny & Cher Show, with a new production and writing team. With Sonny, the new show lasted 1 1/2 seasons, airing until 1977.

== Home media and syndication ==
Time-Life includes select episodes of Cher as part of its compilation DVD sets: ten episodes are included in The Best of Cher and five on I Got You Babe: The Best of Sonny & Cher.

The network getTV sporadically reruns the series.
