= The New CBS Tuesday Night Movies =

The New CBS Tuesday Night Movies (known as The New CBS Friday Night Movies in its first season) is a weekly 90-minute motion picture made expressly for television. The series aired on CBS from 1971 to 1974. During its first two seasons, the program was similar to ABC's Movie of the Week, which presented a brand-new full-length feature film in a regular weekly time slot with no connecting theme or arc among the films. In the fall of 1972, the series moved from Friday nights to Tuesdays, with its Friday night slot given back to traditional previously released theatrical films under The CBS Friday Night Movies banner (The New CBS Friday Night Movies replaced The CBS Friday Night Movies during its first season).

During the 1973–1974 television season, CBS revised the series into The New CBS Tuesday Night Movies. In the revision CBS adopted both the ABC and NBC approaches. They developed two rotating series, similar to The NBC Mystery Movie (both produced by MGM Television) and continued to premiere brand new feature-length films as television movies seen on alternating weeks.

The two series-like projects were:

- Shaft, a series television version of the 1970s blaxploitation film franchise (itself based on Ernest Tidyman's 1970 novel of the same name), starring Richard Roundtree reprising the role of John Shaft.
- Hawkins, starred James Stewart as Billy Jim Hawkins, a rural lawyer who investigated the cases he was involved in, not unlike Stewart's role in the 1959 film Anatomy of a Murder.
- Every third week was a television movie.

The New CBS Tuesday Night Movies was cancelled after the 1973–1974 television season. Television films seen on CBS would be incorporated into its Thursday and Friday night movie programs, beginning with the 1974–1975 season.
