= The Dean Martin Comedy World =

American variety comedy television series

- Genre: Variety
- Created by: Dean Martin; Greg Garrison
- Presented by: Jackie Cooper; Nipsey Russell; Barbara Feldon
- Country of origin: United States
- Original language: English
- No. of seasons: 1
- No. of episodes: 6

Production
- Camera setup: Multi-camera
- Running time: 48 mins.
- Production company: Greg Garrison Production

Original release
- Network: NBC
- Release: June 6 – August 15, 1974

The Dean Martin Comedy World is an American variety comedy television series, seen on NBC during the summer of 1974, as a summer replacement for The Dean Martin Show. It was also that program's last summer replacement series. The show was hosted by Jackie Cooper, Nipsey Russell and Barbara Feldon.

== Overview ==
Created by Dean Martin and his producer Greg Garrison, the premise of this series was that it traveled around the world to find new comedy acts and show them on the air. Clips from classic comedy films (like Charlie Chaplin's Modern Times) were also used, as were interviews with comedy legends like Jack Benny (in one of his last appearances before his December 26 death later that year) and Don Rickles. The hodge-podge, staccato-style of editing different comic bits didn't work out, and the show left the air by the end of the summer.

Notable among those who appeared was the debut television performance by Andy Kaufman.

In addition, British comedy troupe Monty Python had its first primetime appearance on United States television on this show, with clips from several sketches and Terry Gilliam animations used. (It was Garrison's purchase of the rights to air Python clips that paid for the conversion of the BBC series from PAL to NTSC, which allowed Monty Python's Flying Circus to be sold to PBS later that year.) These clips did have to pass muster with American network censors, and so in the "Dull Life of a City Stockbroker" sketch the topless news agent was cut out.

== Bibliography ==
- The Dean Martin Comedy World at IMDb
