= Diana (American TV series) =

1973 American sitcom

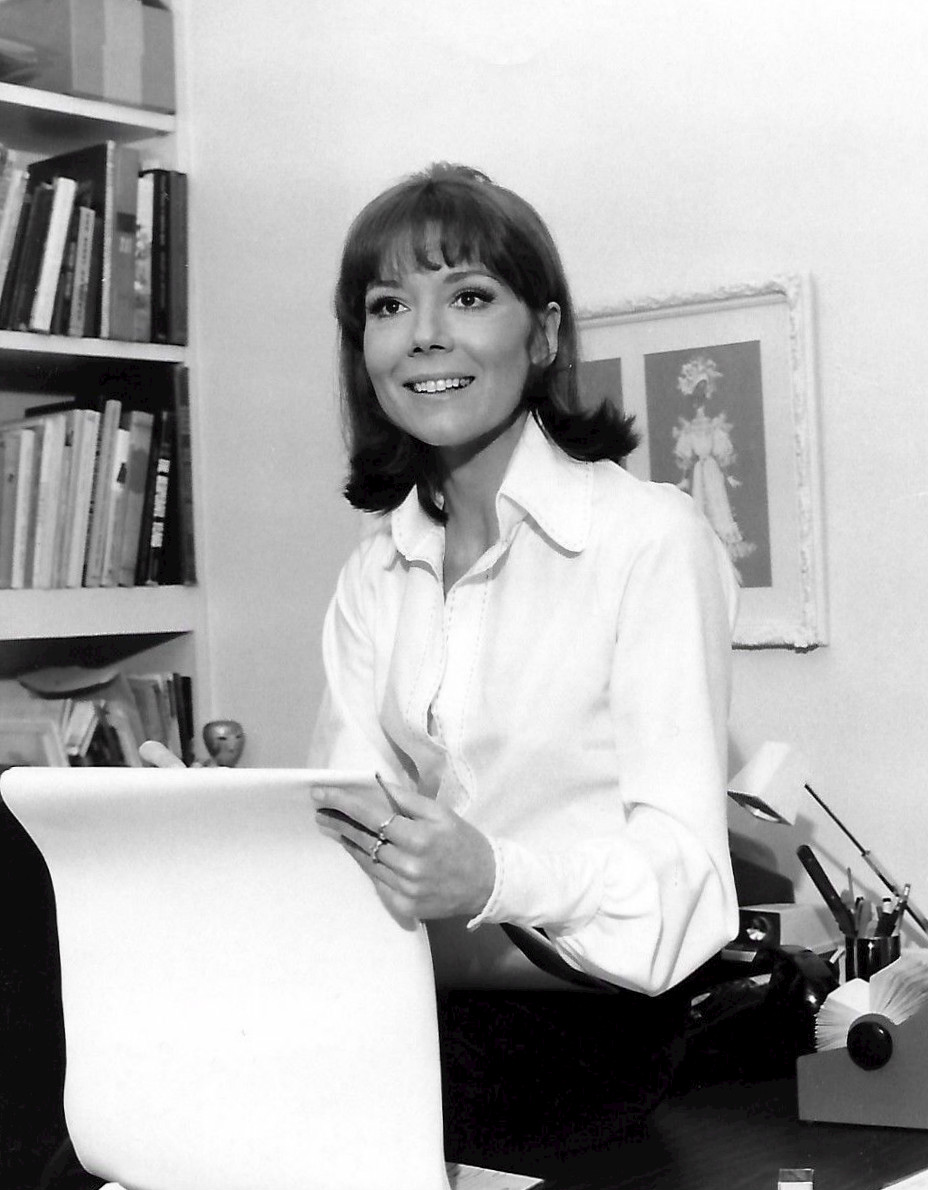
- Genre: Sitcom
- Created by: Leonard B. Stern; Gordon Farr; Arnold Kane
- Written by: Leonard B. Stern; Stanley Charles; Stan Cutler
- Starring: Diana Rigg; Richard B. Shull; Barbara Barrie; Carole Androsky; Richard Mulligan; Robert Moore
- Theme music composer: Jerry Fielding
- Composer: Jerry Fielding
- Country of origin: United States
- Original language: English
- No. of seasons: 1
- No. of episodes: 15

Production
- Executive producers: Harry R. Sherman; Leonard B. Stern
- Producers: Leonard B. Stern; Gordon Farr; Arnold Kane
- Camera setup: Multi-camera
- Running time: 25 mins.
- Production company: Talent Associates-Norton Simon, Inc.

Original release
- Network: NBC
- Release: September 10, 1973 – January 7, 1974

Diana is an American sitcom aired on NBC during the 1973–74 television season, created by Leonard Stern, which ran from September 10, 1973, to January 7, 1974. The series was filmed in front of a live studio audience at CBS Studio Center in Los Angeles.

== Premise ==
The series starred Diana Rigg in her first American television series, as Diana Smythe, a recently divorced British fashion designer who moves to the United States in the hopes of becoming more noticed in the fashion world by relocating to New York City. As the series begins she has landed a high-profile job as a fashion coordinator at Buckley's Department Store. Since her city-dwelling brother is out of the country indefinitely she moves into his apartment, which to her bemusement becomes the site of many unannounced visits by her brother’s numerous girlfriends.

Each episode finds Diana trying to adjust to American life with help from her next door neighbor Holly Green (Carole Androsky), copywriter Howard Tollbrook (Richard B. Shull), window decorator Marshall Tyler (Robert Moore) and new pal Jeff Harmon (Richard Mulligan), while dealing with her boss Norman Brodnik (David Sheiner) and his wife Norma (Barbara Barrie).

== Production ==
Prior to being picked up by NBC, the series had the working title The Diana Rigg Show with Rigg playing Elyse Smythe. Also in the pilot was Nanette Fabray as Norma Brodnik, but after it was changed to Diana, Fabray was replaced with Barrie in the Norma role.

NBC was hoping to capitalize on the success of single and independent women sitcoms by using Rigg, given her credentials in film and TV, with this attempt to copy The Mary Tyler Moore Show. However, it was not a success with the critics or viewing public, and wound up trailing both Gunsmoke and The Rookies on Monday nights, eventually leading to its cancellation on January 7, 1974.

== Episode list ==
No.	Title	Directed by	Written by	Original release date
1	"The Lady Comes Across"	Leonard B. Stern	Sam Bobrick & Ron Clark & Leonard B. Stern	September 10, 1973
Diana arrives in New York, only to find her new job involves a hostile boss – and that her borrowed apartment houses a suicidal writer.
2	"The Gilt Complex"	Leonard B. Stern	Stanley Charles	September 17, 1973
Diana is invited out to a platonic dinner date by her married boss. Though it's absolutely innocent, guilt soon rears its head on all sides.
3	"Shuffle Off To Buffalo"	Unknown	Unknown	September 24, 1973
Diana is called upon to narrate a fashion show.
4	"If No One Answers, That's Me"	Robert Moore	Lisa David & Laura Dean	October 1, 1973
After getting an obscene phone call, Diana invests in an answering machine.
5	"Hanrahan's Rainbow"	Unknown	Unknown	October 8, 1973
Diana receives someone else's alien identification card.
6	"Fire One"	Unknown	Unknown	October 15, 1973
To prove her worth to the company, Diana is asked to fire a friend.
7	"Queen For A Night"	Unknown	Unknown	October 29, 1973
A dentist won't leave Diana alone until she helps him launch a fashion career.
8	"Take My Father, Please"	Unknown	Jerry Mayer	November 5, 1973
Diana enters into a May–December relationship with a friend's father.
9	"You Can't Go Back"	Jay Sandrich	Gordon Farr & Arnold Kane	November 12, 1973
Former Avengers co-star Patrick Macnee guest stars as an old flame of Diana's, who drives her crazy with his self-centered ways.
10	"Pest in the House"	Unknown	Unknown	November 26, 1973
Howard, needing a place to stay, temporarily moves into Diana's apartment.
11	"Long Shots and Fat Chances"	Unknown	Unknown	December 3, 1973
Diana agrees to keep Howard's money safe from his compulsive gambling.
12	"Never, Never, Ever Again....Maybe"	Unknown	Unknown	December 10, 1973
Howard is trying to get Diana together with his charming high-school buddy.
13	"Who's Minding the Cat?"	Unknown	Unknown	December 17, 1973
Confusion reigns as Diana and her office-mates try to keep track of Howard's foot-loose cat.
14	"New Marshall In Town"	Unknown	Jerry Mayer	December 24, 1973
Marshall suffers an identity crisis after his psychiatrist suggests a new lifestyle.
15	"Kung Who?"	Unknown	Unknown	January 7, 1974
Diana's friend Holly cannot seem to stop falling for married men.
