= The Sonny Comedy Revue =

- Genre: Variety show
- Starring: Sonny Bono; Teri Garr; Murray Langston; Billy Van; Peter Cullen; Freeman King; Ted Ziegler; The Lex De Azevedo Orchestra
- Country of origin: United States
- Original language: English
- No. of seasons: 1
- No. of episodes: 13

Production
- Running time: 1 hour

Original release
- Network: ABC
- Release: September 22 – December 29, 1974

The Sonny Comedy Revue, starring Sonny Bono, was a variety show that aired on ABC for 13 episodes from September–December, 1974. It was his first solo effort after the end of his marriage to Cher and the resulting cancellation of their variety show The Sonny & Cher Comedy Hour.

== Production ==
On April 24, 1974, ABC signed Sonny Bono to host his own variety hour at 8 PM on Sunday evenings that fall after CBS passed on the option. It was the only new variety show joining network television that fall and only one of two on the air for the start of the fall 1974 season, the other being The Carol Burnett Show. The Sonny Comedy Revue taped at ABC Studio 55.

On September 23, 1974, one day after Bono's show premiered, CBS signed Cher to host her own solo variety show, set to begin airing at 7:30 p.m. Sunday nights in February 1975. This would have put the shows in direct competition. However, Sonny's show was cancelled before that could happen.

ABC had high hopes for the new variety hour headed by Bono, as his show had many of the writers, producers and cast from the Sonny & Cher Comedy Hour. Some of the popular skits were even carried over, including "Sonny’s Pizza.". New skits such as "The Newsstand" (which centered on jokes about current events) were added. In addition, there were many segments where female guest stars would make fun of Sonny, just as Cher did on their previous show.

== Reception ==
After premiering on September 22, 1974, the show struggled to find an audience. Critics said the show was "uneven," and that Cher's presence was sorely missed. The Des Moines Register's TV critic, Dianne Milobar, in a blistering review, declared, "The ghost of Cher haunts the Sonny Comedy Revue." She declared that the Newsstand segment was "unbearable," and, of the show overall, "Few laughs are genuine. Most are pitiful." TV columnist Forrest Powers said the show "needs a lot of smoothing out to overcome the absence of Cher. Unless an 'instant' patching job is done, I'll give solo Sonny 13 weeks." Other critics were more kind, notably James Brown of The Los Angeles Times, who wrote, "Sonny without Cher works quite well--most of the time." Brown concluded, "The Sonny Comedy Revue is mostly good fun, and a notch above the variety factory printouts we've become accustomed to. And as one colleague so aptly put it, 'ABC needs all the help it can get.' With Sonny Bono, they've possibly gotten more than they bargained for." Harry Harris of The Philadelphia Inquirer also saw potential in Bono's solo outing, "Can Sonny make it as a TV star without Cher? ABC's first 'Sonny Comedy Revue' suggests that his chances aren't bad. The variety hour is fast-moving, crammed with camera tricks and often quite amusing...Plus marks go to some zany skits."

Nevertheless, the show was in immediate trouble, as the premiere episode ranked 41st out of 61 programs for the week. Subsequent episodes fared even more poorly: the October 20, 1974 episode, for example, ranked 50th out of 53 shows. ABC programmers themselves realized just weeks into the new season that the program was hampered by its poor time slot, competing against established TV shows like Kojak and The Wonderful World of Disney. Disney on NBC had a jump start by airing at 7:30 PM (Kojak aired at 8:30 on CBS), while Bono's show did not start until 8:00 PM.

The show was also the victim of a weak ABC schedule that fall. "ABC is into the most disastrous new show scheduling in more than a decade," said Joyce Haber of The Los Angeles Times. "ABC's ratings are so weak, overall, that the chances of any new show scoring high enough in the Nielsen numbers for a pick up next fall are minimal."

By mid-October, Les Brown of the New York Times reported that ABC was considering moving the show at mid-season to 7:30 PM, but a continued decline in ratings took the mid-season option off the table. On November 14, 1974, ABC announced its "second season" schedule and the cancellation of The Sonny Comedy Revue. The last of 13 original episodes aired December 22, 1974 (a Christmas-themed episode with guest star Lucie Arnaz), and the final episode aired December 29, 1974 (a repeat episode with guest Clifton Davis). After its demise, the show was nominated for an Emmy for Outstanding Achievement in Costume Design for the 1974–1975 season.

During the run of Cher's show, she and Sonny got a chance to go "head to head" in the ratings when he guest-starred on The Six Million Dollar Man, starring Lee Majors, the program that had replaced his in the 8 p.m. Sunday time slot. The Six Million Dollar Man won in the ratings.

== Cast ==
- Sonny Bono
- Teri Garr
- Ted Ziegler
- Freeman King
- Peter Cullen
- Billy Van
- Murray Langston

== Guest stars ==
The show features several guest stars each week:

- Alex Karras
- Avril Lund
- Barbara Eden
- Billy Preston
- Charo
- Cloris Leachman
- Clifton Davis
- Ed McMahon
- Frankie Avalon
- Glen Campbell
- Howard Cosell
- Jack Albertson
- James Brolin
- Jill St. John
- Jim Nabors
- Joey Heatherton
- Juliet Prowse
- Karen Valentine
- Loretta Swit
- Lucie Arnaz
- McLean Stevenson
- Raquel Welch
- Sally Struthers
- Shirley Cothran, former Miss America
- Smokey Robinson
- The Hudson Brothers
- The Jackson 5
- The Staples Singers
- The Spinners
- The Temptations
- Twiggy
