= Banacek =

American television series (1972–1974)

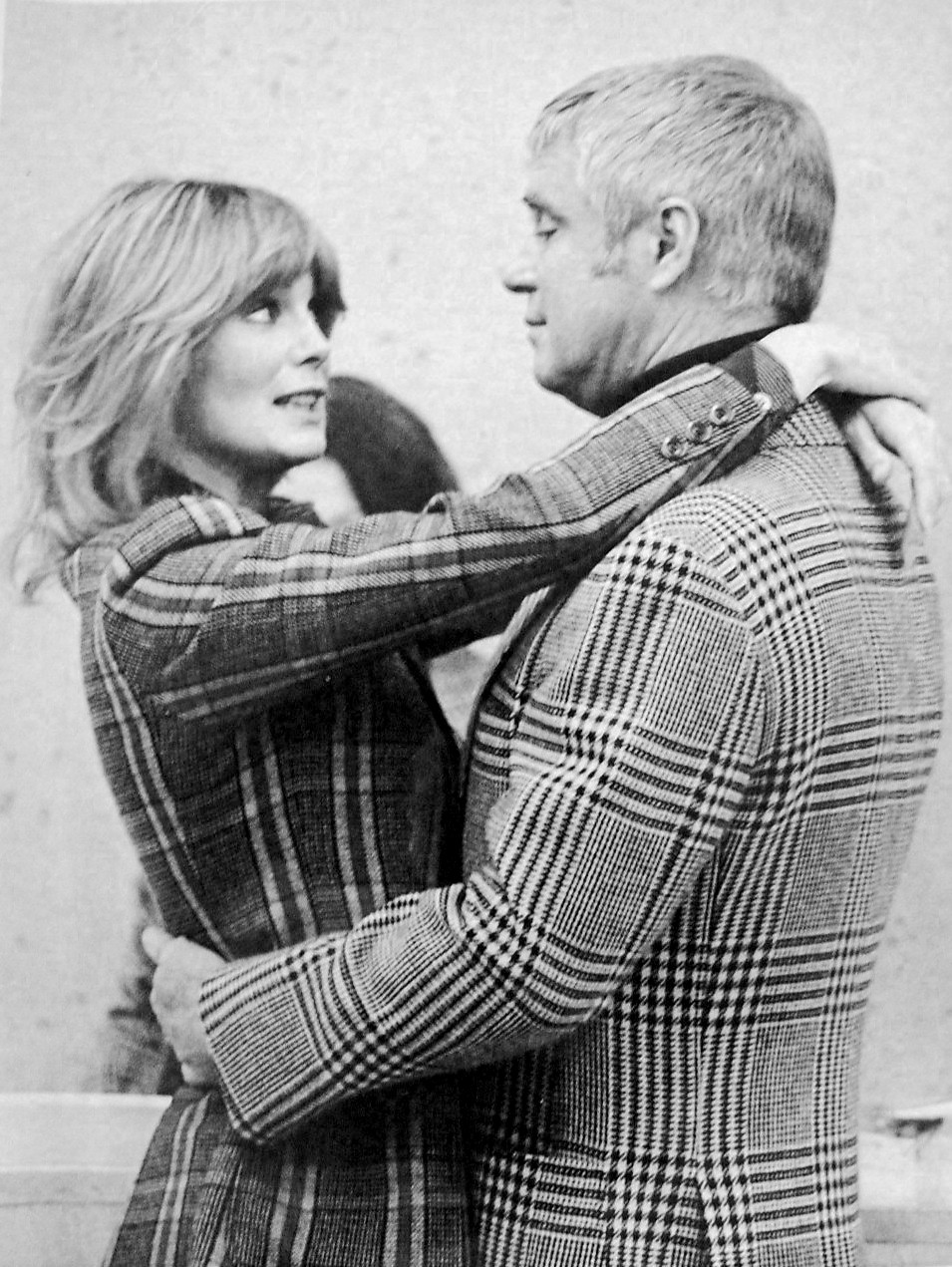
- Peppard and guest star Linda Evans, 1974
- Genre: Crime drama
- Created by: Anthony Wilson
- Starring: George Peppard; Ralph Manza; Murray Matheson; Christine Belford; George Murdock
- Theme music composer: Billy Goldenberg
- Country of origin: United States
- No. of seasons: 2
- No. of episodes: 17

Production
- Executive producer: George Eckstein
- Producer: Howie Horwitz
- Running time: 90 min
- Production company: Universal Television

Original release
- Network: NBC
- Release: March 20, 1972 – March 12, 1974

Related
- NBC Mystery Movie

Banacek is an American television series starring George Peppard that aired on NBC from 1972 to 1974. The series was part of the rotating NBC Wednesday Mystery Movie anthology. It alternated in its time slot with several other shows, but was the only one of them to last beyond its first season.

== Premise ==
Peppard played Thomas Banacek, a Polish-American freelance, Boston-based insurance investigator who solves seemingly impossible thefts. He collects from the insurance companies 10% of the insured value of the recovered property. One of Banacek's verbal signatures is the quotation of strangely worded yet curiously cogent "Polish proverbs" that Ralph Manza, as Banacek's chauffeur Jay Drury, rarely understand. Banacek also has a running agreement with his chauffeur for a 10% share of Banacek's 10% if he solved the crime. Mr. Drury is never at a loss for a potential solution that Banacek always manages to shoot down with his very next line. Another recurring gag is for other characters—particularly his rivals—to mispronounce his name deliberately. The name "Banaczek" (as pronounced in the show) is actually quite rare in Poland.

Murray Matheson plays seller of rare books and information source Felix Mulholland. He is also the series' only character to ever call Banacek by his first name.

Recurring characters include insurance company executive Cavanaugh (George Murdock), Banacek's rival and sometime love interest Carlie Kirkland (Christine Belford), and another insurance investigator/rival Fennyman/Henry DeWitt (Linden Chiles).

Banacek lives on historic Beacon Hill in Boston. While he has a limousine and driver, he also owns and sometimes drives an antique 1941 Packard convertible. Both vehicles are equipped with mobile radio telephones at a time when such devices are uncommon and expensive. Banacek is intelligent, well-educated, cultured, and suave. An unapologetic ladies' man who enjoys the company of beautiful women, he is also street-smart and can engage in hand-to-hand combat when the need arises; in one episode he mentions having learned judo in the Marine Corps, which is probably a reference to George Peppard's two-year enlistment in the Marine Corps, being discharged at the rank of corporal. He grew up in Scollay Square and a childhood acquaintance described him as the neighborhood jock who excelled in all sports. For recreation he jogs, plays squash, engages in weekend touch football, and sculling on the Charles River.

== Cast ==
- George Peppard as Thomas Banacek
- Ralph Manza as Jay Drury
- Murray Matheson as Felix Mulholland
- Christine Belford as Carlie Kirkland
- George Murdock as Cavanaugh

== Production ==
In general, the series was shot on the Universal Studios backlot, though location scenes were filmed around Los Angeles in areas that could pass for Boston, or rural areas near there. The episode titled "If Max Is So Smart, Why Doesn't He Tell Us Where He Is?" was shot on location at the California Institute of the Arts around the time the school first opened. "Ten Thousand Dollars a Page" was filmed at the Pasadena Art Museum, later known as the Pasadena Museum of Modern Art and now the Norton Simon Museum of Art. "Horse of a Slightly Different Color" was filmed at Hollywood Park Racetrack, now the site of SoFi Stadium.

A customized 1969 American Motors AMX was built by George Barris for the second regular-season episode. The car became known as the AMX-400 and it is now owned by an automobile collector. Other continuing cars in the series were a 1941 maroon Packard 180 with a Victoria body designed by Howard "Dutch" Darrin (license plate number 178344), a 1973 Corvette (driven by Ms. Kirkland) and a 1973 Cadillac Fleetwood limousine (mobile telephone number KL 17811). In keeping with both the exotic car theme and the humor between Banacek and his driver Jay Drury, he was even chauffeured around in a Willys MB, Jeep CJ2A, and a CJ6, as well as a brand new Ford/De Tomaso Pantera. Two Packards were used in filming, a 1941 used for principal photography and a modified 1942 model used for some shots in Los Angeles. The main 1941 picture car was auctioned in 2019 by RM Sotheby's for $373,500.

In preparation for the pilot and then the first and second seasons, the cast went to Boston and filmed a variety of background scenes. These scenes were then used through the series and are especially shown in the opening scenes, including Banacek rowing on the Charles River and walking through Government Center. In the pilot, Banacek's car pulls into his Beacon Hill home, the historic Second Harrison Gray Otis House located at 85 Mount Vernon Street. In other episodes, views are shown of the Public Garden, the entry to Felix's bookstore at 50 Beacon Street, and the Esplanade. The Boston-filmed pieces were done by a second unit and directed by Peppard himself.

== Reception ==
Although the show had a mixture of humor and rather intricate plots, it never generated strong ratings. Despite this, the show was well received by critics. In addition, the Polish American Congress gave the series an award for portraying Polish Americans in a good manner. It also helped revive Peppard's career.

== Cancellation ==
Banacek was well received by television critics, and, as a result, was picked up for a third season. However, before the third season could start, Peppard quit the show to prevent his ex-wife Elizabeth Ashley from receiving a larger percentage of his earnings as part of their divorce settlement. The complication ended any chance of reviving Banacek during Peppard's lifetime. A&E continued rebroadcasts of Banacek in syndication.

Both seasons of Banacek have been released on DVD under the TV Guide Presents banner.

Season one was released on 2007 with Season two following in 2008

== In popular culture ==
The mentalist Steven Shaw adopted his stage name "Banachek" after the television program.

The show was referenced by the band Fun Lovin' Criminals in the lyrics of its 1998 single "Love Unlimited".

"Banacek" is the name of the special effects technician in "Cry of the Cat," a very meta two-part episode of the Goosebumps TV series from 1998.

The character Banacek was also referenced in The Simpsons "Treehouse of Horror III" segment "Dial Z for Zombies" when Bart tries to cast a spell to rid Springfield of the zombies he unleashed by intoning the magic words "Kojak, Mannix, Banacek, Danno..." (All names of 1970s TV detectives.)

In 2018, Banacek was the subject of an episode-length parody in The Simpsons ("Homer Is Where the Art Isn't"), with Bill Hader voicing the Peppard character, named "Manacek". The episode is patterned closely after a typical Banacek outing, referencing items from the series' storytelling format to its establishing shots. The opening and closing credits mimicked Banacek's style, even including Goldenberg's theme music. In the Akron Beacon Journal, Rich Heldenfels called the episode "a dead-on parody of Banacek."

Banacek has a clear resemblance to the title character of the Steve McQueen movie The Thomas Crown Affair, particularly in his attitude towards women and authority. The house used for exterior shots of Thomas Crown's home in Boston, the Harrison Gray Otis House, was used for Banacek's home in the series. Both the film and the show revolve around insurance investigations, but in the series Banacek is solving crimes, not committing them.

In the 22nd episode of the second season of Everybody Hates Chris in 2006, the character Greg dresses up as Banacek and mentions the character by name.

== Episodes ==
=== Pilot: 1972 ===
Title	Directed by	Written by	Original release date
"Banacek: Detour to Nowhere"	Jack Smight	Anthony Wilson	20 March 1972
Banacek finds himself up against his old adversary, corporate insurance investigator McKinney of the National Meridian Insurance Company, when a missing armored truck with $1,600,000 of gold bullion disappears without a trace while under a police escort from Texas to Oklahoma.

=== Season 1: 1972–73 ===
No. overall	No. in season	Title	Directed by	Written by	Original release date
1	1	"Let's Hear It for a Living Legend"	Jack Smight	Del Reisman	13 September 1972
Banacek is called in after a football player vanishes on national TV and is held for ransom. Guest stars Stefanie Powers, Anitra Ford and John Brodie.
2	2	"Project Phoenix"	Richard T. Heffron	David Moessinger	27 September 1972
Banacek investigates the disappearance of a prototype automobile from a moving train's flatcar (an idea borrowed from a Thorpe Hazell short story). Guest stars William Windom, Joanna Pettet, Bert Convy.
3	3	"No Sign of the Cross"	Daryl Duke	Robert Presnell Jr., Howard Browne	11 October 1972
Banacek searches for a jewel encrusted, gold cross, donated by a dying Italian mobster, that disappears in transit from Mexico to a Los Angeles parish. Guest stars Broderick Crawford, Louise Sorel, Victor Jory, Jack MacGowran, Peter Donat
4	4	"A Million the Hard Way"	Bernard L. Kowalski	Stanley Ralph Ross	1 November 1972
A million dollars in $1000 bills seems to vanish from a sealed Las Vegas casino display. Guest star Margot Kidder; writer Stanley Ralph Ross appears as Larry Fields.
5	5	"To Steal a King"	Lou Antonio	Stephen Kandel	15 November 1972
Banacek searches for a $3 million collection of historical coins that vanishes from a Boston hotel-room vault. Guest stars Kevin McCarthy, Brenda Vaccaro, Pernell Roberts, Roger C. Carmel, Janis Paige.
6	6	"Ten Thousand Dollars a Page"	Richard T. Heffron	Paul Playdon	10 January 1973
A business tyrant loans his greatest personal treasure, a gift from his dead wife, to a local museum; the $1 million text disappears from a highly secured room. Guest stars Stella Stevens, David Doyle, George Lindsey, David Wayne, Ted Cassidy.
7	7	"The Greatest Collection of Them All"	George McCowan	Theodore J. Flicker	24 January 1973
A $23 million Impressionist charity art-exhibit disappears during shipment back to Boston from NYC via tractor trailer. Guest stars Penny Fuller, Mike Farrell, Penny Marshall, Garry Walberg.
8	8	"The Two Million Clams of Cap'n Jack"	Richard T. Heffron	Stanley Ralph Ross, Shirl Hendryx, Pat Fielder, Richard Bluel	7 February 1973
Plates used in the printing of stock certificates vanish. Guest stars Andrew Duggan, Jessica Walter, David White.

=== Season 2: 1973–74 ===
No. overall	No. in season	Title	Directed by	Written by	Original release date
9	1	"No Stone Unturned"	Richard T. Heffron	Stephen Lord, Robert Van Scoyk, Lee Santley, George Sheldon Smith	3 October 1973
Banacek must locate a three-ton statue that disappeared. Guest stars Candy Clark, Scott Brady, Gary Lockwood.
10	2	"If Max Is So Smart, Why Doesn't He Tell Us Where He Is?"	Bernard L. Kowalski	Robert Van Scoyk	7 November 1973
A huge medical computer vanishes from its secure building. Guest stars Anne Baxter, Richard Jordan, Sabrina Scharf.
11	3	"The Three Million Dollar Piracy"	Andrew McLaglen	Stanley Ralph Ross, Robert Van Scoyk, Jack Turley	21 November 1973
An expensive wedding coach is stolen from the hold of a ship. Guest stars Christine Belford, Arlene Martel.
12	4	"The Vanishing Chalice"	Bernard L. Kowalski	Morton Fine	15 January 1974
An ancient chalice disappears from a museum during the unveiling. Guest stars Cesar Romero, John Saxon.
13	5	"Horse of a Slightly Different Color"	Herschel Daugherty	Harold Livingston, Jimmy Sangster	22 January 1974
A racehorse disappears from the track. Guest stars Anne Francis, Terry Wilson, Lane Bradbury, Harry Carey, Jr.
14	6	"Rocket to Oblivion"	Andrew McLaglen	Robert Van Scoyk	12 February 1974
A prototype rocket engine vanishes during a private showing. Guest star Linda Evans.
15	7	"Fly Me — If You Can Find Me"	Bernard L. Kowalski	Harold Livingston	19 February 1974
After an emergency landing, an airliner vanishes. Guest stars Sterling Hayden, Victoria Principal.
16	8	"Now You See Me, Now You Don't"	Bernard McEveety	Stanley Roberts	12 March 1974
A stage magician, suspected of grand larceny, disappears during his act — but for real. Guest stars Gretchen Corbett, Peter Marshall.

== Home media ==
Arts Alliance America has released the entire series on DVD in Region 1. Season one was released on May 15, 2007, without the series pilot. Season two was released on January 22, 2008, and included the pilot episode. On September 30, 2008, Arts Alliance released Banacek: The Complete Series, a five-disc box set featuring all 17 episodes.

In Region 2, Fabulous Films released both seasons on DVD in the UK on February 10, 2014.

In Region 4, Madman Entertainment has released both seasons on DVD in Australia.

== See also ==
List of The NBC Mystery Movie episodes
