= Tenafly (TV series) =

- Genre: Drama
- Created by: Richard Levinson; William Link
- Directed by: Richard Colla
- Starring: James McEachin
- Country of origin: United States
- Original language: English
- No. of seasons: 1
- No. of episodes: 5

Production
- Running time: 90 mins.
- Production company: Universal Television

Original release
- Network: NBC
- Release: October 10, 1973 – January 2, 1974

Related
- The NBC Mystery Movie

Tenafly is a crime-drama series starring James McEachin that was part of The NBC Wednesday Mystery Movie wheel for the 1973-74 season. It was created by Richard Levinson and William Link, the creators of popular mystery television shows such as Columbo and Murder, She Wrote. It was one of the first television series that season to feature an African-American character as the protagonist (the other being Shaft starring Richard Roundtree). Due to low ratings, NBC removed Tenafly from the wheel when it moved the mid-week Mystery Movie block to Tuesdays in January 1974 (the Mystery Movie block itself would only air on Sundays starting in the 1974-75 season).

== Overview ==
The show was set in Los Angeles and starred James McEachin as Harry Tenafly, a former cop who left the department for a better-paying job at a large private investigation agency, Hightower Investigations, Inc. Unlike many TV private eyes of the era, Harry Tenafly was a happily married, middle-class, suburban family man; he preferred to avoid car chases and gunfights and used brains over brawn in solving his cases. Though he left the force for the private sector to avoid the dangers inherent in police work, trouble nonetheless seemed to find Tenafly.

== Cast ==
- James McEachin as Harry Tenafly
- Lillian Lehman as Ruth Tenafly
- Paul Jackson as Herb Tenafly
- David Huddleston as Lieutenant Sam Church
- Rosanna Huffman as Lorrie

== Episodes ==
No.	Title	Directed by	Written by	Original release date
0	"Pilot"	Richard A. Colla	Richard Levinson & William Link	February 12, 1973
Private investigator Harry Tenafly (James McEachin) investigates two separate cases: the disappearance of his uncle and the murder of the wife of a caustic radio talk show host (Ed Nelson).
1	"Joyride to Nowhere"	Robert Day	Booker Bradshaw & David P. Lewis	October 10, 1973
2	"The Cash and Carry Caper"	Unknown	Unknown	October 31, 1973
3	"The Window That Wasn't"	Unknown	Unknown	December 5, 1973
Tenafly attempts to find out whether a young girl is telling the truth after she claims to have witnessed a murder.
4	"Man Running"	Unknown	Unknown	January 2, 1974
A parking attendant uses his job to duplicate keys to houses he later robs.

== See also ==
- List of The NBC Mystery Movie episodes
