= The NBC Mystery Movie =

American television anthology series

- Genre: Movie of the week
- Theme music composer: Henry Mancini
- Country of origin: United States
- Original language: English
- No. of episodes: (list of episodes)

Production
- Running time: 90 minutes (1971–1974, 1976–1977); 120 minutes (1974–1976)

Original release
- Network: NBC
- Release: 1971 – 1977

Related
- Amy Prentiss; Banacek; Columbo; Cool Million; Faraday & Company; Hec Ramsey; Lanigan's Rabbi; Madigan; McCloud; McCoy; McMillan & Wife; Quincy, M.E.; The Snoop Sisters; Tenafly

The NBC Mystery Movie is an American television anthology series produced by Universal Pictures and broadcast on NBC from 1971 to 1977. Devoted to a rotating series of mystery episodes, it was sometimes split into two subsets broadcast on different nights of the week: The NBC Sunday Mystery Movie and The NBC Wednesday Mystery Movie.

The NBC Mystery Movie was a "wheel series", also called an "umbrella program", that rotated several programs within the same period throughout each of its seasons. During the first season of 1971–72, three detective dramas were broadcast on Wednesday nights from 8:30 to 10:00 p.m. in the Eastern and Pacific time zones (7:30–9:00 p.m. Central and Mountain time).

== Background ==
The origin of the "wheel" format was a joint programming and creative production agreement between the NBC Television Network and Universal Studios Television and Motion Pictures in 1966, in accord with which NBC ordered a multi-year series of dramatic anthology productions from Universal that NBC would broadcast in the United States (both as originals and re-runs), with Universal retaining exclusive rights to overseas release of these productions as feature-length films, while NBC could not offer them as TV re-runs internationally.

The first series created under this agreement was The Name of the Game, a drama with three rotating stars. It was followed by The Bold Ones and Four in One (the similar The Men was produced for ABC and involved series from three studios, although one of them was Universal). While it was a long and profitable collaboration, it finally succumbed to the changes of the commercial broadcast market regarding both structure and content by the end of the decade.

By the late 1970s, the increasing popularity of situation comedies, coupled with their lower production costs and much greater scheduling flexibility and resale opportunities, surpassed that of these feature-length (90–120 minute) drama anthologies. The anthologies could not reasonably be reduced for shorter broadcast times for the re-run market. They were not designed for casual or short-term viewers, who would have little interest in the characters or the story of an individual episode. Each episode and each series were of widely varying quality, making package re-sale difficult. However, by the early 1980s, various movie episodes from the former Mystery Movie series were rebroadcast on late night's The CBS Late Movie as a package with an earlier half-hour situation comedy series rerun. While they lasted, the best of them employed the finest actors, writers and production standards available.

== Production history ==
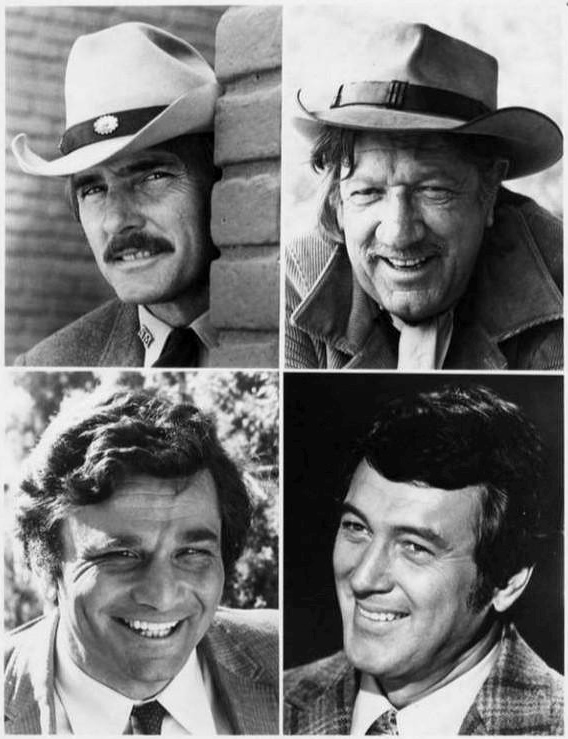
The NBC Sunday Mystery Movie program worked on a rotating basis - one per month from each of its shows. Top left: Dennis Weaver in McCloud. Top right: Richard Boone in Hec Ramsey. Bottom left: Peter Falk in Columbo. Bottom right: Rock Hudson (photo minus his new hep trademark mustache) in McMillan & Wife.

=== Inaugural programs ===
The three original series from the 1971–1972 season of The NBC Mystery Movie were:

- McCloud, starring Dennis Weaver as a rural lawman from Taos, New Mexico temporarily assigned to the New York City Police Department (NYPD). Inspired by the Clint Eastwood 1968 film Coogan's Bluff, the show debuted the previous season as part of the hour-long NBC wheel show Four in One.
- Columbo, starring Peter Falk as a seemingly inept Los Angeles homicide detective. The series was derived from a 1968 made-for-television movie, Prescription: Murder, which starred Falk in the same role.
- McMillan & Wife, starring Rock Hudson and Susan Saint James as a husband-and-wife crime-fighting duo. Hudson's character was a hip, sophisticated San Francisco city police commissioner. After Saint James's departure in 1976, the series was renamed McMillan.

The umbrella series was counted a great success in its first season and finished at number 14 in the Nielsen ratings for the 1971–1972 season. Columbo was nominated for eight Emmy Awards and won four categories. This prompted NBC to move the series to the competitive 8:30-10:00 Sunday evening time period for the second season as The NBC Sunday Mystery Movie. In addition, a fourth show was added to the rotation, lasting two seasons (1972–1974):

- Hec Ramsey, starring Richard Boone as a gunfighter turned frontier forensic science detective in the Old West. This series was produced by Jack Webb.

=== The NBC Wednesday Mystery Movie programs ===
==== Inaugural ====
NBC also launched a clone of the umbrella series, The NBC Wednesday Mystery Movie, which debuted in the original time period and featured three new programs:

- Banacek, starring George Peppard as Thomas Banacek, a free-lance Polish-American insurance investigator in Boston. Like Hec Ramsey, it lasted two seasons (1972–1974).
- Cool Million, starring James Farentino as a former CIA agent turned private investigator and security/retrieval expert whose fee per case was one million dollars.
- Madigan had Richard Widmark reprising his 1968 film role as a streetwise veteran detective of the New York City Police Department.

==== Subsequent ====
During the 1973–1974 season, the programs rotating on Sunday remained the same, while on Wednesday, Cool Million and Madigan were canceled and Banacek rotated with three new series:

- Faraday & Company, starring Dan Dailey as a private detective who returns to Los Angeles after a quarter century in a South American jail.
- Tenafly, starring James McEachin as an African-American private detective.
- The Snoop Sisters, starring Helen Hayes and Mildred Natwick as two elderly sisters who routinely found mysteries which they solved.

Rescheduling to Tuesday nights as The NBC Tuesday Mystery Movie during January 1974 was not enough to help boost ratings, and the midweek series was canceled. The Sunday series continued, anchored by the popular trio of Columbo, McCloud, and McMillan and Wife.

=== Later changes ===
During subsequent years, these rotated with a fourth series, which changed each year (1974–1977), including:

- Amy Prentiss, starring Jessica Walter as the fictional first female chief of detectives for the San Francisco Police Department. This series was a spinoff of Ironside.
- McCoy, starring Tony Curtis as a professional con-man/thief.
- Quincy, M.E., starring Jack Klugman as a medical examiner in the L.A. County Coroner's office.
- Lanigan's Rabbi, about a small-town police chief (Art Carney) and his best friend, a rabbi and amateur sleuth (Bruce Solomon), based on Harry Kemelman's popular Rabbi Small mysteries.

Additionally, the two-hour pilot of another Universal mystery series, Ellery Queen: Too Many Suspects, aired in the usual Sunday timeslot of the Mystery Movie on March 23, 1975; it was promoted as an NBC Mystery Movie Special. (The resulting series began airing that September, but in a Thursday night timeslot, and not under the NBC Mystery Movie umbrella.)

Of all the wheel series, only the original three — Columbo, McCloud and McMillan & Wife — survived for the entire run of the Mystery Movie. Most of the others were short-lived and, with the exception of Hec Ramsey and Banacek, were on the air for only one season. Quincy, M.E., which was the next-to-last new Mystery Movie series to premiere, outlasted the parent series itself; midway through the final Mystery Movie season, Quincy was retooled into a one-hour weekly series that ran for six more seasons, until 1983.

Although the Mystery Movie series was cancelled at the end of the 1976–1977 season, NBC kept Columbo in production, and a seventh season consisting of five films premiered on November 21, 1977. NBC cancelled Columbo in 1978.

== Presentation ==
The NBC Mystery Movie theme music was composed by Henry Mancini.

The opening credits consisted of a shadowed figure carrying a flashlight slowly walking toward the camera in a desert landscape under dramatically lit clouds, as images of the various rotating series appeared sequentially on the screen; at the end, an announcer (Hank Simms) presented the night's main actors and series (example: "tonight, starring Peter Falk as Columbo"). To keep viewers from guessing which detective would be featured that night, the first detective pictured in the intro was always the detective of that evening's episode. Some syndicated episodes of Columbo retain this opening credit sequence, though the original title caption which included "NBC" and (after the first season), a day of the week was instead replaced by a similar graphic, simply showing multiple colored filmstrips with "MYSTERY" written within the frames, scrolling upwards within a circle (in the original animation, some of these filmstrips contained the NBC logo, and they scrolled upwards at a faster pace), alternatively, the portion of the introduction featuring Columbo replaced the original NBC-branded end graphic. Some syndicated reruns of other Mystery Movie shows retained the intro, but simply faded away before the NBC-branded opening graphic could be shown.

The NBC Wednesday Mystery Movie theme was composed by Quincy Jones for its first season and had an animated open to show the lineup.

== Post-series ==
=== ABC Mystery Movie ===
In 1989, Universal Television and ABC teamed to launch a revival of the mystery wheel, titled the ABC Monday Mystery Movie. The network brought back original Mystery Movie series Columbo to be part of the wheel, with Peter Falk returning in the title role. Two new series joined Columbo in its first year, Gideon Oliver, starring Louis Gossett Jr. as a crime solving anthropologist, and B.L. Stryker, which featured Burt Reynolds as a South Florida private investigator. It was originally meant to be on Saturdays, but moved to Mondays amidst production delays related to the 1988 Writers Guild of America strike.

Columbo and B.L. Stryker continued in the wheel's second season on Saturday (as ABC Saturday Mystery Movie) with two other series in August 1989: the new Christine Cromwell, a San Francisco based mystery starring Jaclyn Smith, and a revival of CBS' 1970s crime drama Kojak. The wheel series ran irregularly from February 1989 until August 1990. After the ABC Saturday Mystery Movie ended, ABC kept Columbo in production and Falk starred in an additional fourteen episodes before the network discontinued the series in 2003.

Universal brought McCloud back for a reunion film in 1989. The film, titled The Return of Sam McCloud, featured Dennis Weaver in the role of United States Senator Sam McCloud. However, unlike the television series, the reunion film aired on CBS.

The ABC Mystery Movie theme was composed by Mike Post.

=== Friday Night Mystery ===
In the fall of 1993, NBC made an attempt to revive the wheel format, this time called The NBC Friday Night Mystery. This rotation included:

- MacShayne starring Kenny Rogers as a gambler turned house detective to pay his debts.
- Hart to Hart, a revival starring Robert Wagner and Stefanie Powers.
- Staying Afloat starring Larry Hagman as a former millionaire who becomes a jet-setting government operative.
- The Cosby Mysteries, a telefilm starring Bill Cosby that was spun off into a weekly one-hour series for the 1994 season.
- A continuation of the Perry Mason telefilms that were already airing on NBC. When star Raymond Burr died after filming only the first of six scheduled films for the series, NBC retitled the series A Perry Mason Mystery and cast Paul Sorvino as Anthony Caruso, a close friend of Mason, to continue the series in a second film with an option for one more. Three subsequent films aired starring Hal Holbrook as “Wild Bill” McKenzie.
- Ray Alexander was a late addition starring Louis Gossett Jr. as Ray Alexander, a detective-restaurateur, with co-stars James Coburn and Ossie Davis. This series' first installment, A Taste for Justice, aired on May 13, 1994 with two more films planned. However, only one additional film, A Menu for Murder was filmed and aired the following season.

Promotional materials originally included a revival of the CBS telefilm series, Janek, which debuted in 1985 starring Richard Crenna as New York City Police Lieutenant of Detectives Frank Janek. An alleged feud between the two networks led to CBS demanding that NBC not proceed with production.

== In popular culture ==
- The cast of Mystery Science Theater 3000 would often make a recurring joke ("It's The NBC Mystery Movie!") whenever a character in a movie shined a flashlight. Eventually, at the beginning of the episode Teenagers from Outer Space, Joel has the robots in electrical shock therapy to try and break them of the habit.
- A 2008 episode of The Simpsons, "Dial 'N' for Nerder", ended with a reference to the NBC Mystery Movie opening sequence, featuring Nelson Muntz as Columbo, Dr. Hibbert as Quincy, Rich Texan as McCloud and Mr. Burns and Smithers as McMillan and Wife.
- In an episode of the cartoon King of the Hill, Elroy "Lucky" Kleinschmidt refers to Hec Ramsey as an under-appreciated part of the NBC Mystery Wheel.

== U.S. television ratings ==
The NBC Mystery Movie maintained high ratings finishing in the top 30 of shows for the first four seasons. The show rated as the following:

Television ratings
Show	TV season	Rank	Households (millions)
The NBC Mystery Movie	1971–1972	#14	14,40
The NBC Sunday Mystery Movie	1972–1973	#6	15,68
The NBC Sunday Mystery Movie	1973–1974	#14	14,69
The NBC Sunday Mystery Movie	1974–1975	#24	14,59
The NBC Sunday Mystery Movie	1975–1976	#53	N/A
The NBC Sunday Mystery Movie	1976–1977	#62	12,76
ABC Mystery Movie	1988–1989	#29	13,92
