= The Bait (1973 film) =

- Genre: Crime thriller
- Based on: The Bait by Dorothy Uhnak
- Teleplay by: Don M. Mankiewicz; Gordon Cotler
- Directed by: Leonard Horn
- Starring: Donna Mills; Michael Constantine; Bill Devane; Arlene Golonka; June Lockhart
- Music by: Jack Elliott; Allyn Ferguson
- Country of origin: United States
- Original language: English

Production
- Executive producers: Aaron Spelling; Leonard Goldberg
- Producer: Peter Nelson
- Cinematography: Gert Andersen
- Editors: Leon Carrere; Neil Travis
- Running time: 78 minutes
- Production companies: ABC Circle Films; Spelling-Goldberg Productions

Original release
- Network: ABC
- Release: March 13, 1973

The Bait is a 1973 American crime thriller television film about LAPD Detective Tracy Fleming, who is out to catch a serial killer and rapist preying on women in Los Angeles. Filmed in 1971 and released in 1973, it stars Donna Mills. The film was based on former police officer Dorothy Uhnak's first novel, also titled The Bait, which won the MWA's Edgar for Best First Novel. She was reportedly embarrassed over the liberties taken with her work by this film. The film itself was the pilot for an unlaunched weekly TV series.

The Ledger, a later book by Ms. Uhnak featuring the same character, NYPD Detective Christie Opara, was adapted into the TV-film Get Christie Love! It also took liberties with the source material, but was, nonetheless, successfully turned into a TV series the following season.

== Cast ==
- Donna Mills as Tracy Fleming
- Michael Constantine as Captain Gus Maryk
- Arlene Golonka as Liz Fowler
- William Devane as Earl Stokey
- June Lockhart as Nora
- Noam Pitlik as Solomon
- Gianni Russo as Gianni Ruggeri
- Thalmus Rasulala as Eddie Nugent
- Mitzi Hoag as Nancy
- Brad Savage as Mickey

== See also ==
- List of American films of 1973
