= Martin Lawlor (hurler) =

Irish hurler

Personal information
- Native name: Máirtín Ó Leathlobhair (Irish)
- Born: 1 November 1896 Three Castles, County Kilkenny, Ireland
- Died: 19 May 1979 (aged 82) Ballyragget, County Kilkenny, Ireland
- Occupation: Farmer

Sport
- Sport: Hurling
- Position: Left corner-back
Club
- Years: Club
- Tulla
Club titles
- Kilkenny titles: 0
Inter-county
- Years: County
- 1921–1925: Kilkenny
Inter-county titles
- Leinster titles: 3
- All-Irelands: 1

Martin Lawlor (1 November 1896 – 19 May 1979), also known as Martin Lalor, was an Irish hurler. Usually lining out as at corner-back, he was a member of the Kilkenny team that won the 1922 All-Ireland Championship.

Lawlor hailed from a family that had a strong association with hurling. His close relatives, Martin and Jim Lalor, were renowned hurley makers and both won back-to-back All-Ireland medals in 1904 and 1905.

Lawlor enjoyed a lengthy career with Tulla, however, he enjoyed little in terms of championship success.

After being selected for the Kilkenny senior team in 1921, Lawlor was a regular member of the team for the subsequent five championship seasons. He won his first Leinster medal in 1922 before later winning his sole All-Ireland medal after Kilkenny's defeat of Tipperary in the final. Lawlor won further Leinster medals in 1923 and 1925.

Lalwor died on 19 May 1979.

== Honours ==
Kilkenny

- All-Ireland Senior Hurling Championship (1): 1922
- Leinster Senior Hurling Championship (3): 1922, 1923, 1925
