= Martin Lawlor =

Martin Lawlor may refer to:

- Martin Lawlor (hurler)
- Martin Lawlor (labor unionist)
