= Penny Peyser =

American actress (b. 1951)

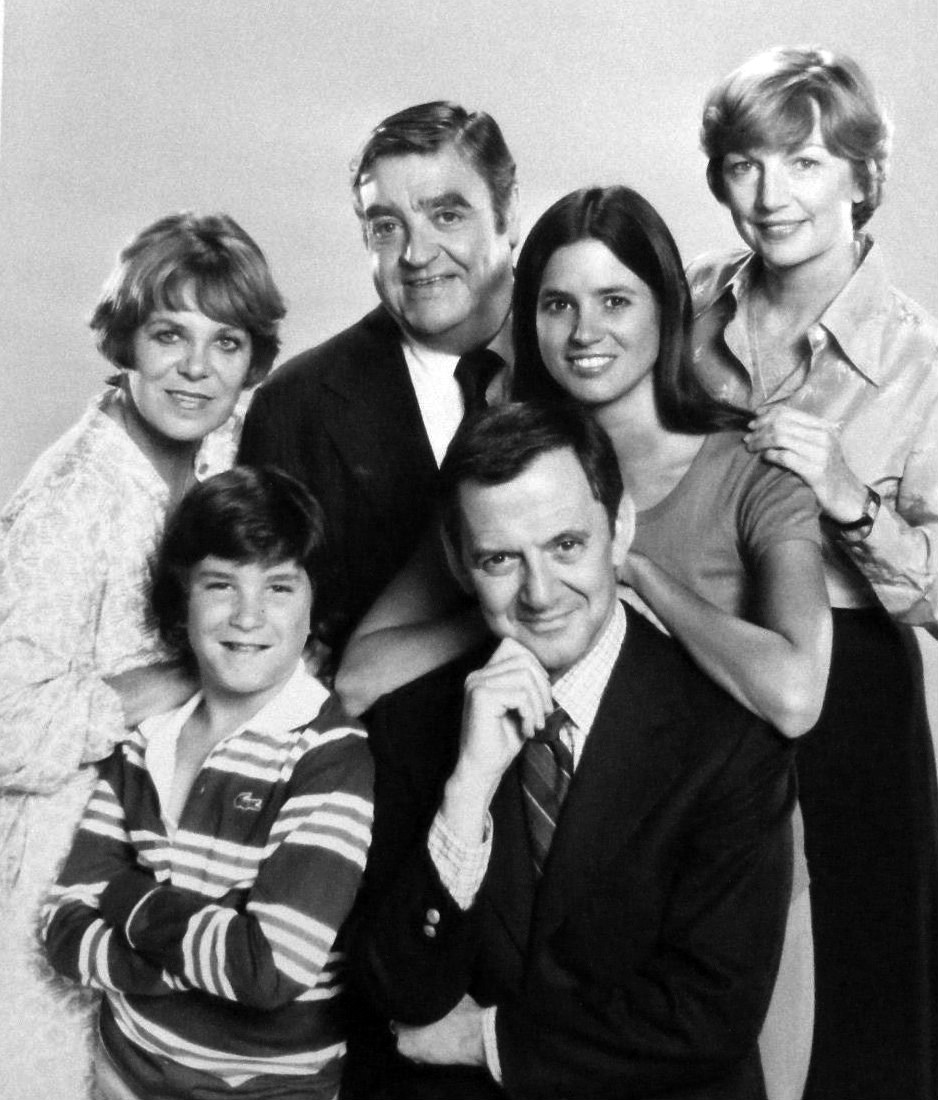
- Front, L-R: Brad Savage, Tony Randall. Back: Rachel Roberts, Barney Martin, Penny Peyser, and Allyn Ann McLerie on The Tony Randall Show (1977)
- Born: Irvington, New York, US
- Education: Emerson College
- Occupations: Writer; actress; filmmaker
- Years active: 1976–present
- Known for: Rich Man, Poor Man Book II; The Blue and the Gray; Crazy like a Fox; The In-Laws; The Frisco Kid
- Spouses: James Carroll Jordan (m. 1977; div. 1984) Doug McIntyre (m. 2002)
- Father: Peter Peyser

Penny Peyser is an American actress, writer, and filmmaker.

== Early life ==
Peyser was born in Irvington, New York, and attended Irvington High School, where she starred in student musical theatre productions. She is the daughter of Marguerite (née Richards) and Peter A. Peyser. At the time, her father was mayor of Irvington; he then became a five-term United States Congressman in the late 1970s and early 1980s.

Peyser was attracted to acting when, at the age of six, she saw Julie Andrews in My Fair Lady. Peyser performed in high school productions of The Boy Friend and Bye Bye Birdie. She told Bruce Kimmel in an interview that she enjoyed singing and acting throughout grade school:

My triumph was in sixth grade when I decided to insert a musical number in our non-musical production of Oliver Twist. I was playing the Artful Dodger and couldn't resist the opportunity to sing Consider Yourself along with a self-choreographed tap dance. Now that really brought the house down and imagine the director's surprise.
High school – I was a theatre geek with a minor in field hockey. Bye Bye Birdie, The Boyfriend, Born Yesterday – wouldn't you have loved to see me in the Judy Holiday role?

Peyser began higher education at Skidmore College, where she majored in theater and performed the lead in Lysistrata ("while still a virgin and knowing not of what I spoke"), then transferred to Emerson College in Boston. At Emerson, she continued to study drama and acted in Sam Shepard's La Turista, among other plays. After graduating in 1973 with a degree in theater, she made her professional debut by joining a Boston improv group called The Proposition. Peyser told an interviewer, "They'd take suggestions from the audience and turn them into skits. It was the most high-pressured job I ever had and the lowest paying. I figured it couldn't get any worse than that. After that, I went to New York and began my waitressing career."

Peyser did indeed work as a waitress in Manhattan. She also gained experience as "a glorified chorus girl" in Off-Broadway productions such as Diamond Studs, and performed in the original production of Lanford Wilson's The Hot l Baltimore, and well as, more recently, in Ethel Sings - The Unsung Song of Ethel Rosenberg at the Off-Broadway Samuel Beckett Theatre.

== Film and television acting ==
Peyser moved to Hollywood upon landing a minor role in All the President's Men. Robert Redford, who produced and starred in the film, objected to casting a politician's daughter, but she informed Redford that her father was a liberal Republican who had criticized Richard Nixon, and she got the part.

Two months later, she was cast as Ramona Scott in Rich Man, Poor Man Book II. Peyser then replaced Devon Scott in the role of Roberta Franklin for the second season of The Tony Randall Show, her first regular TV role. She also appeared in smaller guest roles in numerous TV series, including B. J. and the Bear, Barnaby Jones, The Incredible Hulk, Knight Rider, The A-Team, The Fall Guy, Tour of Duty, Quantum Leap, L.A. Law, MacGyver , Criminal Minds, and The Mentalist. Peyser worked with Paul Bartel and Steven Spielberg in a 1986 episode of Amazing Stories, of which she was the star. She co-starred as Tracy Beaumont in the 1979 TV movie The Girls in the Office and also starred as Emma Gayser Bedell in the 1982 TV mini-series The Blue and the Gray.

For two seasons, Peyser appeared in the role of Cindy Fox in the 1984-86 CBS series Crazy Like a Fox.

Her other feature films include The In-Laws and The Frisco Kid, both released in 1979.

Peyser continued acting in theater in Los Angeles, in which she portrayed the lead role in A Moment in the Sun, Red Flags and The Twilight of the Golds.

Peyser has written for the Los Angeles Times as well as other publications.

== Filmmaking ==
Peyser co-produced, wrote and directed the documentary Trying to Get Good: The Jazz Odyssey of Jack Sheldon (2008). It features interviews with Clint Eastwood, Billy Crystal, Merv Griffin, Chris Botti, Dave Frishberg, Tierney Sutton and others. The film won jury and audience prizes at the Nashville Film Festival, the Newport Beach Film Festival, the Indianapolis International Film Festival and the Kansas City Filmmakers Jubilee.

She also wrote, produced, filmed, and directed the feature documentary Stillpoint: Life Inside a Zen Community (2014) about a community in the hills above Santa Cruz, California of which "Umi", British former radio deejay Tom Lodge, was the master, and Peyser's sister, Caroline, who is suffering from multiple sclerosis and was dubbed "Mouna" by Umi, was one of the members.

== Personal life ==
Peyser began dating James Carroll Jordan when they were working on Rich Man, Poor Man Book II together. Jordan told an interviewer that they fell in love during their eighth episode together. They were married in 1977, and divorced in 1984. They have a son, James Buckly Jordan, who is Managing Partner of Canyon Creek Capital.

Peyser is currently married to Doug McIntyre, who hosted the radio talk-show McIntyre in the Morning at KABC in Los Angeles.

== Filmography ==
=== Film ===
Year	Title	Role	Notes
1976	All the President's Men	Sharon Lyons	
1977	The Quinns	Laurie O'Neill	Television film
1979	The Girls in the Office	Tracy Beaumont	Television film
1979	The In-Laws	Barbara Kornpett	
1979	The Frisco Kid	Rosalie Bender	
1981	Two Reelers	The Girl	Television film
1983	Emergency Room	Nicky Tice	Television film
1984	Unfaithfully Yours	Jewelry Salesgirl	
1984	Pigs vs. Freaks	Janice Zimmer	Television film
1987	Still Crazy like a Fox	Cindy Fox	Television film
1988	Messenger of Death	Trudy Pike	
1993	Indecent Behavior	Samantha Morrow	A murder mystery starring Shannon Tweed.
1996	The Late Shift	Susan Binford	HBO television film
1996	Doomsday Virus	Lisa Erickson	Television film; also known as Pandora's Clock.
1997	Under Wraps	Amy's Mom	Disney Channel Original Movie.
1998	Freedom Strike	Linda	
2013	Snap	Mrs. Jacobs	Short film
2014	The Divorce Party	Carol	

=== Television ===
Year	Title	Role	Notes
1976–77	Rich Man, Poor Man Book II	Ramona Scott	Miniseries, main cast
1977	Switch	Sandy	Episode: "Three for the Money"
1977	The Hardy Boys/Nancy Drew Mysteries	Suzie Wilkins	Episode: "The Mystery of the Flying Courier"
1977–78	The Tony Randall Show	Roberta Franklin	Main cast (season 2)
1978	Having Babies		Episode: "Alien, Virgin, Workaholic"
1978	B. J. and the Bear	Stilts	Episode: "The Foundlings"
1978	Barnaby Jones	Sybil Crawford	Episode: "Stages of Fear"
1979	$weepstake$	Ludmilla	Episode: "Billy, Wally and Ludmilla, and Theodore"
1980	Wild Times	Libby Tyree	Miniseries, main cast
1980	The White Shadow		Episode: "Christmas Story"
1981	The Incredible Hulk	Lannie	Episode: "Two Godmothers"
1982	The Blue and the Gray	Emma Gayser	Miniseries, main cast
1982	Knight Rider	Cheryl Burns	Episode: "The Final Verdict"
1983	The Powers of Matthew Star	Lara Boston	Episode: "36 Hours"
1983	The A-Team	Laura Crenshaw	Episode: "Labor Pains"
1983	The Fall Guy	Meg Benton	Episode: "Dirty Laundry"
1984	Masquerade		Episode: "Caribbean Holiday"
1984–86	Crazy Like a Fox	Cindy Fox	Main cast
1986	Amazing Stories	Jane	Episode: "Secret Cinema"
1989	MacGyver	Mary Ruth Giordano	Episode: "The Battle of Tommy Giordano"
1989	Tour of Duty	Carol Anderson	3 episodes
1989–90	Knots Landing	Amanda Michaels	Recurring role (seasons 10–11)
1991	Quantum Leap	Attorney Nancy Hudson	Episode: "Raped – June 20, 1980"
1993	L.A. Law	Leslie Wheaton	Episode: "Safe Sex"
1997	Walker, Texas Ranger	Dr. Vera Haines	Episode: "Brainchild"
1998	7th Heaven	Dr. LaRoe	Episode: "The Legacy"
2009	Raising the Bar	Diana Ramsay	Episode: "Maybe, Baby"
2010	General Hospital	Realtor	Uncredited
2012	Criminal Minds	Dr. Linda Merrill	Episode: "Unknown Subject"
2012	The Mentalist	Female lawyer	Episode: "Ruby Slippers"
2013	Castle	Mrs. Albrook	Episode: "Watershed"
2014	The Mentalist	Laura Dubin / Linda Dubin	2 episodes
2017	NCIS	Judge Susan Delphy	Episode: "Burden of Proof"
2022	9-1-1	Older Woman	Episode: "Outside Looking In"
