= Teresa Graves =

American actress (1948–2002)

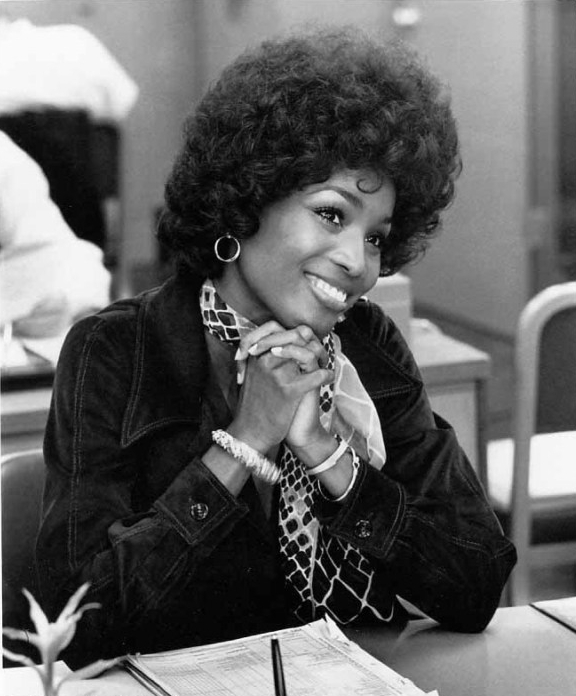
- Graves in Get Christie Love!, 1974
- Born: January 10, 1948; Houston, Texas, U.S.
- Died: October 10, 2002 (aged 54); Los Angeles, California, U.S.
- Other names: Theresa Graves; Tressa Graves
- Occupations: Actress; singer
- Years active: 1966–1983
- Known for: Det. Christie Love – Get Christie Love!
- Spouse: William D. Reddick (m. 1977; div. 1983)

Teresa Graves (January 10, 1948 – October 10, 2002) was an American actress and singer, best known for her starring role as undercover police detective Christie Love in the ABC crime-drama television series Get Christie Love! (1974–1975). The role made Graves the second Black American female to star in a non-stereotypical role for a U.S. drama television series. The first was Diahann Carroll in Julia, which aired 3 years earlier from 1968 to 1971. The Get Christie Love! series was based on Dorothy Uhnak's crime-thriller novel The Ledger.

== Career ==
=== Singing ===
Graves was born on January 10, 1948, the middle of three children in Houston, Texas to Marshall (1921–1967) and Willie Graves (1920–2005). The family moved to Los Angeles, California, when she was five. In high school she was a 4.0 student, active in both glee club and drama society; her senior class voted her "Most Talented". Her vocal talent brought her to the attention of the Doodletown Pipers founder George Wilkins in 1966. After graduating from George Washington Preparatory High School in 1966, Graves elected to take his offer to join the singing group over a fully paid music scholarship to USC. She spent the next three years touring North America with the Pipers. It was with the group that she made her initial television appearances. She also recorded a self-titled album in 1970.

=== Acting ===
She soon turned to acting and became a regular in the two variety shows: Our Place (1967) and the infamous single episode of Turn-On (1969). In 1969, Graves toured with Bob Hope's USO tour in Southeast Asia. Graves later landed more acting roles, becoming a regular on Rowan & Martin's Laugh-In during its third season. Graves appeared in several films. In the 1973 film That Man Bolt, in which she played Samantha Nightingale, Graves' character is shot to death when she is in bed during a love scene with Fred Williamson, who plays the leading role of Jefferson Bolt.

Graves pivotal role in the 1974 ABC crime drama television movie and later series Get Christie Love! featured Charles Cioffi and Jack Kelly as Lieutenants Reardon and Ryan, respectively, Love's supervisors. At the time of the series creation, Graves' was noted as the second Black American woman to star in her own hour–long television series, after Diahann Carroll in Julia which aired six years prior. An article in the November 1974 issue of Jet magazine described Graves as "television's most delightful detective, the epitome of a tough lady cop with more feminine features than Venus". In 1983, Graves retired from show business to devote her time to her faith.

== Personal life and death ==
Graves married William Reddick in 1977. They divorced in 1983. They had no children together. Graves was baptized as one of Jehovah's Witnesses in 1974, and almost immediately began using her celebrity to bring international awareness to the brutal persecution of Witnesses in Malawi under then-leader Hastings Kamuzu Banda's "one-party rule".

Due to moral conflicts with scripts and other aspects in the entertainment industry, Graves chose to retire from acting and performing in 1984. She then devoted all of her time to Jehovah's Witnesses activities. She resided at 3437 West 78th Place in the Hyde Park neighborhood in Los Angeles, California, where she cared for her mother. On October 10, 2002, Graves' home caught fire due to a faulty space heater. Graves was found unconscious in a bedroom before being rushed to the hospital where she later died. She was 54 years old.

== Acting roles ==
Year	Title	Role	Notes
1969	Turn-On	Regular Performer	1 episode
1969–1970	Rowan & Martin's Laugh-In	Regular Performer	26 episodes
1971	The Funny Side	Minority Wife	Unknown episodes
1972	Keeping Up with the Joneses		Television movie
1972	The New Dick Van Dyke Show	Nurse Allen	1 episode
1973	The Rookies	Susan Davis	1 episode
1973	That Man Bolt	Samantha Nightingale	
1974	Vampira	Countess Vampira	Alternative titles (USA): Old Dracula, Old Drac
1974	Black Eye	Cynthia	
1974	Get Christie Love!	Christie Love	Television movie
1974–1975	Get Christie Love!	Christie Love	22 episodes
1980	Noche de Gigantes	Herself / Guest	Chilean talk show, 1 episode
1982	Bob Hope's Women I Love: Beautiful But Funny	Herself / Guest	TV special

== Awards and nominations ==
Year	Award	Result	Category	Film or series
1975	Golden Globe Award	Nominated	Best TV Actress - Drama	Get Christie Love!
1977	TP de Oro	Won	Best Foreign Actress (Mejor Actriz Extranjera)	Get Christie Love!
