= Brad Savage =

American actor (b. 1965)

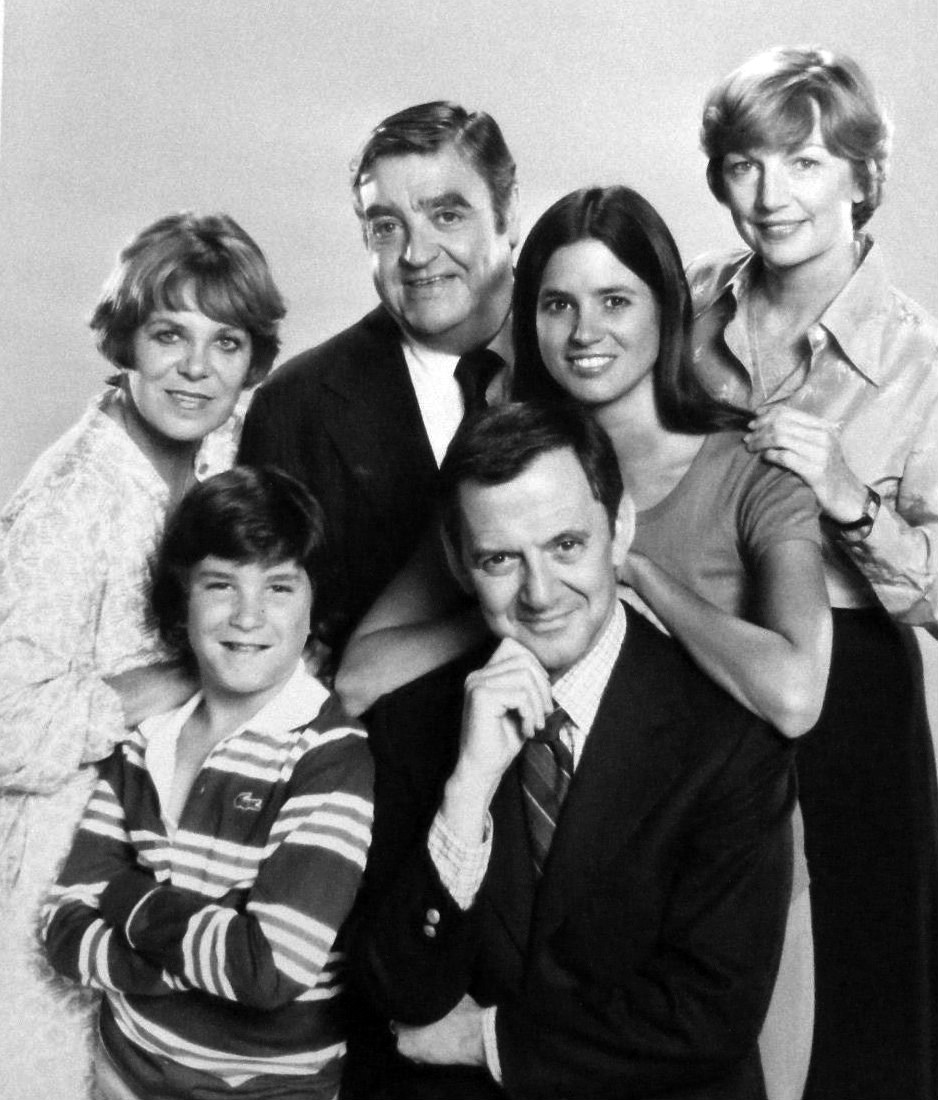
- Front, L-R: Brad Savage, Tony Randall. Back: Rachel Roberts, Barney Martin, Penny Peyser, and Allyn Ann McLerie on The Tony Randall Show (1977)
- Born: Brad Savage; December 9, 1965 (age 60); Livonia, Michigan, U.S.
- Occupations: Actor, singer
- Years active: 1967–2008

Brad Savage (born December 9, 1965) is an American former actor and singer best known for his role as Danny in the 1984 movie Red Dawn, for which he received a nomination for the Young Artist Award in the category "Best Young Supporting Actor in a Motion Picture Musical, Comedy, Adventure or Drama".

== Life and career ==
Savage was born in Livonia, Michigan in 1965. His mother, Judy, became a talent agent after Brad began his acting career. His sister, Tracie Savage, is an actor.

While known for Red Dawn, Savage also appeared in many television shows in the 1970s and 1980s, including Salem's Lot, CHiPs, Mork & Mindy, Emergency!, Fantasy Island, and The Love Boat.

He appeared in several other films including Two-Minute Warning; The Apple Dumpling Gang; Echoes of a Summer; No Deposit, No Return; Return from Witch Mountain and Islands in the Stream.

Savage currently plays bass guitar and sings in the celebrity group Band from TV with Greg Grunberg, Hugh Laurie, James Denton, Bob Guiney, Bonnie Somerville, and others.

== Family ==
Savage is married to Bronwen R. Craig and has two children. His son, Keaton Savage, is an actor.

== Filmography ==
Year	Title	Role	Notes
1973	The Bait	Mickey	ABC Movie of the Week
1975	The Apple Dumpling Gang	Clovis Bradley	Disney production
1975	The Other Side of the Mountain	Boy in Wheelchair	
1976	No Deposit, No Return	Jay	
1976	Echoes of a Summer	Philip	
1976	Two-Minute Warning	Ramsay Child	
1977	Islands in the Stream	Andrew	
1978	Return from Witch Mountain	Muscles	
1979	Salem's Lot	Danny Glick	TV movie from the novel by Stephen King
1984	Red Dawn	Danny	directed by John Milius

== Bibliography ==
- Holmstrom, John. The Moving Picture Boy: An International Encyclopaedia from 1895 to 1995. Norwich, Michael Russell, 1996, p. 357.
