= Mitzi Hoag =

American actress (1932–2019)

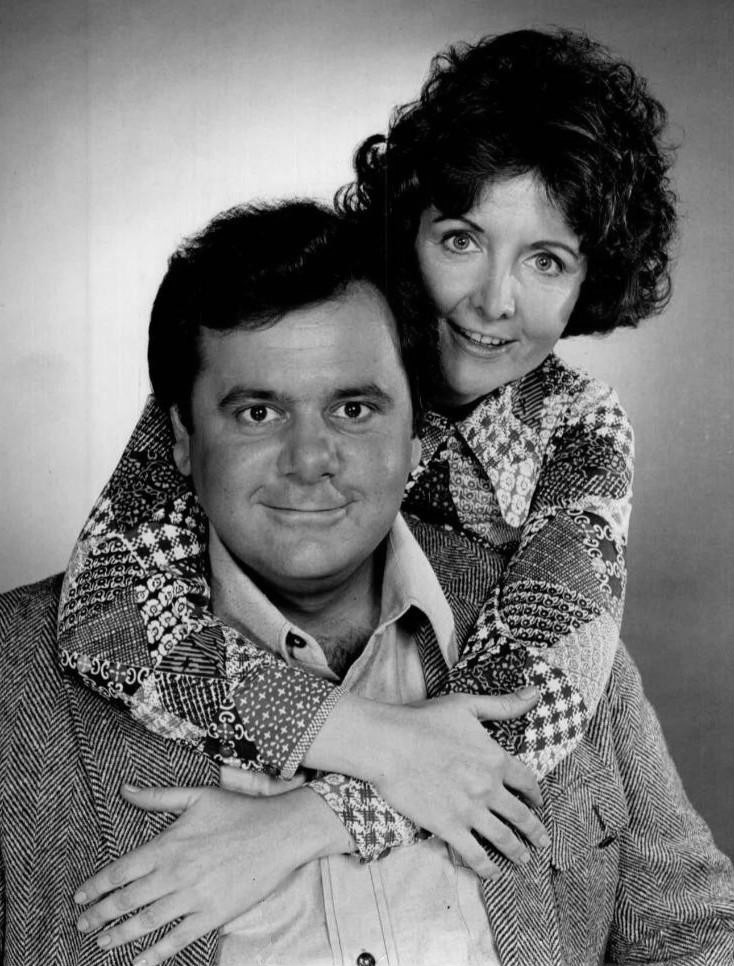
- Mitzi Hoag and We'll Get By co-star Paul Sorvino
- Born: Margaret Myrtle Hoag; September 25, 1932; Cleveland, Ohio, U.S.
- Died: February 26, 2019 (aged 86); Sherman Oaks, California, U.S.
- Occupation: Actress
- Years active: 1955–1993
- Spouse(s): Jonathan David Beggs (1976-2019; her death); Stephen Abel Wolfson (1959-67; divorced; 1 child)

Margaret Myrtle "Mitzi" Hoag (September 25, 1932 – February 26, 2019) was an American actress. Over the course of her career, she appeared in more than 73 different TV shows and movies. Notable among these are recurring roles in We'll Get By, Bonanza, Here Come the Brides, and The Partridge Family.

== Early life and education ==
Hoag was raised in North Olmsted, Ohio, near Cleveland, where she was born. Her father, John C. Hoag, was a supervisor for the A&P store chain. She graduated from John Marshall High School in 1949. A straight-A student and head majorette of the marching band, she appeared in numerous high school stage productions, already using the nickname "Mitzi". After high school, Hoag attended Shimer College, then located in Mount Carroll, Illinois, completing her degree in two years under the radically flexible University of Chicago curriculum of Robert Maynard Hutchins. She chose Shimer for its small classes and the opportunity for horseback riding. Because Shimer was then closely affiliated with the University of Chicago, she is sometimes reported as having graduated from there.

When Hoag graduated from Shimer at age 19 in 1952, she was one of the first five Shimer students to receive the bachelor's degree. She was the only woman in the graduating class. She earned a bachelor of arts in general education, and became a certified teacher, but her experiences with drama at Shimer turned her towards an acting career. After leaving Shimer, Hoag studied drama at the graduate level at Case Western Reserve University for two years.

== Acting career ==
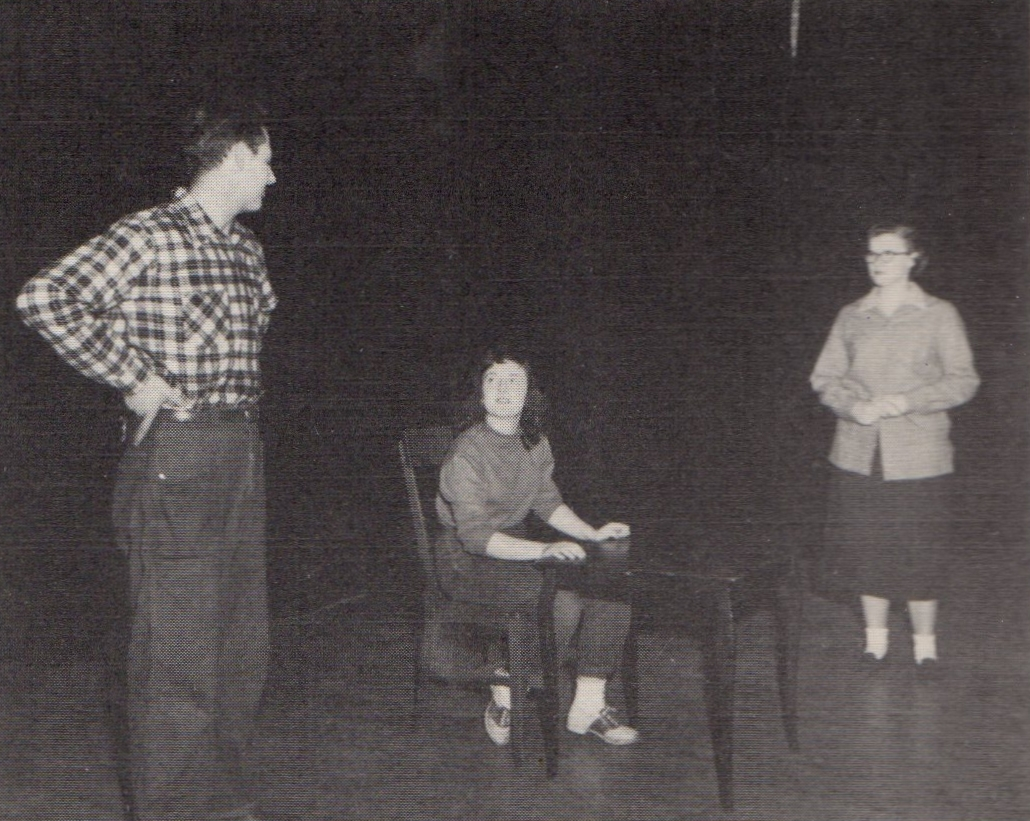
Hoag (center) in a Shimer College production of a J.M. Barrie play in 1952.

In the mid-1950s, Hoag moved to New York, where she continued her study of acting with Herbert Berghof. She was cast in multiple off-Broadway shows, but these were all cancelled due to funding problems. Finally, she starred in the title role of the 1958 off-Broadway hit Heloise, an adaptation by James Forsyth of the story of Heloise and Abelard. The play, which won considerable critical acclaim, was produced primarily by erstwhile actors and staffers of Case Western's Eldred Theatre.

Hoag subsequently went to Hollywood, on her mother's advice. There she married Stephen Wolfson, who had a bit part in Heloise, and later became a teacher. They had a daughter together, but subsequently divorced.

In Hollywood, Hoag at first worked as a stage actress. She parlayed a successful stage performance as Annie Sullivan in The Miracle Worker into screen roles, starting with a role in the movie Tammy and the Doctor, and continuing with numerous TV appearances.

In the late 1960s, Hoag had a recurring role in Here Come the Brides in the late 1960s. In addition, she appeared twice in the TV show Bonanza: in 1966 as Libby Spencefield and in 1972 as Alice Brenner. In 1976, she appeared in the drama Family as Clara Briault. During this period, she also appeared in several movies, including Play It as It Lays, Pieces of Dreams, and Devil's Angels. She also played Natalie Green's adoptive mother on The Facts of Life, a role she played through all 9 seasons.

Hoag's first and only starring role in a TV series came in 1975, when she appeared as the mother Liz Platt in the CBS sitcom We'll Get By, starring opposite Paul Sorvino. A family sitcom, the show was created by Alan Alda, and modeled after his own domestic life. The show ran to twelve episodes, filmed in front of a live studio audience. Originally scheduled for September 1974, the show did not air until March 1975, in a time slot facing Chico and the Man, one of NBC's most popular programs. It was not renewed.

== Filmography ==
Year	Title	Role	Notes
1963	Tammy and the Doctor	Pamela Burke, Nurse	
1967	Devil's Angels	Karen	
1967	The Trip	Wife	
1970	Pieces of Dreams	Anne Lind (Gregory's Sister)	
1970	Cover Me Babe	Mother	
1972	Play It as It Lays	Patsy	Based on the novel by Joan Didion
1973	The Bait	Nancy	ABC Movie of the Week
1973	The Rookies	Camp Counselor - Mrs. Reynolds Miss Hopkins	TV Series Season 1, Episode 16, Season 2, Episode 8
1974	Doctor Dan	Mrs. Wallace	TV film
1974	Hit Lady	Woman at Airport	ABC Movie of the Week
1975	The Rookies	Marge Johnson	Season 4, Episode 2
1977	The Girl in the Empty Grave	Gloria	TV film
1977	Deadly Game	Gloria	TV film
1978	The Suicide	The Mother	Short
1979	Hometown U.S.A.	Mrs. Duckworth	
1980	Why Would I Lie?	Mrs. Hayworth	
1981	The Incredible Shrinking Woman	Vance's Secretary	
1981	All Night Long	Nurse	
1981	Murder in Texas	Edie Kalb	TV film
1981	The Five of Me	Secretary	TV film
1983	Heart Like a Wheel	Shirley's Mother	
1984	Second Sight: A Love Story	Leslie McKay	TV film
1988	Addicted to His Love	Estelle	TV film

== Works cited ==
- Chance, Norman (2011). Who Was Who On Television. ISBN 978-1456821296.
