= Echoes of a Summer =

1976 film by Don Taylor

- Theatrical release poster
- Directed by: Don Taylor
- Written by: Robert L. Joseph
- Starring: Jodie Foster; Richard Harris; Lois Nettleton; Brad Savage; Geraldine Fitzgerald
- Cinematography: John Coquillon
- Music by: Terry James
- Production company: Astral Films
- Distributed by: United Artists (theatrical release); MGM (current owner)
- Release date: April 1976
- Running time: 99 minutes
- Countries: United States; Canada
- Language: English
- Budget: CAD 900,000

Echoes of a Summer is a 1976 Canadian-American family drama film directed by Don Taylor, based on the play Isle of Children by Robert L. Joseph, who also adapted the screenplay. It stars Jodie Foster, Richard Harris, Lois Nettleton, Brad Savage, and Geraldine Fitzgerald. The film follows; Deirdre Striden (Foster), a perceptive 11-year-old girl with an incurable heart ailment. Her mother, Ruth (Nettleton), wants to continue to take her to new doctors, although she knows that treatment is futile. Her father, Eugene (Harris), thinks she should be at their lake house, living in denial of her condition. It is only through her friendship with her 9-year-old neighbor, Philip (Savage), that Deirdre is able to honestly face the reality of death.

Echoes of a Summer was released in limited theatres in Canada in April 1976. Although mostly dismissed by the critics and audiences at the time of its release, the film was notable for an acclaimed performance by Foster, who also had her breakthrough that year with four prominent releases, including Taxi Driver.

== Plot ==
Eleven-year-old Deirdre Striden (Jodie Foster) has an incurable heart condition, despite consultations with heart specialists at the behest of her parents Eugene (Richard Harris) and Ruth (Lois Nettleton). The Striden family has since moved to Mahone Bay, Nova Scotia to ensure that her last days are as pleasant as possible. The nine-year-old neighbour boy Phillip (Brad Savage) is the only one who brings a little happiness into the home, since Deirdre knows exactly what is wrong with her. After she has an acute attack and the end approaches faster than expected, Deirdre and Phillip succeed anyway in celebrating the twelfth birthday of the girl as a day of joy.

== Cast ==
- Jodie Foster - Deirdre Striden
- Richard Harris - Eugene Striden
- Lois Nettleton - Ruth Striden
- Geraldine Fitzgerald - Sara
- William Windom - Dr. Hallet
- Brad Savage - Philip
