= Don Knotts =

American actor and comedian (1924–2006)

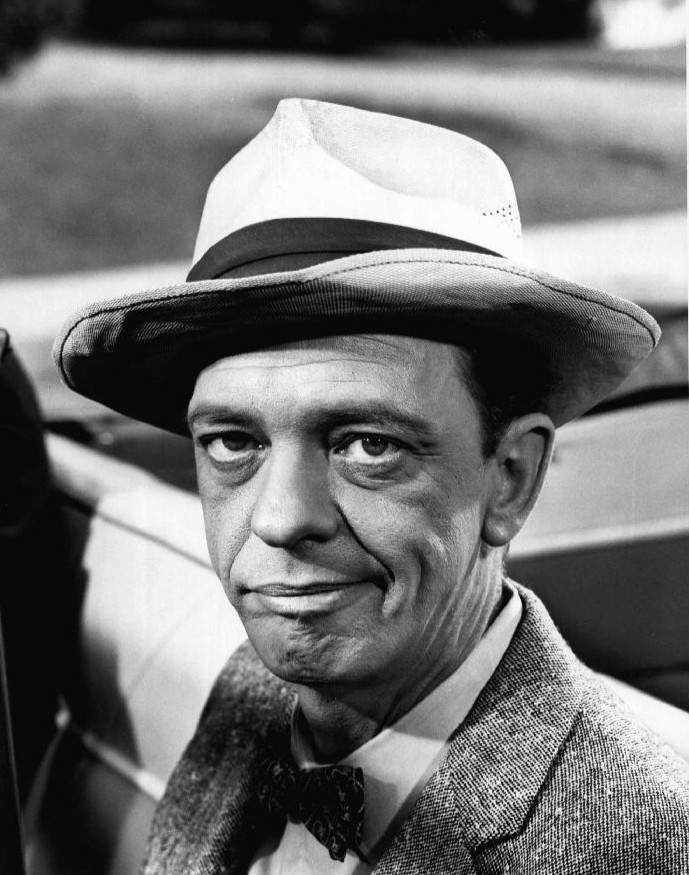
- Knotts in 1966
- Born: Jesse Donald Knotts; July 21, 1924; Morgantown, West Virginia, U.S.
- Died: February 24, 2006 (aged 81); Los Angeles, California, U.S.
- Resting place: Westwood Village Memorial Park Cemetery, Los Angeles, California, U.S.
- Education: West Virginia University (BA)
- Occupations: Actor; comedian
- Years active: 1941–2006
- Spouses: Kathryn Metz (m. 1947; div. 1964); Loralee Czuchna (m. 1974; div. 1983); Frances Yarborough (m. 2002)
- Children: 2, including Karen Knotts
- Relatives: Ron Howard (cousin)

Jesse Donald Knotts (July 21, 1924 – February 24, 2006) was an American actor and comedian. He is widely known for his role as Deputy Sheriff Barney Fife on the 1960s sitcom The Andy Griffith Show, for which he earned five Emmy Awards. He also played Ralph Furley on the sitcom Three's Company from 1979 to 1984. He starred in multiple comedic films, including leading roles in The Incredible Mr. Limpet (1964) and The Ghost and Mr. Chicken (1966). In 2004, TV Guide ranked him number 27 on its "50 Greatest TV Stars of All Time" list.

Knotts was born in West Virginia, the youngest of four children. In the 1940s, before earning a college degree, he served in the United States Army and in World War II. While enlisted, he chose to become a ventriloquist and comedian as part of a G.I. variety show, Stars and Gripes.

After the army, he got his first major break on television on the soap opera Search for Tomorrow, where he appeared from 1953 to 1955. He gained wide recognition as part of the repertory company on Steve Allen's variety show, where he played the "extremely nervous man" in Allen's mock "Man in the Street" interviews. In 1958, Knotts made his film debut in the adapted version of No Time for Sergeants.

Knotts was cast as deputy Barney Fife on television's The Andy Griffith Show, which ran from 1960 to 1968. He reprised the character on other shows, such as The Joey Bishop Show and Return to Mayberry. Knotts won five Emmy Awards for Best Supporting Actor in a Television Comedy.

== Early life ==
Knotts was born in Morgantown, West Virginia, the youngest of four sons of farmer William Jesse Knotts and his wife Elsie Luzetta Knotts (née Moore), who were married in Spraggs, Pennsylvania. His English paternal ancestors emigrated to America in the 17th century, originally settling in Queen Anne's County, Maryland. His brothers were named Willis, William and Ralph (who was called "Sid").

Knotts's mother was 40 years old at his birth. His father, who had schizophrenia and battled alcoholism, sometimes terrorized him with a knife, causing him to turn inwards at an early age. His father died of pneumonia when Knotts was 13. He and his brothers were subsequently raised by their mother, who ran a boarding house in Morgantown. She died in 1969 at age 84. Her son William preceded her in death in 1941 at age 31. They are buried in the family plot at Beverly Hills Memorial Park in Morgantown.

Knotts graduated from Morgantown High School. After enlisting in the United States Army and serving in World War II, he earned a bachelor's degree in education with a minor in speech from West Virginia University in Morgantown, graduating in 1948. He was a member of Phi Sigma Kappa fraternity at WVU.

== Career ==
=== Early career ===
Before he entered high school, Knotts began performing as a ventriloquist and comedian at various church and school functions. After high school, he traveled to New York City to try to make his way as a comedian, but when his career failed to take off, he returned home to attend West Virginia University. After his freshman year, he joined the U.S. Army and spent most of his service entertaining troops. He toured the western Pacific Islands as a comedian, in a G.I. variety show called Stars and Gripes. His ventriloquist act included a dummy named Danny that Knotts grew to hate and eventually threw overboard, according to friend and castmate Al Checco.

Knotts served in the army from June 21, 1943, to January 6, 1946, in the Army's 6817th Special Services Battalion. He was discharged at the rank of Technician Grade 5, equivalent at the time to corporal. During his service, he was awarded the World War II Victory Medal, the Philippine Liberation Medal, the Asiatic–Pacific Campaign Medal (with four bronze service stars), the American Campaign Medal, the Army Good Conduct Medal, the Army Marksman Badge (with an M1 Carbine) and the Honorable Service Lapel Pin.

After being demobilized, Knotts returned to West Virginia University and graduated in 1948. He married Kay Metz and moved back to New York, where connections that he had made in the Special Services Branch helped him to break into show business. In addition to doing stand-up comedy at clubs, he appeared on radio, eventually playing the wisecracking, know-it-all character "Windy Wales" on a radio Western called Bobby Benson and the B-Bar-B Riders.

Knotts got his first break on television on the soap opera Search for Tomorrow, where he appeared from 1953 to 1955. He had a recurring role on the Howdy Doody show beginning in 1954 as "Tim Tremble". He came to fame in 1956 on Steve Allen's variety show as part of Allen's repertory company, most notably in Allen's mock "Man in the Street" interviews, always playing an extremely nervous man. He remained with Allen through the 1959–1960 season.

From October 20, 1955, through September 14, 1957, he appeared with Andy Griffith in the Broadway stage version of No Time for Sergeants, in which he played two roles, listed in the Playbill as a Corporal Manual Dexterity and a Preacher. In 1958, he made his movie debut with Griffith in the film version of No Time for Sergeants, in which he reprised his Broadway role, playing a high-strung Air Force test administrator whose routine is disrupted by the hijinks of a provincial new recruit.

=== The Andy Griffith Show ===
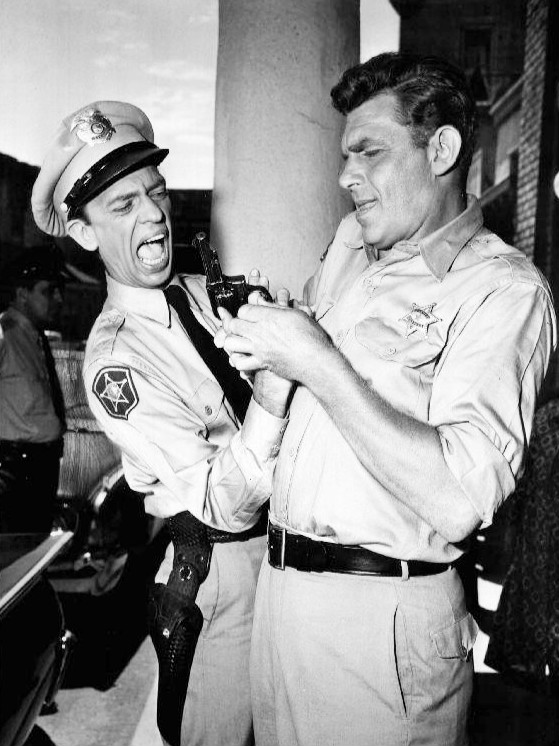
As Barney Fife, Knotts gets the help of Sheriff Taylor when his gun gets stuck on his finger.

Knotts receives his first Emmy Award for The Andy Griffith Show, 1961.

In 1960, Andy Griffith was offered the opportunity to headline his own sitcom, The Andy Griffith Show (1960–1968). Knotts took the role of Barney Fife, the deputy—and originally cousin—of Sheriff Andy Taylor (portrayed by Griffith). Knotts's portrayal of the deputy on the popular show earned for him five Emmy Awards for Best Supporting Actor in a Television Comedy.

A summary of the show from the website of the Museum of Broadcast Communications describes Deputy Barney Fife:

Self-important, romantic, and nearly always wrong, Barney dreamed of the day he could use the one bullet Andy had issued to him, though he did fire his gun on a few occasions. He always fired his pistol accidentally while still in his holster or in the ceiling of the courthouse, at which point he would sadly hand his pistol to Andy. This is why Barney kept one very shiny bullet in his shirt pocket. In episode #196, Andy gave Barney more bullets so that he would have a loaded gun to go after a bad guy that Barney unintentionally helped escape. While Barney was forever frustrated that Mayberry was too small for the delusional ideas he had of himself, viewers got the sense that he couldn't have survived anywhere else. Don Knotts played the comic and pathetic sides of the character with equal aplomb and he received three Emmy Awards during the show's first five seasons.

When the show first aired, Griffith was intended to be the comedic lead with Knotts as his straight man, similar to their roles in No Time for Sergeants. However, it was quickly discovered that the show was funnier with the roles reversed. As Griffith maintained in several interviews, "By the second episode, I knew that Don should be funny, and I should play straight."

Knotts believed remarks by Griffith that The Andy Griffith Show would end after five seasons, and he began to look for other work, signing a five-film contract with Universal Studios. In his autobiography, Knotts admitted that he had not yet signed the contract when Griffith announced his decision to continue the series; but he had made up his mind to move on, believing that he would not get the chance again. Knotts left the series in 1965. His character's absence on the show was explained by Deputy Fife having finally made the "big time", joining the Raleigh, North Carolina, police force.

=== Post-Mayberry film career ===
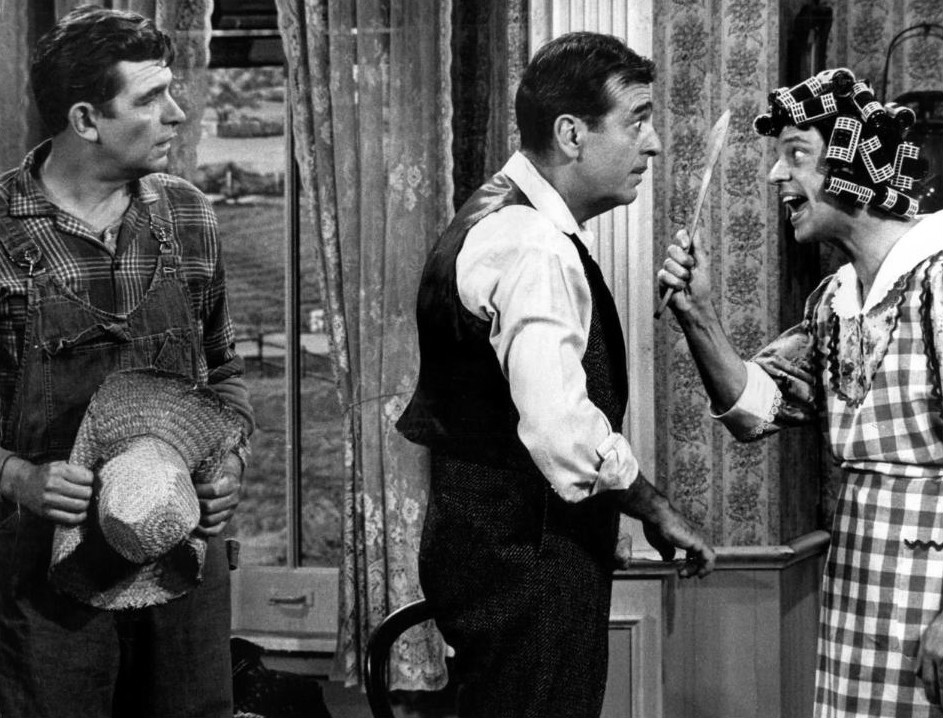
On a 1967 Andy Griffith special, Knotts plays the outraged wife of Tennessee Ernie Ford, as Griffith looks on.

Knotts went on to star in a series of film comedies that drew on his high-strung persona from the television series. He had a cameo appearance in United Artists' It's a Mad, Mad, Mad, Mad World (1963), and starred in Warner Bros.' The Incredible Mr. Limpet (1964). Knotts began his Universal five-film contract with The Ghost and Mr. Chicken (1966), followed by The Reluctant Astronaut (1967), The Shakiest Gun in the West (1968), The Love God? (1969) and How to Frame a Figg (1971).

Knotts reprised his role as Barney Fife several times in the 1960s. He made five guest appearances on The Andy Griffith Show (earning another two Emmy Awards), and he appeared once on the spin-off Mayberry R.F.D., in which he was present as best man for the marriage of Andy Taylor and his longtime love, Helen Crump. He continued to work steadily, although he did not appear as a regular on any successful television series until 1979, when he took the part of landlord Ralph Furley on Three's Company.

In the late 1960s and early 1970s, Knotts served as the spokesman for Dodge trucks and was featured prominently in a series of print ads and dealer brochures. On television, he hosted a variety show/sitcom hybrid on NBC, The Don Knotts Show, which aired on Tuesdays during autumn 1970, but the series was low-rated and short-lived, and Knotts was uncomfortable with the variety show format. He also made frequent guest appearances on other shows, such as The Bill Cosby Show and Here's Lucy. In 1970, he appeared as a Barney Fife-like police officer in the pilot of The New Andy Griffith Show. In 1972, Knotts voiced an animated version of himself in two episodes of The New Scooby Doo Movies: "The Spooky Fog of Juneberry", in which he played a lawman resembling Barney Fife, and "Guess Who's Knott Coming to Dinner". He appeared as Felix Unger in a stage version of Neil Simon's The Odd Couple, with Art Carney as Oscar Madison, and toured in the Neil Simon comedy Last of the Red Hot Lovers.

Beginning in 1975, Knotts was teamed with Tim Conway in a series of slapstick films aimed at children, including the Disney film The Apple Dumpling Gang (1975) and its sequel, The Apple Dumpling Gang Rides Again (1979). They also did two independent films, the boxing comedy The Prize Fighter (1979) and the mystery-comedy The Private Eyes (1980). Knotts co-starred in several other Disney films, including Gus (1976), No Deposit, No Return (1976), Herbie Goes to Monte Carlo (1977), and Hot Lead and Cold Feet (1978).

=== Three's Company ===
In 1979, Knotts returned to series television as the wacky but lovable landlord Ralph Furley on Three's Company. The series, which was already an established hit, added Knotts to the cast when the original landlords, Stanley and Helen Roper (a married couple played by Norman Fell and Audra Lindley, respectively), left to star in their own short-lived spin-off series The Ropers.

On the set, Knotts easily integrated himself into the already established cast, who were, as John Ritter put it, "so scared" of Knotts because of his star status. When Suzanne Somers left the show after a contract dispute in 1981, the writers started giving the material meant for Somers's Chrissy to Knotts's Furley. Knotts remained on the series until it ended in 1984. Carol Summers, the Three's Company script supervisor, became Knotts's agent and often accompanied him to personal appearances.

=== Later years ===
In 1986, Knotts reunited with Andy Griffith in the made-for-television film Return to Mayberry, reprising his Barney Fife role. In early 1987, he joined the cast of the first-run syndicated comedy What a Country!, as Principal Bud McPherson, for its remaining 13 episodes. It was produced by Martin Rips and Joseph Staretski, who had previously worked on Three's Company. From 1988 until 1992, Knotts joined Andy Griffith on Matlock in the recurring role of pesky neighbor Les Calhoun.

His roles became more sporadic, including a cameo appearance in the film Big Bully (1996) as the high school principal. In 1998, he had a small but pivotal role as a mysterious TV repairman in Pleasantville. That year, his hometown of Morgantown, West Virginia, changed the name of the street formerly known as South University Avenue (U.S. Route 119) to Don Knotts Boulevard on "Don Knotts Day". Also on that day, in honor of Knotts's role as Barney Fife, he was named an honorary deputy sheriff with the Monongalia County Sheriff's Department.

Knotts was recognized in 2000 with a star on the Hollywood Walk of Fame. He continued to act on stage, but much of his film and television work after 2000 was as voice talent. In 2002, he appeared again with Scooby-Doo in the video game Scooby-Doo! Night of 100 Frights. He also spoofed his appearances on that show in various promotions for Cartoon Network, and in a parody on Robot Chicken, on which he was teamed with Phyllis Diller. In 2003, he teamed up again with Tim Conway to provide voices for the direct-to-video children's series Hermie and Friends, which continued until his death. In 2005, he was the voice of Mayor Turkey Lurkey in Chicken Little (2005), his first Disney movie since 1979.

On September 12, 2003, he was in Kansas City, in a stage version of On Golden Pond, when he received a call from John Ritter's family telling him that his former Three's Company co-star had died that day of an aortic dissection. He and his co-stars attended the funeral four days later. Knotts had appeared with Ritter for the last time in 2003 in a cameo on 8 Simple Rules... for Dating My Teenage Daughter, in an episode that paid homage to their previous television series. Knotts was the last Three's Company star to work with Ritter.

During this period of time, macular degeneration in both eyes caused the otherwise robust Knotts to become virtually blind. His live appearances on television were few. In 2005, he parodied his Ralph Furley character while playing a Paul Young variation in a Desperate Housewives sketch on The 3rd Annual TV Land Awards. He parodied that part one final time in "Stone Cold Crazy", an episode of the sitcom That '70s Show, in which he played the landlord. It was his last live-action television appearance. His final role was in Air Buddies (2006), a direct-to-video sequel to Air Bud, voicing the sheriff's deputy dog Sniffer.

== Personal life ==
Knotts's friend Al Checco said, "Don was somewhat of a ladies' man. He fancied himself something of a Frank Sinatra. The ladies loved him and he dated quite a bit." Knotts was married three times. His marriage to Kathryn Metz lasted from 1947 until their divorce in 1964. They had a son, Thomas Knotts, and a daughter, actress Karen Knotts (born April 2, 1954). After they divorced, Knotts raised his daughter as a single parent. He married Loralee Czuchna in 1974; they divorced in 1983. His third marriage was to Frances Yarborough, from 2002 until his death in 2006.

Knotts struggled with hypochondria and macular degeneration. Betty Lynn, one of his co-stars on The Andy Griffith Show, described him as a "very quiet man. Very sweet. Nothing like Barney Fife." TV writer Mark Evanier called him "the most beloved person in all of show business".

In February 2025, Knotts's co-star Ron Howard revealed that he had recently learned that the two were distant cousins but neither had known during Knotts's lifetime.

== Death ==
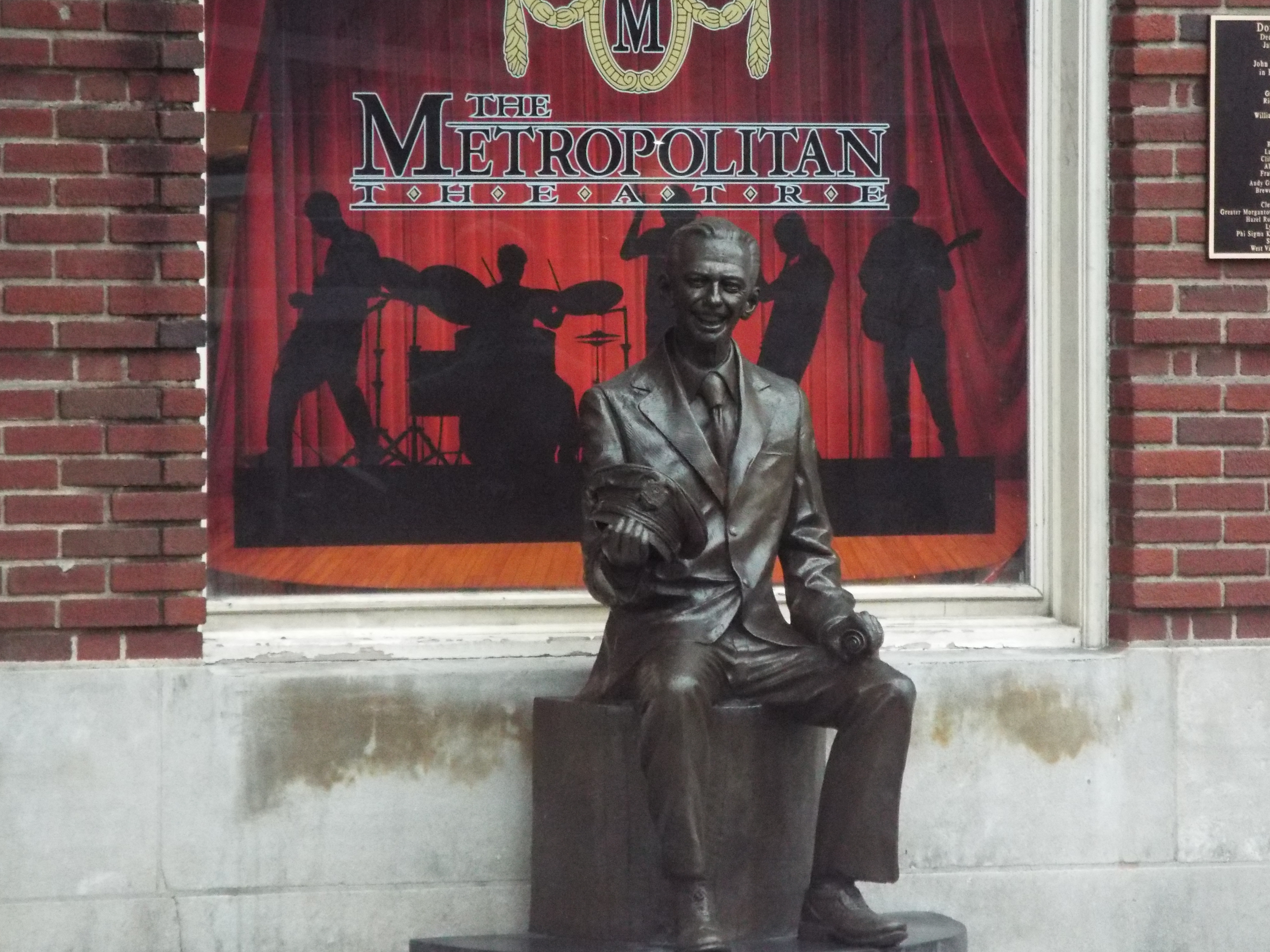
Statue of Don Knotts, Metropolitan Theatre

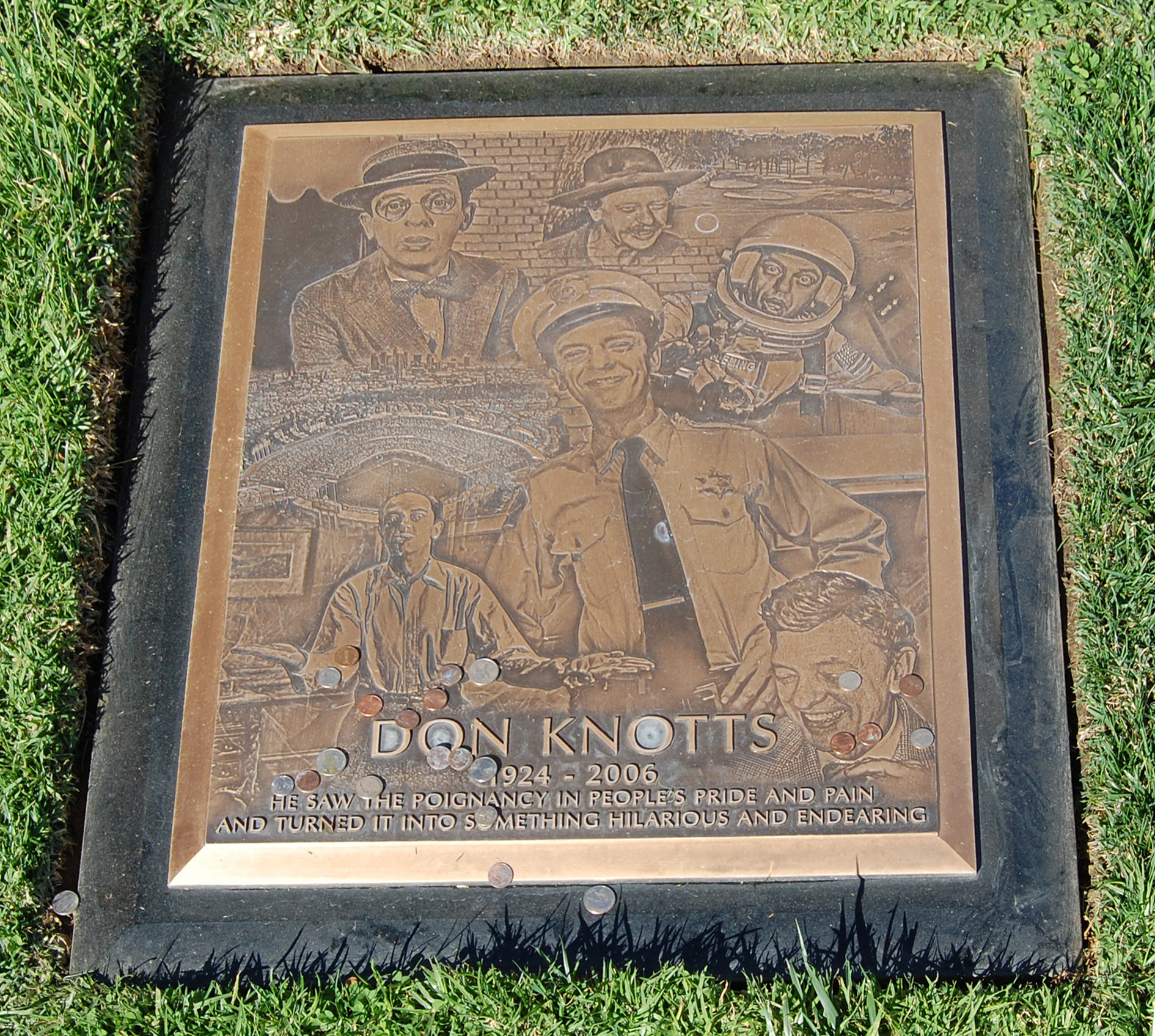
Knotts's grave

Knotts died at age 81 on February 24, 2006, at the Cedars-Sinai Medical Center in Los Angeles from pulmonary and respiratory complications of pneumonia related to lung cancer. He underwent treatment at Cedars-Sinai Medical Center in the months before his death but returned home after reportedly feeling better. He was buried at Westwood Memorial Park in Los Angeles.

Knotts's obituaries cited him as a major influence on other entertainers. In early 2011, his grave's plain granite headstone was replaced with a bronze plaque depicting several of his movie and television roles. A statue honoring him, created by Jamie Lester, was unveiled on July 23, 2016, in front of The Metropolitan Theatre on High Street in his hometown of Morgantown, West Virginia.

== Filmography ==
The following are Don Knotts's acting credits.

=== Film ===
Year	Title	Role	Notes
1958	No Time for Sergeants	Corporal John C. Brown	
1960	Wake Me When It's Over	Sergeant Percy Warren	
1961	The Last Time I Saw Archie	Captain Harry Little	
1963	It's a Mad, Mad, Mad, Mad World	Nervous Motorist	
1963	Move Over, Darling	Shoe Clerk	
1964	The Incredible Mr. Limpet	Henry Limpet	
1966	The Ghost and Mr. Chicken	Luther Heggs	
1967	The Reluctant Astronaut	Roy Fleming	
1968	The Shakiest Gun in the West	Jesse W. Heywood	
1969	The Love God?	Abner Audubon Peacock IV	
1971	How to Frame a Figg	Hollis Alexander Figg	also Writer
1975	The Apple Dumpling Gang	Theodore Ogelvie	
1976	No Deposit, No Return	Bert Delaney	
1976	Gus	Coach Venner	
1977	Herbie Goes to Monte Carlo	Wheely Applegate	
1978	Hot Lead and Cold Feet	Sheriff Denver Kid	
1978	Mule Feathers	Narrator, The Mule (voices)	
1979	The Apple Dumpling Gang Rides Again	Theodore Ogelvie	
1979	The Prize Fighter	Shake	
1980	The Private Eyes	Inspector Winship	
1984	Cannonball Run II	CHP Officer #2	
1987	Pinocchio and the Emperor of the Night	Gee Willikers (voice)	
1991	Timmy's Gift: A Precious Moments Christmas	Titus (voice)	Short Film
1996	Big Bully	Principal Kokelar	
1997	Cats Don't Dance	T.W. Turtle (voice)	
1998	Pleasantville	TV Repairman	
2000	Tom Sawyer	Mutt Potter (Voice Role)	Direct-to-Video
2004	Hermie & Friends: Flo the Lyin' Fly	Wormie (voice)	Short Film
2004	Hermie & Friends: Webster the Scaredy Spider	Wormie (voice)	Short Film
2005	Hermie & Friends: Buzby, the Misbehaving Bee	Wormie (voice)	Short Film
2005	Hermie & Friends: A Fruitcake Christmas	Wormie (voice)	Direct-to-Video
2005	Chicken Little	Mayor Turkey Lurkey (voice)	
2006	Hermie & Friends: Stanely the Stinkbug Goes to Camp	Wormie (voice)	Direct-to-Video
2006	Hermie & Friends: To Share or Nut to Share	Wormie (voice)	Direct-to-Video
2006	Air Buddies	Sniffer (voice)	Direct-to-Video, Posthumous release

=== Television ===
Year	Title	Role	Notes
1953–1955	Search for Tomorrow	Wilbur Peterson	Series regular
1957–1960	The Steve Allen Plymouth Show	Himself (Guest)	Series regular (108 episodes)
1958	The Bob Cummings Show	Flash Grushkin	Episode: "Bob and Schultzy at Sea"
1958	I've Got a Secret	Himself (Guest)	Episode: "09.03.1958"
1960	The Many Loves of Dobie Gillis	Esmond Metzger	Episode: "Rock-A-Bye Dobie"
1960–1968	The Andy Griffith Show	Barney Fife	Series regular (162 episodes)
1961–1965	The Red Skelton Show	Commodore of Lagoons / Horaces Horatio / Mr Pallid / Herbie	4 episodes
1962–1964	The Garry Moore Show	Himself (Guest)	4 episodes
1963	The Jerry Lewis Show	Himself (Guest)	Episode: "#1.7"
1963–1967	The Andy Williams Show	Himself (Guest)	2 episodes
1964	The Joey Bishop Show	Barney Fife	Episode: "Joey's Hideaway Cabin"
1964	The Red Skelton Show	Himself / "Steady Fingers" Ferguson	Episode: "How Are Things in Glocca Moron?"
1964–1970	The Hollywood Palace	Himself (Host)	4 episodes
1964–1974	The Tonight Show Starring Johnny Carson	Himself (Guest)	5 episodes
1966	McHale's Navy	Lieutenant Pratt	Episode: "Little Red Riding Doctor"
1966	American Bandstand	Himself	Episode: "#9.30"
1967	Bob Hope Presents the Chrysler Theatre	Curly Kid	Episode: "The Reason Nobody Hardly Ever Seen a Fat Outlaw in the Old West Is as Follows"
1967	The Don Knotts Special	Himself (Host / Presenter)	TV special
1968	Mayberry R.F.D.	Barney Fife	Episode: "Andy and Helen Get Married"
1968	The Smothers Brothers Comedy Hour	Himself (Guest)	Episode: "#2.22"
1969	The Andy Williams Show	Himself (Guest)	Episode: "#1.5"
1970	The Bill Cosby Show	Leo Swann	Episode: "Swann's Way"
1970	The Ray Stevens Show	Himself	Episode: "#1.2"
1970–1971	The Don Knotts Show	Himself (Host)	Series regular (22 episodes)
1970–1975	The Bob Hope Show	Himself (Guest)	2 episodes
1971	The New Andy Griffith Show	Barney Fife	Episode: "My Friend, the Mayor"
1972	The New Scooby-Doo Movies	Don Knotts / Homer Pipsqueak (voice)	2 episodes
1972	The Man Who Came to Dinner	Dr. Bradley	TV movie
1972	The Dick Cavett Show	Himself (Guest)	Episode: "05.26.1972"
1972–1973	The New Bill Cosby Show	Himself	2 episodes
1972–1974	The Merv Griffin Show	Himself (Guest)	2 episodes
1973	Here's Lucy	Ben Fletcher	Episode: "Lucy Goes on Her Last Blind Date"
1973	I Love a Mystery	Alexander Archer	TV movie
1974	Wait Till Your Father Gets Home	Charlie "Bumbles" Johnson (voice)	Episode: "Don Knotts, the Beekeeper"
1974	The Girl with Something Extra	Lionel	Episode: "The Not-So-Good Samaritan"
1974–1977	Hollywood Squares	Himself (Panelist)	4 episodes
1975	Harry and Maggie	Harry Kellog	TV movie
1975	Laugh Back	Various Characters	Series regular
1975–1976	Dinah!	Himself (Guest)	5 episodes
1976	Dean Martin Celebrity Roast: Danny Thomas	Himself	TV special
1976–1977	The Sonny & Cher Comedy Hour	Himself / Various Characters	5 episodes
1976–1977	Donny & Marie	Himself (Guest)	2 episodes
1977	The Muppet Show	Himself (Special Guest Star)	Episode: "Don Knotts"
1978–1979	Fantasy Island	Felix Birdsong / Stanley Scheckter	2 episodes
1979	The Muppets Go Hollywood	Himself	TV special
1979–1984	Three's Company	Ralph Furley	Series regular (87 episodes)
1979–1987	The Love Boat	Himself / Herb Groebecker	2 episodes
1980	The Tim Conway Show	Himself (Guest)	2 episodes
1985	Inspector Gadget	Male M.A.D. Agent (voice)	Episode: "Ghost Catchers"
1985	George Burns Comedy Week	Himself	Episode: "Disaster at Buzz Creek"
1986	Return to Mayberry	Barney Fife	TV movie
1987	What a Country!	F. Jerry "Bud" McPherson	Recurring role (11 episodes)
1987	The Little Troll Prince	Professor Nidaros (voice)	TV movie
1988	She's the Sheriff	Moe	Episode: "Hair"
1988–1992	Matlock	Les Calhoun	Recurring role (17 episodes)
1990	Newhart	Iron	Episode: "Seein' Double"
1992	Fish Police	Mr. Lichen (voice)	Episode: "The Two Girls"
1993	Garfield and Friends	Additional voices	2 episodes
1993	Step by Step	Deputy Feif	Episode: "Christmas Story"
1993	Andy Griffith Show Reunion	Himself	TV special
1993	Late Show with David Letterman	Himself (Guest)	Episode: "09.23.1993"
1994	Burke's Law	Dr. Adkins	Episode: "Who Killed Good Time Charlie?"
1998	E! True Hollywood Story	Himself (Interviewee)	Episode: "Three's Company"
1999	Jingle Bells	Kris (Voice Role)	TV movie
1999	Late Night with Conan O'Brien	Himself (Guest)	Episode: "Lennox Lewis / Dave Chappelle / Don Knotts"
1999–2002	Biography	Himself (Interviewee)	3 episodes — "Ron Howard: Hollywood's Favorite Son" (1999) — "Don Knotts: Nervous Laughter" (2000) — "John Ritter: In Good Company" (2002)
2000	Quints	Governor Healy	TV movie
2002	The Griffin and the Minor Canon	Messenger #1	TV movie
2003	Hermie: A Common Caterpillar	Wormie (Voice Role)	TV movie
2003	8 Simple Rules	Himself	Episode: "Come and Knock on Our Door"
2003	Odd Job Jack	Dirk Douglas	Episode: "American Wiener"
2003	The Andy Griffith Show Reunion: Back to Mayberry	Himself / Barney Fife	TV documentary
2003	Larry King Live	Himself (Guest)	Episode: "11.27.2003"
2004	Johnny Bravo	Himself (voice)	2 episodes
2004	Hermie & Friends	Wormie (voice)	TV movie
2005	That '70s Show	The Landlord	Episode: "Stone Cold Crazy"
2005	Fatherhood	Edwin Mazur / Mr. Mauzer	2 episodes
2005	Las Vegas	Himself	Episode: "Hit Me!"
2005	Robot Chicken	Himself (voice)	Episode: "Operation Rich in Spirit"

=== Video games ===
Year	Title	Role	Notes
2002	Scooby-Doo: Night of 100 Frights	Groundskeeper	Voice Role

== Bibliography ==
• ISBN 9781572972100 Barney Fife and Other Characters I Have Known

== Awards ==
The following are accolades and honors that Don Knotts received throughout his career.

Association	Nominated work	Year	Category	Result	Ref
Emmy Awards (Primetime)	The Andy Griffith Show	1961	Outstanding Supporting Actor in a Comedy Series	Won	
Emmy Awards (Primetime)	The Andy Griffith Show	1962	Outstanding Supporting Actor in a Comedy Series	Won	
Emmy Awards (Primetime)	The Andy Griffith Show	1963	Outstanding Supporting Actor in a Comedy Series	Won	
Emmy Awards (Primetime)	The Andy Griffith Show	1966	Outstanding Supporting Actor in a Comedy Series	Won	
Emmy Awards (Primetime)	The Andy Griffith Show	1967	Outstanding Supporting Actor in a Comedy Series	Won	
Online Film & Television Association	—N/a	2007	TV Hall of Fame — Actors and Actresses	Won	
Walk of Fame	—N/a	2000	Television — 7083 Hollywood, Blvd. (January 19, 2000)	Won	
