= No Deposit, No Return =

1976 film by Norman Tokar

- Theatrical release poster
- Directed by: Norman Tokar
- Screenplay by: Arthur Alsberg; Don Nelson
- Story by: Joseph L. McEveety
- Produced by: Ron Miller
- Starring: David Niven; Darren McGavin; Don Knotts; Herschel Bernardi; Charles Martin Smith; Barbara Feldon; Kim Richards; Brad Savage
- Cinematography: Frank V. Phillips
- Edited by: Cotton Warburton
- Music by: Buddy Baker
- Production company: Walt Disney Productions
- Distributed by: Buena Vista Distribution
- Release date: February 11, 1976 (Los Angeles)
- Running time: 112 minutes
- Country: United States
- Language: English

No Deposit, No Return is a 1976 American crime comedy film directed by Norman Tokar and produced by Walt Disney Productions. The film was written by Arthur Alsberg and Don Nelson, and stars David Niven, Darren McGavin, Don Knotts, Herschel Bernardi, Charles Martin Smith, Barbara Feldon, Kim Richards, and Brad Savage. Inspired by the O. Henry short stories "The Ransom of Red Chief" and "A Retrieved Reformation", the film follows two children, Tracy and Jay, who hold themselves for ransom, reluctantly aided by a couple of inept petty criminals, expert safecracker Duke and his bungling sidekick Bert. It was released in theaters on February 11, 1976, accompanied with a reissue of the animated film Dumbo (1941).

== Plot ==
Siblings Tracy and Jay begin their Easter holidays with disappointment as they hear their mother, Carolyn, whom they had expected to pick them up from school, is instead in Hong Kong. Before she left, she made plans that the two children spend the vacation with their grandfather, Los Angeles billionaire J.W. Osborne. Neither the children nor Osborne are enthused. Osborne, who has had bad experiences with the children, takes steps to ensure the same level of chaos is not repeated.

During the plane trip, Jay realizes he has mislaid his pet skunk, Duster. In the horror and panic ensuing from the loss, Osborne's loyal butler, Mr. Jamieson, fails to meet them at the airport, and the children make their escape in a taxi. Meanwhile, at the same airport, safe-crackers and robbers Duke and Bert sneak their way into the airport offices to crack the airport safe. However, after opening it, Bert accidentally locks it. Out of time, they escape out of the airport, only to discover their escape vehicle has been towed. They scramble for a taxi, shared with Tracy and Jay.

At Duke and Bert's apartment, Duke attempts to shake them off but, through Tracy's excellent play acting, his better nature prevails and he invites the children to spend the night. Unawares to the children, Osborne caught sight of them as they left the taxi and followed them all the way to Duke and Bert's. Because the children appear to be in no immediate danger, Osborne leaves them where they are.

The next day, Tracy devises a plan to follow Carolyn to Hong Kong in which they pay for their plane travel by mailing Osborne a fake ransom note, demanding $100,000 by 4:00 pm that same day. Meanwhile, Duke and Bert receive a visit from Big Joe, a local gangster to whom they owe money. The amount owed has shot up considerably since the three last spoke, and Joe reminds Duke he has 72 hours to pay it back. Desperate, they go along with Tracy's plan but fail to get any money, as Osborne knows about the scam.

Tracy does not give up and makes a bogus call to the police insinuating a kidnapping. This puts Sergeant Turner on the case, an officer hell-bent on catching Duke, who is known for the safe-cracking method and for having not stolen anything. It also brings Carolyn back to America, demanding an explanation as to how the children have gone missing. Time is running out for Duke and Bert. After several negotiations, the ransom is considerably lower, and a meeting is arranged by the docks, exchanging money for the children. However, the police only have ideas of catching the kidnappers and are completely unaware Osborne knows the children's location. Duke clocks on to their plan before they are caught, and a frantic car chase through the docks ensues. Carolyn leaps into the back of Duke and Bert's car as they speed off and is then made aware that her children are in no immediate danger. The chase ends in Sgt Turner's deputy, Detective Longnecker, writing off the police cruiser and driving it into the water.

Tracy and Jay make it back to Osborne's, having averted Big Joe. They go into his safe and hide when they hear him coming but find themselves in big trouble when Jamieson shuts the safe and locks it. Duke, Bert, and Carolyn trace the children back to the house and find Jamieson, who claims the children are not in the house. Carolyn is not convinced, and a sighting of Duster proves her theory. None of them know the combination to the safe however and have only a short amount of time before the air in the safe runs out. It's then up to Duke to use his safe-cracking skills to open the safe. Sgt. Turner then arrives at the house and, upon witnessing Duke crack a safe to save the children, declines to arrest him. Osborne then pays off Duke and Bert's debts and reconciles with his grandchildren. Duke also manages to set up his own garage; the film ends hinting romance between Duke and Carolyn.

== Cast ==
- David Niven as J.W. Osborne
- Darren McGavin as Duke
- Don Knotts as Bert Delaney
- Herschel Bernardi as Sgt. Max Turner
- Charles Martin Smith as Longnecker
- Barbara Feldon as Carolyn Osborne
- Kim Richards as Tracy Osborne
- Brad Savage as Jay Osborne
- John Williams as Jameson
- Vic Tayback as Big Joe
- Robert Hastings as Peter
- Louis Guss as Freddie
- Richard O'Brien as Capt. Boland
- Barney Phillips as Sgt. Benson
- Ruth Manning as Miss Murdock
- Olive Dunbar as Mrs. Hadley
- James Hong as Ming Lo
- Jean Gillespie as Reporter
- Jack Wells as Reporter
- Stu Gilliam as Policeman
- Jack Griffin as Policeman
- Milt Kogan as Policeman
- Hank Jones as Banana Cop
- Iris Adrian as Housewife
- Henry Slate as Truck Driver

== Reception ==
Vincent Canby of The New York Times criticized the film for its "brainless plot" and overlong running time, stating that director Norman Tokar "doesn't know when to say cut. Every scene and every gag is allowed too much time, which is too bad, because a couple of routines show promise, especially one in which a small boy attempts to retrieve his pet skunk from the girders of a high-rise building under construction. It's not exactly Harold Lloyd, but it's better than looking at a flying Volkswagen."

Variety called the film "a lightweight affair scarcely up to the standards expected of a Disney film but which the Disney label may push to okay acceptance in the family market ... Niven displays his customary flair as a light comedian, and McGavin and Knotts are well cast in comedy roles." Charles Champlin of the Los Angeles Times described the film as "routine but competent and pleasant" and "the kind of well-engineered and undemanding comedy the studio by now can turn out in its sleep. But that is no mean praise, since no one else seems able to make them successfully, awake or asleep."

Gary Arnold of The Washington Post panned the film as "certainly an undistinguished, expendable piece of entertainment, written and directed in a consistently laborious manner that betrays no sense of pleasure in filmmaking, storytelling or even juvenile behavior and family life ... It's difficult to decide which element is more implausible and unappealing, the actions the children take to get this plot on its cumbersome way or the actions the grown-up characters take to play along with the gag."

David McGillivray of The Monthly Film Bulletin wrote that the film "gets off to an amusing start but is soon on thin ice when one is expected to believe that anyone (particularly anyone in a Disney film) could watch his grandchildren being abducted by two strangers and then do nothing about it. Hereafter the plot is cluttered up with comic policemen, two sets of crooks and the adventures of a pet skunk, and by the time the child heroes have been locked up for no good reason in an airtight safe, the film's original concept ('the misadventures of two children who fake their own kidnapping and hold themselves to ransom') has faded almost to extinction."
