= We'll Get By =

Television series

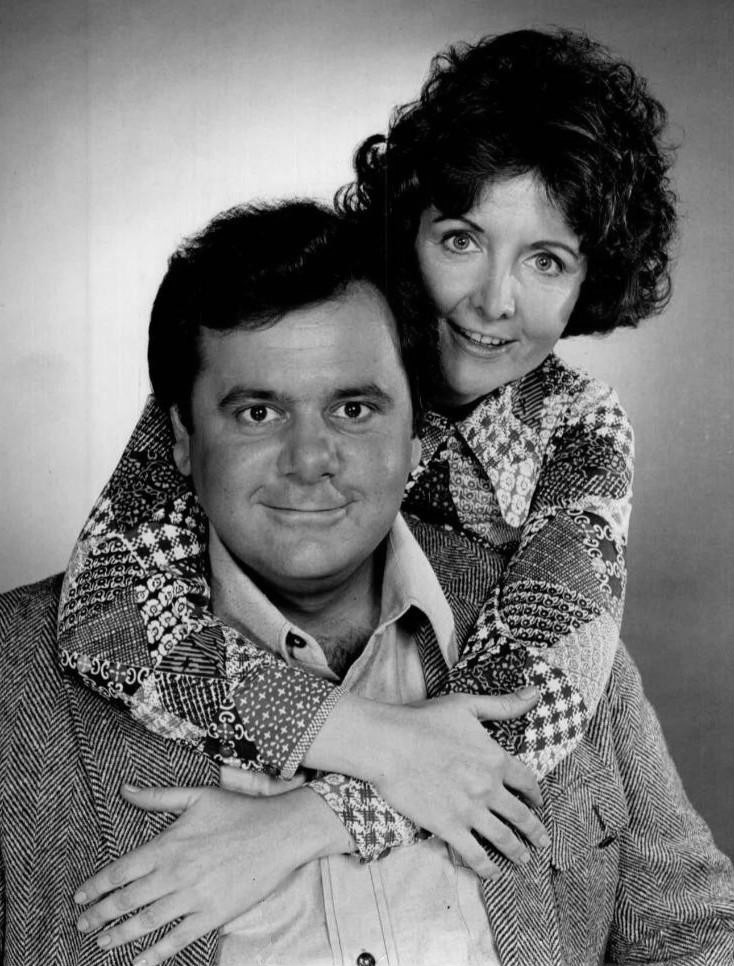
- George (Paul Sorvino) and Liz Platt (Mitzi Hoag)
- Created by: Alan Alda
- Starring: Paul Sorvino; Mitzi Hoag; Willie Aames; Jerry Houser; Devon Scott
- Country of origin: United States
- No. of seasons: 1
- No. of episodes: 12

Production
- Running time: 23 minutes

Original release
- Network: CBS
- Release: March 14 – May 30, 1975

We'll Get By is an American television sitcom that aired on the CBS network. The series was created by Alan Alda and ran for twelve episodes from March 14, 1975 to May 30, 1975.

== Synopsis ==
The show featured a typical middle-class New Jersey family, the Platts, and starred Paul Sorvino and Mitzi Hoag. The show aired originally on Fridays at 8:30 p.m., but could be seen in some markets as rebroadcasts on Sunday mornings for the remainder of 1975.

== Cast ==
- Paul Sorvino as George Platt
- Mitzi Hoag as Liz Platt
- Willie Aames as Kenny Platt
- Jerry Houser as Muff Platt
- Devon Scott as Andrea Platt
