= Still Crazy Like a Fox =

1987 television film directed by Paul Krasny

- Also known as: Crazy Like a Fox: The Movie
- Genre: Drama; Thriller
- Written by: George Schenck; Frank Cardea
- Directed by: Paul Krasny
- Starring: Jack Warden; John Rubinstein; Penny Peyser; Graham Chapman
- Music by: Mark Snow
- Country of origin: United States
- Original language: English

Production
- Executive producers: George Schenck; Frank Cardea
- Producer: William Hill
- Cinematography: Brian West
- Editor: Terry Williams
- Running time: 93 minutes
- Production companies: Schenck/Cardea Productions; Columbia Pictures Television

Original release
- Network: CBS
- Release: April 5, 1987

Related
- Crazy Like a Fox

Still Crazy Like a Fox (also known as Crazy Like a Fox: The Movie) is a 1987 American made-for-television thriller drama film based on the 1984–1986 television series Crazy Like a Fox, which reunited Jack Warden and John Rubinstein as a father and son team of private detectives. It was directed by Paul Krasny and is most noted for the appearance of Monty Python's Graham Chapman in a rare straight role as a Detective Inspector. The film originally aired on CBS on April 5, 1987.

After the cancellation of the original series, it enjoyed a second life in syndicated reruns and the film was greenlit by CBS in an attempt to gauge potential audience interest in reviving the series. While the film pulled fairly solid numbers, it was ultimately decided that the ratings were not high enough to move forward with a new series, and plans to do so were scrapped. However, the film was later split into two parts and added to the Crazy Like a Fox syndication package.

== Plot ==
During a vacation in the United Kingdom, Harrison "Harry" Fox, Sr. (Jack Warden) and Harrison Fox, Jr. (John Rubinstein) inadvertently become the prime suspects in a murder case, and must go on the run in the British countryside with the whole of the police force on their trail.

== Cast ==
- Jack Warden as Harrison Joshua "Harry" Fox, Sr.
- John Rubinstein as Harrison Joshua Fox, Jr.
- Penny Peyser as Cindy Fox
- Robby Kiger as Harrison Joshua "Josh" Fox III
- Graham Chapman as Detective Inspector Palmer
- James Faulkner as the Duke of Trent
- Michael Jayston as Randall Perry
- Rosemary Leach as Eleanor Trundle
- Catherine Oxenberg as Nancy
- Colin Stinton as Thurmond Richards
- Moray Watson as Hubbard
- John Moffatt as Milton
- Maxine Howe as Roberta Bick
- Matt Zimmerman as Donald Bick
- Allan Cuthbertson as Monty Clayton
- John Cater as Rockhill
