= The Tony Randall Show =

American television sitcom (1976–1978)

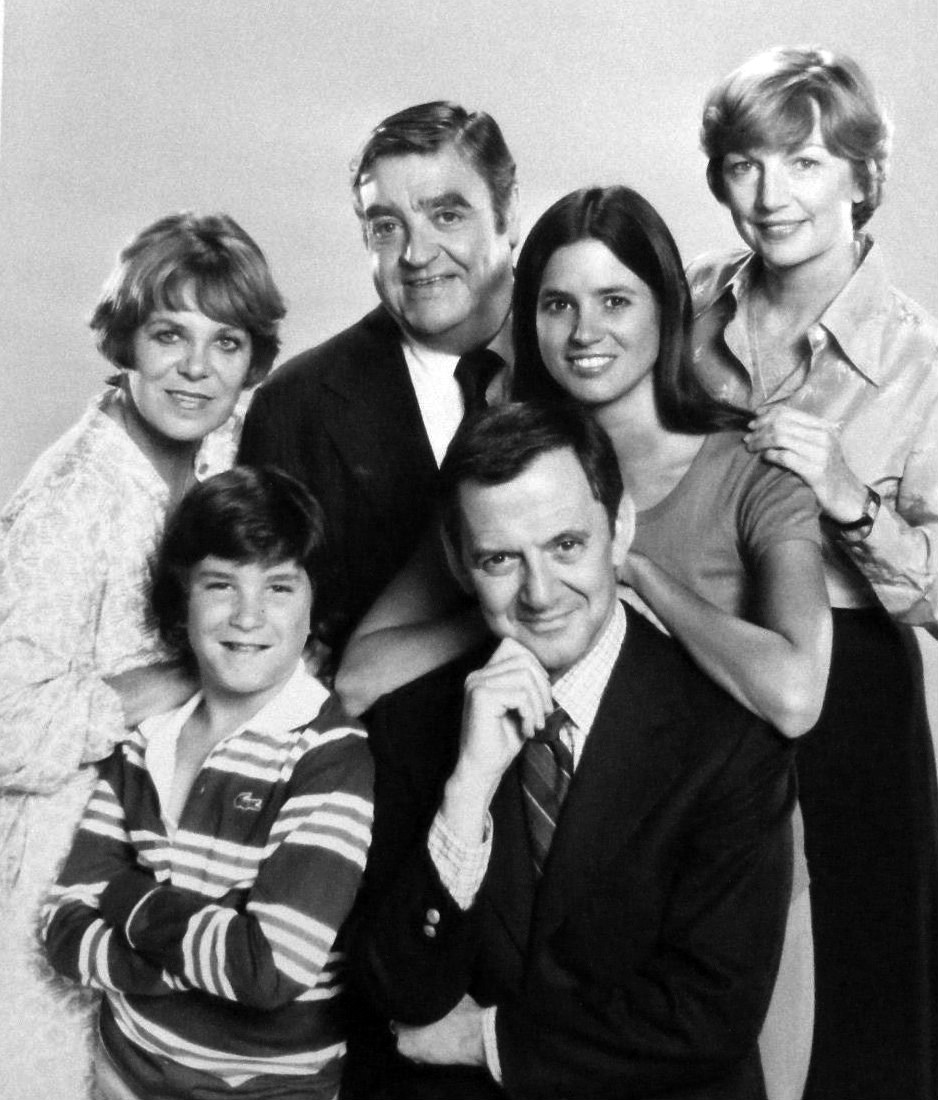
- Front, L–R: Brad Savage, Tony Randall. Back: Rachel Roberts, Barney Martin, Penny Peyser, and Allyn Ann McLerie (1977)
- Genre: Sitcom
- Created by: Tom Patchett; Jay Tarses
- Written by: Gary David Goldberg; Hugh Wilson; Ken Levine; David Isaacs; Patricia Jones; Tom Patchett; Donald Reiker; Jay Tarses; Michael Zinberg
- Directed by: Tony Mordente
- Starring: Tony Randall; Barney Martin; Rachel Roberts; Allyn Ann McLerie; Penny Peyser; Hans Conried; Devon Scott; Brad Savage; Diana Muldaur
- Composer: Patrick Williams
- Country of origin: United States
- Original language: English
- No. of seasons: 2
- No. of episodes: 44

Production
- Executive producers: Tom Patchett; Jay Tarses
- Producers: Hugh Wilson; Gary David Goldberg; Michael Zinberg
- Running time: 30 minutes
- Production company: MTM Enterprises

Original release
- Network: ABC (1976–1977); CBS (1977–1978)
- Release: September 23, 1976 – March 25, 1978

The Tony Randall Show is an American television sitcom that aired on ABC during its first season from September 23, 1976, to March 10, 1977, and on CBS for its second (and final) season from September 24, 1977, to March 25, 1978.

== Synopsis ==
The series starred Tony Randall as Walter Franklin, a widowed and very talented judge, and took place in Philadelphia. The show followed the reserved Franklin dealing with being a single parent, raising his daughter, Roberta (Devon Scott), and son, Oliver (Brad Savage). At times he also had to play surrogate parent to his daffy English housekeeper (Rachel Roberts), whose inedible cooking was a frequent source of humor. She made huge mistakes which contributed to lowering her self-confidence. At work, Judge Franklin had to contend with his stuffy and acerbic secretary, Miss Janet Reubner (Allyn Ann McLerie), and his court reporter, Jack Terwilliger (Barney Martin), as well as presiding over court cases. Actor Zane Lasky played the recurring role of Mario Lanza, an annoying, nerdy, overbearing assistant who irritated Judge Franklin, but who kept getting rehired by Miss Reubner. Another recurring role was played by Diana Muldaur, who appeared as Judge Franklin's love interest, Judge Eleanor Hooper. Annette O'Toole played the role of Melissa (Oliver's teacher, to whom Walter was attracted) in two episodes, one in each season. In the show's second season, Devon Scott was replaced in the role of Roberta by Penny Peyser, and Hans Conried joined the cast in the occasional recurring role of Walter's irascible father Wyatt. Towards the very end of the series run, Walter began teaching a night class in law; Michael Keaton was seen as Zeke Zacharias, one of Water's students, in two late-running episodes.

The show was produced by MTM Enterprises and aired for one season on ABC. For its second season, the series moved to CBS where it aired for one more season before being canceled. Writer/producer Gary David Goldberg discusses behind-the-scenes stories in his autobiography, Sit, Ubu, Sit.

== Episodes ==
=== Series overview ===
Season	Episodes	Originally released		
Season	Episodes	First released	Last released	Network
1	22	September 23, 1976	March 10, 1977	ABC
2	22	September 24, 1977	March 25, 1978	CBS

=== Season 1 (1976–77) ===
No. overall	No. in season	Title	Directed by	Written by	Original release date
1	1	"Pilot"	Jay Sandrich	Tom Patchett & Jay Tarses	September 23, 1976
Judge Walter O. Franklin prepares to go on his first date since the death of his wife.
2	2	"Case: A Question of Qualifications"	Jay Sandrich	Tom Patchett & Jay Tarses	September 30, 1976
Walter tries to hire a new law clerk, and the applicants include a beautiful woman (Brooke Adams), a strange young man named Mario Lanza (Zane Lasky), and Jack.
3	3	"Case: His Honor vs. Her Honor"	James Burrows	David Lloyd	October 7, 1976
Walter starts dating the attractive female judge Eleanor Hooper (Diana Muldaur).
4	4	"Case: Franklin vs. Reubner & Reubner"	Peter Bonerz	Hugh Wilson	October 21, 1976
Miss Reubner thinks Walter might be romantically interested in her, and when he laughs at the idea, she quits.
5	5	"Case: The Snow White Affair"	Michael Zinberg	Lloyd Garver	October 28, 1976
Walter upholds a theatre's right to show a pornographic film, but exercises his authority as a father to stop Bobby from seeing it.
6	6	"Case: Terwilliger vs. Himself"	Harvey Medlinsky	Tom Patchett & Jay Tarses	November 4, 1976
When Jack's work deteriorates, Walter suspects he's having trouble at home.
7	7	"Case: The Ego Affair"	Alan Myerson	Tom Patchett & Jay Tarses	November 11, 1976
Walter gets a swelled head when he starts getting a lot of offers for speaking engagements.
8	8	"Case: The DeNecki Debacle"	Alan Myerson	Hugh Wilson	November 18, 1976
Walter must try a criminal case where the defense attorney, Mr. DeNecki (Stephen Elliott) uses every tactic in the book to stretch out the case.
9	9	"Case: Mario Strikes Again"	Harvey Medlinsky	Gary David Goldberg	December 2, 1976
Walter regrets hiring the perpetually annoying Mario Lanza as his assistant.
10	10	"Case: Franklin in Love"	Harvey Medlinsky	Tom Patchett & Jay Tarses	December 9, 1976
Walter and Eleanor consider getting married.
11	11	"Case: O'Come All Ye Wastrels"	James Burrows	Sy Rosen	December 23, 1976
Walter invites a thief (Dick Van Patten) to spend Christmas at his home.
12	12	"Case: Money vs. Stature"	Hugh Wilson	Hugh Wilson	December 30, 1976
Walter gets a lucrative offer to quit the bench and go back into private law practice.
13	13	"Case: The Hooper Affair"	Michael Zinberg	Patricia Jones & Donald Reiker	January 6, 1977
Walter has to compete for Eleanor when her old boyfriend (Craig Stevens) comes to town.
14	14	"Case: Franklin vs. McClellan"	James Burrows	Ken Levine & David Isaacs	January 13, 1977
Walter deals with another revolt by Mrs. McClellan.
15	15	"Case: Whatever Happened to Mary Jane?"	John C. Chulay	Tom Patchett & Jay Tarses	January 20, 1977
Someone has to be the fall guy when a joint of marijuana is found in Walter's office.
16	16	"Case: McClellan vs. Immigration"	Hugh Wilson	David Lloyd	January 27, 1977
Mrs. McClellan tries to find a husband to avoid being deported.
17	17	"Case: May vs. December"	Harvey Medlinsky	Gary David Goldberg	February 3, 1977
Walter finds himself attracted to a woman (Annette O'Toole) who's too young for him.
18	18	"Case: The Lawndale Report"	Harvey Medlinsky	Gary David Goldberg	February 10, 1977
Walter goes undercover to write a report on the prison system.
19	19	"Case: The Hero Syndrome"	Hugh Wilson	Earl Pomerantz	February 17, 1977
Oliver starts to admire a thuggish hockey player who appeared in Walter's courtroom.
20	20	"Case: Democracy vs. Tyranny"	Tony Mordente	Gary David Goldberg	February 24, 1977
Walter's kids and Mrs. McClellan accuse him of being a "tyrant" and stage a mock trial where he defends himself against the charges.
21	21	"Case: Facing Up vs. Hiding Behind the Drapes"	James Burrows	Earl Pomerantz	March 3, 1977
Walter's life is threatened by a man he sent to prison.
22	22	"Case: The People Speak"	Michael Zinberg	Ken Levine & David Isaacs	March 10, 1977
Walter challenges a veteran incumbent in the election for Superior Court judge.

=== Season 2 (1977–78) ===
No. overall	No. in season	Title	Directed by	Written by	Original release date
23	1	"Franklin vs. the Generation Gap"	Harvey Medlinsky	Patricia Jones & Donald Reiker	September 24, 1977
Walter is shocked when Bobby announces she's going to live with her boyfriend Michael (Michael Burns). Note Penny Peyser replaces Devon Scott as Bobby.
24	2	"The Prodigal Father Returns"	Harvey Medlinsky	Hugh Wilson	October 1, 1977
Walter's estranged father Wyatt (Hans Conried) visits his son for the first time in five years.
25	3	"Walter Screws Up"	Asaad Kelada	Sy Rosen	October 8, 1977
Walter doubts his competence as a judge when he discovers that he convicted an innocent man.
26	4	"Philadelphia Triangle"	Tony Mordente	Gary David Goldberg	October 15, 1977
Mario mistakes Eleanor's kindness for love.
27	5	"Love vs. Excitement"	Michael Zinberg	Gary David Goldberg	October 22, 1977
Walter fears that Jack will become suicidal after he and his wife separate.
28	6	"The Taking of Reubner 1-2-3"	Hugh Wilson	Hugh Wilson	October 29, 1977
An escaped convict (Cleavon Little) takes over Walter's chambers with a gun and holds Miss Reubner hostage.
29	7	"Civil Disobedience"	Harvey Medlinsky	Tom Chehak	November 5, 1977
Franklin is forced to rule against an environmental protester, and when Bobby leads a protest, he jails her for contempt of court.
30	8	"Skin Game"	Harvey Medlinsky	Earl Pomerantz	November 12, 1977
Walter doesn't know how to act around his new clerk, a militant young upper-class black man.
31	9	"New Found Franklin"	Asaad Kelada	Carol Gary	November 19, 1977
When Eleanor thinks their relationship has become dull, Walter tries to make himself a more well-rounded person by joining clubs.
32	10	"Franklin vs. Casanova"	Harvey Medlinsky	Kathy Donnell & Madeline Di Maggio	November 26, 1977
Walter must protect Miss Reubner from the advances of a notorious womanizer (Robert Alda).
33	11	"Bobby vs. Michael"	Tony Mordente	Patricia Jones & Donald Reiker	December 17, 1977
Franklin reacts unexpectedly after Bobby announces she's tired of living with Michael.
34	12	"The Sylvia Needleman Experience"	Harvey Medlinsky	Jay Tarses	December 24, 1977
A predatory real estate agent (Beverly Garland) tries to get Walter to sell his house.
35	13	"Kids' Rights"	Tony Mordente	Bill Dial	January 7, 1978
Mario is hopelessly outmatched when he represents a young girl suing for the right to live with her stepmother.
36	14	"Bobby and Brian"	Tony Mordente	Patricia Jones & Donald Reiker	January 14, 1978
Bobby's new boyfriend (Brian Dennehy) is not only too old for her, but a known gangster.
37	15	"I Live to Dance"	Tony Mordente	Hugh Wilson	January 21, 1978
Jack and Miss Reubner enter a ballroom dancing competition.
38	16	"Twice is Not Enough"	Asaad Kelada	Patricia Jones & Donald Reiker	January 28, 1978
Walter has to choose between Eleanor and Melissa.
39	17	"Dream Maker"	Asaad Kelada	Mary-David Sheiner & Sheila Judis Weisberg	February 4, 1978
Mrs. McClellan's nephew, a photographer, enthrals the Franklins with his tales of globe-trotting adventure, which all turn out to be lies.
40	18	"Eyes of the Law"	John C. Chulay	Tom Patchett & Jay Tarses	February 11, 1978
Walter begins teaching a night school law course, where the only promising student is a blind woman.
41	19	"Phantom of the Poconos"	Ken Luber	Joyce Armor & Judie Neer	February 18, 1978
Walter inherits a mountain cabin that seems to be haunted.
42	20	"Adios, Mr. Chips"	Michael Zinberg	Tom Patchett & Jay Tarses	March 4, 1978
Walter is proud of his night school class's showing on a test, until it turns out they all cheated.
43	21	"The Way it Was"	Asaad Kelada	Blake Hunter	March 11, 1978
Walter and his employees all have different memories of his first day as a judge.
44	22	"Wyatt Loves Bonnie"	Harvey Medlinsky	Gary David Goldberg	March 25, 1978
Walter discovers that his father is in love with Mrs. McClellan.

== Award nominations ==
Year	Award	Result	Category	Recipient
1977	Golden Globes	Nominated	Best TV Actor - Musical/Comedy	Tony Randall
