= Karen Knotts =

American actress

- Born: April 2, 1954 (age 72)
- Education: USC School of Cinematic Arts
- Occupations: Actress, stand-up comedian
- Years active: 1967–present
- Father: Don Knotts
- Website: karenknotts.com

Karen Knotts (born April 2, 1954) is an American actress and stand-up comedian. She is the daughter of Don Knotts.

== Career ==
During her childhood and teen years, Knotts says she and her father often "butted heads" over her desire to enter show business: "I always wanted to be an actress, even when I was young, but he said, 'No, that's not a good life for a child.'" She went on to say that he supported her "100 percent in the end". She studied at Beverly Hills High School, followed by USC School of Cinematic Arts.

Knotts works as a stand-up comic and SAG/AFTRA actor. Her one-woman show, "Tied Up in Knotts", is the story of growing up with her comedian father. It was directed by Andersen Gabrych. She performed it at the Edinburgh Fringe in 2008. She also performs standup comedy on the road. Her television and film credits include “Mayberry Man”, Return to Mayberry, An Occurrence at Black Canyon, One of Our Own, and the Vice Academy series.

She also writes for the stage; her one-woman play Roger and Betsy was nominated for the Merce Awards in 2009. In 2021, she wrote a memoir about her father called Tied Up in Knotts.
