= Charles Cioffi =

American film and television actor (1935–2026)

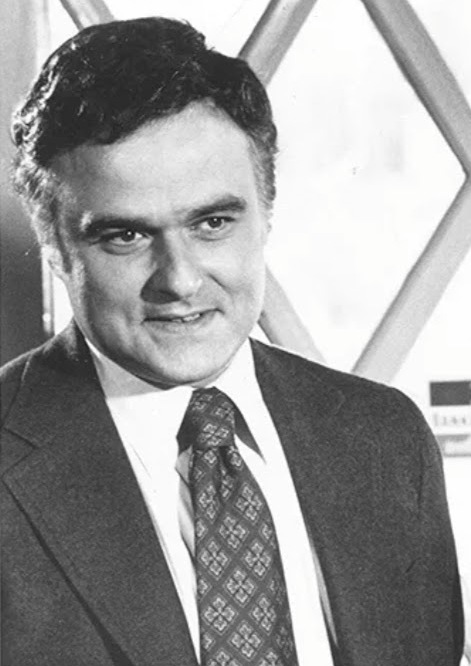
- Cioffi in Get Christie Love!, 1974
- Born: October 31, 1935; New York City, U.S.
- Died: May 22, 2026 (aged 90); Marina del Rey, California, U.S.
- Education: Michigan State University B.A. and M.A.
- Occupation: Actor
- Years active: 1964–2008

Charles Michael Cioffi (October 31, 1935 – May 22, 2026) was an American film and television actor best known as Lt. Matt Reardon in Get Christie Love! opposite co-star Teresa Graves.

== Life and career ==
Charles Cioffi, who was of Italian heritage, was born in New York City on October 31, 1935. He attended Michigan State University, where he became a member of the Sigma Chi fraternity. His film roles include Lt. Vic Androzzi in Shaft (1971), Peter Cable in Klute (1971), and Pop in All the Right Moves (1983).

He appeared on Kojak, Frasier, Wings, The X-Files, Thirtysomething, NYPD Blue, Hawaii Five-O, Cannon, Bonanza, and various other series, including The A-Team (1983) as Gianni Christian, and Days of Our Lives, in which he played Ernesto Toscano. He appeared in several productions both on and off Broadway. He made an appearance on Law & Order as mob boss Frank Masucci. He voiced Chairman Prescott and Adam Fenix in the Xbox 360 videogame Gears of War 2.

Cioffi died in Marina del Rey, California, on May 22, 2026, at the age of 90.

== Filmography ==
=== Film ===
Year	Title	Role	Notes
1971	Klute	Peter Cable	
1971	Shaft	Vic Androzzi	
1973	The Thief Who Came to Dinner	Henderling	
1973	Lucky Luciano	Vito Genovese	
1973	The Don Is Dead	Luigi Orlando	
1974	Crazy Joe	Coletti	
1976	The Next Man	Fouad	
1977	The Other Side of Midnight	Chotas	
1977	The Accuser	Mac Ganter	
1978	Gray Lady Down	Admiral Barnes	
1979	Time After Time	Lt. Mitchell	
1982	Missing	Captain Ray Tower	
1983	All the Right Moves	Pop	
1984	Terror in the Aisles	Peter Cable	Archival footage
1985	Remo Williams: The Adventure Begins	George Grove	
1992	Newsies	Seitz	
1992	Used People	Paolo	
1997	Shadow Conspiracy	General Blackburn	
2001	Amy's Orgasm	Amy's Dad	

=== Television ===
Charles Cioffi television credits
Year	Title	Role	Notes
1969-1970	Where the Heart Is	Ed Lucas	213 episodes
1971	Mongo's Back in Town	Mike Nash	TV Movie
1971	See the Man Run	Captain Dan Dorsey	TV Movie
1971-1975	Cannon	Mario De Marco & Marty	2 episodes
1971-1975	Medical Center	Lew & John Glenson	2 episodes
1972	Bonanza	Dr. Shanklin	Episode: "Shanklin"
1972	Wheeler and Murdoch	DeNisco	TV Movie
1972	The Bold Ones: The New Doctors	Ed Dahms	Episode: "The Velvet Prison"
1972-1973	Assignment Vienna	Maj. Caldwell	8 episodes
1972-1974	The F.B.I.	Verne Dupre & Victor Lamport	2 episodes
1973	Madigan	Albert Chaney	Episode: "The Park Avenue Beat"
1974	Faraday & Company	Charles Durning	Episode: "A Matter of Magic"
1974	Nicky's World	George Kaminios	TV Movie
1974	Get Christie Love!	Matt Reardon	12 episodes
1974	Hawaii Five-O	Dean Lyman	Episode: "Right Grave, Wrong Body"
1975	Matt Helm	Pike	Episode: "Squeeze Play"
1975	The Streets of San Francisco	Burt Dresler	Episode: "Spooks for Sale"
1975	Hawaii Five-O	Charlie Bombay	Episode: “Mcgarrett is missing"
1976	Return to Earth	Dr. Sam Mayhill	TV Movie
1976	The Blue Knight	Kasden	Episode: "Point of View"
1977	Tail Gunner Joe	Logan's Boss	TV movie
1977	Dog & Cat	Ralph Travan	TV movie
1977	Just a Little Inconvenience	Major Bloom	TV movie
1977	Kojak	Arnie Brace	Episode: The Queen of Hearts Is Wild
1977	The New Adventures of Wonder Woman	Raymond Manta	Episode: "The Bermuda Triangle Crisis"
1977	Hawaii Five-O	Jack Fabian	Episode: "Head to Head"
1978	The Six Million Dollar Man	Edward Barris	Episode: "Just a Matter of Time"
1978	The Bionic Woman	Colonel Mostada	Episode: "Long Live the King"
1979	Little House on the Prairie	Bret Harper	Episode: "Someone Please Love Me"
1979	Hawaii Five-O	Norman Klane	Episode: "The Skyline Killer"
1979	Samurai	Amory Bryson	TV Movie
1979	Another World	Kirk Laverty	47 episodes
1980	B.A.D. Cats	Paul Stone	Episode: "Pilot"
1980	Ryan's Hope	Claudis Church	13 episodes
1981	Nero Wolfe	Harold East	Episode: "To Catch a Dead Man"
1981	Flamingo Road	Harrison Bread	Episode: "Hurricane"
1981	McClain's Law	Lu De Martino	Episode: "Let the Victims Beware"
1982	Lou Grant	Councilman Garbers	Episode: "Law"
1982	Taxi	Frank	Episode: "The Road Not Taken: Part 1"
1982	Cassie & Co.	Grebbs	Episode: "A Ring Ain't Always a Circle"
1982	Modesty Blaise	Leo Bazin	TV Movie
1982	Tucker's Witch	Frank Gurell	Episode: "Abra Cadaver"
1982-1986	Simon & Simon	Miller Hampton & Ed Armstrong	2 episodes
1983	The A-Team	Gianni Christian	Episode: "The Rabbit Who Ate Las Vegas"
1983	Trapper John, M.D.	Sergeant Joe Manzari	Episode: "...And for Loyal and Devoted Service"
1986	St. Elsewhere	Senator Gordon Endicott	2 episodes
1986–1987	The Equalizer	Lieutenant Kramer	3 episodes "Counterfire" (S2.E7) "High Performance" (S2.E12) "Suspicion of Innocence" (S3.E3)
1987	As the World Turns	Howard Lansing	2 episodes
1988	Deadline: Madrid	Ed Shaw	TV Movie
1989	Midnight Caller	Kenneth Miller	Episode: "Bank Job"
1989	Thirtysomething	James Warren	Episode: "No Promises"
1989	Dream Breakers	Douglas Sloan	TV Movie
1989	Matlock	Roger Anderson	Episode: "The Starlet"
1989	Peter Gunn	Tony Amatti	TV Movie
1989	Kojak: Fatal Flaw	Chief George Morris	TV Movie
1990	Kojak: Flowers for Matty	Chief George Morris	TV Movie
1990	Kojak: It's Always Something	Chief George Morris	TV Movie
1990	Mancuso, F.B.I.	Alphonse DiGitano	2 episodes
1990	Kojak: None So Blind	Chief George Morris	TV Movie
1990	Days of Our Lives	Ernesto Toscano	32 episodes
1991	Father Dowling Mysteries	Malcolm Rice	Episode: "The Substitute Sister Mystery"
1991	Law & Order	Frank Masucci	2 episodes
1992	L.A. Law	Judge Robert Howell	Episode: "P.S. Your Shrink Is Dead"
1992-1993	All My Children	Lionel Glynn	8 episodes
1993-1997	The X-Files	Section Chief Scott Blevins	6 episodes
1995-1998	The Larry Sanders Show	Dr. Reisman	2 episodes
1995-2000	Chicago Hope	Judge	2 episodes
1995	NYPD Blue	Raymond Schelzo	Episode: "Don We Now Our Gay Apparel"
1995	Murder, She Wrote	Paul Faber	Episode: "Murder in High "C""
1995	Wings	Father Maguire	Episode: "Nupitals"
1996	Dave's World	Carl Braver	Episode: "Gator Bait"
1996	Lois & Clark: The New Adventures of Superman	Dr. Elias Mendenhall	Episode: "Forget Me Not"
1996	Cybill	Dr. Andersohn	Episode: "An Officer and a Thespian"
1996	Kirk	Dr. Benjamin	Episode: "Operation Kirk"
1997	413 Hope St.	Jay Zerrien	Episode: "Heartbeat"
1998	Caroline in the City	Mr. Mazzone	2 episodes
1999-2002	The Practice	Judge Walter Kimball	6 episodes
2001	Columbo: Murder with Too Many Notes	Sidney Ritter	TV Movie
2001	Frasier	Endicott	season 8, episode 18 - Forgotten But Not Gone
2005	Detective	McClelland	TV Movie

=== Video Games ===
Year	Title	Voice role	Notes
2008	Gears of War 2	Chairman Prescott & Adam Fenix	
