= The Girls in the Office =

- Genre: Romance; Drama
- Based on: The Girls in the Office by Jack Olsen
- Written by: Richard Danus
- Directed by: Ted Post
- Starring: Susan Saint James; Barbara Eden; Robyn Douglass; Penny Peyser; Tony Roberts; Joe Penny; Jonathan Goldsmith; David Wayne
- Music by: John Parker
- Country of origin: United States
- Original language: English

Production
- Producer: Barry Oringer
- Cinematography: Andrew Costikyan
- Editor: Tom Stevens
- Running time: 100 minutes
- Production companies: ABC Circle Films
- Budget: $1.8 million

Original release
- Network: ABC
- Release: February 2, 1979

The Girls in the Office is a 1979 American made-for-television romantic drama film starring Susan Saint James, Barbara Eden, Robyn Douglass and Penny Peyser as four young women working in the office of a new department store in Houston, Texas. The film originally premiered as the ABC Friday Night Movie on February 2, 1979.

== Synopsis ==
"The Girls in the Office" are four young women working in the office of the new Nayfak's department store in Houston where the action centers around the quartet as they search for professional success and future husbands while balancing their jobs with their love lives:

- Rita Massaro is an ambitious woman hardened by her past who is determined to have a better, more prosperous life, and is willing to do anything she thinks will help her get it; her vicious and unscrupulous manipulations of events and co-workers eventually backfire;
- Lee Rawlins is a dedicated office manager who reconciles strife between employees and supervisors; she is a career woman and a long-time employee of Nayfak's old department store whose conservative attitude has kept her from fulfilling her life;
- Karen Heineman is a secretary and Tracy Beaumont is the office coffee girl; they are both Rita's co-workers and roommates who, despite their youth and inexperience, soon learn to stand up for their rights.

Ben Nayfak is a pioneer who rose from shirt peddler to tycoon and, as his crowning glory, is determined to build the world's grandest department store. In addition, Beau Galloway is head of the construction crew at Nayfak's who falls in love with Lee; Mike Holden and Bill Pearson are the two right-hand men to Mr. Nayfak jockeying for top position.

== Cast ==
- Susan Saint James as Rita Massaro
- Barbara Eden as Lee Rawlins
- Tony Roberts as Mike Holden
- Robyn Douglass as Karen Heineman
- Penny Peyser as Tracy Beaumont
- Joe Penny as Beau Galloway
- Jonathan Goldsmith as Bill Pearson
- David Wayne as Ben Nayfak

== Production notes ==
The Girls in the Office was filmed on location from October to November 1978 at The Galleria shopping complex located in the Uptown District of Houston, Texas.

During early filming, Susan Saint James accidentally injured her knee and when it became swollen, she was unable to walk through the vast Galleria complex unaided. It was suggested that she use a golf cart and the idea worked so well that scenes were rewritten for her to glide past the various departments with ease.

The film's tagline is: "Meet the people behind the world's most glamorous department store... An intimate look at their hidden lives. The passionate games they play for power... and for love. The men at the top... and the GIRLS IN THE OFFICE."

At the time, The Girls in the Office was the highest budgeted made-for-TV movie at a cost of $1.8 million.

== Home media ==
The Girls in the Office was released on VHS in PAL format in Europe.
