= Dorothy Uhnak =

American writer

Dorothy Uhnak (April 24, 1930 – July 8, 2006; née Goldstein) was an American novelist.

Uhnak was born in New York City. She attended City College of New York and the John Jay College of Criminal Justice.

Uhnak worked for 14 years as a detective for the New York City Transit Police Department.

Uhnak's debut book, Policewoman (1964), was a non-fiction autobiographical account of her law enforcement career. After its publication, she left police work and devoted herself to writing full-time. Her first novel, The Bait (1968), received a 1969 Edgar Award from the Mystery Writers of America for Best First Novel (in a tie with E. Richard Johnson's Silver Street). The Bait was also made into a 1973 made-for-television film of the same title. It was followed by The Witness and The Ledger, which was adapted for the TV-movie and series Get Christie Love! starring Teresa Graves. All three novels featured Christie Opara, an NYPD detective assigned to the Manhattan District Attorney Office, where Uhnak herself was assigned for many years.

After the Opara trilogy, Uhnak branched out into longer, more ambitious police novels such as Law and Order, which became a TV-movie starring Darren McGavin; The Investigation, which was adapted into a TV-movie featuring Telly Savalas as Kojak; and Victims, which seemed to fictionalize the Kitty Genovese murder. Several of her later novels were bestsellers.

Uhnak died in Greenport, New York, reportedly of a deliberate drug overdose.

== Bibliography ==
- Policewoman (1964)
- The Bait (1968)
- The Witness (1969)
- The Ledger (1970)
- Law and Order (1973)
- The Investigation (1977)
- False Witness (1981)
- Victims (1986)
- The Ryer Avenue Story (1993)
- Codes of Betrayal (1997)
