= Jim Lalor =

Irish hurler (1877–1956)

Personal information
- Native name: Séamus Ó Leathlobhair (Irish)
- Born: 16 October 1877 Threecastles, County Kilkenny, Ireland
- Died: 28 February 1956 (aged 78) Freshford, County Kilkenny, Ireland
- Occupation: Shoemaker

Sport
- Sport: Hurling
- Position: Midfield
Club
- Years: Club
- Threecastles
Club titles
- Kilkenny titles: 2
Inter-county
- Years: County
- 1897-1907: Kilkenny
Inter-county titles
- Leinster titles: 6
- All-Irelands: 2

James Lalor (16 October 1877 – 28 February 1956) was an Irish hurler who played as a midfielder for the Kilkenny senior team.

Born in Threecastles, County Kilkenny, Lalor first arrived on the inter-county scene at the age of twenty when made his senior debut in the 1897 championship. Lalor went on to play a key part for Kilkenny during the team's breakthrough and first golden age, and won two All-Ireland medals and six Leinster medals. He was an All-Ireland runner-up on one occasion.

At club level Lalor won two championship medals with Threecastles.

Lalor's brother, Martin, was also an All-Ireland medallist with Kilkenny.

== Early life ==
He was born at Cooleshall, Three Castles, in October 1877 and received his education at Clinstown National School.

== Playing career ==
=== Club ===
Lalor played his club hurling with Threecastles and enjoyed much success during the club's most successful era.

In 1898 he lined out in his first county championship decider. Confederation was the opponent. However, a 4-1 to 2-3 victory gave Lalor his first championship medal.

After losing the county decider in 1901, it was 1903 before Lalor enjoyed further success. A 2-10 to 0-5 defeat of Kilmanagh in a replay gave him a second championship medal.

=== Inter-county ===
Lalor first came to prominence on the inter-county scene when he made his senior debut with Kilkenny in 1897. After receiving a walkover from Wexford in the provincial decider, Kilkenny later faced Limerick in the All-Ireland final on 20 November 1898. Kilkenny had yet to win the All-Ireland, however, they looked set for victory by taking a 2-4 to 1-1 half-time lead. Two Limerick goals early in the second-half changed the complexion of the game. Kilkenny failed to score in the second-half as Limerick went on to win by 3-4 to 2-4.

In 1898 Lalor lined out in his first provincial decider. A 4-12 to 3-2 trouncing of Dublin gave Lalor his second Leinster title, his first on the field of play. This victory allowed Kilkenny advance to an All-Ireland final meeting with Tipperary on 25 March 1900. Kilkenny dominated the first twenty-three minutes, however, Tipperary then took command. In the second-half Mikey Maher scored a hat-trick of goals while Bill Devane scored a remarkable point, kicking the sliotar over off the top of the goalpost. At the long whistle Tipperary had recorded a 7-13 to 3-10 victory, as Lalor ended up on the losing side once again.

After an absence from the team for a number of years, Lalor lined out in another provincial decider in 1903. Dublin were the opponents and the game ended in a 1-5 apiece draw. Kilkenny later objected to the result and were subsequently awarded the title as Dublin's goal was disputed. It was Lalor's third Leinster medal. The 'home' All-Ireland final on 16 July 1905 pitted Kilkenny against Cork. In a disappointing contest Lalor's side were heavily defeated by 8-9 to 0-8.

Lalor added a fourth Leinster medal to his collection in 1904, as Dublin were narrowly defeated by 2-8 to 2-6. Cork provided the opposition in the subsequent All-Ireland decider on 24 June 1906, the start of which was delayed by half an hour due to a heavy downpour. Kilkenny played into the breeze for the opening thirty minutes, and a Dick Doyle gave the team an interval lead of 1-5 to 0-5. Team captain Jer Doheny and goalkeeper Pat "Fox" Maher were singled out for particular praise as Kilkenny claimed a narrow 1-9 to 1-8 victory. It was Lalor's first All-Ireland medal.

Kilkenny made it three provincial titles in-a-row in 1905, with Lalor collecting a fifth Leinster medal following a 2-8 to 2-2 defeat of Dublin. Kilkenny later faced Cork in the All-Ireland final on 14 April 1907. A high-scoring game resulted in a 5-10 to 3-13 victory for Cork, however, the game had to be replayed as Cork goalkeeper Daniel McCarthy was a British army reservist and Kilkenny's Matt Gargan had played with Waterford in the Munster championship. The replayed game on 30 June 1907 was another high-scoring one, with Jimmy Kelly scoring 5-2. A puck-out by Cork's Jamesy Kelleher is said to have hopped over the Kilkenny crossbar. Kilkenny won the game by 7-7 to 2-9, with all seven of their goals coming in a thirty-minute spell. It was Lalor's second All-Ireland medal.

After surrendering their provincial and All-Ireland crowns in 1906, Kilkenny bounced back the following year. A 4-14 to 1-9 defeat of Dublin gave Lalor a sixth Leinster medal.

== Honours ==
=== Team ===
Threecastles

- Kilkenny Senior Hurling Championship (2): 1898, 1903

Kilkenny

- All-Ireland Senior Hurling Championship (2): 1904, 1905
- Leinster Senior Hurling Championship (6): 1897, 1898, 1903, 1904, 1905, 1907
