= Crazy Like a Fox (TV series) =

American television series

- Genre: Crime drama Comedy
- Created by: John Baskin; Roger Shulman; George Schenck; Frank Cardea
- Starring: Jack Warden; John Rubinstein; Penny Peyser; Robby Kiger
- Theme music composer: Mark Snow
- Composers: Ron Ramin; Mark Snow
- Country of origin: United States
- Original language: English
- No. of seasons: 2
- No. of episodes: 35

Production
- Executive producers: John Baskin; Roger Schulman; George Schenck; Frank Cardea
- Producers: Hugh Benson; Philip Saltzman
- Running time: 60 mins.
- Production companies: Cardea-Schenck-Baskin-Schulman Productions; Columbia Pictures Television

Original release
- Network: CBS
- Release: December 30, 1984 – May 3, 1986

Related
- Still Crazy Like a Fox

Crazy Like a Fox is an American television series set in San Francisco, California, that aired on CBS from December 30, 1984, to May 3, 1986.

== Overview ==
The series starred Jack Warden as Harry Fox, a free-spirited private detective who lived by his wits, and John Rubinstein as his high-strung attorney son, Harrison, who unwillingly, and frequently, found himself dragged into his father's cases.

The show's opening would always feature Harry and Harrison talking on the phone in their offices like this:

- Harrison: Hello?
- Harry: Harrison, I need your help.
- Harrison: Dad, you keep forgetting. I'm a lawyer. You're the detective!
- Harry: Aw, come on son. All I need is a ride. What could possibly happen?

Penny Peyser played Harrison's wife and Della Reese had a recurring role as a nurse at the local hospital who had an antagonistic (but joking and friendly) relationship with Harry, often assisting him in his investigations and providing information.

Originally airing Sundays at 9 pm (EST), the show was a hit in its first season, ranking 10th with a 19.9 rating, and initially continued to pull solid numbers during its second season. But midway through that season, CBS brought back its Sunday Night Movie, which displaced the show (along with Trapper John, M.D., which followed Crazy Like a Fox up to that point), resulting in its being bounced around to various time slots, which caused ratings to drop significantly and led to its cancellation at the end of the season. The second season ended up ranking 44th with a 15.0 rating.

Reruns were later shown in syndication and on the CBN Cable Network, and a reunion TV movie, Still Crazy Like a Fox, aired on CBS in 1987, featuring Monty Python's Graham Chapman in one of his last roles.

For his performance, Warden received two nominations for the Primetime Emmy Award for Outstanding Lead Actor in a Comedy Series.

As of 2020, the show airs on the UK GREAT! TV. In 2023, reruns of the show aired for the first time on American television in over 30 years, being added to the MeTV+ schedule, five days a week at 7 PM Eastern Time.

=== Broadcast history ===
Season	Time slot (ET)
1984–85	Sunday at 9:00 pm
1985–86	Sunday at 9:00 pm (Episodes 1–11); Wednesday at 9:00 pm (Episodes 12–18); Saturday at 8:00 pm (Episodes 19–22)

== Cast ==
- Jack Warden as Harrison Joshua "Harry" Fox, Sr.
- John Rubinstein as Harrison Joshua Fox, Jr.
- Penny Peyser as Cindy Fox (Harrison's wife)
- Robby Kiger as Harrison Joshua "Josh" Fox III (Harrison's and Cindy's son)
- Lydia Lei as Allison Ling (1984–1985)
- Patricia Ayame Thomson as Allison Ling (1985–1986)
- Robert Hanley as Lt. Walker
- Theodore Wilson as Ernie
- Della Reese as Nurse Flood (1985–1986)

== Episode list ==
Season	Episodes	Originally released	
Season	Episodes	First released	Last released
1	13	December 30, 1984	April 7, 1985
2	22	October 6, 1985	May 3, 1986
Special	1	April 5, 1987	

=== Season 1 (1984–85) ===
No. overall	No. in season	Title	Directed by	Written by	Original release date
1	1	"Pilot"	Gary Nelson	John Baskin & Roger Shulman and George Schenck & Frank Cardea	December 30, 1984
2	2	"Turn of the Century Fox"	Paul Krasny	Tom Chehak	January 6, 1985
3	3	"Premium for Murder"	Paul Krasny	Stephen Lord and Tim Maschler	January 13, 1985
4	4	"Till Death Do Us Part"	Stuart Margolin	Tim Maschler	January 20, 1985
5	5	"Motor Homicide"	William Asher	Roger Shulman & John Baskin and George Schenck & Frank Cardea	February 3, 1985
6	6	"Wanted Dead and Alive"	Paul Krasny	John Baskin & Roger Shulman and George Schenck & Frank Cardea	February 17, 1985
7	7	"Bum Tip"	Stuart Margolin	George Lee Marshall	February 24, 1985
8	8	"Fox Hunt"	Bob Sweeney	Tom Chehak	March 3, 1985
9	9	"The Geronimo Machine"	Stuart Margolin	W.M. Whitehead	March 10, 1985
10	10	"Fox in Wonderland"	Paul Krasny	Roger Shulman & John Baskin and George Schenck & Frank Cardea	March 17, 1985
11	11	"Fox and Hounds"	Charles Braverman	Story by : Robert Malcolm Young; Teleplay by : Ruel Fischmann	March 24, 1985
12	12	"Suitable for Framing"	Paul Krasny	Tim Maschler	March 31, 1985
13	13	"The Man Who Cried Fox"	Vincent McEveety	Tom Chehak	April 7, 1985

=== Season 2 (1985–86) ===
No. overall	No. in season	Title	Directed by	Written by	Original release date
14	1	"Eye in the Sky"	Paul Krasny	Paul Robert Coyle	October 6, 1985
15	2	"Sunday in the Park with Harry"	Paul Krasny	Harvey Weitzman & Sid Dorfman	October 13, 1985
16	3	"Requiem for a Fox"	Vincent McEveety	Tom Chehak	October 20, 1985
17	4	"Murder is a Two Stroke Penalty"	Don Weis	George Schenck & Frank Cardea and Roger Shulman & John Baskin	October 27, 1985
18	5	"Fox in 3/4 Time"	Charles Braverman	Julie Friedgen	November 3, 1985
19	6	"Desert Fox"	Vincent McEveety	Tim Maschler	November 10, 1985
20	7	"Some Day My Prints Will Come"	Paul Krasny	Story by : David R. Toddman & Philip Saltzman; Teleplay by : Harvey Weitzman & Sid Dorfman	December 1, 1985
21	8	"If the Shoe Fits"	Marc Daniels	Maryanne Kasica & Michael Scheff	December 15, 1985
22	9	"Is There a Fox in the House?"	Paul Krasny	Elroy Schwartz	December 22, 1985
23	10	"Year of the Fox"	Michael Lange	Jack V. Fogarty	December 29, 1985
24	11	"Fox and the Wolf"	Paul Stanley	Aubrey Solomon & Steve Greenberg	January 5, 1986
25	12	"Hearing Is Believing"	Paul Krasny	Julie Friedgen	January 15, 1986
26	13	"Hyde-and-Seek"	Paul Krasny	Paul Robert Coyle	January 22, 1986
27	14	"The Road to Tobago"	Paul Krasny	Tim Maschler	January 29, 1986
28	15	"You Can't Keep a Good Corpse Down"	Marc Daniels	Richard Raskind	February 5, 1986
29	16	"The Fox Who Saw Too Much"	Paul Krasny	Robin Bernheim	February 12, 1986
30	17	"Just Another Fox in the Crowd"	Mike Vejar	Gerald Sanoff	February 26, 1986
31	18	"Fox on the Range"	Michael Caffey	Tim Maschler	March 5, 1986
32	19	"The Duke Is Dead"	Reza Badiyi	Story by : Paul Robert Coyle; Teleplay by : Roger Shulman & John Baskin and George Schenck & Frank Cardea	April 5, 1986
33	20	"Rosie"	Marc Daniels	Story by : Bryce Maritano; Teleplay by : Maryanne Kasica & Michael Scheff	April 12, 1986
34	21	"Dead on Arrival"	Michael Lange	Paul Robert Coyle	April 19, 1986
35	22	"A Fox at the Races"	Sigmund Neufeld, Jr.	Robin Bernheim	May 3, 1986

=== TV reunion film (1987) ===
Title	Directed by	Written by	Original release date
"Still Crazy Like a Fox"	Paul Krasny	Frank Cardea and George Schenck	April 5, 1987

== See also ==
- So Help Me Todd, a current CBS series with a similar premise
