= Martin Lalor =

Irish hurler

Personal information
- Native name: Máirtín Ó Leathlobhair (Irish)
- Born: 20 December 1883 Threecastles, County Kilkenny, Ireland
- Died: 9 January 1957 (aged 73) Freshford, County Kilkenny, Ireland
- Occupation: Hurley maker

Sport
- Sport: Hurling
- Position: Forward
Club
- Years: Club
- Threecastles
Club titles
- Cork titles: 1
Inter-county
- Years: County
- 1897-1905: Kilkenny
Inter-county titles
- Munster titles: 5
- All-Irelands: 2

Martin Lalor (20 December 1883 – 9 January 1957) was an Irish hurler. His championship career with the Kilkenny senior team lasted from 1897 until 1905.

Lalor made his debut on the inter-county scene as a member of the Kilkenny senior team during the 1897 championship. Over the course of the following eight seasons he won two All-Ireland medals as part of back-to-back successes in 1904 and 1905. Lalor also won five Leinster medals.

His brother, Jim Lalor, was also an All-Ireland medal winner with Kilkenny.

== Honours ==
Threecastles

- Kilkenny Senior Hurling Championship (1): 1903

Kilkenny

- All-Ireland Senior Hurling Championship (2): 1904, 1905
- Leinster Senior Hurling Championship (5): 1897, 1898, 1903, 1904, 1905
