= Get Christie Love! =

American crime-drama television series

- Promotional image
- Genre: Police drama
- Created by: George Kirgo & Peter Nelson
- Based on: The Ledger by Dorothy Uhnak
- Developed by: David L. Wolper
- Teleplay by: George Kirgo
- Directed by: William A. Graham
- Starring: Teresa Graves; Charles Cioffi; Jack Kelly; Michael Pataki
- Theme music composer: Jack Elliott; Allyn Ferguson; Glen A. Larson; Stu Phillips
- Country of origin: United States
- Original language: English
- No. of seasons: 1
- No. of episodes: 23

Production
- Executive producers: David L. Wolper; Glen A. Larson; Lawrence Turman
- Producers: Paul Mason; Peter Nelson; Ron Satlof
- Production locations: Colonial Street, Backlot, Universal Studios - 100 Universal City Plaza, Universal City, California; Universal Studios - 100 Universal City Plaza, Universal City, California
- Cinematography: Lester Shorr; Stan Lazan; Meredith M. Nicholson; Duke Callaghan
- Editors: Fabien D. Tordjmann; Jim Benson; Frederic L. Knudtson; Anthony Redman; Robert F. Shugrue; Michael Berman; J. Terry Williams
- Running time: 45–48 minutes
- Production companies: David L. Wolper Productions, Inc; Universal Television

Original release
- Network: ABC
- Release: January 22, 1974 – April 4, 1975

Get Christie Love! is a one-hour American crime drama television series starring Teresa Graves as an undercover female detective which originally aired on ABC from January 22, 1974, until April 4, 1975. Reruns then ran on Friday nights at 10:00 p.m. from April 11, 1975 to July 18, 1975. The starring television role made Graves the second black female lead in a non-stereotypical role for an American weekly series, after Diahann Carroll in Julia. The series is based on Dorothy Uhnak's crime thriller novel The Ledger.

== Synopsis ==
Based on the novel The Ledger, the main character "Christie Opara"—a white, New York City police detective—was dropped completely and "Christie Love" emerged. Det. Olga Ford of the NYPD served as the series' technical advisor and sometime writer. Get Christie Love! was originally broadcast in January 1974 as an ABC Movie of the Week, inspired by the 1970s blaxploitation films such as Tamara Dobson's Cleopatra Jones (1973), and Pam Grier's Coffy (1973) and Foxy Brown (1974). The title character had a catchphrase; upon apprehending a criminal, Love would declare, "You're under arrest, Sugah!" The film proved a success, and consequently spawned a short-lived television series on the ABC network. Twenty-two episodes were shown from September 11, 1974 to April 5, 1975, featuring Charles Cioffi as Love's supervisor Lt. Matt Reardon, who was later replaced by Jack Kelly as Capt. Arthur Ryan.

Financed on a meager budget and heavily sanitized to conform to Graves' religious morals (she had become a Jehovah's Witness since the making of the pilot, and eventually retired from the entertainment industry to focus on her faith), the series was cancelled after one year. One episode featured many of Graves' former Laugh-In co-stars such as Judy Carne, Jo Anne Worley, and Arte Johnson in particular playing a mad bomber. Another notable guest star was Jaclyn Smith, who appeared in an episode entitled "A Fashion Heist".

== Cast ==
Charles Cioffi played Christie Love's boss for the first 12 episodes of the series (his character was featured from the season premiere until "The Longest Fall") and Jack Kelly took over for the last 10 (beginning with the episode "The Deadly Sport"). The storyline in the pilot that had Christie having a secret affair with her police captain (played by Harry Guardino) was dropped for the regular series.

- Teresa Graves as Christie Love
- Charles Cioffi as Lieutenant Matt Reardon (12 episodes)
- Jack Kelly as Captain Arthur Ryan (10 episodes)
- Michael Pataki as Sergeant Pete Gallagher, Christie's partner
- Dennis Rucker as Lieutenant Steve Belmont
- Andy Romano as Lieutenant Joe Caruso (Romano played a different character in the pilot for the series).

This list is for the ABC Movie of the Week of January 22, 1974, which served as the pilot for the series:

- Harry Guardino as Captain Casey Reardon
- Louise Sorel as Helena Varga
- Paul Stevens as Enzo Cortino
- Ron Rifkin as Normand
- Lynne Holmes as Celia Jackson
- Lee Paul as Max Loomis
- Titos Vandis as Spiliolis
- Tracey Roberts as Gwen Fenley
- William Hansen as Dr. Shepard
- Andy Romano as Sergeant Seymour Greenberg
- Davis Roberts as Myron Jones
- Bill Henderson as Sergeant Stoner Martin
- Deborah Dozier as Amy
- Darlene Conley as Virginia

== Episodes ==
=== Television film pilot (1974) ===
Title	Directed by	Written by	Original release date
Get Christie Love!	William A. Graham	George Kirgo	January 22, 1974
Teresa Graves stars as a police detective who tries to get the goods on a huge drug empire. Note: This was originally aired as an ABC Movie of the Week.

=== Season 1 (1974–75) ===
No.	Title	Directed by	Written by	Original release date
1	"Market for Murder"	Gene Nelson	Calvin Clements Jr.	September 11, 1974
Christie infiltrates an international robbery ring and tries to find the top man.
2	"Deadly Betrayal"	Mel Stewart	S : Olga Ford & Pam Fourzon; T : Eric Kaldor & Charles Sailor	September 18, 1974
A criminal accuses Christie and her partner of accepting a bribe.
3	"Emperor of Death Street"	Barry Shear	Olga Ford & Gerald Sanford	September 25, 1974
Christie poses as a heroin dealer.
4	"Pawn Ticket for Murder"	Mark Warren	Joseph Polizzi	October 2, 1974
Christie investigates a murder with a homicide sergeant who thinks that women don't belong on the police force.
5	"Death on Delivery"	Edward M. Abroms	Brad Radnitz	October 9, 1974
Christie goes undercover to investigate a counterfeiting operation.
6	"For the Family Honor"	Sam Ross	Sam Ross	October 23, 1974
A mobster tries to blackmail Det. Caruso.
7	"Highway to Murder"	Sam Ross	Donn Mullally	October 30, 1974
Two Mexican farm workers are accused of murdering a police officer, but Christie thinks otherwise.
8	"Fatal Image"	Richard Compton	Larry Alexander & Robert Earl	November 6, 1974
Christie investigates a murder in the company of a journalist, unaware that he is the killer she seeks.
9	"Downbeat for a Dead Man"	Mark Warren	Paul Mason, Joseph Polizzi & Gerald Sanford	November 13, 1974
Christie poses as a singer in order to investigate a record company owner.
10	"Bullet from the Grave"	Mel Stewart	Booker Bradshaw & David P. Lewis	November 20, 1974
A hit man, supposedly killed in an auto accident, is alive and has been hired to kill Det. Belmont.
11	"Deadly Justice"	Mark Warren	Sean Baine	December 4, 1974
A deranged police academy dropout is executing criminals.
12	"The Longest Fall"	Mark Warren	Glen A. Larson	December 11, 1974
Christie goes undercover at a flying school. This episode features the last appearance of Charles Cioffi as Lt. Matt Reardon in the series.
13	"The Deadly Sport"	Mark Warren	Glen A. Larson	January 8, 1975
Christie takes on two jobs at once. This episode features the first appearance of Jack Kelly as Capt. Arthur Ryan in the series.
14	"Too Many Games in Town"	Bruce Kessler	Lou Shaw	January 15, 1975
A 12-year-old boy is inadvertently drawn into his older brother's scheme to blackmail a Las Vegas kingpin.
15	"Our Lady in London"	Walter Doniger	Lou Shaw	January 29, 1975
When her police captain is blackmailed into taking a criminal mastermind (John Astin) to London, Christie goes undercover as a stewardess to save the day. Linda Dano has a small role as an airport pickpocket.
16	"Murder on High C"	Mark Warren	Elliot Kaye & Albert Elmar	February 5, 1975
Christie goes after a bomber (Arte Johnson) who gives clues to his intended targets in tape-recorded rhymes. This episode featured several of Teresa Graves' former co-stars from "Laugh-In" including Johnny Brown, Judy Carne, Henry Gibson, Gary Owens and Joanne Worley.
17	"My Son, the Murderer"	Phil Bondelli	Gene Levitt	February 12, 1975
Christie tries to help a childhood friend.
18	"The Big Rematch"	Gene Levitt	Howard Berk	February 19, 1975
$250,000 in prize money from a tennis match is stolen.
19	"From Paris with Love"	Bruce Kessler	Elliot Kaye & Albert Elmar	March 5, 1975
A charter service is suspected of being involved in smuggling and murder. Frank Gorshin guest stars.
20	"A High Fashion Heist"	David Friedkin	Michael A. Hoey & B. Gerald Bell	March 12, 1975
A diamond thief (Don Galloway) proves difficult to catch. Jaclyn Smith guest stars as a friend of Christie's who models and turns tricks on the side.
21	"A Few Excess People"	Bruce Kessler	Peter Allan Fields	March 26, 1975
Sgt. Gallagher's Uncle Harry (Phil Silvers) causes problems when he jumps in to help with a dangerous case. Rose Marie guest stars.
22	"I'm Your New Neighbor"	Ron Satlof	S : Matthew Howard aka Douglas Heyes; T : Glen A. Larson	April 4, 1975
When Christie goes next door to ask her new neighbors to keep the noise down, she gets mixed up in something much more sinister. This is a Glen Larson re-write of the very first episode of McCloud titled "Who Says You Can't Make Friends in New York City?"

== Syndication/reception ==
The series has aired in the U.S. on the cable network TV Land in 1997 and on Centric (now known as BET Her) in 2014 as part of the show's 40th anniversary. The show gave the first black woman to serve in a State Police force in the United States, Louise Smith, critical motivation to continue with her chosen career when she faced significant discrimination both in the barracks and on the streets.

== Cultural references ==
- In a scene in Quentin Tarantino's film, Reservoir Dogs (1992), the characters Mr. Pink (Steve Buscemi), Mr. White (Harvey Keitel), Mr. Orange (Tim Roth), and "Nice Guy" Eddie Cabot (Chris Penn), engage in a brief discussion regarding Get Christie Love!.
- In the 2002 Austin Powers movie Austin Powers in Goldmember, the character Foxxy Cleopatra (portrayed by Beyoncé) uses the famous phrase, "You're under arrest, Sugah!"

== Reboot ==
In 2017, producers Courtney Kemp and Vin Diesel became attached to a reboot of the series for ABC, entitled Get Christie Love (without the exclamation point), a co-production between Lionsgate Television and Universal Television, which focused on an African American female CIA agent who leads an elite ops unit. However, ABC later announced that it had decided not to pick the pilot up to series.

== See also ==
- Blaxploitation
- List of female action heroes
