= Devon Scott =

American actress (born 1958)

- Born: Devon Patricia Scott; November 29, 1958 (age 67)
- Occupation: Actress
- Years active: 1975–2005
- Spouse: Mark Elstob
- Children: 1
- Parents: George C. Scott (father); "Pat" (Shirley Patricia née Reed) Scott (mother)
- Relatives: Campbell Scott (paternal half-brother)

Devon Patricia Scott (born November 29, 1958) is an American actress and daughter of actor George C. Scott. She appeared as Roberta Franklin, daughter of Judge Walter Franklin (Tony Randall), in the first season of The Tony Randall Show, which ran from 1976 to 1978; her role was recast for the second season. She is the elder half-sister of actor Campbell Scott.

== Filmography ==
Year	Title	Episode	Role
1975	We'll Get By		Andrea Platt
1976	The Tony Randall Show		Roberta 'Bobby' Franklin
1986	The Last Days of Patton		Sergeant at hospital
1988	Tales of the Unexpected	"The Surgeon"	Jane Chenies
1991	Selling Hitler		Barbara Dickmann
1993	Jeeves and Wooster	"Return to New York"	May Prysock
1994	Class Act	Episode #1.1	Coral Oates
1995	Heartbeat	"Saint Columba's Treasure"	Mary Secker
1998	Mosley	(Episode #1.1) "Young Man in a Hurry"	Lady Grace Curzon
1999	The Ambassador	"Vacant Possession"	Anne McFarlane
2002	The American Embassy	"Long Live the King"	Donna Franklin
2005	Sensitive Skin	Episode #1.3	Dr. Cass' Secretary
