= Bill Devane =

Irish hurler

Personal information
- Native name: Liam Ó Dubháin (Irish)
- Born: 25 November 1871 Nodstown, County Tipperary, Ireland
- Died: 4 May 1940 (aged 68) Nodstown, County Tipperary, Ireland
- Occupation: Farmer

Sport
- Sport: Hurling
Club
- Years: Club
- Tubberadora
Inter-county
- Years: County
- 1895-1898: Tipperary
Inter-county titles
- Munster titles: 3
- All-Irelands: 3

William Devane (25 November 1871 – 4 May 1940) was an Irish sportsperson. He played hurling with his local club Tubberadora and was a member of the Tipperary senior hurling team between 1895 and 1898.

== Honours ==
Tipperary

- All-Ireland Senior Hurling Championship (3): 1895, 1896, 1898
- Munster Senior Hurling Championship (3): 1895, 1896, 1898
