= Sam Rolfe =

American screenwriter (1924–1993)

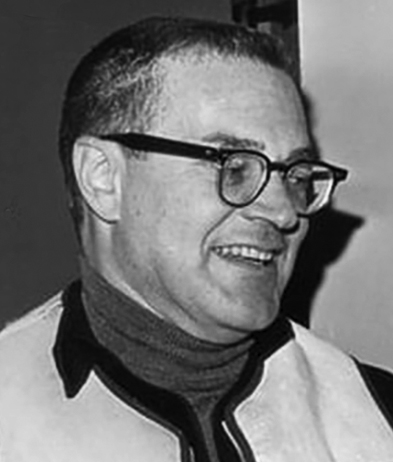
- Born: Samuel Harris Rosenbaum; February 18, 1924; New York City, United States
- Died: July 10, 1993 (aged 69); Los Angeles, California, United States
- Occupations: Screenwriter; showrunner; producer

Samuel Harris Rolfe (born Samuel Harris Rosenbaum, February 18, 1924 – July 10, 1993) was an American screenwriter best known for creating (with Herb Meadow) the 1950–60s highly rated CBS television series Have Gun – Will Travel, as well as his work on the 1960s NBC television series The Man from U.N.C.L.E. and The Eleventh Hour.

A prolific radio, film and television writer for over 30 years, Rolfe described the craft as requiring "Stubbornness, masochism and perhaps some inherited insensitivity to pain. Writing is the most exasperating, most tormenting, loneliest occupation in the world".

== Early life ==
Rolfe was born Samuel Harris Rosenbaum on February 18, 1924, in New York City. He was the first of Max and Sylvia (née Kshonsky) Rosenbaum's two children. Both of Rolfe's parents were Russian immigrants. His father worked at a bookbinding company, while his mother worked as a seamstress.

Rolfe served in the US Army during World War II. After being discharged in 1945 he studied engineering, then advertising under the GI Bill. He worked as a railroad labourer and a dance instructor.

== Early career ==
In a 2005 New York Times article, Rolfe's wife Hilda Newman-Rolfe related how Rolfe started his career: "I met my husband, Sam Rolfe, in 1952. He was a struggling writer, but right after we met he sold a screenplay called The Naked Spur for $25,000 (equivalent to $303,102 in 2025). That was his big break... After we were married, he began to write and produce television shows. He created 13 in all, including Have Gun - Will Travel, The Man From U.N.C.L.E. and The Manhunter".

In 1952 Rolfe shared a two-office bungalow owned by Universal Studios in West Los Angeles with author Ray Bradbury. Rolfe was writing The Naked Spur while Bradbury was working on It Came From Outer Space.

== Radio ==
Rolfe's early career included writing 30 minute radio plays for various broadcast anthology shows. Among them were:

=== Too Hot To Live ===
In 1950 Rolfe was writing for the radio anthology show Suspense. Richard Widmark starred in Rolfe's Too Hot To Live, playing a drifter who finds himself accused of murdering a young cafe waitress. Rolfe's script was later adapted as a television show.

=== Time To Kill ===
In 1951 Rolfe's script Time To Kill was broadcast on Hollywood Star Playhouse. The drama starred Wendell Corey as a would-be bus rider who discovers townspeople have violent plans for him as he waits four hours for the next bus.

== Film ==
=== The Naked Spur ===
In 1953 Rolfe was 27 years old when he wrote his first screenplay The Naked Spur. The film earned him a 1954 Oscar nomination. Co-written with Harold Jack Bloom (who was 27 years old as well), the Western film was a "five-character chamber play" directed by Anthony Mann and starred James Stewart.

In his 1971 essay The Evolution of the Western, film critic André Bazin named the film The Naked Spur "the finest of all Westerns". In 1997, the film was inducted into the National Film Registry as a Western film "with tense psychological complexity through strong, clear story-telling by Sam Rolfe and Harold Jack Bloom".

=== Target Zero ===
Rolfe's screenplay was set during the Korean War, where a unit of American soldiers, along with a three-man British tank crew are trapped behind enemy lines.

=== The McConnell Story ===
Rolfe's script portrayed the career and accidental death of a Korean War jet ace who was killed on August 25, 1954, while serving as a test pilot at Edwards Air Force Base in the Mojave Desert, California.

=== Bombers B-52 ===
Rolfe's script, co-written with Irving Wallace, centered on the crew performing a key test run of the new 200-ton Boeing B-52 Stratofortress.

=== Pillars of the Sky ===
In 1956 Rolfe wrote the script for Universal Pictures' Western, Pillars of the Sky from a novel by Will Henry. Rolfe's script was sympathetic to Native Americans, who were often portrayed as one-dimensional villains. A New York Times review said "It's a pleasure to watch a modest, soldier vs. Indian picture shape into something respectable...Pillars of the Sky, with a nice, surprising mixture of compassion and cynicism, keeps insisting that (the characters) all matter, red and white... Thanks to scenarist Sam Rolfe (or author Will Henry), the actors sound like real people".

== Television ==
Most of Rolfe's career was spent in television. Rolfe flourished as a freelance writer, producer and showrunner over a career that lasted four decades.

In 1963 David Susskind and Dan Melnick hired Rolfe as a vice-president at their Talent Associates-Paramount, Ltd. production company. Three weeks later, Rolfe quit saying he felt better working alone and that he should resign "before I involved myself too deeply".

=== Fireside Theatre ===
Rolfe wrote the screenplay for the 1953 episode "Let the Cards Decide", based on a story by Louis L’Amour.

=== Cheyenne ===
Rolfe wrote the 1958 "The Last Comanchero" episode starring Edd Byrnes.

=== Johnny Nighthawk ===
Co-written by Rolfe, Lou Morheim and Barney Slater in 1959, this Alcoa-Goodyear Theatre episode was an unsold pilot for a proposed series about the exploits of Johnny Nighthawk, the adventurous owner and pilot of a one-plane airline.

=== The Twilight Zone ===
Using a script outline created by Rolfe in 1961, Rod Serling wrote A Quality of Mercy, the 80th episode of the American television anthology series The Twilight Zone.

=== The Eleventh Hour ===
Rolfe was a contract writer for CBS but left in 1962 to produce The Eleventh Hour, a Metro-Goldwyn-Mayer star vehicle for Wendell Corey. The NBC network series was a medical drama about how psychiatric treatment could aid law-enforcement.

Rolfe co-wrote the lyrics to the show's second season theme song "Theme from The Eleventh Hour" with Harry Sukman. The score was written by Irving Elman.

=== Have Gun - Will Travel ===
Rolfe co-created the highly regarded television western series Have Gun – Will Travel for CBS from 1957 through 1963 with Herb Meadow. Rolfe had approached CBS with a show idea featuring a contemporary New York City private eye who perused out of town newspapers for leads for work. The network said they were more interested in a Western, so Rolfe changed both the era and the locale of the proposed show.

Rolfe's primary character was "Paladin", a professional gunfighter named after one of Charlemagne's knights and played by Richard Boone. Not a typical television western cowboy, Paladin was almost an anti-hero. Set in the 1870s, Paladin lived in San Francisco's Hotel Carlton and charged a $1,000 (or higher) fee for his services. If he chose to help someone who couldn't afford his fee, he would work for free.

Have Gun - Will Travel was the third most watched television program in America during the show's first three years. Rolfe co-wrote the show's theme song "The Ballad of Paladin" with Johnny Western and show star Richard Boone. The song was chosen one of the Top 100 Western songs of all time by the Western Writers of America.

Rolfe and Meadow hired a number of new writers during the show's 6-year run, many of whom would later create outstanding television, film and books. Among them: Gene Roddenberry, creator and writer of the original Star Trek series, wrote 23 episodes of Have Gun - Will Travel and won a Writer's Guild award for one of them, Bruce Geller, creator of the TV series Mission: Impossible and Mannix, Sam Peckinpah who would later direct the film The Wild Bunch and Irving Wallace, author of the books The Agony and the Ecstasy and The Man also wrote for the show.

=== The Man from U.N.C.L.E. ===
Producer Norman Felton had been developing a television spy series named Solo with Ian Fleming, the creator of James Bond. Fleming named the proposed series' lead character "Napoleon Solo" but hadn't told Felton the character name had already been used in the script of the upcoming Goldfinger film. Cubby Broccoli, producer of the Bond films, forbade Fleming to continue working on Felton's project. Felton then approached Rolfe, who was at that time working on The Eleventh Hour.

Felton asked Rolfe to create a framework for the series. Rolfe's 80 page prospectus for the show included the show name The Man from U.N.C.L.E., the pilot episode "The Vulcan Affair", which created the backstory for the U.N.C.L.E. organization including the acronym and 30 story ideas. Rolfe's work so impressed Fleming that he tried to buy some of them to use in his Bond books. Rolfe produced the first season of The Man from U.N.C.L.E. and did much of the writing.

Robert Vaughn, who played Napoleon Solo in the series, called Rolfe "the real man from U.N.C.L.E.".

Rolfe made a cameo appearance in the first season, seventh U.N.C.L.E. episode, The Giuoco Piano Affair which aired on November 10, 1964, where he appeared as "Texan" in the party-scene at Gervaise Ravel's (portrayed by Anne Francis) apartment.

==== The Man From U.N.C.L.E. gun ====
Rolfe's attention to detail included specifying special props necessary to create the show's illusion of world spycraft, including the famous "Man From U.N.C.L.E. gun". Rolfe said "I wanted one gun capable of shooting single shots or rapid-fire automatic shots, with sound or silently. I also wanted sleep inducing darts, explosive bullets and just bullets, and a gun that could convert to a long-range rifle. I wanted everything in the U.N.C.L.E. gun, and the one thing I had forgot, I had put in the Thrush gun - an infra-red light, so the Thrush people could shoot at night". The guns themselves actually received 500 fan letters a week, many simply addressed to "The Gun".

==== Departed the show ====
Rolfe left the show at the end of its first season. After his departure the show changed direction and exchanged its subtle, tongue-in-cheek humour for more overt gags, culminating in the high-camp third season. Rolfe did not approve of the change in direction and felt the show lost its way after the first season. In an interview given shortly before his death he commented:

I've always felt U.N.C.L.E. was a show that needed a particular kind of a mind to direct it. You needed somebody that could do drama and then also lay humor into it but could sense when the humor had to be stopped and when you had to make the drama take over. And you could talk forever about it, but unless you walk in with that instinct, you're not going to get it. And I think that some of the people that followed me didn't have an instinct for it. So they got silly with it... They never sat down, they didn't really grasp the drama - that you had to have the dramatic spine.

== Later career ==
=== Dundee and the Culhane ===
Rolfe created and produced Dundee and the Culhane, an American Western television drama series starring John Mills and Sean Garrison that aired on CBS from September 6 to December 13, 1967.

The show combined the Western and legal show genres, following the exploits of two frontier lawyers who provided legal defense to their accused clients. The show was not a success. CBS had bought it on the strength of Rolfe's pilot, but after seeing a few additional episodes and scripts, network officials were convinced that the show would fail before it caught on. CBS decided in September to replace Dundee and the Culhane in December with a Jonathan Winters variety hour.

=== Killjoy ===
In 1981 Rolfe wrote Killjoy for Lorimar Productions. The CBS television mystery centered around a love triangle that perhaps included a missing person who didn't exist. The "finely dovetailed" script earned Rolfe a Mystery Writers of America Edgar Award.

=== The Delphi Bureau ===
In 1972 Rolfe created The Delphi Bureau starring Laurence Luckinbill. The drama series which ran for one season related the adventures of government agent Glenn Garth Gregory who relied on his photographic memory to solve crimes. The show was broadcast on ABC as one of three elements of The Men, a wheel series shown as part of its 1972-73 schedule.

=== Matt Helm ===
After the cancellation of Dundee and the Culhane, Rolfe returned to the spy genre, creating and producing an ABC network television series adaptation of Donald Hamilton’s Matt Helm. The title character was played by Anthony Franciosa. The show aired from September 20, 1975 to January 3, 1976.

=== The Manhunter ===
In 1974, Rolfe wrote the pilot episode script for Manhunter, a Quinn Martin Productions film directed by Walter Grauman starring Rick Dalton, Stefanie Powers, Gary Lockwood and James Olson. Ken Howard replaced Dalton when the CBS network picked up the series, renaming it The Manhunter which ran for 22 episodes until March 5, 1975.

=== Taft Entertainment Company and Hanna-Barbera ===
In the 1960's Cincinnati's Taft Broadcasting Company began buying broadcast production companies such as Hanna-Barbera, Quinn Martin Productions and Sunn Classics and renamed itself the Taft Entertainment Company. In 1980, Sy Fischer, president and CEO hired a number of noted television writers and producers, including Rolfe, Sam Denoff, producer-writer of The Dick Van Dyke Show, Leigh Vance, writer-producer of Hart to Hart, and Fred Silverman, former chief of CBS.

=== The Key to Rebecca ===
The Key to Rebecca, based on Ken Follett's best-selling suspense novel is credited to Rolfe's pseudonym "Sam Harris" for Taft Entertainment in association with Castle Combe Productions. The four-hour mini-series was filmed and was directed by David Hemmings and was scheduled for broadcast in May 1985. It was later shown in the United Kingdom, Scandinavia and other countries where the novel had been popular.

=== Later work ===
Rolfe then developed other crime drama TV shows, creating, writing and producing Rosetti And Ryan, Delvecchio and Kaz.

Rolfe continued to work as a producer and screenwriter right up until his death. He wrote scripts for Star Trek: The Next Generation episode "The Vengeance Factor" and the Star Trek: Deep Space Nine episode "Vortex".

His last major project was based on Ken Follett's On Wings of Eagles. The five-hour television mini-series portrayed former presidential candidate Ross Perot's experiences in Iran. The mini-series was watched by an estimated 25 million viewers.

== Zimmerman House ==
In 1975 Rolfe purchased the Zimmerman House, a landmark home located in the Brentwood neighborhood in Los Angeles for $205,000 (equivalent to $1,226,577 in 2025) from actor Richard Kelton. Designed in 1949 by modernist architect Craig Ellwood, the house was built in 1950 on a 0.83-acre lot, featuring extensive landscaping by landscape architect Garrett Eckbo. After Rolfe's death, his widow Hilda Newman-Rolfe continued to own and reside at the property until her death in 2022. The home and lot was purchased in 2023 for $12.5 million by Chris Pratt and Katherine Schwarzenegger who then demolished the house and flattened the lot.

== Death ==
Rolfe died of a heart attack in 1993, aged 69, after collapsing while playing tennis.

== Accolades ==
- 1954: Academy Award nominee – Best Writing, Story and Screenplay – The Naked Spur
- 1965: Emmy Award nominee – Outstanding Program Achievements in Entertainment - The Man from U.N.C.L.E.
- 1966: 23rd Golden Globes Awards - Best TV Series - The Man from U.N.C.L.E.
- 1967: 24th Golden Globes Awards nominee - Best TV Series - The Man from U.N.C.L.E.
- 1982: Edgar Allan Poe Award winner - Best Television Feature or Miniseries - Killjoy
