= 1972–73 United States network television schedule =

The following is the 1972–73 network television schedule for the three major English language commercial broadcast networks in the United States. The schedule covers prime-time hours from September 1972 through August 1973. The schedule is followed by a list per network of returning series, new series, and series cancelled after the 1971–72 season. All times are Eastern and Pacific, with certain exceptions, such as Monday Night Football.

New fall series are highlighted in bold.

Each of the 30 highest-rated shows is listed with its rank and rating as determined by Nielsen Media Research.

The Prime Time Access Rule, intended to increase diversity in programming and enacted abruptly at the beginning of the previous season was slightly modified, with primetime network programming beginning at 8:00 p.m. Eastern Standard Time from Monday through Saturday and 7:30 p.m. on Sundays, limited to 21 weekly hours. This scheme would remain in place until 1975.

PBS is not included; member stations have local flexibility over most of their schedules and broadcast times for network shows may vary.

== Legend ==
- Gray indicates encore programming.
- Blue-gray indicates news programming.
- Light green indicates sporting events.
- Red indicates series being burned off and other regularly scheduled programs, including specials and movies.
- highlight Lime highlights indicates the number-one most watched program of the season.
- highlight Yellow highlights indicates the top-10 most watched programs of the season.
- highlight Cyan highlights indicates numbers 11-20 most watched programs of the season.
- highlight Magenta highlights indicates numbers 21-30 most watched programs of the season.
- highlight Highlights indicates that it falls in multiple of the above categories.

== Sunday ==
Network		7:30 PM	8:00 PM	8:30 PM	9:00 PM	9:30 PM	10:00 PM	10:30 PM
ABC		Local programming	The F.B.I. (29/19.2) (Tied with The ABC Monday Movie and Kung Fu)		The ABC Sunday Night Movie (23/20.0) (Tied with The Rookies)			
CBS	Fall	**Anna and the King**	**M*A*S*H**	**The Sandy Duncan Show**	The New Dick Van Dyke Show	Mannix		Local programming
CBS	Winter	The New Dick Van Dyke Show	**M*A*S*H**	Mannix		**Barnaby Jones** (25/19.9) (Tied with The Little People and The ABC Wednesday Movie of the Week)		Local programming
NBC	Fall	The Wonderful World of Disney (9/23.5)		**The NBC Sunday Mystery Movie**: Columbo / McCloud / McMillan and Wife / **Hec Ramsey** (5/24.2) (Tied with Bridget Loves Bernie)			Night Gallery	Local programming
NBC	Spring	The Wonderful World of Disney (9/23.5)		**The NBC Sunday Mystery Movie**: Columbo / McCloud / McMillan and Wife / **Hec Ramsey** (5/24.2) (Tied with Bridget Loves Bernie)			**Escape**	Local programming
NBC	April	The Wonderful World of Disney (9/23.5)		**The NBC Sunday Mystery Movie**: Columbo / McCloud / McMillan and Wife / **Hec Ramsey** (5/24.2) (Tied with Bridget Loves Bernie)			Night Gallery	Local programming

Note: 60 Minutes aired at 6:00-7:00 pm on CBS from January to June 1973.

== Monday ==
Network		8:00 PM	8:30 PM	9:00 PM	9:30 PM	10:00 PM	10:30 PM
ABC	Fall	**The Rookies** (23/20.0) (Tied with The ABC Sunday Night Movie)		ABC NFL Monday Night Football (18/21.0)			
ABC	Winter	**The Rookies** (23/20.0) (Tied with The ABC Sunday Night Movie)		ABC Monday Night Movie (29/19.2) (Tied with The F.B.I. and Kung Fu)			
CBS	Fall	Gunsmoke (7/23.6) (Tied with The Mary Tyler Moore Show)		Here's Lucy (15/21.9)	The Doris Day Show	**The New Bill Cosby Show**	
CBS	Spring	Gunsmoke (7/23.6) (Tied with The Mary Tyler Moore Show)		Here's Lucy (15/21.9)	The Doris Day Show	Medical Center	
NBC	Fall	Rowan & Martin's Laugh-In		NBC Monday Night at the Movies (28/19.3)			
NBC	Summer	The Baseball World of Joe Garagiola (8:00) / Monday Night Baseball (8:15)					

== Tuesday ==
Network		8:00 PM	8:30 PM	9:00 PM	9:30 PM	10:00 PM	10:30 PM
ABC		**Temperatures Rising**	ABC Tuesday Movie of the Week (17/21.5)			Marcus Welby, M.D. (13/22.9)	
CBS		**Maude** (4/24.7)	Hawaii Five-O (3/25.2)		The New CBS Tuesday Night Movie		
NBC	Fall	Bonanza		The Bold Ones: The New Doctors		**NBC Reports** / First Tuesday* / NBC White Paper / **America: A Personal History of the United States**	
NBC	Winter	NBC Tuesday Night at the Movies				**NBC Reports** / First Tuesday* / NBC White Paper / **America: A Personal History of the United States**	

* formerly Chronolog

== Wednesday ==
Network		8:00 PM	8:30 PM	9:00 PM	9:30 PM	10:00 PM	10:30 PM
ABC	Fall	**The Paul Lynde Show**	ABC Wednesday Movie of the Week (25/19.9) (Tied with Barnaby Jones and The Little People)			**The Julie Andrews Hour**	
ABC	Winter	**The Paul Lynde Show**	ABC Wednesday Movie of the Week (25/19.9) (Tied with Barnaby Jones and The Little People)			Owen Marshall, Counselor at Law	
ABC	Summer	**Thicker than Water**	ABC Wednesday Movie of the Week (25/19.9) (Tied with Barnaby Jones and The Little People)			Owen Marshall, Counselor at Law	
ABC	August	**Love Thy Neighbor**	ABC Wednesday Movie of the Week (25/19.9) (Tied with Barnaby Jones and The Little People)			Owen Marshall, Counselor at Law	
CBS	Fall	The Carol Burnett Show (22/20.3)		Medical Center (19/20.6) (Tied with The Partridge Family and The Waltons)		Cannon (14/22.4)	
CBS	Winter	The Sonny & Cher Comedy Hour		Medical Center (19/20.6) (Tied with The Partridge Family and The Waltons)		Cannon (14/22.4)	
CBS	Spring	The Sonny & Cher Comedy Hour		Dan August (R)		Cannon (14/22.4)	
NBC		Adam-12 (11/23.3)	NBC Wednesday Mystery Movie: **Madigan** / **Cool Million** / **Banacek**			**Search**	

Note: Dan August consisted of reruns of the 1970-1971 ABC series.

== Thursday ==
Network		8:00 PM	8:30 PM	9:00 PM	9:30 PM	10:00 PM	10:30 PM
ABC	Fall	The Mod Squad		**The Men**: **Assignment Vienna** / **The Delphi Bureau** / **Jigsaw**		Owen Marshall, Counselor at Law	
ABC	Winter	The Mod Squad		**Kung Fu** (29/19.2) (Tied with The ABC Monday Movie and The F.B.I.)		**The Streets of San Francisco**	
CBS		**The Waltons** (19/20.6) (Tied with The Partridge Family and Medical Center)		CBS Thursday Night Movie			
NBC	Fall	The Flip Wilson Show (12/23.1)		Ironside (10/23.4)		The Dean Martin Show	
NBC	Summer	**The Helen Reddy Show**		Ironside (10/23.4)		**Dean Martin Presents Music Country**	

== Friday ==
Network		8:00 PM	8:30 PM	9:00 PM	9:30 PM	10:00 PM	10:30 PM
ABC	Fall	The Brady Bunch	The Partridge Family (19/20.6) (Tied with The Waltons and Medical Center)	Room 222	The Odd Couple	Love, American Style	
ABC	Summer	The Brady Bunch	The Odd Couple	Room 222	**Love Thy Neighbor**	Love, American Style	
ABC	Follow-up	The Brady Bunch	The Odd Couple	Room 222	The Corner Bar	Love, American Style	
CBS	Fall	The Sonny & Cher Comedy Hour		The CBS Friday Night Movie			
CBS	December	Mission: Impossible		The CBS Friday Night Movie			
CBS	Summer	60 Minutes		The CBS Friday Night Movie			
NBC	Fall	Sanford and Son (2/27.6)	**The Little People** (25/19.9) (Tied with Barnaby Jones and The ABC Wednesday Movie of the Week)	**Ghost Story**		**Banyon**	
NBC	Winter	Sanford and Son (2/27.6)	**The Little People** (25/19.9) (Tied with Barnaby Jones and The ABC Wednesday Movie of the Week)	**Circle of Fear**		**The Bobby Darin Show**	

Note: Ghost Story was retooled slightly and retitled Circle of Fear (under the same production team) with the episode broadcast January 5, 1973.

== Saturday ==
Network		8:00 PM	8:30 PM	9:00 PM	9:30 PM	10:00 PM	10:30 PM
ABC	Fall	Alias Smith and Jones		**The Streets of San Francisco**		The Sixth Sense	
ABC	Winter	**Here We Go Again**	**A Touch of Grace**	**The Julie Andrews Hour**		**The Men**: **Assignment Vienna** / **The Delphi Bureau** / **Jigsaw**	
ABC	May	**Here We Go Again**	**The Paul Lynde Show**	**The Strauss Family**		**The Men**: **Assignment Vienna** / **The Delphi Bureau** / **Jigsaw**	
ABC	Summer	**Here We Go Again**	**The Paul Lynde Show**	**The Burns and Schreiber Comedy Hour**		**The Men**: **Assignment Vienna** / **The Delphi Bureau** / **Jigsaw**	
CBS	Fall	All in the Family (1/33.3)	**Bridget Loves Bernie** (5/24.2) (Tied with The NBC Sunday Mystery Movie)	The Mary Tyler Moore Show (7/23.6) (Tied with Gunsmoke)	**The Bob Newhart Show** (16/21.8)	Mission: Impossible	
CBS	December	All in the Family (1/33.3)	**Bridget Loves Bernie** (5/24.2) (Tied with The NBC Sunday Mystery Movie)	The Mary Tyler Moore Show (7/23.6) (Tied with Gunsmoke)	**The Bob Newhart Show** (16/21.8)	The Carol Burnett Show (22/20.3)	
CBS	Summer	All in the Family (1/33.3)	**Bridget Loves Bernie** (5/24.2) (Tied with The NBC Sunday Mystery Movie)	The Mary Tyler Moore Show (7/23.6) (Tied with Gunsmoke)	**The Bob Newhart Show** (16/21.8)	Mission: Impossible	
NBC		Emergency!		NBC Saturday Night at the Movies			

== By network ==
=== ABC ===
**Returning Series**

- The ABC Monday Night Movie
- ABC NFL Monday Night Football
- The ABC Sunday Night Movie
- ABC Tuesday Movie of the Week
- ABC Wednesday Movie of the Week
- Alias Smith and Jones
- The Brady Bunch
- The Corner Bar
- The F.B.I.
- Love, American Style
- Marcus Welby, M.D.
- The Mod Squad
- The Odd Couple
- Owen Marshall, Counselor at Law
- The Partridge Family
- Room 222
- The Sixth Sense

**New Series**

- **The Burns and Schreiber Comedy Hour** *
- **Here We Go Again** *
- **The Julie Andrews Hour**
- **Kung Fu**
- **Love Thy Neighbor** *
- **The Men: Assignment Vienna / The Delphi Bureau / Jigsaw**
- **The Paul Lynde Show**
- **The Rookies**
- **The Strauss Family** *
- **The Streets of San Francisco**
- **Temperatures Rising**
- **Thicker than Water** *
- **A Touch of Grace** *

Not returning from 1971–72:

- The ABC Comedy Hour
- Bewitched
- The Courtship of Eddie's Father
- Getting Together
- The Ken Berry "Wow" Show
- Longstreet
- The Man and the City
- The Marty Feldman Comedy Machine
- Monday Night Special
- Nanny and the Professor
- The Persuaders!
- Shirley's World
- The Smith Family
- The Super

=== CBS ===
**Returning Series**

- 60 Minutes
- All in the Family
- Cannon
- The Carol Burnett Show
- The Doris Day Show
- Gunsmoke
- Hawaii Five-O
- Here's Lucy
- Mannix
- The Mary Tyler Moore Show
- Medical Center
- Mission: Impossible
- The New CBS Tuesday Night Movies
- The New Dick Van Dyke Show
- The Sonny & Cher Comedy Hour
- CBS Thursday Night Movie

**New Series**

- **Anna and the King**
- **Barnaby Jones** *
- **The Bob Newhart Show**
- **Bridget Loves Bernie**
- **M*A*S*H**
- **Maude**
- **The New Bill Cosby Show**
- **The Sandy Duncan Show**
- **The Waltons**

Not returning from 1971–72:

- Arnie
- Bearcats!
- Cade's County
- The Chicago Teddy Bears
- The David Steinberg Show
- The Don Rickles Show
- Funny Face
- The Glen Campbell Goodtime Hour
- The Jerry Reed When You're Hot You're Hot Hour
- The John Byner Comedy Hour
- The Life of Leonardo da Vinci
- Me and the Chimp
- My Three Sons
- O'Hara, U.S. Treasury
- Suspense Theatre

=== NBC ===
**Returning Series**

- Adam-12
- The Bold Ones
- Bonanza
- Columbo
- The Dean Martin Show
- Emergency!
- First Tuesday
- The Flip Wilson Show
- Ironside
- McCloud
- McMillan & Wife
- Monday Night Baseball
- NBC Action Playhouse
- NBC Monday Night at the Movies
- The NBC Mystery Movie
- NBC Saturday Night at the Movies
- Night Gallery
- Rowan & Martin's Laugh-In
- Sanford and Son
- The Wonderful World of Disney

**New Series**

- **Banacek**
- **Banyon**
- **The Bobby Darin Show**
- **Cool Million**
- **Dean Martin Presents Music Country** *
- **Escape** *
- **Ghost Story**/**Circle of Fear**
- **Hec Ramsey**
- **The Helen Reddy Show** *
- **The Little People** (retitled The Brian Keith Show in 1973–74)
- **Love Thy Neighbor**
- **Madigan**
- **The Magician** *
- **NBC Reports**
- **Search**

Not returning from 1971–72:

- The D.A.
- Dean Martin Presents the Bobby Darin Amusement Co.
- The Funny Side
- The Good Life
- The Jimmy Stewart Show
- NBC Reports
- Nichols
- The Partners
- Sarge

Note: The * indicates that the program was introduced in midseason.
