= Jigsaw (American TV series) =

American crime television series

- Genre: Crime drama
- Written by: Walter Doniger; Jerrold Freedman; David Friedkin; Ken Pettus; Mark Rodgers; Robert E. Thompson; Leigh Vance
- Directed by: Marc Daniels; Walter Grauman; Barry Shear
- Starring: James Wainwright; Pernell Roberts
- Country of origin: United States
- Original language: English
- No. of seasons: 1
- No. of episodes: 8

Production
- Producers: Stanley Kallis; Harry Tatelman
- Running time: 60 mins.
- Production company: Universal Television

Original release
- Network: ABC
- Release: September 20, 1972 – March 3, 1973

Jigsaw is a television crime drama that aired as an element of the wheel series The Men, part of the ABC network's 1972-73 lineup. Universal Television produced Jigsaw; the same studio had previously been responsible for a series which, in part, inspired The Men: The NBC Mystery Movie.

== Overview ==
The program starred James Wainwright as Lt. Frank Dain, who worked as an investigator for the California State Police Department's Bureau of Missing Persons. Dain was a rebel who chafed at standard police procedures and techniques, but was always effective in finding the person for whom he was searching. He pieced each case together as if it were a jigsaw puzzle. Shortly before the series' cancellation, Dain was booted from the bureau and set up shop as a private eye.

== Episodes ==
No.	Title	Original release date
0	"Jigsaw" "Man on the Move"	March 26, 1972
Pilot.
1	"A Badge on Fire"	September 20, 1972
2	"Hard Time"	October 12, 1972
3	"The Bradley Affair"	November 2, 1972
4	"To Stalk the Night"	November 30, 1972
5	"Finder's Fee"	December 21, 1972
6	"Kiss the Dream Goodbye"	February 17, 1973
7	"Girl on the Run"	February 24, 1973
8	"In Case of Emergency, Notify Clint Eastwood"	March 3, 1973
