= Assignment Vienna =

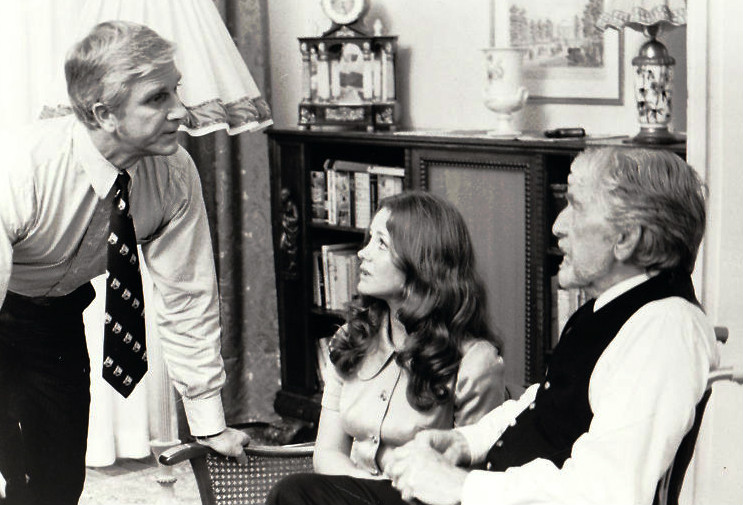
- An escaped convict (Leslie Nielsen) holds a father and daughter hostage, 1972.
- Genre: Drama
- Created by: Eric Bercovici; Jerry Ludwig
- Starring: Robert Conrad; Charles Cioffi; Anton Diffring
- Country of origin: United States
- Original language: English
- No. of seasons: 1
- No. of episodes: 8

Production
- Running time: 60 minutes
- Production company: MGM Television

Original release
- Network: ABC
- Release: September 28, 1972 – February 24, 1973

Assignment Vienna is an American drama television series aired in the United States by ABC as an element in its 1972–73 wheel series The Men. The series, created by Eric Bercovici and Jerry Ludwig, was made by Metro-Goldwyn-Mayer Television.

== Synopsis ==
Assignment Vienna told the story of Jake Webster (Robert Conrad), an American expatriate in Vienna who was the operator of Jake's Bar & Grill, an American-style establishment near the scenic heart of the city. In fact, the business was a cover for Jake's actual reason for being in Vienna. He was involved in tracking down various spies and international criminals at the behest of U.S. intelligence, which apparently held something against him which, if disclosed, would have resulted in his being deported from Austria and apparently then incarcerated in the United States. Jake's liaison with U.S. intelligence was a Major Caldwell (Charles Cioffi). Anton Diffring played Inspector Hoffman of the Vienna police.

The Men initially aired on Thursday nights but was moved at midseason to Saturday nights. It did not garner a large share of viewers in either time slot and none of the elements were renewed. The program was shot on location in Vienna.

== Pilot ==
The pilot film, called Assignment: Munich and aired earlier in 1972, had the same three main characters, but a different cast (Jake, Major Caldwell, and Inspector Hoffman were played by Roy Scheider, Richard Basehart, and Werner Klemperer, respectively) and was filmed on location in Munich. The location for the series was changed to prevent any disruption to filming caused by that year's Olympic Games, and Scheider chose not to return for the series in favour of a movie career.

== Score ==
In 2010, Film Score Monthly released Dave Grusin's series theme and three episode scores (along with John Parker's two additional scores) as part of their five-disc collection of MGM television music, TV Omnibus: Volume One (1962-1976).

== Cast ==
- Robert Conrad as Jake Webster
- Charles Cioffi as Maj. Caldwell
- Anton Diffring as Inspector Hoffman

== Episode list ==
No.	Title	Directed by	Written by	Original release date
1	"The Last Target"	Paul Krasny	Eric Bercovici & Jerry Ludwig	September 28, 1972
2	"Hot Potato"	Paul Krasny	Eric Bercovici & Jerry Ludwig	October 19, 1972
3	"Queen's Gambit"	Paul Stanley	D.C. Fontana	November 9, 1972
4	"Annalisa"	Paul Krasny	Eric Bercovici & Jerry Ludwig	December 7, 1972
5	"There Was an Old Woman"	Alexander Singer	Mark Rodgers	January 13, 1973
6	"A Deadly Shade of Green"	Alexander Singer	Eric Bercovici & Jerry Ludwig	January 27, 1973
7	"So Long, Charley"	Paul Krasny	Gene L. Coon	February 3, 1973
8	"Soldier of Fortune"	Bruce Kessler	Gene L. Coon	March 10, 1973
