= Manhattan Manhunt =

Manhattan Manhunt may refer to:

- "Manhattan Manhunt" (CSI: NY episode), a crossover between CSI: Miami and CSI: NY
- "Manhattan Manhunt", an episode of McCloud
