= The Delphi Bureau =

- Genre: Dramatic television series
- Starring: Laurence Luckinbill
- Country of origin: United States
- Original language: English
- No. of seasons: 1
- No. of episodes: 8 + 1 pilot film

Production
- Producers: James Schmerer, Sam Rolfe
- Production locations: Warner Brothers Burbank Studios, California, USA
- Running time: 44-52 minutes
- Production company: Warner Bros. Television

Original release
- Network: ABC
- Release: October 5, 1972 – March 31, 1973

The Delphi Bureau is an American dramatic television series aired in the United States by ABC as one of three elements of The Men, a wheel series shown as part of its 1972-73 schedule.

The Delphi Bureau starred Laurence Luckinbill as Glenn Garth Gregory, a man with a photographic memory, whose obscure United States Government "agency" ostensibly did obscure research for the President of the United States. Its actual role was counter-espionage and its main operative was Gregory, whose liaison with the group's unnamed superiors was Sybil Van Lowreen (Anne Jeffreys), a Washington D.C. society hostess (Celeste Holm had played Sybil Van Lowreen in the series' pilot film).

A framing design for each episode involved a limerick, a single new line of which was added for each segment of the show, until the entire limerick was completed in the final segment.

== Episode list ==
| No. | Title | Original release date | Prod. code |
|---|---|---|---|
| 0 | The Delphi Bureau: The Merchant of Death Assignment | March 6, 1972 | 23007 |
Pilot.
| 1 | "The Deadly Little Errand Project" | October 5, 1972 | 166081 |
The White House sends agent Glenn Garth Gregory to the rescue of a missing agent with 10 million dollars in ransom handcuffed to his wrist in a briefcase.
| 2 | "The Man Upstairs–The Man Downstairs Project" | October 26, 1972 | 166085 |
| 3 | "The White Plague Project" | November 16, 1972 | 166082 |
Glenn becomes involved with gangsters and a pretty botanist while investigating a greenhouse fire.
| 4 | "The Top Secret Secret Project" | December 14, 1972 | 166083 |
| 5 | "The Terror Broker Project" | March 17, 1973 | 166088 |
| 6 | "The Day of Justice Project" | March 27, 1973 | 166087 |
| 7 | "The Self-Destruct Project" | March 31, 1973 | 166086 |
When members of a peace organization steal a canister of an extremely dangerous defoliant, Gregory goes in search of the culprits.
| 8 | "The Face That Never Was Project" | April 7, 1973 | 166084 |
