= Sidney Fine =

Sidney Fine may refer to:

- Sidney A. Fine (1903–1982), Democratic member of the United States House of Representatives from New York
- Sidney Fine (historian) (1920–2009), professor of history at the University of Michigan
- Sidney Fine (composer) (1904–2002), orchestrator and television composer
