= Cool Million =

1972 American television series

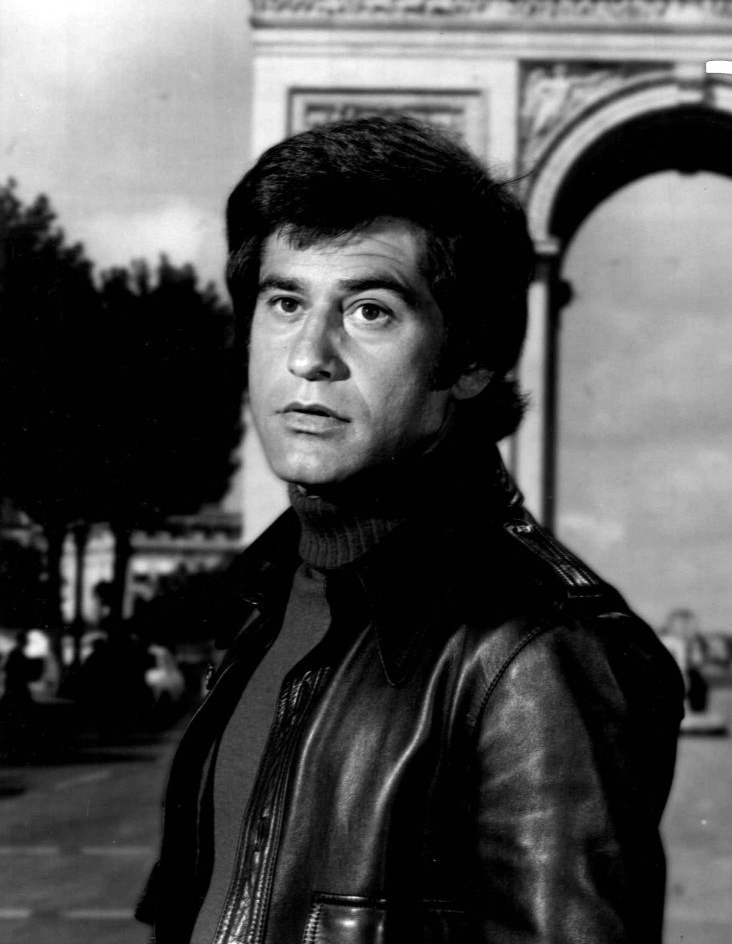
- James Farentino as Jefferson Keyes.
- Genre: Crime drama
- Created by: Larry Cohen
- Starring: James Farentino; John Vernon; Barbara Bouchet; Christine Belford
- Theme music composer: Pete Rugolo
- Country of origin: United States
- Original language: English
- No. of seasons: 1
- No. of episodes: 5

Production
- Executive producers: George Eckstein; Roy Huggins
- Producers: David J. O'Connell; Jo Swerling, Jr.
- Camera setup: Single-camera
- Running time: 90 mins.
- Production companies: Public Arts Films; Universal TV

Original release
- Network: NBC
- Release: October 28 – December 20, 1972

Related
- The NBC Wednesday Mystery Movie

Cool Million is an American crime drama series that aired on NBC as an element in its "wheel series" The NBC Wednesday Mystery Movie during its 1972–73 schedule.

== Synopsis ==
James Farentino starred as Jefferson Keyes, a former agent in the clandestine services of the Central Intelligence Agency who, after he left "The Company", as it was also called by its insiders, had established his own private detective agency. Keyes's agency had, indeed, become so successful that he now charged his prospective clients a fee of $1,000,000 (hence the title) per case, which enabled him to live a fabulous lifestyle including his own executive jet.

== Episode list ==
No.	Title	Directed by	Written by	Original release date
1	"Mask of Marcella"	Gene Levitt	Larry Cohen	October 16, 1972
2	"Hunt for a Lonely Girl"	Gene Levitt	Gene Levitt	October 25, 1972
3	"Assault on Gavaloni"	John Badham	Story by : Roy Huggins; Teleplay by : Juanita Bartlett	November 22, 1972
4	"The Abduction of Baynard Barnes"	Barry Shear	Story by : Roy Huggins; Teleplay by : Richard Morris	December 6, 1972
5	"The Million Dollar Misunderstanding"	Daryl Duke	Story by : Roy Huggins; Teleplay by : Juanita Bartlett	December 20, 1972

== Reception ==
Cool Million proved to be less successful than several other elements of the NBC Mystery Movie and was not renewed for further episodes after its initial order.

== See also ==
- List of The NBC Mystery Movie episodes
