= Mark VII Limited =

Production company of actor and filmmaker Jack Webb

- The Mark VII Limited logo as it appears in 1954.
- Industry: Television production, Film
- Founded: 1951; 75 years ago
- Founder: Jack Webb
- Defunct: 1982; 44 years ago
- Fate: Dissolved
- Headquarters: Burbank, California, United States
- Key people: Jack Webb (president)
- Owner: Jack Webb

Mark VII Limited (formerly Mark VII Productions, pronounced "Mark 7") was the production company of actor and filmmaker Jack Webb, and was active from 1951 until Webb's death in 1982. Many of its series were produced in association with Universal Television; most of them were originally broadcast on the NBC television network in the United States.

In 1962, Webb had signed a deal with Warner Bros. in order to produce motion pictures and television shows as an independent producer.

Webb was employed by Warner Bros. Television in 1963, and as a result, he attempted to absorb the company. After failing, he resurrected the company, with Selena Mead as its first project, but it was never materialized, and he joined Universal Television, where he stayed for the next 12 years in order to produce television shows. In 1977, he quit Universal and set up the company independently, with a distribution agreement with Worldvision Enterprises and an office at Samuel Goldwyn Studios.

The estate of Jack Webb now owns the full rights to the company's library, with the exception of the original 1954 feature film version of Dragnet (originally released by Warner Bros., but now owned by Universal Pictures), and the films Pete Kelly's Blues and The D.I. (which are controlled by original distributor Warner Bros.).

However, Webb's three seminal series, Dragnet (the 1967–1970 incarnation), Adam-12, and Emergency!, are now available on DVD from either Universal or Shout! Factory, the first two under license from the Webb estate, the latter in-house since Universal was reassigned the Emergency! series copyright. The MeTV and Cozi TV Television Networks also air episodes of the Mark VII Limited shows.

== Programs produced by Mark VII ==
All series aired on NBC except as noted.

- Dragnet, 1951–1959
- Noah's Ark, 1956–1957
- The D.A.'s Man, 1959
- Pete Kelly's Blues, 1959
- GE True, 1962–1963 (CBS)
- Temple Houston, 1963–1964
- Dragnet, 1967–1970
- Adam-12, 1968–1975
- The D.A., 1971–1972
- O'Hara, U.S. Treasury, 1971–1972 (CBS)
- Emergency!, 1972–1977
- Hec Ramsey, 1972–1974
- Escape, 1973
- Emergency +4, 1973–1974
- Chase, 1973–1974
- Sierra, 1974
- Mobile One, 1975 (ABC)
- Little Mo, 1978 TV movie
- Project U.F.O., 1978–1979
- Sam, 1978 (CBS)

Mark VII's final production was The 25th Man, an unsold television pilot that aired on NBC in 1982.

== Production logo ==
The hand holding the stamp belongs to Harold C. Nyby, Jack Webb's construction foreman. (The logo is a moving image with sound, of which a still is displayed here.)

Mark VII Limited was known for its production logo attached to the end of its productions. The logo, in use in one form or another for much of the company's existence, showed the hands of Jack Webb's construction foreman Harold C. Nyby holding a stamp against a sheet of metal. As a timpani roll played, he struck two blows on the stamp with a hammer and then removed both tools to reveal the Roman numeral VII indented into the sheet.

The origin of the name "Mark VII" is unclear. One source said the name meant nothing, and that it was made up over coffee one day. Another source says Webb just liked the look of the Roman numerals.

The Mark VII production logo is one of the more recognizable logos of its time and has become iconic, with many instances of filmmakers and production companies paying homage to it in various ways, most notably Williams Street Productions, originally Ghost Planet Industries, of Adult Swim/Cartoon Network programming, whose logo utilizes the same drumroll/hammer clinks soundtrack from the 1967 Mark VII logo. The Mark VII Limited logo was also spoofed at the end of the 1954 Woody Woodpecker cartoon Under The Counter Spy. In this spoof, the man accidentally hits his thumb with the hammer and yells "OUCH!", then pulls the hammer away to reveal the ending title card. The man's voice was supplied by Daws Butler. A 1955 The Three Stooges short Blunder Boys not only was a parody of Dragnet, but ended with Larry being stamped with "VII 1/2 The End" on his forehead. Gunther-Wahl Productions used a similar card at the end of its cartoons.

The logo was remade multiple times during the company's history. It is reported that the early logos featured Jack Webb's hands but the later logos featured Ivan Martin's. Martin was the director of studio operations for 20th Century Fox at the time of his retirement but worked in the studio's visual effects department during production of the logos.

In an episode of The Dick Van Dyke Show, Rob Petrie references the "Mark VII Limited" logo to a police officer when referencing the end of a case where his living room couch had been stolen.

Filmmaker Spike Lee pays homage to the logo in the logo for his own production company 40 Acres and a Mule Filmworks.

In addition, the sound of the hammer striking the stamp was used in the intro to the WWE entrance music of wrestler Greg Valentine.
