= O'Hara, U.S. Treasury =

American crime drama television series (1971–1972)

- Genre: Crime drama
- Created by: James E. Moser; Jack Webb
- Written by: Fletcher Beaumont; Richard Carlson; James Doherty; Jackson Gillis; Herman Groves; Robert I. Holt; William P. McGivern; Dick Morgan; James E. Moser; Tony Patino; Herb Purdum; Gilbert Ralston; Bill Rega; Hank Searls; Jack Turley; Dan Ullman; David H. Vowell
- Directed by: Alan Crosland, Jr. Lawrence Dobkin; Paul Krasny; Paul Landres; Gerald Mayer; Dick Moder; James Neilson; Allen Reisner; Ron Winston
- Starring: David Janssen
- Theme music composer: Ray Heindorf; William Lava
- Composers: Fred Steiner; William Lava; Sidney Fine; Dave Brubeck
- Country of origin: United States
- Original language: English
- No. of seasons: 1
- No. of episodes: 22 + pilot

Production
- Executive producer: Jack Webb
- Producer: Leonard B. Kaufman
- Cinematography: Fred Mandl
- Running time: 60 minutes
- Production companies: Mark VII Limited; David Janssen Enterprises Inc. Universal Television

Original release
- Network: CBS
- Release: September 17, 1971 – March 10, 1972

O'Hara, U.S. Treasury (titled onscreen as O'Hara, United States Treasury) is an American crime drama television series starring David Janssen and broadcast by CBS during the 1971–72 television season. Jack Webb's Mark VII Limited packaged the program for Universal Television. Webb and longtime colleague James E. Moser created the show; Leonard B. Kaufman was the producer. The series was produced with the full approval and cooperation of the United States Department of the Treasury.

== Synopsis ==
O'Hara, U.S. Treasury starred Janssen, whose company co-produced the show with Mark VII, as the title character, Treasury Agent Jim O'Hara. A county sheriff from Nebraska whose wife and child died in a fire, O'Hara cut all ties with his past life. He takes the Treasury Enforcement Agent exam and puts in an application with the United States Department of the Treasury, Secret Service. He is offered a position as a Special Agent with the Customs Service. He accepts the offer. He is assigned to a Customs office on the U.S.-Mexico border. His first case requires him to go undercover to break up a large narcotics smuggling organization. His abilities as an undercover agent become apparent to his bosses.

As a "T-Man," O'Hara was available to any of the various law enforcement agencies then part of the Department, all of which cooperated in this positive portrayal of their various organizations, much in the manner of the Los Angeles Police Department with Webb's Dragnet and Adam-12. These included the Secret Service, the Intelligence Unit of the Internal Revenue Service, the then-Alcohol, Tobacco, and Firearms Division of IRS, and the then-Customs Bureau.

O'Hara sometimes worked undercover. Janssen was the series' only regular, as he was given a different assignment at the start of each weekly episode.

Guest stars in the series' brief run included Bruce Bennett, Godfrey Cambridge, Paul Comi, William Conrad, Yvonne Craig, Gary Crosby, James Doohan, Will Geer, Frank Gorshin, Alan Hale Jr., Martha Hyer, Marilyn Maxwell, Ricardo Montalbán, Judy Pace, Leslie Parrish, Larry Pennell, Brock Peters, Charles Knox Robinson, Marion Ross, Don Stroud, George Takei, Jessica Tandy, Angel Tompkins, Lindsay Wagner, Betty White, Joseph Wiseman, Lana Wood, and Dana Wynter.

O'Hara marked the first Mark VII show to run a full hour in length; all of Webb's previous efforts (excepting the TV-movie pilot for Dragnet 1967) ran in half-hour episodes. It was also one of the few he did not package for NBC. The show failed to compete in the Nielsen ratings against ABC's The Partridge Family and Room 222 and ended after one season, ranking 48th out of 78 shows with an average 17.1 rating. Reruns were later shown on the A&E Network in the 1990s and on Retro Television Network in the 2000s.

According to Brandon Tartikoff, when Fred Silverman was the head of programming at CBS and considering whether or not to renew O'Hara, he met with a representative of the Treasury Department, who told him, "There are those of us down in Washington who like the idea of a weekly prime-time showcase. So if the show gets cancelled, we're gonna do what we've gotta do." Silverman didn't take the Treasury representative seriously, but according to Tartikoff, after the show was cancelled, "about a dozen top CBS executives on both coasts had their income taxes audited the following year."

== Episodes ==
No.	Title	Directed by	Written by	Original release date
0	"Operation: Cobra"	Jack Webb	James E. Moser	April 2, 1971
1	"Operation: Big Store"	Gerald Mayer	Story by : Gilbert Ralston; Teleplay by : Gilbert Ralston & Robert I. Holt	September 17, 1971
2	"Operation: Bandera"	Allen Reisner	William P. McGivern	September 24, 1971
3	"Operation: Wastepaper world"	Sam Freedle	Fletcher Beaumont	October 1, 1971
4	"Operation: Bribery"	Allen Reisner	Robert I. Holt	October 8, 1971
5	"Operation: Time-Fuse"	Lawrence Dobkin	William P. McGivern	October 15, 1971
6	"Operation: Offset"	Richard Moder	Hank Searls & Richard Carlson	October 22, 1971
7	"Operation: Heroin"	James Neilson	David H. Vowell	October 29, 1971
8	"Operation: Spread"	Alan Crosland, Jr.	Richard Carlson	November 5, 1971
9	"Operation: Deadhead"	Paul Krasny	Jack Turley	November 12, 1971
10	"Operation: Hijack"	Sam Freedle	Herman Groves	November 26, 1971
11	"Operation: Crystal Springs"	Alan Crosland, Jr.	Gilbert Ralston	December 3, 1971
12	"Operation: Payoff"	Daniel Haller	Herb Purdum	December 10, 1971
13	"Operation: Moonshine"	Paul Landres	James Moser & Robert I. Holt	December 17, 1971
14	"Operation: XW-1"	Ron Winston	William P. McGivern	January 7, 1972
15	"Operation: Lady Luck"	Sam Freedle	Bill Rega	January 14, 1972
16	"Operation: Deathwatch"	James Neilson	Jackson Gillis & Robert I. Holt	January 21, 1972
17	"Operation: White Fire"	Alan Crosland, Jr.	David H. Vowell	January 28, 1972
18	"Operation: Dorais"	Lawrence Dobkin	Richard Carlson	February 4, 1972
19	"Operation: Rake-Off"	Sam Freedle	James Doherty	February 11, 1972
20	"Operation: Mr. Felix"	Alan Crosland, Jr.	Tony Patino	February 18, 1972
21	"Operation: Good Citizen"	Dick Moder	Dick Morgan	March 3, 1972
22	"Operation: Smoke Screen"	James Neilson	Dan Ullman	March 10, 1972

== Award nomination ==
Year	Award	Result	Category
1972	Golden Globe Awards	Nominated	Best TV Show - Drama
