= List of McMillan & Wife episodes =

This is a list of episodes for the television series McMillan & Wife. For the sixth season, the "Wife" was killed off and the title was shortened to McMillan. The pilot episode was 120 minutes, seasons 1 and 2 were 90-minute episodes, season 3 had both 90- and 120-minute episodes, seasons 4 and 5 were 120-minute episodes, and season 6 had 90-minute episodes.

All six seasons of this series have been released on DVD.

== Series overview ==
Season	Episodes	Originally released	
Season	Episodes	First released	Last released
1	8	September 17, 1971	March 1, 1972
2	7	September 24, 1972	April 1, 1973
3	6	September 30, 1973	February 17, 1974
4	6	September 29, 1974	March 16, 1975
5	7	September 28, 1975	March 7, 1976
6	6	December 5, 1976	April 24, 1977

== Episodes ==
=== Season 1 (1971–72) ===
No. overall	No. in season	Title	Directed by	Written by	Original release date
1	1	"Once Upon a Dead Man"	Leonard Stern	Leonard Stern & Chester Krumholz	September 17, 1971
Series pilot: The wife (Susan Saint James) of a San Francisco police commissioner (Rock Hudson) drags him into a charity auction theft, which leads to a murder. Guest star: Jack Albertson. The pilot was a 120-minute episode. When the series started, the episodes were 90 minutes long including commercial breaks.
2	2	"Murder by the Barrel"	John Astin	Oliver Hailey	September 29, 1971
During the move into the McMillans' new house, Sally is terrified to discover a dead body in one of the barrels delivered by the movers. She calls Mac, but when he and Sgt. Enright arrive, the body is gone. As Sally tries to prove that she didn't imagine it, Mac and Enright investigate the moving company and discover that several people have lost items and have also reported missing persons on the same day. The McMillans' domestic problems continue when an intruder attacks Sally and the unconscious body of a presumed-dead mobster is discovered in their basement. Guest star: Kenneth Mars. First episode with Mildred (Nancy Walker).
3	3	"The Easy Sunday Murder Case"	Barry Shear	Burt Prelutsky	October 20, 1971
After a Saturday breakfast with Sally's mother, a wealthy woman's dog is taken for ransom. And they kidnapped her husband, too. Guest stars: June Havoc, Wally Cox.
4	4	"Husbands, Wives and Killers"	Daniel Petrie	Leonard Stern & Robert Lewin	November 10, 1971
Mac and Sally are entrusted with protection of a valuable necklace. This episode, in which part of the action is at a costume ball, features Rock Hudson in a bunny costume. Guest star: Tyne Daly.
5	5	"Death Is a Seven Point Favorite"	John Astin	Robert Lewin, S.L. Bernard & Adam Edwards	December 8, 1971
Mac and Sally come to the aid of football star Billy Benton, after an attempt is made on his life. Guest star: Don Stroud.
6	6	"The Face of Murder"	Hy Averback	Oliver Hailey	January 5, 1972
Sally becomes the prey of a jewel thief out to dispose of witnesses. Guest star: Claude Akins.
7	7	"'Till Death Do Us Part"	Robert Michael Lewis	Oliver Hailey	February 16, 1972
When Mac investigates a psychotic killer who targets socially prominent people, the killer turns his attention to Mac and Sally by drugging their drinks. He then has a pest-exterminating company enclose the entire McMillan house in a huge airproof and soundproof bag and pump poison gas inside. Guest star: Lawrence Pressman. Mildred doesn't appear in the episode.
8	8	"An Elementary Case of Murder"	Robert Michael Lewis	Paul Mason & Brad Radnitz	March 1, 1972
An old flame of Mac's comes to him for help. Her abusive manager and his girlfriend wind up dead, and she asks for Mac's help. Guest star: Barbara McNair.

=== Season 2 (1972–73) ===
No. overall	No. in season	Title	Directed by	Written by	Original release date
9	1	"Night of the Wizard"	Robert Michael Lewis	Steve Fisher	September 24, 1972
A man is done in by his wife, but he's not done yet. Evidently his ghost is not quiet. Guest star: Eileen Brennan.
10	2	"Blues for Sally M."	Robert Michael Lewis	Oliver Hailey & Alfred Brenner	October 22, 1972
Buzz Simms, a concert pianist of great promise and a friend of Sally's, is nearly strangled in his apartment. Guest stars: Keir Dullea, Edie Adams.
11	3	"Cop of the Year"	Robert Michael Lewis	Paul Mason, Edward D. Hoch & Oliver Hailey	November 19, 1972
Sgt. Enright receives a medal as "Cop of the Year," and then he is set up for murdering his ex-wife. The frame is beautiful, and the real mystery is how (and why) it was done. Guest star: Edmond O'Brien.
12	4	"Terror Times Two"	Ron Winston	Gloria Goldsmith	December 13, 1972
It's The Comedy of Errors when the mob abducts Mac and replaces him with Claudio Manton, a surgically altered lookalike to liquidate a squealer in a tightly guarded secret location. Meanwhile, Enright grows suspicious of the lookalike's behavior and starts investigating while the real Mac is gagged and tied up. Guest star: Andrew Duggan. The idea of the two Macs was used again in episode 21, "Cross & Double Cross."
13	5	"No Hearts, No Flowers"	Gary Nelson	Steve Fisher	January 14, 1973
Sally's next on a maniac's agenda; a psychiatrist assists. Guest star: Sheree North.
14	6	"The Fine Art of Staying Alive"	Edward M. Abroms	Ted Leighton, Paul Mason & Oliver Hailey	March 11, 1973
Sally is kidnapped at an art gallery. The ransom is a Rembrandt painting, and she gives Mac clues which lead back to where they got engaged. Guest stars: Henry Jones, Alan Hale, Jr.
15	7	"Two Dollars on Trouble to Win"	Gary Nelson	Burt Prelutsky & Leonard Stern	April 1, 1973
Strange accidents around a thoroughbred stable suggest the owner, an old friend of Mac and Sally, is a target. Guest star: William Demarest.

=== Season 3 (1973–74) ===
No. overall	No. in season	Title	Directed by	Written by	Original release date
16	1	"Death of a Monster...Birth of a Legend"	Daniel Petrie	Gordon Cotler & Don M. Mankiewicz	September 30, 1973
The McMillans are vacation-bound to Scotland at Mac's ancestral home. He has just discovered the murdered body of his beloved uncle and his vacation turns into a whodunit. Guest star: Roddy McDowall.
17	2	"The Devil, You Say"	Alex March	Steve Fisher	October 21, 1973
Mildred thinks she's witnessed a murder, and Sally receives a strange gift in the mail: film of a satanic ritual. More gifts reveal someone has it in for Mildred and a yen for Sally. Guest stars: Keenan Wynn, Werner Klemperer.
18	3	"Freefall to Terror"	Alf Kjellin	Oliver Hailey & Edward D. Hoch	November 11, 1973
In this bizarre case, Mac's former law partner takes a suicide leap from a skyscraper window and his body never reaches the ground. Guest stars: Barbara Feldon, Tom Bosley.
19	4	"The Man Without a Face"	Lee H. Katzin	Paul Mason, Gordon Cotler & Don M. Mankiewicz	January 6, 1974
A traitorous double agent known only as Venice has killed an old friend from Mac's CIA days; Venice is a master of disguise, and Mac has never seen his real face. Guest star: Steve Forrest, Dana Wynter. One of two 120-minute episodes in season 3.
20	5	"Reunion in Terror"	Mel Ferber	Oliver Hailey & Henry Slesar	January 27, 1974
Mac's old college football team's reunion is coming up, but a killer is eliminating the team, one by one. Guest stars: Buddy Hackett, Roosevelt Grier.
21	6	"Cross & Double Cross"	Alex March	Paul Mason & Oliver Hailey	February 17, 1974
Mac switches places with Claudio Manton, a hood with a striking resemblance to him, to intercept stolen gold trans-shipped from France via Portugal and Mexico. Guest stars: Rhonda Fleming, Dabney Coleman. One of two 120-minute episodes in season 3.

=== Season 4 (1974–75) ===
Series moves to 120-minute episodes.

No. overall	No. in season	Title	Directed by	Written by	Original release date
22	1	"Downshift to Danger"	Lou Antonio	Peter S. Fischer	September 29, 1974
The grand prize of the 20th Annual Golden State Rally in Monterey is an antique car collection willed by Max, the late eccentric millionaire. Mischief develops into mishaps and worse, until an entrant is killed. Guest stars: Van Johnson, Alex Karras.
23	2	"The Game of Survival"	Harry Falk	William Driskill	October 20, 1974
A temperamental tennis champion is suspected of murdering a newspaper magnate who had him suspended. Bobby Riggs appears as himself. Guest stars: Stefanie Powers, George Maharis.
24	3	"Buried Alive"	James Sheldon	Howard Berk	November 10, 1974
A World War II intelligence colleague, long since thought to be dead, turns up and is murdered. Guest stars: Barry Sullivan, Donna Mills.
25	4	"Guilt by Association"	Harry Falk	Steven Bochco	December 8, 1974
Mildred is accosted while serving on a sequestered jury, then another juror is murdered in his locked room. Guest stars: Susan Strasberg, David Soul.
26	5	"Night Train to L.A."	Leonard Horn	David P. Lewis, Booker Bradshaw & Richard Danus	January 19, 1975
With a very pregnant Sally at home, Mac heads south to a police convention on a train filled with officers, Mildred, and the author of Cops and Other Crooks, who is murdered en route. Guest star: Linda Evans.
27	6	"Love, Honor and Swindle"	Lou Antonio	Peter S. Fischer	February 16, 1975
Mac's sister Megan seems to be engaged to a confidence man out to swindle a mining company. Guest stars: Gretchen Corbett, David Birney. First episode after the baby is born.

=== Season 5 (1975–76) ===
No. overall	No. in season	Title	Directed by	Written by	Original release date
28	1	"The Deadly Inheritance"	Lou Antonio	Peter S. Fischer	September 28, 1975
Mac's eccentric mother insists on helping the police as they search for the man who tried to murder her friend and who is trying to murder her now. Guest stars: Jack Gilford, Mildred Natwick.
29	2	"Requiem for a Bride"	E.W. Swackhamer	Howard Berk	October 26, 1975
Commissioner McMillan celebrates an old friend's wedding, but the honeymoon ends when the bride is murdered. Guest stars: Susan Sullivan, Henry Darrow, Lynn Borden, Lew Ayres.
30	3	"Aftershock"	Harry Falk	Richard Bluel & Pat Fielder	November 9, 1975
Unusual interest is shown in the McMillans' house when Sally thinks of selling it. Then an earthquake reveals a body behind the brickwork. Guest stars: Julie Newmar, Robert Loggia, Richard Dawson.
31	4	"Secrets for Sale"	Bob Finkel	Bill Driskill	December 7, 1975
During an election, the city is beset by a fiscal crisis. Politicians are being blackmailed, and Sgt. Enright leaves the force to marry an heiress and work for a private detective agency. Guest stars: Meredith Baxter, John Vernon.
32	5	"The Deadly Cure"	James Sheldon	Richard Danus	January 18, 1976
Mac is wounded in a failed drug raid and sent to the hospital, where he sees a patient smothered, and slowly unravels the case. Guest stars: Lola Albright, Dick Sargent.
33	6	"Greed"	Bob Finkel	Virginia Aldridge	February 15, 1976
Mildred and Agatha (Martha Raye) are named in a will. Heirs start dying, and next to inherit is Agatha, whose investigation runs parallel to McMillan's. Guest stars: Slim Pickens, Tab Hunter.
34	7	"Point of Law"	Lou Antonio	Howard Berk	March 7, 1976
A naval lieutenant facing a court-martial on a murder charge is appointed counsel in the person of Commander McMillan, USNR. This was the last official episode of McMillan & Wife. Guest stars: William Daniels, Susan Anspach. Last appearance of Sally and Mildred.

=== Season 6 (1976–77) ===
Series returns to 90-minute episodes and retitled McMillan.

No. overall	No. in season	Title	Directed by	Written by	Original release date
35	1	"All Bets Off"	Jackie Cooper	Robert Swanson	December 5, 1976
Mac, now a widower, falls for a tennis pro whose stepson is being held ransom for a valuable diamond necklace on a vacation in Las Vegas. This is the first of six "girlfriend-of-the-week" episodes, which characterized Season 6. Guest star: Jessica Walter. First appearance of Sergeant Steve DiMaggio (Richard Gilliland).
36	2	"Dark Sunrise"	Bob Finkel	Jerry McNeely	January 2, 1977
Mac returns from a fishing trip to find himself presumed dead, apparent victim of an assassination plot. Guest stars: Karen Valentine, Kim Basinger.
37	3	"Philip's Game"	Lou Antonio	Don M. Mankiewicz, Gordon Cotler & Leonard Stern	January 23, 1977
McMillan is wined and dined by an elegant hit man (Tony Roberts) who commits murder in imaginative ways. Guest star: Shirley Jones.
38	4	"Coffee, Tea, or Cyanide?"	James Sheldon	Richard Bluel, Pat Fielder & Steven Bochco	January 30, 1977
While Mac takes a flight to Hawaii, a passenger is poisoned — and then the poisoner is stabbed. Guest star: Julie Sommars.
39	5	"Affair of the Heart"	Jackie Cooper	Steven Bochco	March 20, 1977
Mac's dentist finds a local TV-news anchorman, his wife's lover, dead from a heart attack. Frantic, he tries to make it look like the man had died in a car crash, but it turns out he had been poisoned. Guest stars: Stefanie Powers, Larry Hagman, Barbara Babcock. This is the only episode in which the character Charles Enright doesn't appear.
40	6	"Have You Heard About Vanessa?"	James Sheldon	Leonard Kantor	April 24, 1977
Vanessa Vale, a glamor model, apparently jumps from the balcony of her 15th-story apartment to her death. But Mac investigates and finds signs of a struggle — she was pushed off. Then it turns out that she wasn't really Vanessa. Guest stars: Joan Van Ark. Joanna Cameron, Martha Raye, Trisha Noble, Natalie Schafer.

== See also ==
List of The NBC Mystery Movie episodes
