= Crucible of Empire =

1999 television documentary film

- Also known as: Crucible of Empire: The Spanish–American War
- Genre: Documentary
- Written by: Daniel A. Miller; Daniel B. Polin
- Directed by: Daniel A. Miller
- Voices of: Larry Linville; Laurence Luckinbill; Lou Diamond Phillips; Shawn Elliot; Jeff DeMunn; Roger Pretto
- Narrated by: Edward James Olmos
- Music by: T. O. Sterrett
- Country of origin: United States
- Original language: English

Production
- Producers: Daniel A. Miller; Daniel B. Polin
- Cinematography: Roger T. Grange III
- Editor: Ted Winterburn
- Running time: 120 minutes
- Production companies: Great Projects Film Company; South Carolina ETV

Original release
- Network: PBS
- Release: August 23, 1999

Crucible of Empire: The Spanish–American War is a 1999 television documentary film about the Spanish–American War and American imperialism at the turn of the 20th century. Produced by the Great Projects Film Company and South Carolina ETV for PBS, it details how the United States' imperial ambitions largely grew out of its war with the Spanish Empire and was the harbinger for the American Century. Directed by Daniel A. Miller, written and produced by Miller and Daniel B. Polin, and narrated by Edward James Olmos, the film first aired on PBS in the United States on August 23, 1999.

== Voice cast ==
- Edward James Olmos as the narrator
- Larry Linville as Theodore Roosevelt
- Laurence Luckinbill as William McKinley
- Lou Diamond Phillips as Emilio Aguinaldo
- Shawn Elliot as Máximo Gómez
- Jeff DeMunn as Richard Harding Davis
- Roger Pretto as Calixto García

== Interviewees ==
- Stephen Ambrose, historian
- Robert L. Beisner, author of Twelve Against Empire
- H.W. Brands, historian
- Douglas Brinkley, historian
- Maria Luisa T. Camagay, historian
- Ada Ferrer, historian
- John Gable, biographer of Theodore Roosevelt
- Kevin K. Gaines, historian
- Kristin L. Hoganson, gender historian
- Ricardo T. Jose, military historian
- Franklin W. Knight, Caribbean historian
- Walter LaFeber, historian
- Joyce Milton, author of The Yellow Kids
- David Nasaw, biographer of William Randolph Hearst
- G. J. A. O'Toole, historian
- Louis A. Perez Jr., Cuban historian
- Cesar Aguinaldo Virata, grand-nephew of Emilio Aguinaldo and former Philippine Prime Minister

== Critical response ==
Walter Goodman of The New York Times stated that the Spanish–American War "receives colorful treatment tonight [in Crucible of Empire], enlivened with period flavor, political contradictions and populist enthusiasms."

== Home media ==
Crucible of War was first released on VHS by PBS Home Video (distributed by Warner Home Video) on November 2, 1999. PBS later released the film on DVD by October 16, 2007.
