= The Men (TV series) =

- Title card
- Starring: Robert Conrad; James Wainwright; Laurence Luckinbill
- Theme music composer: Isaac Hayes
- Country of origin: United States
- No. of episodes: 3

Original release
- Network: ABC
- Release: 1972 – 1973

The Men was an umbrella title for three crime/adventure dramas aired in the United States by ABC as part of its 1972-73 lineup.

The Men comprised Assignment Vienna, Jigsaw, and The Delphi Bureau. The common element in each of those hour-long series was that its hero was a rugged individualist, working essentially alone with little or no supervision on matters of vital significance. The series' stars, respectively, were Robert Conrad, James Wainwright, and Laurence Luckinbill. The program originally aired on Thursday nights, with each element appearing in a regular rotation, every third week. But when The Men was moved to Saturday nights, in January 1973, the elements began to be aired with several episodes of the same one appearing in consecutive weeks.

Unlike the similar NBC Mystery Movie wheel, the elements of The Men all came from different TV studios—Assignment Vienna, Jigsaw, and The Delphi Bureau were respectively produced by Metro-Goldwyn-Mayer Television, Universal Television (the same studio behind the Mystery Movie), and Warner Bros. Television.

While the series was a failure in the Nielsen TV ratings, its theme song—composed and recorded by Isaac Hayes—was a minor R&B hit. (A disco version of that theme was recorded by Joe Bataan in 1976 and a smooth jazz version was recorded by Gerald Albright in 2008.)
