= Escape (1973 TV series) =

- Genre: Anthology
- Created by: Jack Webb
- Directed by: Wyllis Cooper
- Narrated by: Jack Webb
- Theme music composer: Frank Comstock
- Composer: Frank Comstock
- Country of origin: United States
- Original language: English
- No. of seasons: 1
- No. of episodes: 4

Production
- Executive producer: Robert A. Cinader
- Producer: Jerome H. Stanley
- Camera setup: Single-camera
- Running time: 24 mins.
- Production companies: Mark VII Limited; Universal Television

Original release
- Network: NBC
- Release: February 11 – April 1, 1973

Escape is an American anthology series that aired on the NBC network from February 11 to April 1, 1973. The show was a production of Jack Webb's Mark VII Limited for Universal Television. It aired on Sunday evenings at 10 p.m. Eastern, following the NBC Mystery Movie.

== Synopsis ==
Webb, best known for portraying Joe Friday on the long-running Dragnet, narrated this half-hour anthology series about people who found themselves in dangerous situations and who had to muster enough ingenuity and rely upon luck to save themselves from otherwise certain death. Like several of the other shows Webb packaged through the years, the format was that of a semi-documentary, with the narration punctuating the scenes.

Intended as a trial run for a permanent slot during the 1973–74 season, the show did not do well in the ratings and ended after only four episodes. Reruns were broadcast that summer.

== Episodes ==
No.	Title	Original release date
1	"Hold Down" "The Sub"	February 11, 1973
2	"Render Safe"	February 18, 1973
3	"The Wilderness"	March 25, 1973
4	"Walk South"	April 1, 1973
