= McCloud (TV series) =

American police drama television series (1970–1977)

- Genre: Crime drama; Mystery
- Created by: Herman Miller
- Starring: Dennis Weaver; J. D. Cannon; Terry Carter; Ken Lynch; Diana Muldaur
- Composers: David Shire; Stu Phillips; Frank De Vol
- Country of origin: United States
- Original language: English
- No. of seasons: 7
- No. of episodes: 45 (+1 TV movie) (list of episodes)

Production
- Executive producers: Glen A. Larson; Leslie Stevens
- Cinematography: John M. Stephens; Ben Colman; Sol Negrin
- Running time: 120 min. (20 episodes); 90 min. (19 episodes); 60 min. (6 episodes)
- Production company: Universal Television

Original release
- Network: NBC
- Release: September 16, 1970 – April 17, 1977

McCloud is an American police drama television series created by Herman Miller, that aired on NBC from September 16, 1970, to April 17, 1977. The series starred Dennis Weaver, and for six of its seven years as part of the NBC Mystery Movie rotating wheel series that was produced for the network by Universal Television. The show was centered on Deputy Marshal Sam McCloud of the small western town of Taos, New Mexico, who was on loan to the New York City Police Department (NYCPD) as a special investigator.

== History ==
The first choice for the role of McCloud was Fess Parker, who turned it down. Universal hired Dennis Weaver, who was well known as a western genre actor from his role on the TV version of Gunsmoke. The pilot, "Portrait of a Dead Girl", aired on February 17, 1970, and established the premise by having McCloud escort a prisoner from New Mexico to New York City, only to become embroiled in solving a complicated murder case.

This premise of "a cowboy in the big city" was adapted from the 1968 Don Siegel film Coogan's Bluff, starring Clint Eastwood. Herman Miller, who was responsible for the story of Coogan's Bluff and co-wrote the screenplay with Dean Riesner and Howard Rodman, is credited as the creator of McCloud. Coogan's Bluff reflects Richard Thorpe's 1942 film Tarzan's New York Adventure and the latter-day career of Bat Masterson. (Siegel appeared in the "Return to the Alamo" episode as "2nd Desk Sergeant"). Like Coogan, McCloud galloped the length and breadth of Manhattan (he was joined by a mounted unit in "The 42nd Street Cavalry"), and the sight of McCloud on horseback riding down the middle of a busy traffic choked city street flanked by tall skyscrapers (taken from an early episode) became one of the series' most famous images.

NBC picked up the show for six 60-minute episodes in September and October 1970, placing it in the rotation of its original wheel series Four in One along with San Francisco International Airport, The Psychiatrist and Rod Serling's Night Gallery. The following fall, the network commissioned a new wheel series and lengthened McCloud from sixty to ninety minutes. NBC ordered two new series, McMillan & Wife and Columbo, to fill the wheel and all three became part of the newly named NBC Mystery Movie series, which aired on Wednesday nights. The series, with a distinctive opening musical theme composed by Henry Mancini over a video collage of the various series became a hit, finishing at number 14 in the Nielsen ratings for that 1971–1972 season. NBC then decided to try another competitive move and relocated McCloud, along with McMillan and Columbo, to Sunday nights for the following Fall 1972. The Mystery Movie series was an even bigger draw on Sundays, finishing at number 5 in the ratings for the season.

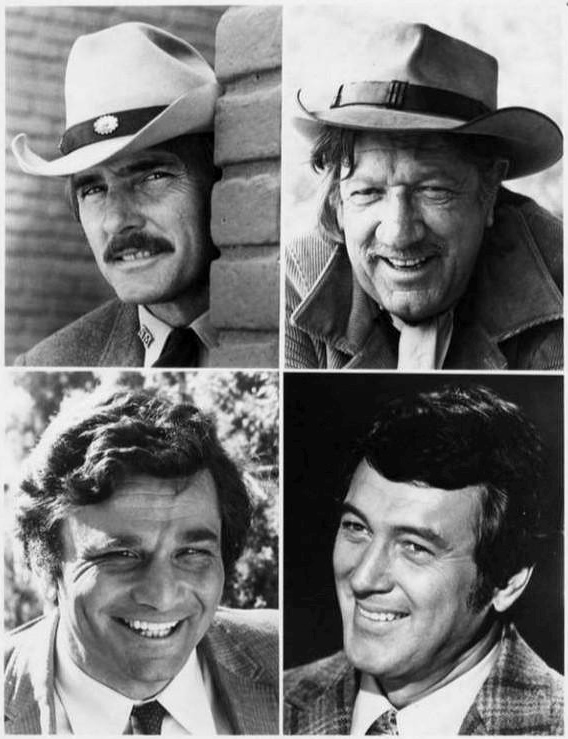
The NBC Sunday Mystery Movie program worked on a rotating basis – one per month from each of its shows. Top left: Dennis Weaver in McCloud. Top right: Richard Boone in Hec Ramsey. Bottom left: Peter Falk in Columbo. Bottom right: Rock Hudson in McMillan & Wife.

Starting in the fifth season in September 1974, most episodes were two hours long, but were dropped again to 90 minutes for the seventh and final season starting in the October 1976. Episodes 5 and 9 of season 5 were 90 minutes. The 46th, and last, episode, "McCloud Meets Dracula", was aired on April 17, 1977.

Weaver received Emmy nominations in 1974 and 1975 for Outstanding Lead Actor in a Limited Series.

The executive producer was Glen A. Larson, who also wrote for the series, as did Peter Allan Fields, Lou Shaw, Jimmy Sangster, and others. Larson won an Edgar Award for "The New Mexican Connection".

== Recurring themes and characters ==
=== The Westerner in New York City ===
The most enduring theme of the show was the conflict between the good-natured, clear-eyed buoyancy of McCloud and the metropolitan cynicism of the residents—including his fellow officers—of New York City. McCloud's attire, typically consisting of a sheepskin coat or Western jacket, bolo tie, cowboy hat, and boots, provided implied comic relief in many encounters with New Yorkers. That New Yorkers might mistake him for a rube because of his appearance occasionally worked to his advantage. He would often allay suspicion of his motives by insisting he was in New York "to observe and learn". Under his jacket or coat, he usually wore a khaki uniform shirt with a brown star-shaped uniform patch with gold trim on the left sleeve, lettered "Marshal's Office Taos, N.M." There was a yellow circle in the center with the number 33. He wore two collar pins; one was "NM" and the other was "33". McCloud carried a blued .45 Colt SAA Western-style six-shooter with a 4¾" barrel.

The signature of McCloud's character was his Western unflappability and seeming inability to recognize an insult, especially from his NYPD superior, Chief of Detectives Peter B. Clifford, whose jibes ("send in the sagebrush Sherlock Holmes") he never would take personally. Weaver's grin and drawling twang cast McCloud as the embodiment of the American law officer who always sees the good in people, knows the real stakes, and spares no pain in catching the bad guy. The character's signature catchphrase was "There ya go!", which was often met with bemusement or puzzlement by the listener. (One exception was a character played by John Denver; at the end of the show they traded catchphrases, Denver responding "There ya go!" to McCloud's "Far out!")

=== Antagonism with Chief Clifford ===
Another recurring theme in the show was the conflict between McCloud and Chief Clifford, who was played in every episode but the pilot by J. D. Cannon. In the first episodes, their relationship was portrayed as somewhat amiable, with Clifford showing a wary respect for the unconventional Westerner assigned to his command. The relationship quickly soured based mostly on McCloud's seeming disregard of authority combined with a charm that let him escape many of the consequences of his cowboy-like determination. Clifford's attitude to McCloud became one of cynical antagonism, bordering at times on extreme rage, but usually tempered with a grudging respect for McCloud's ability to solve the most difficult of cases. McCloud frequently interrupts a dressing-down from Clifford by saying "I 'preciate yer confidence, Chief!"

=== Friendship with Sgt. Broadhurst ===
In many episodes, McCloud was partnered with Sgt. Joe Broadhurst, played by Terry Carter. Broadhurst, a New Yorker, was portrayed with a certain existential pessimism to counter McCloud's high spirits. Like Chief Clifford, Broadhurst felt himself wise to McCloud's peculiarities, but was without the anger, and usually wound up resigned to being drawn into McCloud's schemes to solve particular cases, sometimes against direct orders. He would then sometimes play the role of voluntary lightning rod for Clifford's anger, and absorb as much of the blame for McCloud's initiative as McCloud himself. (Broadhurst served as acting Chief of Detectives three times during Clifford's absence, in "This Must Be the Alamo", "Return to the Alamo" and "'Twas the Fight Before Christmas...".)

=== Other characters ===
Other recurring characters on the show included the gravel-voiced Sgt. Grover, played by Ken Lynch, who seemed to be forever at his desk in the squad room. The ever-smiling but somewhat batty Sgt. Phyllis Norton was played by Teri Garr.

=== Love interests ===
McCloud was portrayed as something of a ladies' man, and the characters played by the frequent female guest stars would often fall for his protective charm. Chris Coughlin, played by frequent guest star Diana Muldaur, was McCloud's off-and-on lover throughout the course of the series. Chris was a journalist whose duties as newspaper writer ("never a reporter") sometimes came into conflict with McCloud's police work.

== Portrayal of New York City in the 1970s ==
The show, which was in some sense a big city western, was set in New York City during what was arguably NYC's lowest point in the late 20th century, a period following the troubled 1960s and leading up to the fiscal crisis of 1975 (which figured, for example, in the episode "The Day New York Turned Blue"). The title card of the early seasons of the show prominently showed the Twin Towers of the World Trade Center still under construction, which at the time was a highly controversial urban regeneration project in the city.

At the time, the city seemed to be on an inexorable downward slide into chaos, a theme that was explored in a more brutal fashion in movies such as William Friedkin's film The French Connection, which was released in 1971, the year after the pilot of McCloud, and Michael Winner's 1974 urban thriller Death Wish. In some episodes (such as "Walk in the Dark") the city was portrayed as particularly crime-ridden with the danger of muggings and bodily harm at every turn. Such lurking evil was often more in the dialogue than the pictures, however, and the show retained a somewhat whimsical and sunny flavor despite the subject matter.

McCloud was filmed partially on location (the unit was in New York for "A Little Plot at Tranquil Valley" notably, and traveled to Hawaii for "A Cowboy in Paradise", to Mexico City and Teotihuacán for "Lady on the Run", and to Sydney for "Night of the Shark" — second-unit footage came from London, Paris, Monaco, Rome, and Moscow at various times), but utilized the Universal back lot for many scenes.

A recurring theme in many episodes was the incorporation of a plot device from Hollywood cinema, particularly at the climax of an episode. Examples included chases on horseback to lasso cattle rustlers ("The Colorado Cattle Caper"), a 1930s-style gangster shoot-out (the film-within-a-film shot on location in "The Gang That Stole Manhattan"), a Jesse James-style train hold-up on the Long Island Rail Road ("Butch Cassidy Rides Again"), and a showdown with a vampire on the Third Street Bridge ("McCloud Meets Dracula").

== The Return of Sam McCloud ==
Weaver, Cannon and Carter later reprised their roles in a made-for-television movie, The Return of Sam McCloud, which premiered on November 12, 1989 on CBS. McCloud, who is now a United States Senator for New Mexico, faces off against a villainous chemical manufacturer after he kills McCloud's niece. Diana Muldaur also returned to reprise her role as McCloud's love interest, Chris Coughlin.

== Episodes ==
Season	Episodes	Originally released	
Season	Episodes	First released	Last released
Pilot		February 17, 1970	
1	6	September 16, 1970	October 21, 1970
2	7	September 22, 1971	February 23, 1972
3	5	October 1, 1972	February 4, 1973
4	5	October 14, 1973	February 24, 1974
5	9	September 22, 1974	March 20, 1975
6	7	September 21, 1975	March 21, 1976
7	6	October 24, 1976	April 17, 1977
Special		November 12, 1989	

== Home media ==
Universal Studios released Seasons 1 & 2 of McCloud on DVD in Region 1 and Region 2 in 2005/2006. Season 1 as released by Universal were not the original episodes but conflated "TV Movie" re-creations by Universal producer Harry Tatelman and editor Jean-Jacques Berthelot to extract additional revenues from a series considered too short of episodes to produce useful syndicated material. By editing together pieces from multiple episodes in season 1 it made it appear that McCloud solves two mysteries in each "movie". Subplots and some characters were edited out. This process was made easier by the fact that McCloud's uniform remained the same in each episode. The results were disjointed enough that at least one original writer, Douglas Heyes, required his name being changed in the credits to a pseudonym. These hybrid episodes were at one time considered all that was left of the original six programs of season 1 (Universal could not locate them when it issued the U.S. DVD set). The originals, located after a diligent search by the Australian independent label Madman Entertainment, were found in good condition stored in a vault at a station in London.

Visual Entertainment released the Complete series on DVD in Region 1 in January 2022.

In Denmark (region 2) where McCloud was a hit when it was new, all 7 seasons have been released on DVD.

In Region 4, Madman Entertainment has released all seven seasons on DVD in Australia. Seasons 6 & 7 were released on June 19, 2013. The Season 7 release includes the reunion television film The Return of Sam McCloud.

DVD Name	Ep#	Release dates	
DVD Name	Ep#	Region 1	Region 4
Seasons One & Two	11	August 9, 2005	April 19, 2010 (Season 1); September 13, 2010 (Season 2)
The Complete Third Season	5	N/A	March 16, 2011
The Complete Fourth Season	5	N/A	July 20, 2011
The Complete Fifth Season	9	N/A	October 19, 2011
The Complete Sixth Season	7	N/A	June 19, 2013
The Complete Seventh Season	6	N/A	June 19, 2013
The Complete Series	45	January 2022	N/A

The show is rated PG for Parental Guidance in Australia and PG in New Zealand for violence and drug references.

== In popular culture ==
- McCloud became the basis for a recurring joke on the movie-mocking TV series Mystery Science Theater 3000: whenever one character in the featured film would call out for someone else, host characters Joel Robinson, Tom Servo, and Crow T. Robot would chime in by calling out to other unrelated (mostly) fictional characters—among them Sondra Locke, ALF, John-boy, Angels, Bosley, Mr. Drysdale, Mrs. Beasley, Mr. French, Uncle Bill, Boo Radley, Beastmaster, Cujo, and "Mr. Eddie's father". Invariably, these exchanges ended with Servo calling "Chief?" and Crow responding with "McCloud!" The gag was most prominently featured in episode 303, "Pod People".
- McCloud was also parodied by British comedian Benny Hill in a skit on The Benny Hill Show, “Murder on the Oregon Express”, in March 1976. In typical Hill fashion, Benny portrays a host of characters for comic effect from American crime-dramas of the time, such as Cannon, Ironside, and Kojak.
- Weaver played a version of himself in The Hardy Boys/Nancy Drew Mysteries, in an episode set on the Universal backlot (where much of McCloud was actually shot), in which he rides out of nowhere and saves Pamela Sue Martin's Nancy Drew by drawing her up on his horse when she is in a tight spot. His small bit of dialogue makes clear that he is an actor on a break from a shoot, and his costuming and horse suggest that he is Weaver on a break from McCloud, but like several other celebrity guests in the episode, it's never made explicit that he is playing himself.
- A thirteenth season episode of The Simpsons, "The Lastest Gun in the West", features guest star Weaver as old-time cowboy star Buck McCoy, who had starred on a 1970s detective show called "McTrigger", about which McCoy admits, "Seems all I did was shoot hippies." A clip showed McTrigger driving through New York in a convertible shooting at random members of the hippie crowd that covered the sidewalks. McCoy mentions the show was retooled after his character was written out to become Room 222.

== Syndication ==
McCloud has aired in reruns on local stations in the past, and continues to do so on some to this day.

Me-TV brought McCloud to its schedule as part of the late night "MeTV Mystery Movie" programming block which premiered on January 1, 2015. The network was employing a wheel arrangement similar to the original NBC Wednesday and Sunday Mystery Movie and rotated several other long-running programs from those including, McMillan & Wife, Columbo, Banacek, Quincy and the Perry Mason telefilms produced by NBC. The network eventually ceased airing the Mystery Movies, which moved to Cozi TV.
