= McMillan & Wife =

American police procedural television series (1971–1977)

- McMillan & Wife title card marquee
- Also known as: McMillan (season 6)
- Genre: Police procedural
- Starring: Rock Hudson; Susan Saint James
- Theme music composer: Jerry Fielding
- Country of origin: United States
- Original language: English
- No. of seasons: 6
- No. of episodes: 40 (list of episodes)

Production
- Executive producer: Leonard B. Stern
- Producers: Paul Mason; Jon Epstein
- Running time: 90 minutes (seasons 1-2); 120 minutes (seasons 3-5); 90 minutes (season 6)
- Production companies: Talent Associates-Norton Simon; Universal Television

Original release
- Network: NBC
- Release: September 17, 1971 – April 24, 1977

McMillan & Wife (known simply as McMillan from 1976 to 1977) is an American police procedural television series that aired on NBC from September 17, 1971, to April 24, 1977. Starring Rock Hudson and Susan Saint James in the title roles, the series premiered in episodes as part of Universal Television's wheel series NBC Mystery Movie, in rotation with Columbo and McCloud. Initially airing on Wednesday night, the original lineup was shifted to Sundays in the second season, where it aired for the rest of its run. For the final season, known as McMillan, numerous changes were made.

== Plot ==
McMillan & Wife revolved around Stuart "Mac" McMillan (Rock Hudson), a former criminal defense attorney who becomes San Francisco police commissioner, and his wife Sally (Susan Saint James). The episodes often found Mac and Sally attending fashionable parties and charity benefits before solving robberies and murders. John Schuck as McMillan's aide, Sgt. Charles Enright and Nancy Walker as Mildred, the couple's sarcastic, hard-drinking maid, provided comic relief.

Sally is pregnant at the end of season 1, but this is apparently retconned away and is never mentioned in later seasons. She is pregnant again in season 4 and has the baby (a boy) in the final episode of season 4. The baby is not seen or mentioned in season 5.

== Cast ==
Mac and Sally with Dr. Marion Voight (played by Sheree North), 1972.

Actor	Role
Rock Hudson	Police Commissioner Stuart "Mac" McMillan
Susan Saint James	Sally Hull McMillan
John Schuck	Sergeant/ Lt. Charles Enright
Nancy Walker	Mildred
Martha Raye	Agatha
Bill Quinn	Police Chief Paulson
Mildred Natwick	Beatrice McMillan (Mac's mother)
Linda Watkins	Emily Hull (Sally's mother)
Richard Gilliland	Sergeant Steve DiMaggio
Gloria Stroock	Maggie
John Astin	Medical Examiner Sykes (3 episodes)
Martin E. Brooks	Deputy D.A. Chapman (6 episodes)

== Episodes ==
Season	Episodes	Originally released	
Season	Episodes	First released	Last released
1	8	September 17, 1971	March 1, 1972
2	7	September 24, 1972	April 1, 1973
3	6	September 30, 1973	February 17, 1974
4	6	September 29, 1974	March 16, 1975
5	7	September 28, 1975	March 7, 1976
6	6	December 5, 1976	April 24, 1977

The show ran for five seasons as McMillan & Wife and a sixth season as McMillan on the NBC television network, from September 17, 1971, to April 24, 1977, for a total of 40 episodes.

== Popularity ==
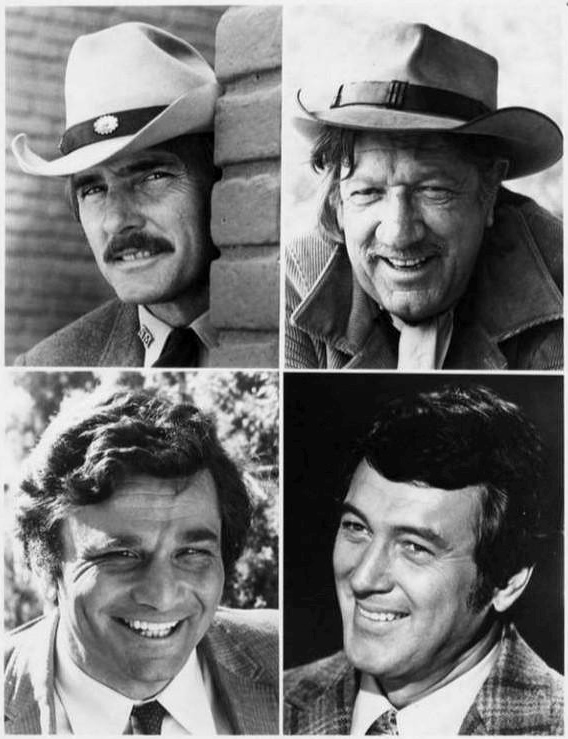
The NBC Sunday Mystery Movie program worked on a rotating basis - one per month from each of its shows. Top left: Dennis Weaver in McCloud. Top right: Richard Boone in Hec Ramsey. Bottom left: Peter Falk in Columbo. Bottom right: Rock Hudson in McMillan & Wife.

Like the other two original shows in the NBC Mystery Movie, McMillan & Wife was an immediate hit. After its network run on NBC, it appeared regularly as part of The CBS Late Movie and later, in the form of syndicated reruns on local and cable television in the United States.

On January 1, 2015, McMillan & Wife began airing on MeTV as part of the "MeTV Mystery Movie" late night block. That block included the other two long running Sunday Mystery Movie series, McCloud and Columbo, the Wednesday Mystery Movie series Banacek and the Perry Mason television movies. Each week featured a different series, with the series airing every night during its feature week.

Beginning in 2022, the series airs on Cozi TV as part of a "Columbo & Company" programming block, paired with episodes of The NBC Mystery Movie programs Columbo; McCloud; Banacek and Quincy, M.E.

== Cast and series name change ==
For its sixth and final season, the series underwent a major retooling. Susan Saint James left after being unable to come to terms on a new contract. Nancy Walker also left the series before the sixth season premiered in 1976 to star in The Nancy Walker Show, a sitcom that was cancelled after 12 episodes.

With these developments, the show became known as McMillan and Sally was killed off in a plane crash along with the couple's never-seen son. Mac, now a widower, moved out of the family home and into a luxury apartment. Mildred, meanwhile, was written out as having left the McMillans to open her own diner on the East Coast, which was an inside joke playing up her role as Rosie the waitress in a then-ongoing series of commercials for Bounty paper towels.

John Schuck had his role reduced as he joined the sitcom Holmes & Yoyo which was produced by Leonard B. Stern. Meanwhile, Sergeant Enright was promoted to Lieutenant and became Deputy Chief of the San Francisco Police, a move that took him away from his role as Mac's liaison. Martha Raye, who had played Mildred's sister Agatha in an earlier episode, joined the series full-time, with Agatha taking over Mildred's role as Mac's housekeeper in his new apartment. Richard Gilliland joined the cast as Enright's replacement, Sergeant DiMaggio, who always introduced himself by saying "no relation" (in reference to Joe DiMaggio).

== Home media ==
Universal Studios released the first season of McMillan & Wife on DVD in Region 1 & Region 2 in 2005/2006.

On May 21, 2010, Visual Entertainment announced it had acquired the rights to distribute McMillan & Wife on DVD in Region 1. They subsequently released seasons 2–6 on DVD in Canada and the USA. All US releases are distributed by Millennium Entertainment.

On November 30, 2012, VEI released McMillan & Wife: The Complete Series on DVD in both the US and Canada. This 24-disc set features all 40 episodes of the series as well as bonus copy of The Snoop Sisters Complete Collection.

In Region 4, Madman Entertainment has released all six seasons on DVD in Australia. On November 20, 2013, it released McMillan and Wife: The Complete Collection, a 19-disc set featuring all 40 episodes of the series.

DVD Name	Ep#	Release dates		
DVD Name	Ep#	Region 1 (US)	Region 1 (CAN)	Region 4
Season One	8	August 9, 2005		April 19, 2010
Season Two	7	June 7, 2011	August 24, 2010	September 15, 2010
Season Three	6	June 7, 2011	March 8, 2011	March 16, 2011
Season Four	6	July 5, 2011	July 26, 2011	July 20, 2011
Season Five	7	July 5, 2011	July 26, 2011	October 19, 2011
Season Six	6	September 20, 2011		March 20, 2013
Complete Series	40	November 30, 2012		November 20, 2013

== Filming locations ==
The interior set of the McMillans' home in the pilot episode was actually Rock Hudson's house. In the second episode, they moved to a new home; exterior shots were done on Greenwich Street in San Francisco. The couple's address was once listed in the show as 250 Trenton Street. In later episodes, a different house was used for the exterior shots. In the final season, McMillan, newly widowed, moved into an apartment, and the house was never seen or mentioned again.
