= List of McCloud episodes =

This is a list of episodes for the television series McCloud.

== Series overview ==
Season	Episodes	Originally released	
Season	Episodes	First released	Last released
Pilot		February 17, 1970	
1	6	September 16, 1970	October 21, 1970
2	7	September 22, 1971	February 23, 1972
3	5	October 1, 1972	February 4, 1973
4	5	October 14, 1973	February 24, 1974
5	9	September 22, 1974	March 20, 1975
6	7	September 21, 1975	March 21, 1976
7	6	October 24, 1976	April 17, 1977
Special		November 12, 1989	

== Episodes ==
Run time is the length in minutes of the intended time slot (including commercials).

=== Pilot (1970) ===
No. overall	No. in season	Title	Directed by	Written by	Run Time	Original release date
1	1	"McCloud: Who Killed Miss U.S.A.?" "Portrait of a Dead Girl"	Richard A. Colla	Story by : Stanford Whitmore; Teleplay by : Stanford Whitmore and Richard Levinson & William Link	120	February 17, 1970
McCloud escorts a witness from New Mexico to New York, but loses him and lands in a murder case involving Puerto Rican nationalists, a lady novelist, a Wall Street lawyer, and a dead beauty pageant winner. With Raul Julia, Julie Newmar, Diana Muldaur, Shelly Novack and Craig Stevens. Peter Mark Richman played Chief Clifford in this pilot. Also known as "Who Killed Merri-Ann?"

=== Season 1 (1970) ===
No. overall	No. in season	Title	Directed by	Written by	Run Time	Original release date
2	1	"Who Says You Can't Make Friends in New York City"	Douglas Heyes	Douglas Heyes	60	September 16, 1970
McCloud goes to help a lady in distress in the room across from him at his hotel, but gets caught in a shootout that sends him back to Taos on Chief Clifford's orders. Guest stars Carl Betz, Marj Dusay.
3	2	"Horse Stealing on Fifth Avenue"	Bruce Kessler	Glen A. Larson	60	September 23, 1970
McCloud is becoming famous thanks to an article by Chris Coughlin in the Chronicle. It doesn't endear him to the boys in blue, who have to deal with a string of drugstore holdups. With Diana Muldaur, Lorraine Gary, J. D. Cannon and Ric Mancini.
4	3	"The Concrete Corral"	Nicholas Colasanto	Warren Douglas and David P. Harmon	60	September 30, 1970
McCloud is assigned to keep an eye on a boisterous bunch of rodeo riders at Madison Square Garden. He encounters an ex-girlfriend and a murder. With Albert Salmi, Nancy Malone and Joanna Moore. Doug McClure in an uncredited cameo.
5	4	"The Stage Is All the World"	Russ Mayberry	Norman Hudis	60	October 7, 1970
McCloud is assigned to protect a British theatrical maven who has received letters assailing his "filthy, obscene" productions and threatening his life. With Richard Dawson, Tina Sinatra. Teri Garr in early uncredited role.
6	5	"Walk in the Dark"	Russ Mayberry	Leslie Stevens	60	October 14, 1970
Chief Clifford sends McCloud to the all female Special Auxiliary Force VI under the command of Sgt. Dameron, where he works to catch a murderer in Central Park. With Nina Foch, Ann Prentiss, Susan Saint James and Bart Burns.
7	6	"Our Man in Paris"	Russ Mayberry	Leslie Stevens	60	October 21, 1970
With the life of Chief Clifford on the line, McCloud travels to Paris, where he and a stewardess try to locate a mysterious arms smuggler. With Susan Strasberg, Alfred Ryder and John van Dreelen.

=== Season 1 Re-edited for Syndication (1976-77) ===
The 6 original 60-minute episodes of season 1 were combined into 3 new episodes for syndication. Some material was cut and some linking voice-overs were added. Directors and Writers are shown as they appear in the on-screen credits. "Matthew Howard" is reportedly a pseudonym for Douglas Heyes, who wrote the original episode 1.

No. overall	No. in season	Title	Directed by	Written by	Run Time	Copyright Year
-	1	"Man from Taos"	Russ Mayberry and Douglas Heyes	Matthew Howard and Leslie Stevens	120	1977
Re-edited from original episodes 1 and 6: "Who Says You Can't Make Friends in New York City" and "Our Man in Paris".
-	2	"Manhattan Manhunt"	Russ Mayberry and Bruce Kessler	Norman Hudis and Glen A. Larson	90	1976
Re-edited from original episodes 2 and 4: "Horse Stealing on Fifth Avenue" and "The Stage Is All the World".
-	3	"Murder Arena"	Russ Mayberry and Nicholas Colasanto	Leslie Stevens and Warren Douglas and David P. Harmon, Adaptation by Francesca Turner	90	1977
Re-edited from original episodes 3 and 5: "The Concrete Corral" and "Walk in the Dark".

=== Season 2 (1971–72) ===
No. overall	No. in season	Title	Directed by	Written by	Run Time	Original release date
8	1	"Encounter with Aries"	Russ Mayberry	Peter Allan Fields	90	September 22, 1971
The wife (Louise Latham) of a celebrity astrologer (Sebastian Cabot) is kidnapped in broad daylight. As McCloud, Broadhurst, and Clifford work the case from the astrologer's home, the kidnapper appears in person, threatening not to reveal the location of the bomb set to go off with the wife tied up nearby, if his ransom demand is not met. Also stars Peter Haskell and Alan Oppenheimer.
9	2	"Top of the World, Ma!"	Alex March	Story by : Ray Danton; Teleplay by : Peter Allan Fields	90	November 3, 1971
A former football player, now a collection-agency henchman from Ohio, arrives in New York with his mother. His true motive for the visit is to track down the New York mobster who owes him his entitled cut of $10,000 from a past transaction. With Bo Svenson, Robert Webber, Joan Blondell, Stefanie Powers, Milton Selzer and Vincent Gardenia.
10	3	"Somebody's Out to Get Jennie"	Jack Smight	Robert Presnell Jr.	90	November 24, 1971
An industrial engineer is thought to have died in a helicopter explosion, but Jennie (Julie Sommars), his secretary who is also in love with him, is convinced he's still alive. The people behind the crime manipulate her psychologically to discredit her mental stability before McCloud can piece together the truth. With Barry Sullivan, Cameron Mitchell, Priscilla Pointer and Gabriel Dell.
11	4	"The Disposal Man"	Boris Sagal	Story by : Mel Arrighi; Teleplay by : Mel Arrighi and Dean Hargrove	90	December 29, 1971
To stop a paid killer, you've got to think like one. McCloud interviews a former hit man to intercept a professional contract killer out to get a tycoon. With Patrick O'Neal, Nita Talbot, Arthur O'Connell, Randolph Mantooth and James McEachin.
12	5	"A Little Plot at Tranquil Valley"	Jack Smight	Peter Allan Fields	90	January 12, 1972
McCloud is taken hostage after following the trail of a pharmaceutical company robbery masterminded by the director of the Tranquil Valley network of funeral homes. With Vic Morrow, Burgess Meredith, Allen Garfield, Moses Gunn and Joyce Van Patten.
13	6	"The Fifth Man in a String Quartet"	Russ Mayberry	James D. Buchanan & Ronald Austin	90	February 2, 1972
A musician is framed for the killing of his teacher, a violinist whose long-lost brother was in the mob. With Shelley Fabares, Gary Collins, Avery Schreiber and Neville Brand.
14	7	"Give My Regrets to Broadway"	Lou Antonio	Peter Allan Fields	90	February 23, 1972
McCloud trades shifts with another police officer to be able to have dinner and watch the basketball game on TV with Chris (Diana Muldaur). That officer is killed on duty, leading McCloud to a Broadway producer (Milton Berle). Also stars Lane Bradbury, Barbara Rhoades and Barbara Rush.

=== Season 3 (1972–73) ===
No. overall	No. in season	Title	Directed by	Written by	Run Time	Original release date
15	1	"The New Mexican Connection"	Russ Mayberry, Hy Averback	Glen A. Larson	120	October 1, 1972
A TV commentator's critique of police shootings tarnishes the department's stakeout squad, and Chris Coughlin is threatened to force the release of a murder suspect extradited to Taos by McCloud. With Jackie Cooper, Ricky Nelson, Murray Hamilton and Sharon Gless.
16	2	"The Barefoot Stewardess Caper"	Harry Falk	Story by : B.W. Sandefur; Teleplay by : Glen A. Larson and Michael Gleason	120	December 3, 1972
A bevy of international stewardesses have a second career as cat burglars. With Jacques Aubuchon, Britt Ekland, Joann Pflug and Lincoln Kilpatrick.
17	3	"The Park Avenue Rustlers"	Jack Arnold	Sy Salkowitz	90	December 24, 1972
As part of a pilot program, McCloud is assigned a female partner, and the two go undercover against a big-time auto theft ring. With Eddie Albert, Brenda Vaccaro, Norman Fell and Lloyd Bochner.
18	4	"Showdown at the End of the World"	Lou Antonio	Robert Hamner	90	January 7, 1973
An ambitious junior executive in the mob uses fashion models to transport heroin into New York. With Lee J. Cobb, Jaclyn Smith and Bradford Dillman.
19	5	"The Million Dollar Roundup"	Douglas Heyes	Douglas Heyes	120	February 4, 1973
A dying Roman mobster wills his "Saracen Horse," a jewel-encrusted green jade treasure, to any of his criminal colleagues who can take possession of it. With Eric Braeden, Harry Guardino, Teri Garr, Nehemiah Persoff and Tracy Reed.

=== Season 4 (1973–74) ===
No. overall	No. in season	Title	Directed by	Written by	Run Time	Original release date
20	1	"Butch Cassidy Rides Again"	Barry Shear	Glen A. Larson	120	October 14, 1973
A band of old-school outlaws disrupt a staged bank robbery and wreak havoc on New York. With Linda Evans, William Daniels, Lloyd Nolan, Stefanie Powers and Roger Davis.
21	2	"The Solid Gold Swingers"	Lou Antonio	Michael Gleason	120	December 2, 1973
While answering a high-rise apartment burglary call, McCloud stumbles on a body, which then disappears. The case leads to a VIP madam under indictment, whose girls are apparently being murdered by a serial killer. With Ross Martin, Joanna Pettet, Neville Brand, Joanna Barnes, Steve Allen and Teri Garr.
22	3	"A Cowboy in Paradise"	Jerry Paris	Jimmy Sangster	120	January 20, 1974
Just before presenting a rackets case, Chief Clifford goes to Hawaii for a police conference. McCloud is obliged to dragoon a vacationing N.Y. policewoman when the Chief is set up on a murder. With Martha Hyer, Louise Lasser, Don Ho.
23	4	"The Colorado Cattle Caper"	Robert Day	Michael Gleason	90	February 24, 1974
On escort duty in Colorado, McCloud runs into a cattle-rustling ring providing meat for Eastern markets. With Claude Akins, Patrick Wayne, John Denver, Ed Ames and Farrah Fawcett.
24	5	"This Must Be the Alamo"	Bruce Kessler	Glen A. Larson	120	March 24, 1974
During a heat wave, Chief Clifford is called away and leaves Sgt. Broadhurst in charge. A football gambling ring that scores with "inside dope on injuries" loses a little black book and begins eliminating witnesses in a search for it, leading to an assault on precinct headquarters. With Van Johnson, Teri Garr, Laraine Stephens, Della Reese and Gregory Sierra.

=== Season 5 (1974–75) ===
No. overall	No. in season	Title	Directed by	Written by	Run Time	Original release date
25	1	"The Barefoot Girls of Bleecker Street"	Barry Shear	Lou Shaw	120	September 22, 1974
McCloud is on the search of a young teenager (Kay Lenz) with a sick baby in need of medical attention. His investigation leads to a credit-card burglary ring that employs runaway teen-aged girls. Also with Gordon MacRae, Shelley Winters and Ken Lynch.
26	2	"The Gang That Stole Manhattan"	Bruce Kessler	Story by : Gerry Day & Bethel Leslie; Teleplay by : Nicholas E. Baehr	120	October 13, 1974
A mobster finally finds a foolproof plan of robbing Beverly & Co. of its jewels by funding a Sting-like movie shoot nearby to serve as a distraction. McCloud is initially assigned crowd control duty on the shoot but things gets serious when someone is found murdered at one of the shooting locations. To make matters worse, the film's male lead (Larry Hagman) interferes with the investigation, trying to emulate the skills of the detective character he plays on TV to try to solve the case. Also with Leslie Parrish, Fernando Lamas, Larry Hagman, and Ruth McDevitt.
27	3	"Shivaree on Delancy Street"	Bruce Kessler	Morton Fine	120	November 3, 1974
A tailor (Danny Thomas) participates in a neighborhood numbers racket, whose numbers come up but the cash collected for the draw is stolen in a heist. Sgt. Broadhurst (Terry Carter) is badly wounded in the theft, with the robber planting a part of the stolen money on him, causing him to be investigated by Internal Affairs. With Louis Gossett Jr., Cesare Danova and Jack Kruschen.
28	4	"The 42nd Street Cavalry"	Jerry Jameson	Michael Gleason	120	November 17, 1974
Chief Clifford assigns McCloud to the Mounted Unit as a fence sets up a munitions theft at a National Guard Armory (USMC) for a revolutionary group. In their pursuit of the suspects, the Mounted Unit's instructor is killed, leaving McCloud to be the temporary instructor to the rag-tag team of mounted police officers who get no respect from the rest of the NYPD. Suggested by a story by Arthur Deutsch. Stars Michael Parks, Julie Sommars, Peter Mark Richman and Rafael Campos.
29	5	"The Concrete Jungle Caper"	Gene Levitt	Story by : Jimmy Sangster and Lou Shaw; Teleplay by : Lou Shaw	90	November 24, 1974
The international drug trade and a dealer named Harry Hague have McCloud undercover and in prison to root out the Rhigas crime family. With John Russell, Brock Peters, Joseph Campanella, Angel Tompkins, and John Marley.
30	6	"The Man with the Golden Hat"	Lou Antonio	Story by : Lou Shaw and Glen A. Larson; Teleplay by : Lou Shaw	120	January 12, 1975
After hanging his Stetson in a diner, McCloud is stymied by various attempts to relieve him of it. His clues lead to a ballet company on the verge of folding, and a philanthropic foundation with millions missing from its books. With Don Ameche, Jaclyn Smith, Roger C. Carmel, Robert Webber and Mills Watson.
31	7	"Lady on the Run"	Russ Mayberry	Gilbert Edd	120	January 26, 1975
A woman pursues the hit man who killed her sister, and in Mexico City is pursued herself. With Mariette Hartley, Clu Gulager, Roger Cudney, Pancho Córdova and Coleen Gray.
32	8	"Sharks!"	E.W. Swackhamer	Story by : Stephen Lord; Teleplay by : Lou Shaw	120	February 23, 1975
The murder of an Indian girl causes McCloud to pose as a businessman in desperate need of money. With Christopher George, Lynda Day George, Pat Hingle, A Martinez and Dick Haymes.
33	9	"Return to the Alamo"	Walter Doniger	Glen A. Larson	90	March 30, 1975
On the graveyard shift, Chief Clifford and much of the staff are out with the flu, the American Brotherhood Movement is blowing up buildings, Chris Coughlin is writing a story with a feminist angle on the NYPD, a robbery suspect's brother (an addict) tries to break him out by kidnapping the Acting Watch Commander (Sgt. Broadhurst), McCloud pulls in New York's top drug dealers in a citywide search for a junkie whose addicted newborn infant needs urgent treatment, and Sgt. Phyllis Norton (Teri Garr) is the Acting Deputy Watch Commander in charge. With Brad Dexter, Jeanne Cooper, Roger E. Mosley and Charles Tyner.

=== Season 6 (1975–76) ===
No. overall	No. in season	Title	Directed by	Written by	Run Time	Original release date
34	1	"Park Avenue Pirates"	E.W. Swackhamer	Lou Shaw	120	September 21, 1975
McCloud pursues a record-company executive who is illegally profiting from records done by a popular performer. With Jessica Walter, Lorna Luft, Barbi Benton, Paul Hampton, and Raymond St. Jacques.
35	2	"Showdown at Times Square"	Ron Satlof	Story by : Sidney Ellis; Teleplay by : Lou Shaw	120	October 19, 1975
Chief Clifford is running a weekly bull session; that is, the detectives squawk and he gives them a talk. McCloud notices smoke signals coming from a nearby roof. Chief Stillwater is seeking his grandson Johnny, who has followed a gang of thieves to New York. Johnny's father is in jail back home in Phoenix, framed by the gang. With Don Meredith, Henry Gibson, Chief Dan George, Sharon Farrell and Allan Miller.
36	3	"Fire!"	Lou Antonio	Robert Hamilton and Lou Shaw	120	November 16, 1975
Chris Coughlin's high-rise apartment building is torched by an arsonist for hire. With Robert Reed, George Gaynes, Adrienne La Russa and Stack Pierce.
37	4	"Three Guns for New York"	Bruce Kessler	Jeff Sharkey	120	November 23, 1975
Paroled bank robbers from New Mexico come to New York seeking revenge on McCloud for foiling their plans and to collect $400,000 they believe he stole from them, which leads the marshal back home to Taos for a showdown. With Neville Brand, Greg Mullavey, and Wright King.
38	5	"Our Man in the Harem"	E.W. Swackhamer	Story by : Lou Shaw and Glen A. Larson; Teleplay by : Lou Shaw	120	January 11, 1976
A patrolman's daughter is held captive in the Middle East. With Michael Ansara, Anne Archer, Robert Karnes, Jeff Corey, Randi Oakes and Kathrine Baumann.
39	6	"The Day New York Turned Blue"	E.W. Swackhamer	Glen A. Larson	120	February 22, 1976
During a New York City snowstorm, a union lawyer is placed in protective custody as a witness to graft, a working girl is slipping out-of-towners a mickey and painting them blue, a Federal Inspector is auditing the Department books, the mob plans an invasion of headquarters, and patrolmen have a strike meeting. With Bernadette Peters, Gig Young, William Daniels, Marge Redmond and Carl Weathers.
40	7	"Night of the Shark"	Ron Satlof	Glen A. Larson	120	March 21, 1976
The American mob plans an Australian expansion, with the help of a planted Chairman on Sydney's Police Board. McCloud, on airport duty at JFK, has a shootout with a hit man and goes to Sydney as a witness. This episode featured actual location shooting in Australia. With Lloyd Bochner, Max Cullen, Victoria Shaw, Ray Warren and Gus Mercurio.

=== Season 7 (1976–77) ===
No. overall	No. in season	Title	Directed by	Written by	Run Time	Original release date
41	1	"Bonnie and McCloud"	Steven H. Stern	Michael Sloan	90	October 24, 1976
The head of a trucking company is shot and McCloud inadvertently aids and abets the culprit, who turns out to be a former employee of the company and his current lady friend. With Leigh Taylor-Young, Vic Tayback, Richard Jaeckel, Geoffrey Lewis, and Dennis Burkley.
42	2	"'Twas the Fight Before Christmas..."	Dennis Weaver	Story by : Allan Folsom & David H. Balkan and Michael Sloan; Teleplay by : Michael Sloan	90	December 26, 1976
On Christmas Eve, an assassin stalks McCloud, a spurned mistress attempts suicide, a sidewalk Santa turns mugger, junkies raid a hospital pharmacy, Chris's newspaper organizes a party for orphans at Westside Hospital with Chief Clifford as Santa, and the junkies take hostages. With Dean Stockwell, Linda Gray, Ann Dusenberry and William Sylvester. (The only Christmas episode for any Mystery Movie element.)
43	3	"The Great Taxicab Stampede"	Ivan Dixon	Story by : Gregory S. Dinallo; Teleplay by : Michael Sloan	90	January 16, 1977
McCloud is framed for the murder of a cab driver who is part of a drug smuggling ring and must clear his name while on suspension. Not only that, he is also the target of the hack's vengeful sister, who happens to be an Israeli spy. With George Hamilton, Jane Seymour and Don Brodie.
44	4	"The Moscow Connection"	Bruce Kessler	Michael Kozoll	90	January 23, 1977
McCloud and Chief Clifford go undercover with a touring country music singer to the Soviet Union to unravel a heroin smuggling operation. With Britt Ekland, Hoyt Axton, Nehemiah Persoff, L.Q. Jones and Morgan Paull.
45	5	"London Bridges"	Noel Black	Michael Sloan	90	March 6, 1977
A peer of the realm, who's a photographer as well as a cat burglar, comes to America and, in flagrante delicto at a Long Island costume party, witnesses a killing at the hands of Irish bombers, all of which sends McCloud to Blighty, where the target remains to be found. With Jack Cassidy, Richard Sanders and Adam Faith.
46	6	"McCloud Meets Dracula"	Bruce Kessler	Glen A. Larson	90	April 17, 1977
Murder victims are found to be drained of blood, and an elderly star of vampire films is suspected; Chief Clifford is on the hunt for a sniper. With John Carradine, Ken Lynch, Carole Mallory, Michael Sacks and Tom Snyder appears as himself.

== Special (1989) ==
Title	Directed by	Written by	Original release date
"The Return of Sam McCloud"	Alan J. Levi	Michael Sloan	November 12, 1989
Senator Sam McCloud of New Mexico wrangles an unscrupulous chemical manufacturer. His niece is murdered investigating the outfit, while he escapes assassination attempts apparently from Arab terrorists, and it takes a showdown in London to settle things. With David McCallum, Patrick Macnee, Diana Muldaur, Roger Rees.

== See also ==
List of The NBC Mystery Movie episodes
