= Hec Ramsey =

American western television series (1972-1974)

- Genre: Western; Mystery
- Created by: Harold Jack Bloom
- Starring: Richard Boone; Rick Lenz; Harry Morgan
- Country of origin: United States
- No. of seasons: 2
- No. of episodes: 10

Production
- Executive producer: Jack Webb
- Producers: Douglas Benton; Harold Jack Bloom
- Running time: 90 min.; 120 min.
- Production companies: Mark VII Limited; Universal Television

Original release
- Network: NBC
- Release: October 8, 1972 – April 7, 1974

Hec Ramsey is an American television series that aired on NBC from 1972 to 1974. It starring Richard Boone as the title character, a forensic science investigator in the old west. The series was created by Jack Webb's production company, Mark VII Limited in association with Universal's television productions. The series was first broadcast in the United States by NBC as part of the NBC Mystery Movie, a wheel series format.

== Cast ==
=== Main ===
- Richard Boone as Deputy Chief Hec Ramsey
- Rick Lenz as Chief Oliver Stamp
- Harry Morgan as Doc Amos Coogan

=== Recurring ===
- Perry Lopez as Sergeant Juan Mendoza
- Dennis Rucker as Constable Arne Tornquist
- Bill Vint as Constable Davey Watson

== Premise ==
Richard Boone portrayed Hector "Hec" Ramsey, a former gunfighter turned lawman, with a keen interest in the emerging field of forensic science. Hec replaced his "gunfighter" rig with a cut-down Colt revolver—"Faster draw, good at short range. Use a rifle for long."—that echoed modern detectives' guns, but his most important tools included fingerprinting equipment and magnifying lenses, which enabled him to determine the perpetrators of crimes with greater accuracy. Ramsey had served as a Deputy United States Marshal in the Oklahoma Indian Territory under the supervision of Judge Isaac Parker, Judge of the United States District Court for the Western District of Arkansas, which had jurisdiction for the Indian Territory.

The series follows Ramsey after he accepts the position of deputy police chief in the fictional town of New Prospect, Oklahoma. In the series' pilot, "The Century Turns", set in 1901, Hec meets New Prospect's chief of police, Oliver B. Stamp (Rick Lenz), a young, inexperienced lawman who needs help and after some initial friction, the two men develop a working relationship. They are frequently accompanied by a colorful local doctor, Amos Coogan, who is also the local Coroner/Medical Examiner (played by frequent Webb performer Harry Morgan, who was also a regular on The Richard Boone Show).

== Production ==
The series was one of the first television Westerns set in the early 20th century at a time when viewer interest in the old West was waning. Two contemporary series with a similar setting were Nichols and Bearcats! (the latter was set in 1914).

Producer Jack Webb described Hec Ramsey as "Dragnet meets John Wayne" and critics picked up on that. The scripts balanced authentic "modern" investigative methods of the 1900s with action and adventure.

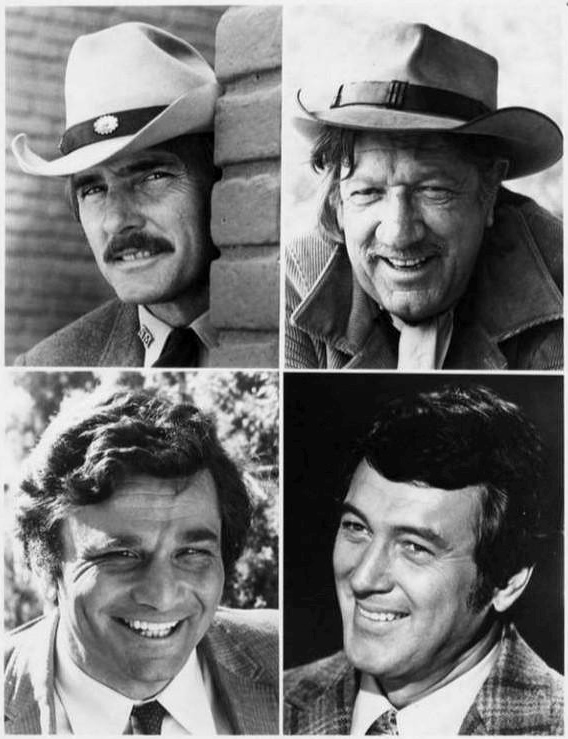
The NBC Sunday Mystery Movie cycled four ongoing programs in one time slot with one episode per month from each series. Top left: Dennis Weaver in McCloud, top right: Richard Boone in Hec Ramsey, bottom left: Peter Falk in Columbo, bottom right: Rock Hudson in McMillan & Wife.

Despite good ratings, the series was canceled after two seasons, following disagreements between Boone and Universal. Douglas Benton and creator Harold Jack Bloom were the producers; Jack Webb was executive producer.

Among the guest stars in the series' 10 episodes, were: Claude Akins, Rory Calhoun, Jackie Cooper (in "Dead Heat"), Angie Dickinson, Steve Forrest, Kim Hunter, Rita Moreno, Sheree North, Ruth Roman, Kurt Russell (in "Scar Tissue"), Stuart Whitman (in "A Hard Road to Vengeance") and Marie Windsor (in "Mystery of the Green Feather").

== Episodes ==
=== Season 1 (1972–73) ===
No.	Title	Directed by	Written by	Original release date
1	"The Century Turns"	Daniel Petrie	Harold Jack Bloom	October 8, 1972
An aging lawman in 1901 Oklahoma employs the latest crime detection techniques to solve the murder of a homesteading couple while overcoming the skepticism of his young, college-educated police chief. Guest stars: Ray Middleton, Sharon Acker, Dick Van Patten and Harry Morgan
2	"Hangman's Wages"	George Marshall	Shimon Wincelberg	October 29, 1972
Legendary outlaw Wes Durham is being held in the New Prospect jail, awaiting a new form of execution: electric chair. Hec's job is to uncover and capture an admirer of the outlaw, who is killing a person each day until Durham is set free. Guest stars: Steve Forrest, Lee Montgomery, Stella Stevens and G.D. Spradlin.
3	"The Mystery of the Green Feather"	Herschel Daugherty	John Meston	December 17, 1972
Hec sets out to uncover the killers of a family of settlers. Their arrow-pierced bodies and a brave's medicine bag containing a green feather implicate a local Native American tribe, but Hec is reluctant to rush to judgment. Guest stars: Lorraine Gary, Lloyd Bochner, John Fiedler and Rory Calhoun.
4	"The Mystery of the Yellow Rose"	Douglas Benton	Story : William R. Cox, Douglas Benton; Teleplay : John Meston	January 28, 1973
Hec tracks a check forger to Santa Rita, New Mexico, where he encounters an old flame who is being framed for murder. Hec plays attorney to free his friend, which puts him afoul of Henry T. Madden, a tyrant who holds the town in fear. Guest stars: Diana Muldaur, Claude Akins, Virginia Gregg and David Brian.
5	"The Mystery of Chalk Hill"	Harry Morgan	Harold Swanton	February 18, 1973
Hec quits his job and relocates to Enid, Oklahoma, where he immediately finds himself hard driven to solve a tragic double-homicide. Guest stars: Bruce Davison, Jeanette Nolan, Pat Hingle and Louise Latham.

=== Season 2 (1973–74) ===
No.	Title	Directed by	Written by	Original release date
6	"A Hard Road to Vengeance"	Alex March	Story : S. Bar-David; Teleplay : S. Bar-David & Harold Jack Bloom	November 25, 1973
A lawman arrives in the town of New Prospect to tell the citizens his side of the story of how he shot the idolized outlaw they're about to honor with a monument. Guest stars: Keenan Wynn, Rita Moreno, Harold J. Stone, Stuart Whitman, Perry Lopez and Ruth Roman.
7	"The Detroit Connection"	Nicholas Colasanto	Joseph Calvelli	December 30, 1973
When a crime syndicate from Detroit murders one of the oil drillers they have tricked into accepting loans, Hec sets out to take them down. Guest stars: Angie Dickinson, Kim Hunter, Richard Jordan and Marshall Thompson.
8	"Dead Heat"	Richard Quine	Brad Radnitz	February 3, 1974
A young man dies of heart failure and Hec suspects foul play. Guest stars: Sheree North, Jackie Cooper, John Anderson and Alfred Ryder.
9	"Scar Tissue"	Andrew V. McLaglen	Mann Rubin	March 10, 1974
Matthias Kane comes to New Prospect looking for the father he never met. Hec befriends the hot-headed young man and assists him in locating his father, uncovering dark secrets and shady pasts in the process. Guest stars: Kurt Russell, Chill Wills, Hilarie Thompson and Albert Salmi.
10	"Only Birds and Fools"	Harry Morgan	Richard Fielder	April 7, 1974
New Prospect hosts the first flight by two airplane inventors, but a cloud hanging over the celebrated exhibition is Hec's investigation of a mysterious murder. Doc Coogan attempts to heal a family torn asunder by alcoholism. Guest stars: Robert Foxworth, Charles Aidman, Fionnula Flanagan and Katherine Helmond.

== See also ==
- List of The NBC Mystery Movie episodes
