= Laurence Luckinbill =

American actor, playwright and director (born 1934)

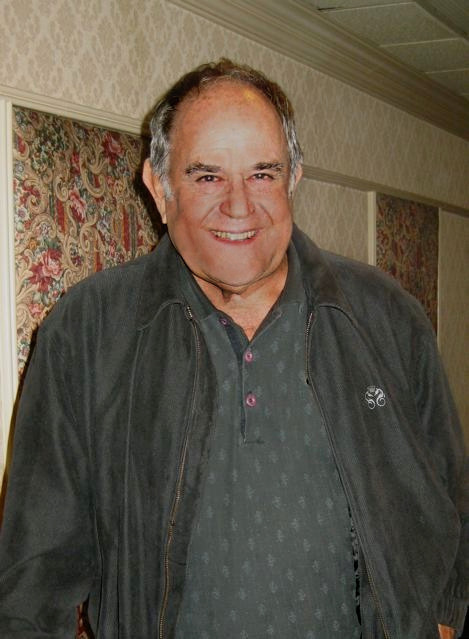
- Luckinbill in 2008
- Born: Laurence George Luckinbill; November 21, 1934 (age 92); Fort Smith, Arkansas, U.S.
- Education: University of Arkansas; Catholic University of America
- Occupations: Actor; playwright; director
- Years active: 1961–present
- Spouses: Robin Strasser (m. 1965; div. 1976) Lucie Arnaz (m. 1980)
- Children: 5
- Relatives: Lana and Lilly Wachowski (nieces)

Laurence George Luckinbill (born November 21, 1934) is an American actor, playwright and director. He has worked in film, television and theatre, doing triple duty in the theatre by writing, directing and starring in stage productions. He is known for penning and starring in one-man shows based upon the lives of U.S. presidents Theodore Roosevelt, and Lyndon B. Johnson, author Ernest Hemingway, and American defense attorney Clarence Darrow, and for his portrayal of Spock's half-brother Sybok in the film Star Trek V: The Final Frontier.

== Personal life ==
Luckinbill was born in Fort Smith, Arkansas, the son of Agnes (née Nulph) and Laurence Benedict Luckinbill. He is the uncle of film directors Lana and Lilly Wachowski, the children of his sister, Lynne. He is Roman Catholic.

He attended Fort Smith Junior College from 1951 to 1952, received a Bachelor of Arts degree from the University of Arkansas in 1956, received a Master of Fine Arts degree from the Catholic University of America in 1958, attended New York University in 1980, and studied acting at HB Studio in New York City.

He is married to actress Lucie Arnaz, daughter of Lucille Ball and Desi Arnaz. They have three children together: Simon, Joseph and Katharine. Arnaz and Luckinbill have toured together in theatrical productions such as They're Playing Our Song. He also has two sons from his previous marriage to actress Robin Strasser, Nicholas and Benjamin.

== Career ==
On television, he started out with roles on the American soap operas Where the Heart Is and The Secret Storm. He starred as espionage agent Glenn Garth Gregory in the 1972–1973 ABC dramatic television series The Delphi Bureau. He has performed in numerous episodes of television series, including Law & Order, Barnaby Jones, Columbo (episode "Make Me a Perfect Murder"), The Mary Tyler Moore Show and Murder, She Wrote. He also played Lillian Hellman's lawyer Joseph L. Rauh in the television film Dash and Lilly (1999).

His 1961 Broadway debut was in A Man for All Seasons. He starred in Pavel Kohout's 1976 Broadway play Poor Murderer at the Ethel Barrymore Theatre, Michael Cristofer's The Shadow Box (1977) at the Morosco Theatre, for which he received a nomination for Best Featured Actor in a Play, and in Thomas Babe's A Prayer for My Daughter (1978) at The Public Theater. His theatre career has included writing and directing. Luckinbill has written and performed in several one-man shows, including, Hemingway, Teddy and An Evening with Clarence Darrow. He has also starred in numerous productions of Lyndon, which he did not write. One production was at the LBJ Museum in Austin, Texas, where Lady Bird Johnson was among attendees.

He appeared in the drama film The Boys in the Band (1970), reprising the role of Hank, which he originated on stage. He portrayed Spock's half-brother Sybok in Star Trek V: The Final Frontier (1989). Sean Connery was originally contacted to star in the role but was busy with Indiana Jones and the Last Crusade. William Shatner discovered Luckinbill by chance by channel-surfing late one night and seeing him perform as Johnson. When Shatner called to offer him the role, Luckinbill accepted immediately.

Other film appearances include Such Good Friends (1971), The Promise (1979) and Cocktail (1988). He also narrated the documentary Moonwalk One (1971). In the early 1970s, Luckinbill was the commercial spokesperson for Trans World Airlines (TWA), appearing in several television commercials for the United States airline.

== Partial filmography ==
Year	Title	Role	Notes
1970	The Boys in the Band	Hank	
1971	Such Good Friends	Richard	
1972–1973	The Delphi Bureau	Glenn Garth Gregory	9 episodes
1972	Corky	Wayne Nesbitt	
1974	Death Sentence	Don Davies	ABC Movie of the Week
1974	Harry O	Father Paul Vecchio	1 episode: Mortal Sin
1974	Panic on the 5:22	Lawrence Lewis	ABC Movie of the Week
1976	The Money	Richard Banks	
1978	Columbo	Mark McAndrews	Season 7, episode 3
1979	The Promise	Dr. Peter Gregson	
1982	One More Try	Adam Margolin	unsold pilot
1984	Not for Publication	Mayor Franklyn	
1988	Cocktail	Mr. Mooney	
1988	Messenger of Death	Homer Foxx	
1989	Star Trek V: The Final Frontier	Sybok	
1999	Crucible of Empire: The Spanish-American War	William McKinley (voice)	Television documentary film
