= Sidney Fine (composer) =

American orchestrator and television composer

- Born: December 25, 1904; Waterbury, Connecticut, U.S.
- Died: May 20, 2002 (aged 97); Burbank, California, U.S.
- Education: University of Connecticut, City College of New York, Yale School of Music
- Occupation(s): Orchestrator, composer
- Years active: 1920's–1999
- Spouse: Rose Mishkin (died 2000)

Sidney Fine (December 25, 1904 – May 20, 2002) was an American orchestrator and composer for film, television, and radio.

== Background ==
Fine was born in Waterbury, Connecticut. A graduate of the University of Connecticut, he also studied as a postgraduate at the City College of New York in Harlem and the Yale School of Music. He started work as a pianist accompanying silent movies, later becoming accompanist to the violin-playing comedian Henny Youngman. In 1937 Fine moved to Los Angeles, where he studied with the composer Arnold Schoenberg.

== Work in radio, film and television ==
Early in his career Fine worked on radio programs featuring Jack Benny, George Burns and Gracie Allen and Dinah Shore as a pianist and arranger. Fine's work in feature films included orchestration on the Irving Berlin musical Blue Skies for Paramount, and Victory Through Air Power, Fun and Fancy Free, Melody Time, and Lady and the Tramp for Disney. Fine also worked on The Mickey Mouse Club television series.

In 1950 Fine moved to New York to provide arrangements for the radio program The Big Show, which was hosted by Tallulah Bankhead. His work as an orchestrator on the television series Medic in 1956 earned him a Primetime Emmy nomination, and the next year he was an orchestrator for the hit Broadway musical The Music Man. Between 1960 and 1971 Fine worked for Universal on television programs such as Wagon Train, Laramie, The Virginian, Alcoa Premiere, Tammy and The Bold Ones.

Fine's last known work was a song titled "Seeing Voices", recorded by Michael Jackson in 1999. The song, celebrating sign language, was a tribute to Fine's son, who lost his hearing and died of a brain disease in 1975.

== Death ==
Fine died in May 2002 of pneumonia at the Providence Saint Joseph Medical Center in Burbank, California, at the age of 97. His wife Rose, to whom he was married for 74 years had died in June 2000.
