= Wheel series =

Genre of television series

A wheel series, wheel show, wheel format or umbrella series is a television series in which two or more regular programs are rotated in the same time slot. Sometimes the wheel series is given its own umbrella title and promoted as a unit instead of promoting its separate components.

The most successful example of a wheel series on American television was the NBC Mystery Movie, which debuted in 1971 on NBC and ran for seven seasons. Three of the shows in the rotation, Columbo, McCloud, and McMillan & Wife, were among the most successful shows on American television in the 1970s.

== History ==
The concept debuted in 1955 with ABC's Warner Bros. Presents. Warner Bros. Presents was a one-hour show rotating three series based on the movies King's Row, Casablanca, and Cheyenne, with the last 10 minutes set aside for the segment, Behind The Cameras at Warner Brothers. Warner Bros. was inspired by the Disneyland anthology series to do the series for publicity. The series lasted for one season.

In 1959, ITV in the United Kingdom introduced The Four Just Men, a 39 episode series linking the common purpose of four characters: Jeff Ryder (Richard Conte), Tim Collier (Dan Dailey), Ben Manfred (Jack Hawkins) and Ricco Poccari (Vittorio De Sica). Each episode (after the first) featured a different principal but frequently included one or more of the others.

In ABC's 77 Sunset Strip (1958–64) the two detectives would typically alternate as leads, with a Stuart Bailey case being featured one week, and a Jeff Spencer case the next.

In NBC's 90 Bristol Court (1964–65), three unrelated comedy programs set in the same place were shown consecutively in one evening. They were tied together by a single character, handyman Cliff Murdoch (Guy Raymond).

NBC began working with the mystery crime drama wheel format in 1968 with the 90-minute The Name of the Game. Based on the successful 1966 telefilm, Fame Is the Name of the Game, the first of the long-running World Premiere Movie series, it featured three main characters who worked for the same media corporation in different capacities, each character serving as a springboard for a different type of story.

NBC launched a wheel show each year for the subsequent three years: The Bold Ones, Four in One and The NBC Mystery Movie. McCloud became part of the foundation for the NBC Mystery Movie after the cancellation of Four in One. It was joined by two new shows, Columbo (derived from the 1968 NBC telefilm Prescription: Murder) and McMillan & Wife. The success of this wheel on Sunday nights eventually led to a sister wheel show airing on Wednesday nights; the original was retitled NBC Sunday Mystery Movie with the addition of a fourth program, Hec Ramsey, and the new wheel, NBC Wednesday Mystery Movie debuted with four other new programs. None of the newer programs were as successful as the original three Sunday shows, except for the Wednesday program, Quincy, M.E., which was spun off as a standalone hour-long series in 1977. Rival programs ABC's The Men, and The New CBS Tuesday Night Movies did not last long either.

Attempts at reviving the format were made in 1989 with the Mystery Wheel of Adventure, a series of made-for-syndication TV movies including six installments of a new version of The Saint, in 1989-1990, with a format that rotated new editions of Columbo and Kojak on ABC, and in 1993–1994 on NBC, with a format that rotated A Perry Mason Mystery and new installments of Hart to Hart, without lasting success.

Hallmark Channel had success with its Mystery Movie wheel from 2005 to 2008, discontinuing the series amid the growing popularity of its original romance movies. In 2015, its newly-rebranded sister channel Hallmark Movies & Mysteries launched a new mystery wheel.

== List of wheel series ==
=== NBC ===
- The Name of the Game (1968–1971)
- The Bold Ones (1969–1973)
- Four in One (1970–1971)
- The NBC Mystery Movie / NBC Sunday Mystery Movie (1971–1977)
- NBC Wednesday Mystery Movie / NBC Tuesday Mystery Movie (1971–1974)
- Search (1972–1973)
- The NBC Friday Night Mystery (1993–1994)

=== ABC ===
- Warner Bros. Presents (1955–1956)
- The Men (1972)
- The Hardy Boys/Nancy Drew Mysteries (January 1977–February 1978). This wheel included The Brady Bunch Hour (January 23–February 27, 1977). The two remaining shows were combined, but later the Drew character was dropped.
- The ABC Mystery Movie (1989–1990), later split into the ABC Monday Mystery Movie (February 6–May 1989) and ABC Saturday Mystery Movie (August 1989–August 1990)

=== CBS ===
- The New CBS Tuesday Night Movies (1973) rotating two series with made-for-TV films

=== Hallmark Channel ===
- Hallmark Channel Mystery Wheel (2005–2008)

=== Hallmark Movies & Mysteries ===
- Mystery Wheel (2015–present)

=== Syndication ===
- Fred Flintstone and Friends (1977–1978)
- Hanna–Barbera's World of Super Adventure (1978–1979)
- The Comic Strip (1987–88)
- Action Pack (1994–1995) initially a wheel series of telefilms before becoming a programming block of action series
- Mystery Wheel of Adventure (1989–1990) six The Saint telefilms along with three telemovies featuring Dick Francis's detective David Cleveland
