= Kevin Tighe filmography =

Kevin Tighe (b. Jon Kevin Fishburn; August 13, 1944) is an American actor who has worked in television, film, and theatre since the late 1960s. He attended University of Southern California where he earned a Master of Fine Arts in acting. Tighe earned a role in The Graduate starring Dustin Hoffman and then served in the U.S. Army. Following his military service, he returned to acting, working under contract for Paramount Pictures. In 1971 he signed a contract with Universal Studios and got the part of Fireman Roy DeSoto on the NBC series Emergency! (1972–77). He has made many guest appearances in TV shows such as Ellery Queen, Cos, and The Hardy Boys/Nancy Drew Mysteries. Tighe's film credits include Road House, What's Eating Gilbert Grape, and Jade. Tighe won a Genie Award for best supporting actor in 1994 for I Love a Man in Uniform. In the 2000s he played Anthony Cooper, the father of John Locke, on the ABC series Lost.

== Filmography ==
=== Film ===
Feature film acting roles
Year(s)	Title	Role	Notes
1967	Narcotics: Pit of Despair	John Scott	Short
1967	The Graduate	Extra	Uncredited
1968	Yours, Mine and Ours	Extra	Uncredited
1987	Matewan	Hickey	
1988	Eight Men Out	Joseph 'Sport' Sullivan	
1989	K-9	Lyman	
1989	Lost Angels	Dr. Gaeyl	
1989	Road House	Frank Tilghman	
1990	Another 48 Hrs.	Lieutenant Blake Wilson	
1990	Bright Angel	The Man	
1991	City of Hope	O'Brien	
1992	Newsies	Snyder	
1992	School Ties	Coach McDevitt	
1993	I Love a Man in Uniform	Frank	AKA A Man in Uniform; Tighe won a Genie Award for best supporting actor in 1994 for this film
1993	What's Eating Gilbert Grape	Ken Carver	
1993	Geronimo: An American Legend	Brigadier General Nelson Miles	
1994	Double Cross	Brian Cody	
1994	Men of War	Colonel Merrick	
1995	Jade	Captain Arnold Clifford	
1995	The Ticket	Mr. Kessler	Short
1996	Race the Sun	Jack Fryman	
1996	Scorpion Spring	California County Sheriff Rawley Gill	
1999	The Wetonkawa Flash	Unknown	
1999	Mumford	Mr. Crisp	
2001	The Big Day	Joe	
2003	Fast Food High	Dave Richter	
2003	The Tulse Luper Suitcases, Part 1: The Moab Story	William Gottschalk	
2003	The Tulse Luper Suitcases: Antwerp	William Gottschalk	
2005	Hello	Donald	Short
2005	The Deal	John Cortland	
2005	Today You Die	Max Stevens	
2005	A Life in Suitcases	William Gottschalk	
2009	My Bloody Valentine	Ben Foley	
2013	I am I	Gene	
2025	One Battle After Another	Roy More	

=== Television ===
Television acting roles
Year(s)	Title	Role	Notes
1970	Bonanza	Krulak	Episode: "The Weary Willies" (season 12, episode 3)
1972	Adam-12	Roy DeSoto	Episode: "Lost and Found" (season 5, episode 4)
1972	The Wedsworth-Townsend Act	Firefighter Paramedic Roy DeSoto	2-hour pilot movie for the series Emergency!
1972–1979	Emergency!	Firefighter Paramedic Roy DeSoto, L.A. County FD Squad 51	129 episodes and six 2-hour television movies See also: List of Emergency! episodes: Also as director: "Inventions" (1974) (season 3, episode 22), "Gossip" (1974) (season 4, episode 3), "Equipment" (1975) (season 5, episode 4), "Fair Fight" (1976) (season 6, episode 5); Also as writer: "All Night Long" (1977) (season 6, episode 21)
1973–1974	Emergency +4	Firefighter Paramedic Roy DeSoto (voice only)	23 episodes
1973	Starship Rescue	Himself	Special preview for NBC's Saturday morning line up
1974	Go!	Himself	Episode: "September 7, 1974"
1974	The Six Million Dollar Man	Root	Episode: "The Last of the Fourth of Julys" (series 1, episode 10)
1974	Sierra	Fireman Roy DeSoto	Episode: "The Urban Rangers" (season 1, episode 5)
1975	Dinah!	Himself	Season 2, episode 73 (December 26, 1975)
1975	The Hollywood Squares	Himself	Episode dated 6 October 1975
1976	Ellery Queen	Detective Jim Millay	Episode: "The Adventure of Caesar's Last Sleep" (season 1, episode 20)
1976	Cos	Neighbor	Episode dated 10 October 1976
1976	The Rich Little Show	Himself	Season 1, episode 5 (March 1, 1976)
1976	Battle of the Network Stars	Himself	TV special
1978	The Hardy Boys/Nancy Drew Mysteries	Steve	2 episodes: "The Last Kiss of Summer Part 1", "The Last Kiss of Summer Part 2 (season 3, episode 1-2)
1979	The Rebels	Thomas Jefferson	Television movie
1980	The Love Boat	Chris	Episode: "Dumb Luck/Tres Amigos/Hey, Jealous Lover" (season 3, episode 24)
1981	CBS Library	Unknown	Episode: "Orphans, Waifs and Wards"
1986	Good Morning America	Himself	Episode dated July 9, 1986
1987	CBS Summer Playhouse	Inspector John Fernack	Episode: "The Saint in Manhattan"(season 1, episode 1)
1990	Murder, She Wrote	Lieutenant Moynihan	Episode: "How to Make a Killing Without Really Trying" (season 6, episode 14)
1990	Tales from the Crypt	Sam Forney	Episode: "Cutting Cards" (season 2, episode 3)
1990	Perry Mason: The Case of the Defiant Daughter	Steven Elliott	Television movie
1991	Face of a Stranger	Richard	Television movie
1992	Yesterday Today	Mike	Television movie
1993	Better Off Dead	District Attorney John Byron	Television movie
1993	Caught in the Act	Detective	Television movie
1994	Betrayal of Trust	Bill Carroll	Television movie
1994	Under Suspicion	Bob Phillips	Episode: "Wife Abuse/Murder: Part 2" (season 1, episode 6)
1995	The Avenging Angel	Benjamin Rigby	Television movie
1995	Escape to Witch Mountain	Sheriff Bronson	Television movie
1995	Murder One	David Blalock	6 episodes (season 1, episodes 1-6)
1995	Chicago Hope	Harry Kincaid	Episode: "Christmas Truce" (season 2, episode 11)
1996	The Single Guy	Jack Blake	Episode: "Rival" (season 1, episode 14)
1996	In Cold Blood	Herbert Clutter	Television movie
1997	ER	Sergeant Pete Mattimore	Episode: "Fortune's Fools" (season 3, episode 13)
1997	The 119	Battalion Chief Kieran Ryan	Television movie
1998	The Outer Limits	General	Episode: "Final Exam" (season 4, episode 16)
1998	Winchell	William Randolph Hearst	Television movie
1999	The Darwin Conspiracy	Alan Hollingsworth	Television movie
1999	Star Trek: Voyager	Henry Janeway	Episode: "11:59" (season 5, episode 23)
1999–2000	Freaks and Geeks	Mr. Andopolis	2 episodes: "I'm with the Band", "Smooching and Mooching" (season 1, episodes 6, 16)
2000	Family Law	Unknown	Episode: "Metamorphosis" (season 1, episode 17)
2000	The Sight	Jake	Television movie
2001	The West Wing	Governor Jack Buckland, D-IN	Episode: "On the Day Before" (season 3, episode 5)
2002	Rose Red	Victor Kandinsky	Television mini-series; 3 episodes
2002	Strange World	Jack Cullum	Episode: "The Devil Still Holds My Hand" (season 1, episode 6)
2002	Nancy Drew	Coach Jeffries	Television movie
2003	Everwood	Joe Morris	Episode: "Episode 20" (season 1, episode 21)
2004	Law & Order: Criminal Intent	Dr. Edwin Lindgard	Episode: "D.A.W." (season 3, episode 20)
2005–2010	Lost	Anthony Cooper	6 episodes: "Deus Ex Machina" (season 1, episode 19), "Orientation" (2005) (season 2, episode 3), "Lockdown" (2006) (season 2, episode 17), "The Man from Tallahassee" (2007) (season 3, episode 13), "The Brig" (2007) (season 3, episode 19), "The Candidate" (2010) (season 6, episode 14)
2007	The 4400	Senator Lenhoff	2 episodes: "The Truth and Nothing But the Truth" (season 4, episode 4), "Till We Have Built Jerusalem" (season 4, episode 7)
2007	Law & Order: Special Victims Unit	Julian Cooper	Episode: "Avatar" (season 9, episode 2)
2008	Numb3rs	Keith Watts	Episode: "Charlie Don't Surf" (season 5, episode 7)
2009	Leverage	Ian Blackpoole	2 episodes: "The First David Job" (season 1, episode 12), "The Second David Job"(season 1, episode 13)
2009	Lie to Me	Fletcher Bellwood	Episode: "Undercover" (season 1, episode 11)
2010	Trauma	Captain Cal Channing	Episode: "13" (season 1, episode 13)
2012	Common Law	Fred Bendek	Episode: "In-Laws vs. Outlaws" (season 1, episode 10)
2012	The Mountain Runners	Himself (Narrator)	Documentary
2013	America on Stage	Himself	Documentary
2013	Independent Lens	Himself	Episode: "Playwright: From Page to Stage" (season 15, episode 5)
2014	Salem	Giles Corey	Episode: "The Vow" (season 1, episode 1)
2015	Complications	Gary Ellison	5 episodes: "Pilot" (season 1, episode 1), "Onset" (season 1, episode 3), "Diagnosis" (season 1, episode 6), "Deterioration" (season 1, episode 9), "Critical Condition" (season 1, episode 10)
2016	Law & Order: Special Victims Unit	Gregory Searle	Episode: "Sheltered Outcasts" (season 17, episode 19)
