= Randolph Mantooth filmography =

Randolph Mantooth was a graduate of the American Academy of Dramatic Arts, Mantooth has been a working actor in television, documentaries, theatre, and film for more than 40 years. He was discovered in New York by a Universal Studios talent agent while performing the lead in the play Philadelphia, Here I Come. After signing with Universal and moving to California, he slowly built up his resume with work on such dramatic series as Adam-12 (1968), Marcus Welby, M.D. (1969), McCloud (1970), and Alias Smith and Jones (1971).

He was chosen to play a lead role as Fireman/Paramedic John Gage in the 1970s medical drama, Emergency!, a show that enjoyed six seasons (129 episodes) and seven two-hour television movie specials. Since this experience, Mantooth has spoken regularly at Firefighter and EMS conferences and symposiums across the United States, while maintaining an active acting career. He is a spokesperson for both the International Association of Firefighters [IAFF] and the International Association of Fire Chiefs [IAFC] for fire fighter health and safety, and he has been honored over the years with numerous awards and recognitions.

Mantooth has appeared in numerous films and television series in lead and supportive roles including mini-series adaptations of Testimony of Two Men (1977) and a starring role as Abraham Kent in The Seekers (1979–80). Through the 1990s and 2000s he explored a new direction in his career with daytime soap operas, earning him four Soap Opera Digest Award nominations. He has frequently returned to his theater roots in such productions as "Footprints in Blood", "Back to the Blankets", "Wink Dah", "The Independence of Eddie Rose", "The Paper Crown", "The Inuit" and "Rain Dance", among others.

== Filmography ==
=== Television ===
Television acting roles
Year(s)	Title	Role	Description
1970	Matt Lincoln	Paul	1 episode of television series: "Angie" (series 1, episode 9)
1970	The Bold Ones: The Senator	Lt. Tony Caffey	2 episodes of television series: "A Continual Roar of Musketry: Part 1" (season 1, episode 4); "A Continual Roar of Musketry: Part 2" (season 1, episode 5)
1970	McCloud	Intern (season 1) Phillip Yerby (season 2)	2 episodes of television series: "Who Says You Can't Make Friends in New York City?" (1970) (season 1, episode 1); "The Disposal Man" (1971) (season 2, episode 4)
1971	The Virginian	Lt. Dorn	1 episode of television series: "The Regimental Line" (season 9, episode 21)
1971	Vanished	Ensign	2-part television movie: Crime/Drama/Mystery
1971	Alias Smith and Jones	Dan Loomis	1 episode of television series: "Stagecoach Seven" (season 1, episode 9)
1971	Rod Serling's Night Gallery	Ekins	1 episode of television series: Segment: "Class of '99"
1971	Marriage: Year One	Dan	Television movie: Drama/Comedy
1971	The Bold Ones: The Lawyers	Terence "Terry" Kimble	1 episode of television series: "The Strange Secret of Yermo Hill" (season 3, episode 2)
1971	Sarge	Finch	2 episodes of television series: "The Combatants" (season 1, episode 10); "The Badge or the Cross" (season 1, episode 0)
1971	Marcus Welby, M.D. (1971 & 1972)	Intern (season 2) Actor (season 3)	2 episodes of television series: "Cynthia" (1971) (season 2, episode 19); "Solomon's Choice" (1972) (season 3, episode 25)
1971	Adam-12 (1971 & 1972)	Neil Williams (season 3) John Gage (season 5)	2 episodes of television series: "Log 88 - Reason to Run" (1971) (season 3, episode 25); "Lost and Found" (1972) (season 5, episode 4)
1971	Owen Marshall: Counselor at Law (1971 & 1974)	Lonnie Roth (season 1) Keith Ryder (season 3)	2 episodes of television series: "Until Proven Innocent" (1971) (season 1, episode 12); "The Desertion of Keith Ryder" (1974) (season 3, episode 22)
1972	The Bravos	2nd Lt.Lewis	Television movie: Western
1972-1979	The Wedsworth-Townsend Act	Firefighter/Paramedic; John Gage	2-hour Pilot movie for the series Emergency!.
1972-1979	Emergency! (1972–1977)	Firefighter/Paramedic; John Gage; LACoFD	129 episodes of television series: See also: List of Emergency! episodes: Also as Director: "The Nuisance" (1976) (season 5, episode 24); "Insanity Epidemic" (1977) (season 6, episode 14)
1972-1979	Emergency! (1978–1979) (Six 2-hour television movies)	Firefighter/Paramedic; John Gage; LACoFD	Six 2-hour television movies: See also: List of Emergency! episodes: The Steel Inferno (January 7, 1978); Survival on Charter #220 (March 28, 1978); Most Deadly Passage (April 4, 1978); Greatest Rescues of Emergency (December 31, 1978) (also as Director); What's a Nice Girl Like You Doing (June 26, 1979); The Convention (July 3, 1979)
1972-1979	Emergency +4 (1973–1974)	Firefighter/Paramedic; John Gage (voice only)	23 episodes of television series: Adventure animation
1973	Starship Rescue	Himself	Special: Previews for NBC's Saturday morning line up with Emergency!+4 and Star Trek: The Animated Series
1974	Go!	Himself	1 episode of a children's program: September 7, 1974 showing what firefighters and paramedics do
1974	Sierra	Paramedic John Gage	1 episode of television series: "The Urban Rangers" (season 1, episode 5)
1975 & 1976	Dinah!	Himself	2 episodes of talk show: Season 2, episode 73 (December 26, 1975); Season 2, episode 196(July 28, 1976)
1976	The Rich Little Show	Himself	1 episode of a comedy series: Season 1, episode 5 (March 1, 1976)
1976	Cos	Mailman	1 episode of television series: "New Family / Traffic Rules" Episode dated October 10, 1976
1977	Testimony of Two Men	Father Frank McNulty	Television mini-series: Unknown episodes
1978	Project U.F.O.	Tim Jenkins	1 episode of television series: "Sighting 4016: The Pipeline Incident" (season 2, episode 2)
1978 & 1979	Operation Petticoat	Lt. Mike Bender	10 episodes of television series: "Operation Spleen" (Season 2, episode 1); "The Hunkle-Crandall Affair" (Season 2, episode 2); "Cram Course" (Season 2, episode 3); "You Owe Me One" (Season 2, episode 4); "Don't Drink the Shimbaka!" (Season 2, episode 5); "The Talent Show" (Season 2, episode 6); "Sub-Down" (Season 2, episode 7); "Hail to the Chief" (Season 2, episode 8); "Big Deal on Kaloa Street" (Season 2, episode 9); "Matters of Honor(Season 2, episode 10)
1978 & 1979	Detective School	Eddie Dawkins	11 episodes of television series: "A Bier on the House" (Season 1, episode 1); "Oh, How We Danced" (Season 1, episode 2); "Lucy in the Sky with Pizza" (Season 1, episode 3); "Hooray for Bulgaria" (Season 1, episode 4); "The Runaway!" (Season 1, episode 5); "The Jewel Heist" (Season 1, episode 6); "One Word Is Worth a Thousand Pictures" (Season 1, episode 7); "Masseuse in the Cold, Cold Ground" (Season 1, episode 8); "The Killer-Diller Lingerie Caper" (Season 1, episode 9); "Farewell, My Miss Glendale" (Season 1, episode 10); "The Bank Job" (series 1, episode 11)
1978 & 1981	Vega$	Bobby Howard (season 1) Todd Peterson (season 3)	2 episodes of television series: "Serve, Volley and Kill" (1978) (season 1, episode 11); "French Twist" (1981) (season 3, episode 21)
1979	The Love Boat	Alan Billingsley	1 episode of television series: "Second Chance/Don't Push Me/Like Father, Like Son" (season 2, episode 17)
1979	Battlestar Galactica	Michael	1 episode of television series: "Greetings from Earth" (season 1, episode 19) – also featured his younger brother Donald Mantooth
1979	The Seekers	Abraham Kent	Television movie: Drama/History
1980	Charlie's Angels	Mark Williams	1 episode of television series: "Island Angels" (season 5, episode 4)
1980	Aloha Paradise	Guest	1 episode of television series: "The Star/The Trouble with Chester/Fran´s Worst Friend" (season 1, episode 2)
1981	Insight	Adam	1 episode of television series: "The Sixth Day"
1981	Fantasy Island	Dr. Paul Todd (season 4)	1 episode of television series: "Delphine/The Unkillable" (1981) (season 4, episode 20)
1983 thru 1986	The Fall Guy	Larry (as Randy Mantooth) (season 3) Veckler (season 4) Jerry Andrews (season 5)	3 episodes of television series: "To the Finish" (1983) (season 3, episode 11); "The Winner" (1984) (season 4, episode 12); "To Lucky Stiff" (1986) (season 5, episode 14)
1984	Dallas	Joe Don Ford	1 episode of television series: "Jamie" (season 8, episode 4)
1984	Foul-up, Bleeps, and Blunders	Himself	1 episode of television show: Presented Emergency! bloopers
1985	The Star Games	Himself (as Randy Mantooth)	1 episode of television series: "Emergency!/It's a Living/Roots/Paper Chase"
1985	Scene of the Crime	Guest	1 episode of television series: "The Memory Game" (season 1, episode 1)
1985	Terror at London Bridge, aka Bridge Across Time	Joe Nez	Television movie: Horror
1985	Murder, She Wrote	Raymond Two Crows/ DeMarco	1 episode of television series: "Murder Digs Deep" (season 2, episode 11)
1986	Good Morning America	Himself	1 episode of a talk show: Episode dated July 9, 1986
1987-1990, 1993-1995, & 1995-1997	Loving & The City	Clay Alden/ Alex Masters	Recurring role in television series: (1990) Nominated Soap Opera Digest Award - Outstanding Hero: Daytime (Loving); (1995) Nominated Soap Opera Digest Award - Outstanding Supporting Actor (Loving); (1996) Nominated Soap Opera Digest Award - Outstanding Male Scene Stealer (Loving); (1997) Nominated Soap Opera Digest Award - Outstanding Supporting Actor (The City)
1988	L.A. Law	Gil Tecowsky	1 episode of television series: "The Princess and the Pee" (season 3, episode 5)
1991	White Cobra Express		Television movie: Drama
1991	Before the Storm	Bing Tupper	Television movie: Drama
1991	Under Cover	Bing Tupper	1 episode of television series: "Sacrifices" (season 1, episode 3)
1991	China Beach	Joaquin	1 episode of television series: "100 Klicks Out" (season 4, episode 11)
1991	MacGyver	Earl Stringer	1 episode of television series: "The Prometheus Syndrome" (season 7, episode 4)
1992	CBS Schoolbreak Special	Mr. Leland	1 episode of television series: "Please, God, I'm Only Seventeen" (season 9, episode 4)
1992	Baywatch	Sam Dietz	1 episode of television series: "Dead of Summer" (season 3, episode 11)
1992-1993	General Hospital	Richard Halifax	Recurring role of television series: Daytime drama
1995	The 11th Annual Soap Opera Digest Awards	Himself/Presenter	Presenter (February 17, 1995)
1996	The West	Himself (voice) (cameo appearance)	1 episode of a PBS four-video documentary series: "The People" (season 1, episode 1)
1996	The Rosie O'Donnell Show	Himself	Guest on one episode of a syndicated talk show
1997	One Life to Live	Alex Masters	1 episode of television series: Crossover storyline between The City & One Life to Live
1997	Diagnosis Murder	Mayor Bill Tremont	1 episode of television series: "Malibu Fire" (season 5, episode 3)
1997	JAG	Col. Ron Barret	1 episode of television series: "Impact" (season 3, episode 9)
1997	Walker, Texas Ranger	James Lee Crown	1 episode of television series: "Rainbow's End" (season 6, episode 10)
1998	Promised Land	Ben Camden	1 episode of television series: "When Darkness Falls"
1999	Diagnosis Murder	Himself (cameo appearance)	1 episode of television series: "Trash TV" (season 6, episode 19)
2000	ER	Policeman	1 episode of television series: "May Day" (season 6, episode 22)
2000	Bitter Suite (original title Time Share)	Ken Crandall	Television movie: Action/drama
2000	Ultimate Fan Search	Himself	TVLand Game Show: Provided a video question and answer
2000	VH-1 Where Are They Now?	Himself	TV series/documentary/biography: Episode dated October 21, 2000
2002	Street Smarts	Himself	Syndicated Game show: Classic TV Week
2003	VH-1 Where Are They Now: TV Hunks	Himself	TV movie documentary short: Episode dated June 30, 2003
2003-2005	As the World Turns	Harold 'Hal' Todd; Munson Jr.	30 episodes of television series: Daytime drama
2004	The Hollywood Squares	Himself	Gameshow: TV Doctors Week (season 6, episode 96) February 9, 2004
2007	One Life to Live	Kirk Harmon	11 episodes of television series: Daytime drama
2007	Fire Serpent	Dutch Fallon	Television movie: Drama
2009	Criminal Minds	Mr. Patrick Gless	1 episode of television series: "Cold Comfort" (season 4, episode 14)
2009	Entertainment Tonight	Himself	TV series: Episode dated February 10, 2009
2010	Ghost Whisperer	Allen Farber	1 episode of television series: "Dead Ringer" (season 5, episode 21)
2010	Hometown Glory	Himself (Special Thanks)	Documentary/Action/Biography
2011	Sons of Anarchy	Charlie Horse	2 episodes of television series: "Out" (1978) (season 4, episode 1); "Dorylus" (1981) (season 4, episode 3)

=== Film ===
Feature film acting roles
Year(s)	Title	Role	Description
1999	Enemy Action	Solonsky	Feature film: Action/drama
2000	Agent Red	Admiral Edwards	Feature film: Action
2006	Price to Pay	Bert	Feature film: Drama
2007	He Was a Quiet Man	Dr. Willis	Feature film: Comedy/drama
2007	On the Revolutions of Heavenly Spheres	Arthur Mayler	Film short: Short/drama
2008	Flowers and Weeds	Roger Lonergan	Film short: Short/drama
2009	Scream of the Bikini	Ambassador Cartwright	Feature film: Comedy
2010	Bold Native	Richard Cranehill	Feature film: Action/adventure/comedy
2013	Killer Holiday	Detective Bodrogi	Feature film: Horror/thriller
2014	Actor? A Documentary	Himself	Documentary

== Theatre ==
Mantooth has frequently returned to his theatre roots in such productions as Footprints in Blood, Back to the Blankets, Wink Dah, The Independence of Eddie Rose, The Paper Crown, The Inuit and Rain Dance (off-Broadway), among others. Since 2003, Mantooth has been an Associate Artist of The Purple Rose Theatre Company in Chelsea, Michigan, founded by Jeff Daniels, completing a three-month run of Superior Donuts in 2012.
