= Kevin Tighe =

American actor (born 1944)

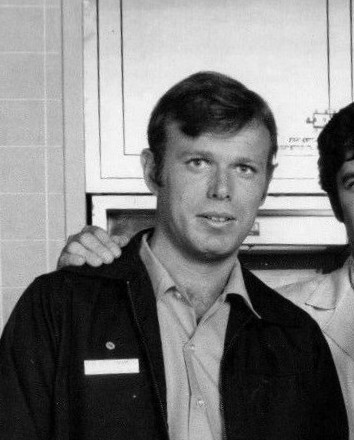
- Tighe in cast photo from Emergency!, 1973
- Born: Jon Kevin Fishburn; August 13, 1944 (age 82); Los Angeles, California, U.S.
- Education: Pasadena High School
- Alma mater: University of Southern California (MFA)
- Occupation: Actor
- Years active: 1967–present
- Known for: Emergency!; Road House; What's Eating Gilbert Grape
- Spouses: Mary Lou Seaman (divorced); Rebecca Fletcher
- Children: 1

Kevin Tighe (/taɪɡ/; born Jon Kevin Fishburn; August 13, 1944) is an American actor who has worked in television, film, and theater since the late 1960s. He is best known for portraying firefighter-paramedic Roy DeSoto, on the 1972–1977 NBC series Emergency!

Tighe was cast in his first major film as an extra in 1967's The Graduate. After being under contract with Paramount and Universal, Tighe's career took a turn from bit parts and extra work when he was cast as Roy DeSoto on Emergency! Following Emergency!, Tighe went on to make numerous guest appearances in television shows such as Ellery Queen, Cos, The Hardy Boys/Nancy Drew Mysteries, and The Six Million Dollar Man.

Aside from The Graduate, some of Tighe's film credits include Road House, City of Hope, What's Eating Gilbert Grape, and Jade. Tighe won a 1994 Genie Award for Best Supporting Actor in I Love a Man in Uniform. In the 2000s he played Anthony Cooper on the ABC television series Lost, as well as Giles Corey in the premiere episode of the original WGN America series Salem. In 2025, he had a brief role in the Paul Thomas Anderson action-thriller film One Battle After Another.

Tighe has also been seen in a number of stage productions, including A Reckoning, Mourning Becomes Electra, Anna Christie, Other Desert Cities, and Curse of the Starving Class.

== Early life and education ==
Tighe was born on August 13, 1944, as Jon Kevin Fishburn in Los Angeles, California, of Czech-Bohemian and Irish descent, the son of an actor.

When he was five, Tighe moved with his family from Los Angeles to nearby Pasadena, where he began acting at an early age, auditioning for juvenile leads at the Pasadena Playhouse. He graduated from Pasadena High School in 1962, and went on to attend Pasadena City College and CSULA where he was a member of Beta Chi fraternity, before receiving a Bachelor's degree from USC and then an MFA for acting in 1967. After USC, Tighe was drafted into the United States Army. Due to an injury to his finger, he was stationed for two years at Fort Knox rather than being sent to Vietnam.

== Career ==
=== 1960s ===
Tighe's first film appearance was in 1967 as a fraternity brother in The Graduate (only the back of his head is seen, while taking a shower), after which he appeared in two other films: Narcotics: Pit of Despair and Yours, Mine and Ours. After being discharged from the Army, Tighe appeared at the Taper Theater in Los Angeles in The Trial of the Catonsville Nine and in Noël Coward's Design for Living at the Ahmanson Theatre, also in Los Angeles. After this, he went on to perform in Design for Living with the National Theatre of Great Britain. During this period Tighe worked with a number of well-known actors including Lorne Greene, Maggie Smith, and Michael Landon before signing a contract with Universal Studios. During Tighe's tenure at Paramount, he appeared on NBC's Bonanza in the episode, "The Weary Willies".

=== 1970s and 1980s ===
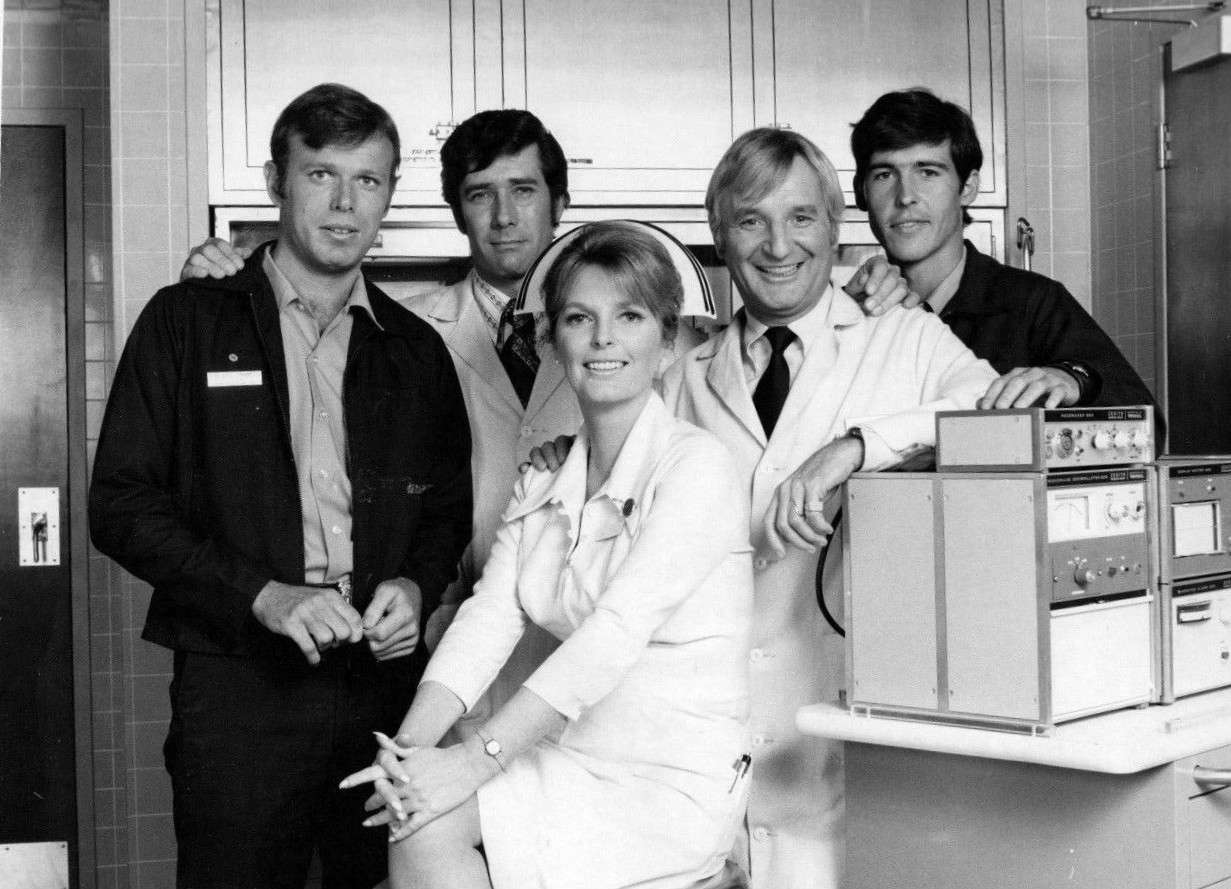
Cast of TV's Emergency! (1973), L-R: Kevin Tighe, Robert Fuller, Julie London, Bobby Troup and Randolph Mantooth

==== Emergency! (1970s) ====
Tighe auditioned for a new Jack Webb television series, Emergency! in 1972 and landed the role of firefighter-paramedic Roy DeSoto, alongside Randolph Mantooth as his partner, John Gage. DeSoto and his team would respond to vehicle crashes, medical emergencies, and other rescues in a fire department rescue squad. After receiving advice and treatment orders from a local hospital via radiotelephone, the medics performed advanced life support techniques to stabilize patients needing aid before having them transported to a medical facility.

In order to better portray his character, Tighe, along with other actors on the show, sat in on paramedic classes and participated in "ride-alongs" with the LA County Fire Department. When the show premiered, there were only 12 fire departments or ambulance services in North America fielding paramedics; the show is credited with introducing its audience to the concept of pre-hospital care, fire prevention, and CPR. In a 2006 Seattle radio interview, Tighe stated that Emergency! "...resonated with working people and I was always very proud of that fact. It promoted the paramedic program."

The show ran six seasons (129 episodes) with seven two-hour television movie specials including a pilot film, The Wedsworth-Townsend Act and averaged 30 million viewers each week. Tighe directed four episodes of Emergency!: "Gossip" (1974), "Inventions" (1974), "Equipment" (1975), and "Fair Fight" (1977). and wrote one episode for the show, "Up all Night" (1977). Tighe and Mantooth did many of their own stunts in the early years of the show. Mantooth has been quoted as saying, "If you could see our faces, it was us doing the stunts, if you couldn't, it was our stunt double."

While on Emergency!, Tighe appeared as Roy DeSoto in episodes of two other shows created by Robert A. Cinader, Sierra which had its backdoor pilot as an Emergency! episode, and Adam-12 (the episode "Lost and Found"). Tighe voiced Roy DeSoto on the animated spin-off Emergency +4 and narrated an episode about the work of paramedics in LA County with Mantooth on NBC's Go!

During the series' run and after it was cancelled, Tighe became and remained friends with Mantooth as well as co-stars Julie London and Bobby Troup. Tighe served as a best man at Mantooth's second wedding in 2002. Through his friendship with Troup and London, who were married to each other as well as being recording artists prior to being cast on the show, Tighe had the opportunity to meet well known jazz musicians and artists.

Both Tighe and Mantooth appear in the video presentation The Pioneers of Paramedicine Story, a project done in conjunction with the Los Angeles County Fire Museum. Originally filmed in 2001 with additional scenes filmed in 2013, the video is a documentation of the history of pre-hospital medicine.

Tighe was an honorary committee member on Project 51 and its efforts to honor Emergency!'s legacy. Tighe conducted interviews and compiled a brief history of American EMS for the project. Roy DeSoto's uniform, along with some of the medical equipment used on the show was inducted into the Smithsonian Institution's National Museum of American History in the Public Services division in May 2000.

Along with Mantooth, Tighe was presented in 2012 with a traditional white leather firefighter helmet by the Los Angeles County Fire Department as Honorary Fire Chief. The honor was bestowed for contributions to the fire service and emergency medicine through educating and inspiring others to work in firefighting and EMS.

==== After Emergency! (1980s) ====
After the cancellation of Emergency!, Tighe continued to work in episodic television, appearing on Ellery Queen, Cos, The Hardy Boys/Nancy Drew Mysteries, The Six Million Dollar Man, and The Love Boat. He also appeared on the CBS Library production of "Orphans, Waifs, and Wards" and as Thomas Jefferson in an adaptation of the John Jakes novel The Rebels in 1979.

During the 80s, Tighe taught drama at USC. To keep his acting skills honed, he once again studied acting, this time with Robert Lewis and Stella Adler in New York City. He worked in summer stock as part of a company directed by Alfred Christie at the Hampton Playhouse in 1980, and performed in Come Blow Your Horn. In 1983, Tighe was cast in Two for the Seesaw at William Putch's Totem Pole Playhouse in Caledonia, Pennsylvania.

Tighe made his Broadway debut at the Music Box Theatre in the play, Open Admissions; the show closed after two weeks. He then acted in The Night of the Iguana with McCarter Theatre Company, in Princeton, NJ; Mark Weller's The Ballad of Soapy Smith in 1983 at the Seattle Repertory Theatre in Seattle; and the New York Shakespeare Festival at the Public Theatre in New York City. In 1989, he received an NEA fellowship at the Seattle Repertory Theatre. Tighe also wrote and directed Homegirl for the Seattle Repertory Theatre in 1986.

After returning to Los Angeles in 1986, Tighe began working again in television and movies. His late 1980s movie appearances were in Matewan, Eight Men Out, K-9, and as club-owner Frank Tilghman in 1989's Road House with Patrick Swayze. During a 2013 interview, Tighe stated, "I've gotten more comments on that movie than any other film I've ever done." Saying he is amazed by the film's broad audience appeal, he further said, "Working class people like it, (college kids), white people, black people. I think a lot of that is due to the music ... the movie had great music."

=== 1990s ===
Tighe's work in the 1990s included work on episodic television crime, drama, and science-fiction programs. Tighe appeared on episodes of Murder, She Wrote, Tales from the Crypt, Under Suspicion, Chicago Hope, The Single Guy, ER, The Outer Limits. For six episodes, he portrayed police detective David Blalock on the crime and legal drama, Murder One. He was a special guest star on Star Trek: Voyager as Henry Janeway, an ancestor of Captain Kathryn Janeway, in the episode "11:59".

Besides episodic work, Tighe appeared in a number of television movies during the 90s, including Perry Mason: The Case of the Defiant Daughter, the remake of Escape to Witch Mountain, and slain Kansas father and farmer Herb Clutter in the 1996 miniseries adaptation of Truman Capote's book In Cold Blood. Tighe also portrayed newspaper legend William Randolph Hearst in Winchell.

Tighe's roles in feature films included lawyers, law enforcement officers, and military figures including the part of Blake Wilson in the Eddie Murphy and Nick Nolte vehicle Another 48 Hrs. Other film roles during this period were in Bright Angel, City of Hope, Newsies, School Ties, and Mumford. Tighe portrayed Ken Carver in What's Eating Gilbert Grape and Brigadier General Nelson Miles in Geronimo: An American Legend. In 1994, he won a Genie Award for Best Supporting Actor in the role of "Frank" in I Love a Man in Uniform.

Tighe continued to work in theater and appeared in three different roles: Hilton Lasker, Swifty, and Lord Kitterson in The End of the Day: An Entertainment at the Seattle Repertory Theatre, in 1989 and 1990. Tighe continued to do plays in the 1990s at the Seattle Repertory Theatre including Hedda Gabler in 1992.

=== 2000s ===
Tighe continued to do episodic work on both cable and network television and appeared on Freaks and Geeks portraying Mr. Andopolis, Family Law, The West Wing portraying Governor of Indiana Jack Buckland, Strange World, Everwood, Law & Order: Criminal Intent, The 4400, and Law & Order: Special Victims Unit. Tighe appeared numerous times on the ABC show Lost as Anthony Cooper, father of John Locke. His work included episodes of Numb3rs, Leverage, and Lie to Me.

His work on television included two movies and mini-series. Tighe appeared in The Sight and Nancy Drew. He also continued to work heavily in film and appeared in The Deal, Today You Die, and My Bloody Valentine. Tighe portrayed William Gottschalk in three of the Tulse Luper films: The Tulse Luper Suitcases, Part 1: The Moab Story, The Tulse Luper Suitcases: Antwerp, and A Life in Suitcases.

Tighe worked in regional and repertory theater, with the bulk of his stage work in Seattle. Tighe played Mick Dowd, a gravedigger, in Martin McDonagh's A Skull in Connemara at ACT Theatre in Seattle in 2000. Six months later, the production moved to New York, where it played at the Roundabout Theatre Company and Gramercy Theatre.

He played Brigadier General Ezra Mannon in Mourning Becomes Electra and the play was initially performed at the ACT Theatre with Jane Alexander in 2001. The play was staged later in 2001 at the Long Wharf Theatre in New Haven, Connecticut with Tighe and Alexander in the cast. Tighe worked with his daughter, Jennifer, in A Reckoning at the Magic Theater in San Francisco. Tighe played Matt in Anna Christie, along with Sam Shepard's Buried Child, and Yuri Lubymov's production of Crime And Punishment on The Arena Stage at the Kreeger Theatre in Washington, D.C.

Tighe played Salter in A Number, exploring the human consequences of cloning, at the ACT Theatre in Seattle. His character examines parent-child relationships in five concentrated scenes through his three cloned sons and the nature of human bonds.

=== 2010 to present ===
Tighe played Captain Channing on Trauma. His recent episodic television work includes Common Law, Complications, and Salem. He appeared in the film I Am I, released in June 2014.

Tighe narrated the documentary The Mountain Runners, examining the mountain marathon runners at Mount Baker in the early 1900s. Tighe was interviewed for America on Stage examining the development of new plays funded by the National Endowment for the Arts. Tighe appeared on a documentary that was aired on the PBS program, Independent Lens. The documentary examined the development and staging of a new play in "Playwright: From Page to Stage".

Tighe played the title role in Rajiv Joseph's Pulitzer Prize-nominated drama Bengal Tiger at the Baghdad Zoo, about the lives of American soldiers who guard a philosophical tiger (Tighe) while on duty in the Iraq War. Tighe played the role in both the New York and at the Mark Taper Forum in Los Angeles productions, replacing Robin Williams, He won positive reviews for his performance of the Tiger. He won a 2010 Garland Award for best Performance in a Play.

Tighe played Fredrik in Anatomy of Pain on the Mirror Stage at the Ethnic Cultural Theatre in Seattle in 2012. In Sam Shepard's Curse of the Starving Class, Tighe played Weston in 2013 at the Long Wharf Theatre in New Haven with Judith Ivey. He had the following thoughts in his approach to doing Shepard's play,"You have to beware of naturalism, which is the place actors tend to go into. You have to leave the ground for awhile and then hope you land." Later in 2013, Tighe played Lyman Wyeth in Other Desert Cities with Pamela Reed at ACT Theatre in Seattle.

In 2025, Tighe appeared in the Paul Thomas Anderson film One Battle After Another.

== Personal life ==
Since 1985, Tighe has resided in Skagit County, Washington with his wife, the artist Rebecca Fletcher.

From Skagit County, he travels to Los Angeles and New York City for work. Tighe has a daughter from his first marriage (to Mary Lou Seaman), Jennifer Tighe, an actress with whom he appeared in the stage production of A Reckoning.

He was diagnosed with Parkinson's disease in 2014, which resulted in his acting hiatus until his appearance in 2025's One Battle After Another. He announced his diagnosis in 2025.

== Filmography ==
=== TV series appearances ===
- Adam-12
- Battle of the Network Stars
- Bonanza
- CBS Library
- CBS Summer Playhouse
- Chicago Hope
- Common Law
- Complications
- Cos
- Dinah! (as himself)
- Emergency!
- Emergency +4
- Ellery Queen
- ER
- Everwood
- Family Law
- Freaks and Geeks
- Go! (as himself)
- Good Morning America (as himself)
- The Nancy Drew/Hardy Boys Mysteries
- Hollywood Squares (as himself)
- Law and Order: Criminal Intent
- Law and Order: SVU
- Leverage
- Lie to Me
- Lost
- Love Boat
- Murder One
- Murder She Wrote
- Nancy Drew
- Numb3rs
- Rich Little Show
- Roadhouse
- Salem
- Sierra
- The Six Million Dollar Man
- Starship Rescue (as himself)
- Star Trek: Voyager
- Strange World
- Tales from the Crypt
- The 4400
- The Outer Limits
- The Single Guy
- The West Wing
- Trauma
- Under Suspicion

=== TV movies ===
- The Wedsworth-Townsend Act (1972; pilot for Emergency!)
  - Plus six 2-hour Emergency! television movies:
    - The Steel Inferno (January 7, 1978)
    - Survival on Charter #220 (March 28, 1978)
    - Most Deadly Passage (April 4, 1978)
    - Greatest Rescues of Emergency (December 31, 1978)
    - What's a Nice Girl Like You Doing (June 26, 1979)
    - The Convention (July 3, 1979)
- The Rebels (1979)
- Perry Mason: The Case of the Defiant Daughter (1990)
- Face of a Stranger (1991)
- Yesterday Today (1992)
- Better Off Dead (1993)
- Caught in the Act (1993)
- Betrayal of Trust (1994)
- Escape to Witch Mountain (1995)
- The Avenging Angel (1995)
- In Cold Blood (1996)
- The 119 (1997)
- Winchell (1998)
- Darwin Conspiracy (1999)
- The Sight (2000)
- Rose Red (mini series; 2002)

=== Feature films ===
- Narcotics: Pit of Despair (film short; 1967)
- Yours, Mine, and Ours uncredited (1968)
- Matewan (1987)
- Eight Men Out (1988)
- Road House (1989)
- Lost Angels (1989)
- K-9 (1989)
- Another 48 Hrs. (1990)
- Bright Angel (1990)
- City of Hope (1991)
- Newsies (1992)
- School Ties (1992)
- I Love a Man in Uniform (1993)
- What's Eating Gilbert Grape (1993)
- Geronimo: An American Legend (1993)
- Men of War (1994)
- Double Cross (1994)
- The Ticket (short) (1995)
- Jade (1995)
- Race the Sun (1996)
- Scorpion Spring (1996)
- The Wetonkawa Flash (1999)
- Mumford (1999)
- The Big Day (2001)
- Fast Food High (2003)
- The Tulse Luper Suitcases: Antwerp (2003)
- The Tulse Luper Suitcases, Part 1: The Moab Story (2003)
- Hello (Film short) (2005)
- The Deal (2005)
- Today You Die (2005)
- A Life in Suitcases (2005)
- My Bloody Valentine (2009)
- I Am I (2014)
- One Battle After Another (2025)

=== Documentaries ===
- The Mountain Runners as narrator (2012)
- America on Stage as himself (2013)
- Independent Lens: "Playwright: From Page to Stage" as himself (2013)
