= I Love a Man in Uniform (film) =

- Directed by: David Wellington
- Written by: David Wellington
- Produced by: Paul Brown; Alexandra Raffe
- Starring: Tom McCamus; Brigitte Bako; Kevin Tighe; Daniel MacIvor; Henry Czerny; Albert Schultz; J. D. Nicholsen; Matthew Ferguson
- Cinematography: David Franco
- Edited by: Susan Shipton
- Music by: Ron Sures; The Tragically Hip
- Production company: Alliance Communications
- Distributed by: IRS Media
- Release date: May 1993
- Running time: 97 mins
- Country: Canada
- Language: English

I Love a Man in Uniform is a 1993 Canadian film, written and directed by David Wellington. A dark psychological drama, it received a score of 60% on Rotten Tomatoes.

== Plot ==
Henry Adler, a bank employee and struggling actor, finally gets his big break when he is cast as a police officer in a television series. When Adler is finally cast in his role as Flanagan on the cop show Crimewave, Adler quits his job as a bank employee and immerses himself into his role. As Adler begins to commit further to his role as Flanagan, he begins to identify too closely with the sense of power and authority that comes with wearing the police uniform.

Adler takes to wearing the police uniform from the set in public, as if he were a real police officer, and gradually loses his grip on reality. He begins to roam the streets of Toronto, acting as though he is a police officer and interacting with citizens as if he is a police officer. This leads to Adler getting in trouble with his boss, who is not impressed that Adler is pretending he is a cop off set, however, this does not bother Adler. He blurs the line between fantasy and reality as he slips further into his fictional reality.

While on the set of Crimewave, Adler falls for Charlie Warner, one of the female actresses on the show. They begin to rehearse their roles together offset, however, Charlie is quickly put off by Adler's quirks and his intensity and cuts Adler off. This sends Adler spiralling, causing him to become sporadic with his actions.

== Cast ==
- Tom McCamus as Henry Adler
- Brigitte Bako as Charlie Warner
- Kevin Tighe as Frank
- Daniel MacIvor as Director
- Henry Czerny as Joseph Riggs
- Albert Schultz as Businessman
- J. D. Nicholsen as Archer
- Matthew Ferguson as Edward Nichols
- Michael Hogan as Detective Itch
- David Hemblen as Father

== Awards ==
McCamus won the Genie Award as Best Actor for his performance. Tighe won the Genie Award for Best Supporting Actor.

== Reception ==
I Love a Man in Uniform opened in 1993, and as of May 30, 2022, has a 60% rating on Rotten Tomatoes.

A review of the movie on Empireonline.com called the film "a hugely impressive and highly compelling first feature guaranteed to please anyone not put off by daft titles and obscure plots"

== Year-end lists ==
- Honorable mention – David Elliott, The San Diego Union-Tribune
