= Emergency +4 =

- Genre: Action Adventure Science fiction cartoon
- Created by: Harold Jack Bloom; R. A. Cinader (live-action basis program)
- Developed by: Fred Calvert Productions
- Presented by: Fred Calvert Productions
- Voices of: Randolph Mantooth; Kevin Tighe
- Theme music composer: Sound Track Music Company
- Country of origin: United States
- Original language: English
- No. of seasons: 2
- No. of episodes: 23

Production
- Producer: Fred Calvert
- Running time: 30 min.
- Production companies: Fred Calvert Productions; Mark VII Limited; Universal Television

Original release
- Network: NBC
- Release: September 8, 1973 – November 30, 1974

Related
- Emergency!

Emergency +4 is a 1973–1974 American animated television series based on the live action prime-time series Emergency!, running concurrently for two seasons.

The Saturday-morning series features two main characters, firefighter-paramedics Johnny Gage and Roy DeSoto, voiced by the actors who played them on the prime-time series, Randolph Mantooth and Kevin Tighe. To appeal to its target audience, it also adds a "plus four" of young people trained in lifesaving techniques—Carol, Matt, Jason, and Randy—along with their pets Flash the dog, Charlemagne the hawk, and Bananas the monkey.

== Broadcast run ==
The series began on NBC's Saturday morning schedule on September 8, 1973, and ran twenty-three 30-minute episodes over two seasons. The final episode aired on November 30, 1974. The show remained on the network until September 4, 1976 through re-runs.

=== Casting ===
Randolph Mantooth and Kevin Tighe provided the character voices for their respective Emergency! paramedic characters of John Roderick Gage and Roy DeSoto. (See below for other character voice providers.)

=== Format ===
Each episode of the adventure series revolved around the Paramedical Rescue Service. The "+4" of the series title referred to the four children who joined the paramedics in each episode's rescue activities.

== Production ==
Universal Studios outsourced the animation to Fred Calvert Productions because, at the time, it did not have its own animation division.

== Cast ==
- Randolph Mantooth as John Gage
- Kevin Tighe as Roy DeSoto
- Donald Fullilove as Jason Phillips
- Peter Haas as Randy Alrich
- Sarah Kennedy as Sally and Carol Harper
- David Jolliffe as Matthew Harper
- Richard Paul (12 episodes, 1974)

== Episodes ==
=== Season 1 (1973) ===
No. overall	No. in season	Title	Directed by	Written by	Original release date
1	1	"Desert Storm"	Fred Calvert	Unknown	8 September 1973
2	2	"Danger at Fantasy Park"	Fred Calvert	Unknown	15 September 1973
3	3	"The Circus Story"	Fred Calvert	Unknown	22 September 1973
4	4	"Sunken Plane"	Fred Calvert	Unknown	29 September 1973
5	5	"River of Peril"	Fred Calvert	Unknown	6 October 1973
6	6	"Fire at Sea"	Fred Calvert	Unknown	13 October 1973
7	7	"Tsunami"	Fred Calvert	Unknown	20 October 1973
8	8	"Brushfire"	Fred Calvert	Unknown	27 October 1973
9	9	"Oil's Well"	Fred Calvert	Unknown	3 November 1973
10	10	"Winter Nightmare"	Fred Calvert	Unknown	10 November 1973
11	11	"Cry Wolf"	Fred Calvert	Unknown	17 November 1973

=== Season 2 (1974) ===
No. overall	No. in season	Title	Directed by	Written by	Original release date
12	1	"Bicycle Thieves"	Fred Calvert	John Bates	14 September 1974
13	2	"S.O.S. Help Us!"	Fred Calvert	Robert and Charlene Bralver	21 September 1974
14	3	"King of the Mountain"	Fred Calvert	Unknown	28 September 1974
15	4	"Stuntman"	Fred Calvert	David and Susan Dworski	5 October 1974
16	5	"Odyssey I"	Fred Calvert	Unknown	12 October 1974
17	6	"Odyssey II"	Fred Calvert	Unknown	19 October 1974
18	7	"Out of the Blue"	Fred Calvert	Don Goodman	26 October 1974
19	8	"Afterburner"	Fred Calvert	Janus McBride	2 November 1974
20	9	"Wheels of Fire"	Fred Calvert	John Bates	9 November 1974
21	10	"Ghost of Billy Silver"	Fred Calvert	John Bates	16 November 1974
22	11	"The Old Crox"	Fred Calvert	John Bates	23 November 1974
23	12	"Blast Off"	Fred Calvert	John Bates	30 November 1974

== Credits ==
=== Season 1 ===
- Produced and Directed by Fred Calvert
- Starring the Voices of Randolph Mantooth and Kevin Tighe, with Donald Fullilove, Peter Haas, David Jolliffe, Sarah Kennedy
- Associate Producer: Clifford Alsberg
- Created by Harold Jack Bloom, R. A. Cinader
- Stories by Joel Kane, Carol Henning, David & Susan Dworski, Peter Dixon, Joe Bonaduce, Norman Maurer, Fred Freiberger, Michael Donovan
- Storyboard Director: Jan Green
- Storyboards: Bill Perez, Joe Bruno, Corny Cole
- Story Editors: Harriet Foster, Janis Fierstein
- Animation Director: Ray Patterson
- Animation: Edwin Aardal, Joan Drake, Daniel De La Vega, Shannon Lee Dyer, Robert Goe, Fred Hellmich, Robert Maxfield, Ambrozi Paliwoda, Morey Reden, Allen Wilzbach
- Production Designer: Don Jurwich
- Layout: Ray Aragon, Dale Barnhart, Kimie Calvert, Norm Gottfredson, Paul Gruwell, Alex Ignatiev, Michael Moss, James Mueller, Michael O'Mara, Norly Paat, Joel Seibel, Tony Sgroi, Craig Spaulding, Grace Stanzell, Al Wilson, Zygamond Jablecki
- Background Stylist: Walt Peregoy
- Background: Daniela Bielecka, Linda Langmade, Carolyn Lim, Cathy Patrick, Don Schweikert, Donald Watson
- Production Coordinator: Paul Shively
- Music by Sound Track Music Company
- Editing: Bill Shippey, Peter Aries
- Ink and Paint Supervisor: Pat Jencks
- Checking Supervisor: Jan Cornell
- Scene Coordinator: Rollie Greenwood
- Xerox Supervisor: Ralph Coffman
- Camera: Animation Camera Services, Inc.
- Sound Engineering: Tom Rees, Valentine Recording
- Production Assistants: Vanessa O'Meara, Carolyn Rosales
- Fred Calvert Productions in association with Mark VII Limited and Universal Studios

=== Season 2 ===
- Executive Producers: Fred Calvert, Michael Jaffe
- Produced and Directed by Fred Calvert
- Associate Producer: Janis Fierstein
- Created by Harold Jack Bloom, R.A. Cinader
- Starring the Voices of Randolph Mantooth and Kevin Tighe, with Donald Fullilove, Peter Haas, Sarah Kennedy, Bobby Diamond, Richard Paul, Jack DeLeon, Casey Kasem
- Story Editors: Harriet Foster, Janis Fierstein
- Art Director: Kimie Calvert
- Storyboard/Layout: Gerard Baldwin, Gordon Bellamy, Norly Paat, Michael O'Mara, Roy Wilson, Bill Perez
- Animation: Shannon Lee Dyer, Edwin Aardal, Ed DeMattia, Fred Hellmich, Don Schloat, Allen Wilzbach
- Background Stylist: Walt Peregoy
- Background: Daniela Bielecka, Cathy Patrick, Don Schweikert, Donald Watson
- Music by Sound Track Music Company
- Editing: Bill Shippey, Peter Aries
- Production Coordinator: Don Schloat
- Scene Coordinator: Rollie Greenwood
- Ink and Paint Supervisor: Laurie Curran
- Xerox Supervisor: Ralph Coffman
- Camera: Animation Camera Services, Inc.
- Voice Track: Larrabee Sound
- Fred Calvert Productions in association with Mark VII Limited and Universal Studios
