= List of Emergency! episodes =

List of episodes from the 1970s television show, "Emergency!"

The television series Emergency! originally aired from January 15, 1972, to May 28, 1977. Six seasons aired, with a total of 122 episodes, followed by six television films over the following two years.

== Series overview ==
Season	Episodes	Originally released	
Season	Episodes	First released	Last released
1	11	January 22, 1972	April 15, 1972
2	21	September 16, 1972	April 7, 1973
3	22	September 12, 1973	March 23, 1974
4	22	September 14, 1974	March 1, 1975
5	22	September 13, 1975	March 6, 1976
6	24	September 25, 1976	May 28, 1977
Television films		January 7, 1978	July 3, 1979

== Episodes ==
=== Pilot movie (1972) ===
Title	Directed by	Written by	Original release date
The Wedworth-Townsend Act	Jack Webb	Harold Jack Bloom & R.A. Cinader	January 15, 1972
Seeing a dire need in the community for on-the-spot medical assistance, LA County Firefighters Roy DeSoto (Kevin Tighe) and Johnny Gage (Randolph Mantooth) attempt to convince their staunchest opponent, Rampart General Hospital's Chief of Emergency Medicine, Dr. Kelly Brackett (Robert Fuller), to support paramedic legislation. Because of his pride, Dr. Brackett ridicules field medical response by firefighters—even trained and qualified ones—as an absurd notion. Rampart's Chief Nurse of the Emergency Room, Ms. Dixie McCall (Julie London), also Roy's and Johnny's mentor and friend, encourages Brackett to reconsider his stance. Their colleague Dr. Joe Early (Bobby Troup) also lends his support to Johnny and Roy. Dixie's life is saved by paramedics after she is rendered unconscious in an accident. Note: Martin Milner and Kent McCord of Adam-12 guest-star.

=== Season 1 (1972) ===
Two versions of the opening credits sequence were used this season: episodes 1–4 had the original version, while episode 5 onwards had a different version. The latter version was used through the end of Season 4. The music was written, arranged and composed by Nelson Riddle.

No. overall	No. in season	Title	Directed by	Written by	Original release date	Script order
1	1	"Mascot"	Lawrence Dobkin	Preston Wood	January 22, 1972	34401
Paramedic Johnny Gage promises both Ms. Dixie McCall and Paramedic Roy DeSoto, to tend a distraught car accident victim, that he will take care of her precious "Bonny". Bonny turns out to be a pedigree show dog. A young woman is driven to Rampart ER by her mother—in more ways than one. When a diabetic chooses to drink on a date, he ends the night fighting off the Rampart ER staff. Unruly party guests make it hard for the paramedics to treat a man having a heart attack. When a hunter falls off a steep cliff in the mountains, Gage and DeSoto travel by helicopter to rescue him.
2	2	"Botulism"	Herschel Daugherty	Michael Donovan	January 29, 1972	34409
Johnny Gage, the subject of practical jokes at Station 51, contemplates the best form of revenge. After a man working on a smokestack breaks his back, Gage and DeSoto rappel down to his aid. Despite his agony they are unable to give him painkilling drugs. After DeSoto explains how his pain is their guide to avoid further damage he is rescued. A wife fakes a heart attack—yet again—to avoid an argument with her bickering husband. The Brackett/McCall workplace romance hits some bumps. Dixie becomes more concerned about a student nurse, whose performances are affected by Dr. Brackett's intolerable behavior. Dr. Early's stethoscope gets stuck. When a movie studio cameraman takes a fall, Drs. Early and Brackett have to work backwards to find the real reason he fell. The search leads to a potluck dish of beef stroganoff at the yacht club. Dr. Brackett has to make a risky call before he has all the facts. A young boy playing in an abandoned building is trapped when the building collapses.
3	3	"Cook's Tour"	Christian Nyby	Daryl Henry	February 12, 1972	34406
Roy worries that the other Station 51 personnel won't like his cooking. Dixie congratulates Johnny after he delivers a cyanotic baby. A small boy gets his hand stuck in a vase. As student nurse Sharon Walters (Patricia Mickey) rushes to find an ice pack for the boy to use, Dixie cautions her about running in the hospital. A man repairing a washer gets an electric shock. A man is trapped on a crane.
4	4	"Brushfire"	Hollingsworth Morse	Robert C. Dennis	February 19, 1972	34402
Station 51 is called up to fight an out-of-control brushfire that threatens the house of a pregnant woman in labor, who cannot be moved. An elderly woman breaks her ankle. A man is injured in a horse stampede. A looter (Tony Dow) is injured in a motorcycle accident. A boy breaks his arm and loses his dog. A firefighter is trapped and injured under a fallen tree.
5	5	"Dealer's Wild"	Lawrence Dobkin	Carey Wilber	February 26, 1972	34404
Because John keeps losing at cards and being stuck with doing the dishes at the station, he creates his own card game. Off-duty, Dr. Brackett and Dixie take time to unwind. They meditate on people who want to die and people who want to live. Roy talks down a boy in a plane after the pilot (his father) has a heart attack. The paramedics respond to an attempted suicide, an overturned gasoline trailer tanker truck, and a teenage overdose victim. Brackett, Early, Morton (semi-regular Ron Pinkard), and Dixie take care of a husband who is suffering from a severe hemorrhage. When the pilot goes into cardiac arrest and cannot be brought back, Dixie comforts the boy. Blooper: Although he is playing (and is addressed as) Mike Morton in this episode, Ron Pinkard still wears the "Tom Gray" name badge from the pilot.
6	6	"Nurse's Wild"	Herschel Daugherty	Fred Freiberger	March 4, 1972	34405
Sparks fly between John and a student nurse. A store owner shoots an armed robber and is filled with remorse, a dog delays the rescue of an unconscious woman, a man is bitten by a black widow spider, Dr. Early deals with a man suffering from delirium tremens, and a man is injured at a chemical plant and trapped on some pipes. Dr. Brackett and Dixie deal with a tough man suffering from chest pains. Dixie and Dr. Morton assume an unconscious hippie is on drugs.
7	7	"Publicity Hound"	Christian Nyby	Michael Donovan	March 11, 1972	34407
John is envious of the publicity given to another paramedic (Gary Crosby). John later becomes seasick after he and Roy have rescued a man in ship's rigging. A powerful tycoon (Gene Raymond) threatens to take Dr. Brackett to court because of the tycoon's son's diagnosis; however, with Dr. Brackett's and Dixie's help, Dr. Early eventually successfully calms the tycoon down. Dixie takes care of an already taken lady (Edith Diaz) whom John was going to see. The paramedics rescue a horse from a ditch and a child stuck in a well.
8	8	"Weird Wednesday"	Lawrence Dobkin	Daryl Henry	March 18, 1972	34410
John comments on how weird things were going to happen on his shift, and he is proven right as they have to rescue a parachutist stuck in a tree. Also on that weird Wednesday, an obese man collapses while jogging; after an 80-year-old woman sprains her ankle while dancing at her birthday party, the guests go to the hospital to resume the fun; a man cannot stop hiccuping; a boy tries to freeze himself to preserve his body; a female golfer is bitten by a rattlesnake; a prostitute brings a John in after he suffers a heart attack; and finally, John and Roy rescue a drunk driver, during which John is injured. A seaman in pain shows up at Rampart, but speaks no English.
9	9	"Dilemma"	Christian Nyby	Michael Donovan	March 25, 1972	34411
An elevator gets stuck between floors, and then the brake drum fails; inside, a woman has a heart attack. Despite Sharon Walters' (Patricia Mickey) admiration for Dr. Brackett, he sets her off whenever he is around to see her please him; Dixie thus diagnoses her nursing student with "Bracketitis." Later, a fireman buff develops a crush on John, who tries to get rid of her. A man is injured in his junkyard. An industrial accident takes place at a railroad yard. With the help of Dixie, and before Nurse Sharon Walters smiles in front of both Dixie and Dr. Brackett, they all take care of a man with pulmonary embolism.
10	10	"Hang-Up"	Lawrence Dobkin	Preston Wood	April 8, 1972	34408
Johnny makes his best effort to find out the end of an Adam-12 episode that he missed while responding to a thief trapped in an air-conditioning duct. Dixie also listens in on Johnny's situation, about his favorite television show, prior to taking that call with Roy. Two battered men continue their brawl in the hospital. A man ruins his cast by going surfing. Dr. Brackett treats a woman with a neurological disorder. Dixie is tired of all the nonsense happening in the hospital and taking advantage of anybody's emergencies someplace else. Radioactivity impedes the rescue of a lab worker.
11	11	"Crash"	Christian Nyby	Gerald Sanford	April 15, 1972	34403
John and Roy bring in a football player who was tackled too hard. A burglar has a heart attack. John wants Roy to apologize for calling him "some kind of nut." Dixie and Dr. Early treat a hypochondriac. A babysitter brings in a child who had swallowed some pills, and Dixie talks to her about this. Roy and John rescue the occupants of a light plane that had crashed into a tree.

=== Season 2 (1972–73) ===
No. overall	No. in season	Title	Directed by	Written by	Original release date	Script order
12	1	"Decision" "Problem"	Christian Nyby	Preston Wood	September 16, 1972	35701
Roy and John rescue a trapped man whose engine fell on him, but en route to the hospital, Roy's link to Rampart malfunctions, and he is forced to treat the injured man without supervision. When the patient later dies from his injuries, his doctor (Lloyd Bochner) excoriates Roy and the whole paramedic program, angering Drs. Brackett, Early and Dixie, especially after a doctor dies from a heart attack despite all their efforts, and Roy considers resigning from the program. Dixie chokes down on Roy's decision. Other rescues include a motorcyclist gored by a bull and a boy and his dog in a house fire.
13	2	"Kids"	Georg Fenady	Michael Donovan	September 23, 1972	35708
A stray dog wanders into the station; the station personnel name him Boot, but Boot promptly takes a dislike to John. Later, Roy and John rescue a boy trapped in a hole; examination of the boy leads the doctors to determine the boy has a history of child abuse. A girl runs to Dixie telling her she is giving an airplane to a boy, then Dixie also asks the girl if her best friend hurt himself falling down the hole. The girl says he did not, to which the boy says she is lying. Dr. Brackett's efforts to save the boy from his abusive life fail in the legal system–and lead to tragic results. Other rescues include a boy whose head was stuck in a basement window, Dr. Early freeing a boy's hand from his father's sport steering wheel, and the firefighters rescuing an injured hiker (John Travolta) from a rapidly spreading brush fire with help from Boot, who "adopts" a different fire station.
14	3	"Show Biz"	Sam C. Freedle	Daryl Henry	September 30, 1972	35711
John is excited about a photo shoot involving female models. A country doctor (Henry Jones) helps aid a man trapped under a tractor when Rampart is out of radio range, then himself becomes a patient when he suffers a heart attack. Other rescues include a man drowning in a swimming pool and two stuntmen trapped in a waterfall at a movie studio. A woman is distraught about running over and killing a young girl; when her father shows up bullying one of Ms. McCall's nurses demanding to see the woman, Dr. Early informs him that she died of a brain hemorrhage due to alcoholism or drunkenness.
15	4	"Virus"	Lawrence Dobkin	Daryl Henry	October 7, 1972	35702
A woman (Cathy Lee Crosby) returning from Asia with a monkey also brought back a highly contagious virus that kills a firefighter and sickens Dr. Brackett; later John too is stricken during a rescue of a man having a heart attack on a scaffold, of whom the rescue fails. But the woman is not as sickened and her traveling partner appears to have immunity to the disease. As two professionals are fighting, Dixie talks to the wife, whose husband is dying. While Dixie, Dr. Early and Roy treat John, Nurse Walters and Dr. Early treat Dr. Brackett; his conjecture about the woman's immunity proves to be crucial to finding the treatment for the virus. The firefighters also rescue a boy who has Ménière's disease from a treehouse.
16	5	"Peace Pipe"	Christian Nyby	Michael Donovan	October 14, 1972	35706
A drunk driver (William Campbell) rams into a car, trapping a little girl inside, and the doctors are concerned the girl may have brain damage, which leads Dixie (before Dr. Brackett), into explaining her parents about that disability, as well as paralysis, if surgery is successful. Firefighter Chester B. "Chet" Kelly (Tim Donnelly) pesters Gage about his Native American heritage. The firefighters have to rescue a man on a scaffold while a sniper is pinning them down. Other rescues include a boy getting his hand stuck in a gumball machine, a woman whose extremely tight girdle is causing breathing problems, and a fire caused by a workman mixing fuel into water lines.
17	6	"Saddled"	Georg Fenady	Herb Purdum	October 21, 1972	35707
Dixie injures her toe, which brings on teasing from Drs. Brackett and Early. John decides to do some saddle shopping in preparation for trying for the rodeo. Roy and John aid a girl injured in the explosion of a soda bottle. When Roy cites the owner of a business (Larry Storch) for an improperly installed gas heater, the owner scoffs at the fireman until they have to return when the heater explodes, injuring the owner. Dr. Brackett and Dixie protects a boy, lapsing into a coma, after falling from a tree–later found to be suffering from the ITP blood disorder, and saving several children and a driving nun from a school bus crashed on a gorge.
18	7	"Fuzz Lady"	Christian I. Nyby II	Michael Donovan	November 4, 1972	35712
Johnny and Roy treat a mugger with a broken leg, given at the hands of a female sheriff (Sharon Gless) for whom Johnny falls. Dixie reports that several items, including Johnny's jacket, have been disappearing from Rampart. Dixie, Johnny and Roy were all responsible for Dr. Morton's cocky attitude, as Dr. Brackett learns in a conversation he has with Dr. Morton regarding this. The firefighters rescue an elderly man from his burning house, assist a grandfather who was injured by a model rocket, and rescue a boat thief (Paul Fix) trapped on a crane. Boot the dog returns to Station 51, but with the same negative attitude toward Johnny.
19	8	"Trainee"	Dennis Donnelly	Jim Owens	November 11, 1972	35715
A proud and arrogant paramedic trainee who served in the Vietnam War rides with John and Roy and help stop a purse-snatching, aid in an injured man who fell down a cliff, assist with an overdose victim, and a man who had an insulin reaction, all the while dealing with the trainee's attitude–thinking he knows more than the veteran paramedics, the head nurse, and the ER doctors at Rampart. Dixie confronts him about competing with the entire staff, before John and Roy did the same thing with their trainee.
20	9	"Women"	Georg Fenady	Daryl Henry	November 25, 1972	35713
A feminist journalist Christy Todd (Leslie Charleson) is assigned to cover Squad 51's rescues, and takes an immediate dislike to the chauvinistic demeanor towards her, when Dixie overhears the message about Johnny's bossy behavior, and many of the other firefighters and male doctors show. The journalist also observes the team save a trapped man inside a collided old six-wheeled tanker truck stuck under live power lines, a man trapped in a sofa-bed, another man (Dick Van Patten) whose arm is stuck in a garbage disposal, and another man trapped in a bombed building, from which Roy has to rescue his injured partner, Johnny, before the building explodes. The doctors treat a small boy poisoned by wild hemlock and a young girl addicted to drugs. After a nurse fails to follow Dr. Brackett's instructions, he vehemently fires her, but Dixie insists that Dr. Brackett himself has brought that on, hearing from him about the mistakes that kill people, which leads her to calm him down.
21	10	"Dinner Date"	Dennis Donnelly	Dick Morgan	December 2, 1972	35705
Roy tries to set John up with his wife's cousin. An epileptic woman nearly hits a child when he rides out between two parked cars; the ensuing emotional trauma throws her into a mild seizure. A man shoots his son-in-law when he discovers his daughter (Laurette Spang) was married and pregnant without his knowledge. Drug and alcohol addictions rear their heads in four cases: A woman suffering from gangrene in her hand, an alcoholic who collapsed at his home in a hepatic coma, a girl poisoned by taking pills laced with sodium hydroxide, and a man suffering from tetanus. Other rescues include an obese man whose pacemaker has failed and freeing an asthmatic child who has gotten an arm stuck in a swimming pool drain, with the help of Dixie, Dr. Early, John and Roy, while in the hospital.
22	11	"Musical Mania"	Christian I. Nyby II	Kenneth Dorward	December 9, 1972	35717
John takes up bagpipes, then trombone, and finally guitar after Chet jokes with him about playing the squad's horn. John and Roy treat a gardener suffering from tetanus, a driver of an ice cream truck trapped after a wreck stuck under live power lines, a girl who has overdosed on barbiturates and later dies, and a pilot of a glider who crashed, and they also free a man trapped under his house. Dixie and Dr. Early talk to a couple whose son is suffering from saturnism or lead poisoning, later found to be also suffering from deprivation dwarfism, and the father refuses to treat his son with experimental growth hormones.
23	12	"Helpful"	Lawrence Dobkin	Preston Wood	December 16, 1972	35714
When Roy and Joanne have a fight, John offers his assistance, which makes the situation worse. During the rescue of a man whose car is hanging over a bridge, the erratic instructions and behavior of a new doctor, Dr. Varner, concern Dixie. Dr. Varner later catches an atrial myxoma that Drs. Early and Brackett had both missed, but she then is found asleep in her car, and Dixie learns the reason for her behavior. The firefighters assist a man who had fallen off a roof trying to get his dog down, and two children lost in a rapidly flooding storm drain.
24	13	"Drivers"	Samuel Freedle	Jim Owens	January 6, 1973	35709
John complains about drivers failing to yield to the squad when their lights are on, so he writes the Chief who employs a deputy to monitor driver behavior. A college quarterback suffers from muscle cramps affecting his back which sidelines him from a big weekend game, Roy and John teach a CPR class to a group of senior citizens, then learn that their former paramedic instructor has died from cardiac arrest. The firefighters rescue a boy stuck upside down in a tree, and assist people trapped in a large fire at a hotel, complicated by a cardiac victim on the third floor.
25	14	"School Days"	Christian Nyby	Kenneth Dorward	January 13, 1973	35703
John and Roy are breaking in a new trainee who lacks self-confidence in tight situations, including assisting an elderly man who was injured by a falling bookcase, an ambulance broadsided by a car at the entrance of a golf course, a boy injured in a chemistry lab accident at his home, a sleeping man with a "snake" on his chest, and a man injured and trapped in a junkyard. A man says to Dixie that the boy's mother was separating; she asks them to find his mother. Dixie talks to the mother, whose own son is suffering from a brain hemorrhage. Doctors treat a baseball player beaned in a game while not wearing a batting helmet.
26	15	"The Professor"	Christian I. Nyby II	Michael Donovan	February 3, 1973	35721
A professor (Hedley Mattingly) working with the Secret Service is experiencing symptoms of schizophrenia, and Dr. Brackett resents the interference of the government agents in the professor's care, where the professor's wife (Jane Merrow) talks to Dixie, whose husband was brought over to the hospital for a physical examination. Roy has an admirer calling him everywhere, despite Johnny saying, to both Dixie and Dr. Early, his partner has no "charisma," and needles him relentlessly about it. Between the phone calls, the firefighters assist a plane crash victim, deliver a premature baby and help prevent a suicidal man from jumping off a building under construction.
27	16	"Syndrome"	Dennis Donnelly	Michael Donovan	February 10, 1973	35719
Roy complains of a "tickle" in his throat, but dismisses Johnny's suspicions that it is tonsillitis, noting that he had had his tonsils removed. A famous actor (Robert Alda) and former flame of Dixie's, is admitted to Rampart with chest pain, later suspected to be related to excessive MSG consumption, while his producer (Jack Carter) clamors for him to be released to finish filming his TV show. While Dr. Early deals with a hypochondriac, Boot the dog has surgery to remove a tick. The firefighters and paramedics assist two boys stuck on top of a gas tank, several girls injured in a rough field hockey game, and a fire at Olive View Hospital set by an arsonist that trapped four people results in Chet being injured and taken to the hospital; there he is roomed with Roy, whose tonsils had, much to his consternation, grown back which forced him to undergo another operation to have the regenerated tonsils removed.
28	17	"Honest"	Christian I. Nyby II	Daryl Henry	February 17, 1973	35722
A gas explosion injures a newlywed couple, because the wife had lied to the husband about his cigars, and this leads Johnny on a crusade to be honest in any situation. A boy is brought into Rampart choking to death for no apparent reason; Dr. Morton's brutal honesty about the situation sends the boy's mother into hysterics, which leads Dixie and Johnny into calming her; a boy is critically injured diving off a roof; Johnny and Roy rescue a family of three from a burning house; and Dixie and Dr. Early treat a man who "might" be having a heart attack because his father had died from one at the same age. Chet lies to Johnny about a woman that keeps calling for him.
29	18	"Seance"	Georg Fenady	Preston Wood	February 24, 1973	35720
A woman attends a seance for her recently deceased sister and suffers a seizure, after which she repeatedly calls the squad because she is convinced that subsequent odd occurrences are being caused by her sister. Dr. Brackett and Dixie treat a young man who took unprescribed tranquilizers, while the firefighters rescue a man pinned under a load of cartons and a driver trapped underwater in his car.
30	19	"Boot"	Christian I. Nyby II	Preston Wood	March 3, 1973	35718
Boot the dog is not eating, and the Station 51 personnel are concerned, even consulting with Rampart's staff, about their mascot. The cause proves to have been Chet yelling at Boot, who receives the temperature from Drs. Brackett and Morton, from Dixie. John and Roy tend to a woman who got her hair caught in a mixer, her hand stuck in a bowl, and catches her stove on fire while making dinner; a woman trapped in her sportscar pinned underneath a gasoline trailer tanker truck; and an explosion at a Rampart Hospital lab endangers the workers and important records stored there. The doctors treat an unconscious man suffering from internal bleeding caused by taking aspirin with Coumadin-brand warfarin, and a man (Jamie Farr) who is convinced that he is suffering from a curse.
31	20	"Rip-Off"	Christian I. Nyby II	Michael Donovan	March 10, 1973	35723
Roy and John are accused of stealing $500 from a prominent TV personality they were treating for a cardiac condition, and the ensuing police investigation really unnerves the paramedics. A car crash results in the delivery of a premature baby and the baby's father being blinded; his wife tries to give him hope that his blindness is only temporary. The firefighters rescue two men involved in a cargo airplane accident involving leaking liquid oxygen, which could cause an explosion.
32	21	"Audit"	Georg Fenady	Preston Wood	April 7, 1973	35725
John is worried about a pending IRS audit. The paramedics attempt to help a man hit on the head, but he refuses their assistance and demands to see a doctor; later, the man proves to be a professional medical con man. When the patient disappears, Dr. Brackett admits to Dixie, he had not moved him. John and Roy get a baby out of a hot and locked car, then encounter an angry mother upset at their interference. A pregnant hippie woman (Katherine Cannon) is having trouble breathing and is brought into Rampart, where Dr. Brackett and Dixie find that untreated rheumatic fever has left her with a deformed heart valve. The firefighters and paramedics save a man (James McEachin) trapped in a collapsed building under construction, and the man wants Roy to amputate his leg before the rest of the building collapses.

=== Season 3 (1973–74) ===
No. overall	No. in season	Title	Directed by	Written by	Original release date	Script order
33	1	"Frequency"	Dennis Donnelly	Kenneth Dorward	September 22, 1973	37401
John's policeman friend is injured in, and later dies from, a car accident; the delay in treatment due to another Squad tying up the biophone frequency with a heart case leads Roy to speculate if the delay may make a difference later. The doctors treat a child (Ike Eisenmann) who turns out to be drunk. Thanks to Dr. Brackett and Dixie, John and Roy assist in treating opposing members of a bike gang after a bloody rumble, and it spills over into the ER. Other rescues include that of a man who welded himself inside his own kinetic art sculpture, and a father and son trapped in a building collapse at a construction site.
34	2	"The Old Engine"	Christian I. Nyby II	Preston Wood	September 29, 1973	37402
Station 51 gets their new fire engine, which gets put to use during a junkyard fire. While there, Roy and John buy an older engine they had found there. The paramedics try to help a woman on LSD and have to chase her down to the top of a building when she flees. The base station at Rampart is upgraded with a new transmitter and radio for better management of Squad traffic. Dr. Brackett and Dixie both treat a gunshot victim (Michael Conrad) who later undergoes surgery, and wants to walk out immediately afterwards. Meanwhile, the paramedics treat a politician suffering from a heart attack, and the station responds to a warehouse fire.
35	3	"Alley Cat"	Alan Crosland	Charlene Sukins	October 6, 1973	37407
John discovers that he will be a father–to kittens, when a pregnant stray cat appears on his bed, and Boot the dog is not happy about the cat being there. The paramedics rescue a family involved in a plane crash; the father dies, the mother and young daughter are injured; and a grizzled junk dealer who got his foot stuck in a bear trap. A stage actress is suffering from tachycardia after getting a bad review of her performance; Dr. Brackett takes care of her, while Dixie talks to her husband. The firefighters assist a child sickened by a gas leak at a school and rescue a man involved in a boating accident.
36	4	"An English Visitor"	Alan Crosland	Michael Donovan	October 13, 1973	37416
A paramedic from England rides with Roy and John to observe the paramedic program at work, and is present during a fire caused by a molotov cocktail thrown at a policeman, helping a wild-west performer with an injured finger, a traffic accident involving a car loaded with marijuana, and a man trapped in a construction site. During this last rescue, John nearly falls off a scaffold, and the visitor saves his life. A rock singer, who is brought into the ER in a diabetic coma complicated by pneumonia, whom Dr. Brackett treats, and her manager is more concerned with the money lost than her well being, complicated by a nurse with a bad attitude impacting the patients, with Dr. Early. After Dixie confronted the nurse about her mouthing off, in front of Dr. Early's patient, she received a complaint about her partner's misbehavior, who was absolutely disgusted.
37	5	"Heavyweight"	Dennis Donnelly	Kenneth Dorward	October 20, 1973	37405
Johnny injures his shoulder during a rescue of a pregnant woman in labor. When her baby is born with a cleft palate, she is determined to give him up for adoption, feeling the deformity is due to her defying her parents by getting married, till Dixie and Dr. Brackett speak with her. Dixie must also locate the woman's parents, who also had family. Dr. Morton reads Johnny the riot act about his physical condition, which starts the paramedic on a fitness regimen. Dr. Early treats the son of a drug-addicted mother who suffered an electric shock putting a screwdriver into a TV. The paramedics treat a stabbing victim and the man he shot; then the police have to talk the son out of shooting the man who shot his father. Johnny and Roy rescue a hang glider pilot stuck in a tree.
38	6	"Snakebite"	Georg Fenady	Carroll Christensen	October 27, 1973	37410
John, Roy and Chet are returning from a "boring" fishing trip in a rural town when they come across a traffic accident. One man is dead, and a mother and son are injured; they have to find a local doctor to assist them. The firemen help rescue the victims of a rollover accident off a cliff; after the victims are med-evacked to Rampart, where Dixie offers the assistant nurse to take on the case of a patient suffering from heart trouble, with Dr. Early, from Squad 45. John is bitten by a rattlesnake, motivating Chet to lend assistance to him, and he is rushed to Rampart atop Engine 51's hosebed.
39	7	"The Promotion"	Christian I. Nyby II	Preston Wood	November 3, 1973	37413
Roy passes the Engineer's exam, but since accepting the promotion would mean leaving the paramedics–and John, he talks over his decision with Drs. Brackett and Early. The firefighters handle a fog-caused multi-vehicle accident on the San Diego Freeway, resulting in numerous deaths and injuries, including one man with a heart murmur, whom Dixie and Dr. Early help in treating. The paramedics attempt to assist an attempted suicide but are sent to a vacant lot instead; when they find the right location, they end up in the middle of a domestic dispute. John and a security guard are injured in a fire and Roy has to rescue both of them.
40	8	"Insomnia"	Dennis Donnelly	Robert Hamner	November 10, 1973	37417
John is suffering from insomnia due to the lack of night runs, but during their day runs the firefighters respond to an accident aboard a boat where a butane tank had exploded en route to the marina. Dixie, Drs. Brackett and Early treat a boy (Stephen Manley) rescued from a car crash, who suffered a skull fracture when his father swerved to avoid a dog in the road, then a home-grown marijuana smoker who is dying from an unknown ailment until his friend (Ronnie Schell) reveals that his plants were grown with parathion. Later the firefighters rescue a worker pinned under a semi truck at the loading dock and a man and boy who fell into a gravel pit. In the end, John seems to have his sleep problem under control–which may not be a good thing when he mistakenly responds to a night run in which he and DeSoto are not supposed to be involved.
41	9	"Inheritance Tax"	Dennis Donnelly	Arnold Somkin	November 17, 1973	37421
Roy and John receive a letter from the estate of an elderly woman they had rescued 18 months previously that they received an inheritance from her will. The firefighters rescue a child trapped in a car under downed power lines, then attempt to treat a foolish stockbroker with heart issues despite his insistence that his absence will cost him thousands of dollars. Dr. Early helps two young boys needing a bandage. The paramedics treat a teenager who ate 19 hamburgers in a failed attempt to win a competitive eating contest, and a burn victim after an explosive fire at a paint factory.
42	10	"Zero"	Christian I. Nyby II	Brian Taggert	November 24, 1973	37412
Johnny and Roy are guests on a local talk show about their job and Dixie saw Johnny on the television interview, who admits to her he suffers an attack of stage fright and Roy has to "fill in the blanks." The paramedics check on a woman (Jo Anne Worley) who screams for therapeutic reasons at a construction site, then rescue a boy (Bobby Eilbacher) who had attempted suicide by jumping off a ledge. After the boy is brought into Rampart, Drs. Brackett and Early suspect that his mother (Mariette Hartley) has been abusing him, while Dixie offers the boy milk, and protecting him, at the same time. Back in the field, the paramedics assist a teenager whose hand was stuck in a doughnut machine, and rescue a boy trapped in a fire.
43	11	"The Promise"	Alan Crosland	Dee Murphey	December 1, 1973	37424
The paramedics find a mechanic in a catatonic state injured in a vehicle fire at a garage, and the Rampart doctors are unable to determine the cause of his condition. While Dixie reaches a college graduate from San Francisco, Roy and John lecture a frequent caller on the dangers of constantly calling them because of her loneliness, then respond to a woman who had mixed ammonia with bleach and inhaled poisonous monochloramine vapor. Paula Slayton returns to give Gage a Yorkshire Terrier pup, keeping a promise made to him for caring for her dog while she was hospitalized; Boot and the pup engage in a wild chase around the fire station, resulting in Captain Stanley deciding the station can only have one mascot. The firefighters assist an elderly couple trapped in their home–by tumbleweeds. The catatonic patient receives an injection from his friend–and he responds by jumping out a window onto a ledge; he then almost kicks Johnny off onto the parking lot, until he is tranquilized.
44	12	"Body Language"	Dennis Donnelly	Arthur Weiss	December 8, 1973	37418
Johnny's current girlfriend misinterprets a discussion for a wedding proposal. The firemen assist a crop-dusting pilot who had been spraying parathion from his plane, which then crashed and punctured his lung, and poisons a bystander with the pesticide. An injured boy using a walker wants to use crutches instead, and Dixie provides him with such crutches. A man gets treated for an ear infection that resulted from the insertion of mothballs into his ear, and Drs. Brackett, Early, and Morton unanimously agree that the man does not need a hospital stay. The paramedics treat a couple who had overdosed on daffodil bulbs mixed with alcohol, a weekend cowboy who had fallen off a horse but refused treatment until he collapsed again with a possible skull fracture, a traffic accident on U.S. Route 101 results in two victims starting a relationship, and the crew responds to a call where a lead singer of a rock band is in cardiac arrest due to drugs.
45	13	"Understanding"	Georg Fenady	Preston Wood	December 15, 1973	37425
After Chet takes to playing John's guitar, John gives it to him. The firefighters rescue a man and a girl's horse from a fire caused by moonshine. Dixie gives a man a stern lecture about forgetting his insulin shots. When a woman calls the hospital threatening suicide, Dr. Brackett and Dixie keep her talking, while the firefighters track her down; later, John and Roy find themselves hostages when they are called to aid a heart patient–the manager of a bank being held up by two armed men. Guest star John Russell as Sam Jeffers
46	14	"Computer Error"	Joel Oliansky	John Groves	December 22, 1973	37415
John gets a credit card bill for $842 instead of $8.42 after taking a girl on a date, and the station personnel, and Dixie hear all about it. The firemen rescue a young couple from a traffic accident, but the boy (Donny Most) has a spinal cord injury and the girl (Audrey Landers) may be pregnant; this makes Dr. Early reluctant to take x-rays until her condition is determined. Later, the paramedics help a woman who fell into an old well, a magician (Larry Storch) trapped in a safe, and a man trapped in a junkyard fire that turns explosive when stored ammunition starts going off.
47	15	"Inferno"	Christian I. Nyby II	Brian Taggert	January 5, 1974	37420
A large brush fire sends out several fire stations, except Squad 51, which is returned to quarters, disappointing John and Roy, who monitor the fire events on the radio and TV. Dixie gets her hand caught in a malfunctioning coffee machine; John and Roy help free it, then save a lawyer who had suffered a heart attack in the courtroom. Roy comforts the wife of a fireman injured in the brush fire, then the paramedics, called to assist in the fire, get trapped by the flames while rescuing another firefighter.
48	16	"Messin' Around"	Richard Newton	Dennis Landa	January 12, 1974	37422
Chet, adopting a persona he calls "The Phantom Bomber," nails Johnny with a number of practical jokes, for which Johnny later gets his revenge. A child is stuck in a tree house while the tree is burning and is rescued by Johnny; the girl's widowed mother (Ann Prentiss) takes an interest in him, all the while, Dixie takes care of the little girl, who herself also has slight burns. The girl then fields a visit from an elderly man and frequent visitor to Rampart known as "Old Bill." (J. Pat O'Malley) Dixie, Drs. Brackett and Early think "Old Bill" is a hypochondriac until Roy and Johnny find him unconscious in his home with septic shock. Johnny and Roy help a moaning man after his wife gives him Dieffenbachia sap to shut him up, a gas station attendant (Karl Swenson) with a perforated ulcer, a young boy who swallows ant poison and later dies–his mother thought he was just trying to "get attention"–and three men stuck after a bulldozer accident at a garbage dump.
49	17	"Fools"	Joseph Pevney	Eric Kaldor	January 19, 1974	37423
A young intern (Bobby Sherman) who is the son of one of Rampart's administrators has a rather cocky attitude toward the paramedics; he refuses to allow an IV to a man injured when his chimney explodes after using gasoline to clean it. When a man is nearly killed after the intern orders defib on a heart patient that was not necessary, Dr. Brackett sends him into the field to ride along with Squad 51, where he assists the paramedics in freeing a girl's hand from a mailbox and helps with a heart-attack victim trapped on an explosive oil refinery tower. Ironically, Sherman left the music world in the 1970s to become a paramedic. He eventually was in charge of the training for paramedics in Los Angeles County.
50	18	"How Green Was My Thumb?"	Christian I. Nyby II	John Groves	January 26, 1974	37426
Roy and John save a man who had his partial dental plate stuck in his trachea and stopped his breathing, a problem whose discovery and solution require treatment from Dixie, Drs. Early and Morton. Roy takes care of a young woman's (Leigh Christian) plants while she is hospitalized while John tries to woo a young nurse (Pamela Hensley). A young girl who had a fall injury (Kim Richards) suffers a dog bite, and when her religious parents prevent Dr. Brackett from treating it, hence, Dixie summons the hospital chaplain. The paramedics rescue two men from a winery fire to which the station has responded, and a gun collector who has accidentally fired an unexploded grenade round into his own abdomen undergoes emergency backyard field surgery conducted by Drs. Brackett and Morton.
51	19	"The Hard Hours"	Christian I. Nyby II	Arnold Somkin	February 2, 1974	37414
Dr. Brackett has to tend to one of his own colleagues as Dr. Early is diagnosed with a heart condition and undergoes a bypass, after fixing Station 51's truck. Dixie becomes more concerned about her colleague's operation, after Roy and Johnny exchange words with her. A professional football player (Pro Football Hall of Fame linebacker Dick Butkus) is hit hard by his son and suffers a broken ankle, much to his embarrassment. The firefighters rescue a boy trapped in his homemade rocket, a woman whose toe is stuck in a bathtub faucet, and a worker electrocuted when the basket in which he is working slips onto live wires. Dr. Early's operation is a success, therefore, John and Roy gave their mentor a thermos of Dr. Early's favorite, Capt. Stanley's New England clam chowder. (Nick Nolte) as Fred, a visiting doctor who worked on Dr. Early.
52	20	"Floor Brigade"	Dennis Donnelly	Roland Wolpert	February 9, 1974	37403
Roy tries to convince John about starting a side floor cleaning business and Dixie offers to help. The firefighters rescue "The Hermit" (Pat Buttram) from a collapse in his cave home, and he subsequently befriends Dr. Brackett and Dixie. Dr. Morton treats a diabetic singer who took a mixture of alcohol and pills and became ill. John is injured during a rescue of a trapped man that turned out to be a dummy put there by two juveniles; later, he rescues a chemist trapped in an explosion and fire at a chemical warehouse.
53	21	"Propinquity"	Georg Fenady	Preston Wood	February 16, 1974	37429
While the DeSoto house is being fumigated, John offers to host his partner–a decision both soon regret. John also calls Dixie at the hospital, for a calibrator, which looks good. The paramedics rescue a woman trapped inside a burning car; but later, the ambulance transporting the woman and Roy is involved in a traffic accident caused by a drunk driver, and John doubles back to assist. Dixie, Drs. Early and Morton treat Roy and John with their separate bodily abrasions. A poker player suffering a heart attack refuses to be transported until John plays out his hand, and the firefighters rescue several men injured in an explosion at an abandoned refinery.
54	22	"Inventions"	Kevin Tighe	John Groves	March 23, 1974	37428
The firefighters enter a contest to invent new firefighting tools. The paramedics handle victims of possible radiation poisoning. A comatose man is suffering from a mysterious ailment. John gives Dr. Early some booze to pass to Dixie. A woman’s overweight son is wedged in her living room ceiling. The firemen respond to a leak at a chemical plant.

=== Season 4 (1974–75) ===
No. overall	No. in season	Title	Directed by	Written by	Original release date	Script order
55	1	"The Screenwriter"	Georg Fenady	Eric Brown	September 14, 1974	40607
In preparation for Dixie to introduce Roy and John, to the screenwriter (Shelley Berman), Art follows Squad 51, during a typical day, which includes a motorcycle accident caused by a drunk driver named Gene (Roger Perry), before Dr. Brackett has a conversation with Gene's wife, of both the victim and the drunk driver deal with both their husbands's issues. Other rescues includes a construction worker (Larry Csonka) is exposed to tetraethyl lead and becomes combative to the point that it takes five firefighters to restrain him; the paramedics assist in the birth of a baby to a deaf-mute couple at a supermarket and, later, rescue three men trapped in a toy factory fire that turns explosive.
56	2	"I'll Fix It"	Georg Fenady (listed in error as George Fenady for this episode)	John Groves	September 21, 1974	40602
A man is trapped under their house when it begins collapsing into itself due to the house being built on a natural oil well. Dixie asks Johnny to fix a bike for the fire victim. Chet and Johnny try to repair the bike for the fire victim, prior to Dixie's visitation at Station 51. A bookworm teenager who wants to be a doctor is admitted with abdominal pain, and speaks to Drs. Brackett and Morton using medical terminology. The firefighters rescue a child stuck in a pipe, and remove a ring–from the finger of a young man–that belongs to a woman with a jealous husband (Richard Kiel). Later, Roy and Capt. Stanley work on a stuck shut-off valve at a chemical plant fire.
57	3	"Gossip"	Kevin Tighe	Preston Wood	September 28, 1974	40601
When an armored car is involved in an accident, Roy and John have to break into it to rescue a trapped passenger. The victim driving the car that hit it has a skull fracture that needs consent from his wife, with whom Dixie discusses the situation, but it turns out that he has two wives.(Yvonne Craig) and (Zina Bethune) One of the Rampart nurses starts spreading rumors about Dr. Morton's financial situation, and Dixie confronts the young, experienced nurse about spreading gossip. A child is brought in with cyanide poisoning from eating peach pits. Roy tries to get John to enter the Fireman's Olympics track events. The firefighters rescue a man hanging in mid-air from live power lines, an electrocution victim hanging in mid-air, and a man trapped in an explosive warehouse fire.
58	4	"Nagging Suspicion"	Christian I. Nyby II	Joseph Polizzi	October 5, 1974	40614
John is trying to get DeSoto to give up his "system" for picking winning horses out of the newspaper. The firefighters rescue a woman who fell into the lion's cage at the zoo and was bitten; help an exotic dancer (Lindsay Bloom) who became ill from mono at a strip club, to whom Dr. Brackett and Dixie tend; then assist an adult (Robert Q. Lewis) who fell off a skateboard into a cactus patch on his rump (John then does the very same thing); and save a wounded policeman from a sniper.
59	5	"Communication Gaffe"	Georg Fenady	Charlene Bralver & Robert Bralver	October 12, 1974	40610
The DeSoto spouses, Roy and Joanne, appear on a TV quiz show. The firefighters then respond to a liquor store shooting involving a policeman; the investigating officer, Lt. Crockett (James McEachin), objects to John, Roy, and later Dixie, in treating the suspect with tragic results. Dr. Brackett treats an abused child brought into Rampart; later, the paramedics assist a man who inhaled too much nitrous oxide, treat a boy in anaphylactic shock from a bee sting (Fortunately, Lt. Crockett helps expedite the boy's treatment by taking him into protective custody, when the paramedics are unable to contact the boy's parents.), and aid the victims of a collision between a station wagon automobile and a pickup truck carrying kerosene drums, causing a brush fire.
60	6	"Surprise"	Joseph Pevney	Preston Wood	October 19, 1974	40606
The firefighters and paramedics assist a woman thrown accidentally from her husband's motorcycle onto a cactus patch. John, Roy, and the Rampart medical staff plan a surprise birthday party for Dixie, but when she breaks her ankle while shopping, the party plans and the ER begin to fall apart. So Dixie tells an incompetent nurse (Dena Dietrich) that she will have to work the entire shift for the rest of the week, when she has been ordered to get some foot therapy. Rescues include two men trapped on the side of a building with a 1/2-ton sign hanging near them; a man trapped in his new sauna after passing out, whom the doctors find to be suffering from Addison's disease; and an old woman whose apartment building explodes during a gas leak–with John inside. John then suffers a broken foot. While recovering, Dr. Brackett brings along his first surprise for John–the recuperated Dixie, who, in turn, has brought John a piece of cake, while Dr. Early gives John a tape recorder, in honor of his and Roy's teacher's birthday.
61	7	"Daisy's Pick"	Don Richardson	John Groves	November 2, 1974	40617
Dixie hears so much about a new nurse at Rampart, known as Daisy, and the firefighters, especially Johnny, are all competing for a date with her. Later, the firefighters find an engineer literally frozen in refrigeration equipment, and an old-time sailor (John Carradine) who got both hands stuck in cyanoacrylate adhesive he used on his model ship. A boy who may be suffering from Tay–Sachs disease is found comatose, and gets support from Dr. Brackett, Dixie and Johnny, in the hospital, and the paramedics rescue a man trapped in a theater fire.
62	8	"Quicker Than the Eye"	Don Richardson	Arthur Weiss	November 9, 1974	40604
A pregnant woman (Suzy Spitz) is accidentally shot through the abdomen, and her husband (Mark Spitz) is incoherent and unable to advise how far along she is, when Dr. Brackett seriously asks him. The firefighters decide to get even with Chet for his recent antics. The paramedics assist a construction worker caught under a boat at a filming location, but he refuses any IVs or needles; and a man in a motorbike accident can only move his right thumb, which he uses to help the paramedics find his son, who is in a trailer a half-mile away and in a diabetic coma, before Dixie, Dr. Early, John and Roy, all treat them, in the hospital.
63	9	"Foreign Trade"	James Gavin	Rick Mittleman	November 16, 1974	40613
John wants to trade his vehicle for Roy's convertible. The paramedics help a fraternity pledge choking on raw liver as a hazing stunt. Dixie declares war on the new hospital administrator for reducing staff due to budget cuts, then is offered a promotion to Nursing Supervisor; she later rejects the promotion. Dr. Early's young patient cures his hiccups with soda pop. The firefighters assist a basketball player (Hall of Famer Kareem Abdul-Jabbar) when he is stuck in his luxury car, and a hot rod Chevrolet El Camino crashes through a drawbridge gate and teeters on the edge of the structure.
64	10	"Camera Bug"	Richard Bennett	Rick Mittleman	November 23, 1974	40603
John takes up photography and constantly pesters Roy for candid shots. The firemen assist a teenager suffering from smoke inhalation during a fire at a school he does not attend; he then becomes violent and attacks Dr. Brackett till Dr. Morton and the boy's mother calm him down. A woman is bitten by a scorpion. A fellow fireman mistakes a heart attack for stomach problems brought on by his chili, and a truck driver hauling twenty dynamite boxes is pinned in his vehicle when it catches fire. Dixie and Dr. Brackett assist in the delivery of a baby at a restaurant during their lunch hour.
65	11	"The Firehouse Four"	Joseph Pevney	John Groves	November 30, 1974	40618
The station, except Roy, is entering the firefighters's barbershop quartet contest. Johnny explains his dilemma to Dixie, but his problem is with Roy, who says it takes a lot of work, whom they will all side with him. In between practices, the firemen have to render almost-constant assistance to a man (Lennie Weinrib) who is trying various ways to exercise while on a crash diet and a woman overdosed on sleeping pills with glutethimide.
66	12	"Details"	Georg Fenady	Michael Norell	December 7, 1974	40615
John talks about settling down after another date goes wrong. Station 51 is responding to a traffic accident; en route, another accident occurs and Squad 51 has to handle it before responding to the other accident; one is dead, two are injured, and the injured man (Walter Brooke) asks about his wife, who was badly burned. The woman hit in the first accident takes a shine to John. A man is suffering from watching too many medical TV shows instead of stomach cancer. A belly dancer (Barbara Nichols) overdoses on diet pills, then flirts with Dr. Early, until Dixie catches her and offers a career change. The paramedics assist a child, who turns out to be a child of one of John's love interests, who has a dog bite after the child bit the dog first, and a victim in a fire that gets so intense that John and Roy have to jump to safety.
67	13	"Parade"	Georg Fenady	Preston Wood	December 21, 1974	40611
Roy and John finally get their old fire engine restored to ride in the California Firefighters Parade. The paramedics try to stop a man (Stanley Adams) from driving with heart problems and cause an accident which kills him; the woman he hit blames herself for his death. Dixie and Dr. Early assists a man having a seizure resulting from hypertension in the ER, while Roy and John help a man having trouble breathing while on a date; he accidentally drank a Mickey meant for his date. Two divorced parents fight over their child's medical condition; this leads Dr. Brackett to seek help from them. Dixie takes care of the child's wrist. En route to the parade, John and Roy notice a fire and are the first responders, in the old fire engine.
68	14	"The Bash"	Christian I. Nyby II	Preston Wood	December 28, 1974	40620
An actor (Adam West) is trapped on a film set by a bear, after John and Roy save him, he invites them to a bash, and Gage goes about trying to get Roy to "dress to the nines" for it; while there, the paramedics resuscitate a musician who had received an electric shock on his microphone. Dr. Brackett treats a man suffering from trichinosis linked to bear meat. A bomb blast injures two men.
69	15	"Transition"	Georg Fenady	John Groves	January 4, 1975	40621
John's high school classmate is assigned as Squad 51's new trainee, and Dixie escorts John to him. The firefighters rescue a man trapped in his kitchen by a hydrogen sulfide explosion. An accident near Rampart brings three victims into the ER; with limited capacity, the paramedics jump in to help, and the trainee's inexperience shows. A child has an injured nose at an amusement park go-kart track; later at the same park, a man having a heart attack is trapped on the Sky Ride. Later, a man thought to be intoxicated was actually bitten by a cobra; Roy is subsequently sprayed in the eyes with the cobra's venom and temporarily blinded.
70	16	"Smoke Eater"	Joseph Pevney	Edwin Self	January 11, 1975	40619
An "old school" captain (John Anderson) replaces a vacationing Capt. Stanley and immediately runs into a conflict with the paramedics, as he does not feel they should be practicing medicine. An elderly man falls asleep smoking and sets his chair on fire. Dr. Early and Roy want an apple out of the vending machine, but keeps getting oranges, as had John. Dixie bops her hips into the vending machine and she's the only one to get an apple. The paramedics fight to keep a heart-attack victim alive. A boy with asthma gets trapped in a storm drain. A biker (Sid Haig) screams at Dixie to get a bandage for a head injury and, after he punches Dr. Brackett, the latter, in retaliation, knocks him (the biker) out. The firefighters encounter ethyl bromide fumes when fighting a fire inside a lab.
71	17	"Kidding"	Wesley J. McAfee	Roland Wolpert	January 18, 1975	40605
Johnny is assigned to conduct a tour of Rampart with several very inquisitive fifth-graders. A Vietnam War veteran thought to be suffering from PTSD is holding his wife (Laurette Spang) at knifepoint; after the paramedics subdue him, the ER doctors determine he has a brain tumor. A woman gets stuck in a dog door. A famous novelist (Paul Fix) attempts suicide because he feels the new generation does not know him, but when John's tour encounters the author, he is surprised by the kids. Dixie tells Johnny that she used to watch a movie based on one of the author's books, although she insists the books are better. A cargo plane crashes in a residential area, hitting a school bus with ten children aboard.
72	18	"Prestidigitation"	Christian I. Nyby II	Robert Hamner	January 25, 1975	40616
After the paramedics rescue a magician trapped in his trunk, he gives Roy and John a magic orb. Dr. Brackett’s father (James Gregory) is treated at the hospital for phlebitis. Later the paramedics assist a man injured when his home fireplace explodes on him, the firefighters help when an auto accident causes a power transformer to land in a man's bed, and they rescue a woman trapped when her car collides with a fuel truck and sparks a fire.
73	19	"It's How You Play the Game"	Joseph Pevney	Jim Carlson	February 1, 1975	40609
Johnny makes a bet with Squad 36 that the loser of their softball game at the firemen's picnic pays for the entire picnic, which angers the firehouse until Chet becomes their pitcher after their regular pitcher breaks his arm. In rescuing a drunk man from a car accident, the man punches Johnny in the nose; he then throws a witty remark to Dixie, who herself, reveals, threw one at an unruly man. When two more people come into the ER with the same symptoms, the cause is traced to lead poisoning from moonshine; later the man making the illegal brew sets fire to the place and the firefighters have to rescue him. The paramedics also save a famous car dealer (Dennis Patrick) trapped inside one of his cars with a tiger while filming a commercial and a man with back problems stuck in his waterbed.
74	20	"The Mouse"	Christian I. Nyby II	Edwin Self	February 8, 1975	40626
The firefighters rescue an elderly man from his burning house. Chet is determined to exterminate a mouse in the station. A man (Ronnie Schell) is continually going into cardiac arrest and the doctors try to find a reason. An elderly woman is brought in with breathing problems, and Dixie comforts her worried husband. Roy and John help break up a barfight, then join several fire companies in putting out a blaze caused by a jet fighter crashing into an apartment house; John is injured in an explosion and one of the Pasadena firefighters goes in to rescue him.
75	21	"Back-Up"	Georg Fenady	John Groves	February 15, 1975	40623
Two young men dump off a female OD victim at the ER, then run away; further examination showed she was injected with milk. Gage gets upset at all the non-emergency calls they get, then sees a man (Keenan Wynn) falsifying a back injury for a free ride to the hospital. The paramedics help an ex-Los Angeles Rams player who kicked his TV screen when his old team blew a close game and received an electrical shock. The ER is being visited by administrators, during which time Dixie is swamped with so many issues, including a woman who complains about waiting two hours with a cigarette burn. Roy and John respond to a non-emergency while another squad 15 minutes away is called to a cardiac victim from which Squad 51 is only two minutes away–after responding to the cardiac case the paramedics are involved in a traffic accident in the ambulance en route to Rampart. With no replacement ambulance available for 15 minutes, Engine 51 comes to the rescue to transport the patient who then goes into full cardiac arrest. He is brought into Rampart and, with its hospital administrators looking on, doctors frantically try to save the patient's life.
76	22	"905-Wild"	Jack Webb	Buddy Atkinson & Dick Conway	March 1, 1975	40622
John and Roy find a surprise–a Bengal tiger–when assisting a man down in a grocery store; Animal Control is called in on a 905-Wild (Wild Animal Loose-Threatening) and the officers (Mark Harmon and Albert Popwell) help get the tiger out. The officers later check an animal preserve compound and find several animals in worst situations: hungry, thirsty, dead and missing. Later, a big brush fire threatens a suburban canyon area with numerous domesticated animals and their owners and things get dicey all around for the fire department and the animal control personnel. Then a senior man's pet African pygmy goat with cardiac problems was brought into Rampart General Hospital by the Animal Control officers over Dr. Brackett's objections. Note: This was a backdoor pilot episode for an unmade spin-off series.

=== Season 5 (1975–76) ===
- Note: Mike Stoker was credited as Firefighter Specialist Stoker starting with Episode 1 of this season
- A new set of titles was introduced for this season.

No. overall	No. in season	Title	Directed by	Written by	Original release date	Script order
77	1	"The Stewardess"	Christian I. Nyby II	Preston Wood	September 13, 1975	42805
Roy and John are on a return flight to Los Angeles when John meets and falls for a stewardess/flight attendant (Gretchen Corbett); during the flight, one of the passengers suffers from a heart attack, and the paramedics retrieve their equipment from the cargo bay to help the victim. After landing, John tries to get a date with the stewardess. The firefighters assist a victim of a motorcycle accident and of a chemical fire, while at Rampart, Dixie and Dr. Early treat a young man with broken ribs, who later proves also to have epilepsy.
78	2	"The Old Engine Cram"	Dennis Donnelly	Preston Wood	September 20, 1975	42802
During a drill using sulfur trioxide, a firefighter is injured and Roy is exposed to the toxic, corrosive fumes. Dixie shows an ad to John and Roy about someone wanting to buy an old fire engine just like theirs; later, they help a man who injures his back doing stunts on his motorcycle. Dixie and Dr. Morton treat a boy with a sore throat while his mother begs for an antibiotic–but it turns out that the boy has polio. The firefighters and paramedics help a man who has a heart attack at their own station, and the United States Coast Guard (CG 1442) med-evacks the paramedics to rescue a man who fell off a cliff on Catalina Island.
79	3	"Election"	Bruce Bilson	John Groves	September 27, 1975	42803
Roy and John become candidates to represent Station 51 on the welfare committee. The firefighters first save a man who got his arm stuck in a drainpipe, then his brother (Cliff Osmond), who swallows a beverage-can pull tab and aspirates. A woman seems more concerned with making a plane flight than her son, admitted with Reye syndrome, where Dixie and Dr. Morton encourage Dr. Brackett to ask the parents to making that decision for their son. A sculptor (Sharon Gless) calls the Squad to get her model out of a plaster cast which could otherwise suffocate the model, then the firefighters save a construction worker trapped on a crane.
80	4	"Equipment"	Kevin Tighe	Robert Hamilton	October 4, 1975	42808
Johnny works overtime at Squad 8 and is reunited with his old training partner Stone (Lloyd Haynes), who is now Captain of Station 8. A construction worker dies from a heart attack due to the Squad being unavailable for 10 minutes. Johnny and Stone are devastated after the man dies. Back at Station 51, the firefighters check a water flow alarm and an explosion occurs, injuring Chet. At Rampart, Dixie calls and asks the X-Ray lab regarding Dr. Early admitting Chet, who needs evaluation. A tree surgeon is hit by a tree and suffers a collapsed lung. The Squad then assists a boy who fell from a tree due to being exposed to Rocky Mountain spotted fever from a tick, and a fire at a fireworks warehouse injures Roy.
81	5	"The Inspection"	Georg Fenady	Bruce Johnson	October 11, 1975	42807
Capt. Stanley makes the station aware of an impending inspection by the Battalion Chief and the County Supervisor. A heart transplant patient is having pains and his wife (Jeanne Cooper) thinks her husband (Warren Berlinger) no longer loves her. A parachutist gets stuck on an electric tower during a stunt being filmed by a radio disc jockey (Wolfman Jack), Dr. Brackett and Dixie treat a veterinarian (Roger Bowen) who had been bitten by a boxer, while Roy and John, in the field, help a traffic accident victim who goes into shock due to internal bleeding caused by a broken hip and pelvis, before Dixie and Drs. Brackett and Early help the victim in the hospital.
82	6	"The Indirect Method"	Joel Oliansky	Michael Norell	October 18, 1975	42804
When Roy and John have a new, hard-nosed, female paramedic trainee (Elayne Heilveil), she rides with them to help a man whose wife is holed up in a house scheduled for demolition due to freeway construction, a man who tries to commit suicide by gas, then changes his mind and suffers a head injury, and another man suffering a heart attack that they try to revive. The trainee expresses her inability to function to Dixie, but she redeems herself after Roy is electrocuted trying to save an invalid at a structure fire and she is the only one to assist with reviving him.
83	7	"Pressure 165"	Georg Fenady	Edwin Self	October 25, 1975	42810
The paramedics are med-evacked to Catalina Island by Coast Guard helicopter to assist in a scuba diving accident, where the patient is treated in a hyperbaric chamber. They coordinate with Dr. Early at Rampart, when the diver suffers a heart attack. After Chet gives Johnny a hard time about his cooking skills, the Squad investigates a kitchen fire at a famous chef's home. A youth suffers a serious gunshot wound that may leave him paralyzed and end his days as a dancer. He grows very hostile with Drs. Brackett and Early. The firefighters assist with victims of a structure fire that resulted in a dust explosion.
84	8	"One of Those Days"	Wes McAfee	Claire Whitaker	November 1, 1975	42817
It really is "one of those days" when Roy and John walk into a family brawl when the mother-in-law feigns a sick stomach to stay at her son's home, then assist a drunk in a hotel with a broken elevator. A young boy suffers a seizure in the ER; as Dixie and Dr. Early suspects meningitis, Dr. Brackett asks the mother (Marla Adams) about the boy's medical history, but she proves to be more interested in petition drives than in her own son. The firefighters reach a two-car accident but find that the victims have disappeared. When Roy and John treat a man who had fallen in the bathtub, they find something more serious; later, they rescue a child trapped in a burning building.
85	9	"The Lighter-Than-Air Man"	Joseph Pevney	Preston Wood	November 15, 1975	42801
A crossing guard (Arthur O'Connell, in his final role) is run down, allegedly by Squad 51 en route to an emergency labor, and is investigated by the police in a second appearance by Lt. Crockett (James McEachin). The guard is later revealed to be a malingerer thanks to some careful detective work by Crockett. A couple en route to a wedding hits a fire hydrant. A camper on fire arrives at Station 51 with a boy trapped inside, and is taken to Rampart with smoke inhalation and burns, with the help of Dixie, Drs. Early, and Morton. The firefighters and paramedics rescue the driver of a semi truck hauling insecticide that overturned and caught fire on the freeway, sending toxic fumes into the air.
86	10	"Simple Adjustment"	Dennis Donnelly	Robert Hamilton	November 22, 1975	42812
The paramedics are swamped with paperwork, and have to deal with emergencies such as a girl (Elisabeth Brooks) trapped in an overturned car, a beautician who OD'd on diet pills, to all of whom Dixie, Drs. Early and Morton tend, an elderly man who has taken ill, and workers stuck on a ship while on fire. Aneta Corsaut guest stars as Sheila
87	11	"Tee Vee"	Christian I. Nyby II	John Groves	November 29, 1975	42813
When the station tries to watch a news report on the firefighters, John and Chet blow up the television receiver after attempting a repair which Dixie inadvertently suggests to John and Roy. The firefighters rescue a man from a burning manhole; Dr. Brackett receives an aquarium he had not ordered, and later, he has a toxic reaction to a catfish bite. Dr. Morton treats a man with a bleeding peptic ulcer. The paramedics later help a man who had glued his own eyes closed and rescue a man trapped in his home from a mudslide caused by a gas explosion.
88	12	"On Camera"	Christian I. Nyby II	Claire Whitaker & Rod Peterson	December 6, 1975	42815
A camera crew follows Squad 51 around as a teenager is bitten by a baby Mojave rattlesnake (which the reporter gave the bag to Dixie, who was shocked), a would-be stuntman dangles from an I-beam, a brush fire turns out to be a barbecue fire (while the picnickers are playing chess in a van), a boy who fell off a cliff, and a man trapped under a truck while tar burns all around him.
89	13	"Communications"	Dennis Donnelly	Mark Saha	December 13, 1975	42809
A young worker (Craig Huxley) gets his arm caught in a record machine; Dr. Brackett and Dixie go on-site to aid the boy. A communication mix-up between Squad 51 and Rampart reveals issues with transmissions between two squads and a discrepancy in how a patient was treated. Dixie and Dr. Morton treat a young violinist, who had injured his arm and has a fear of needles. Two underage boys get a car trapped on the roof of a house. In the field, a woman attempts suicide by OD'ing on sleeping pills but refuses aid until she passes out; in the hospital, as Dixie relays to Roy and Johnny, after hearing it from Dr. Early, she dies. Chet literally sets a pair of skis on fire. A man is trapped underneath a car, which then explodes in their garage with Roy and Johnny inside.
90	14	"To Buy or Not to Buy"	Georg Fenady	Keith A. Walker	December 20, 1975	42806
When Roy thinks about buying a house, he delays too long, thus it's Johnny who ends up buying it. Responding to a structure fire, the firefighters find two children trapped on the second floor, one of whom is in a diabetic coma; Roy is injured during the rescue. Two female student drivers are involved in a minor collision, but one is more concerned with Roy cutting her cashmere sweater than her health. Another traffic accident results in two injuries and a missing dog, whom Roy found for the boy, in the hospital, prior to Dixie and Dr. Early wrapping a cast on the boy's arm. A teenage epileptic is stranded on a concrete beam under a bridge.
91	15	"Right at Home"	Georg Fenady	Preston Wood	January 10, 1976	42821
Dr. Brackett rides along with Copter 10, where he assists, along with the paramedics, in the rescue of a boy and his father from their overturned camper. Dixie encourages Roy to take the boy in as a foster parent, since the boy's mother is out of state, and the boy causes trouble both at home and at the station. When another young boy is brought into the ER and is diagnosed with spinal meningitis, Dr. Early talks to the mother (Peggy Stewart) in case surgery is needed. The firefighter rescue a man from a structure fire, but not before he sustains severe burns on both legs.
92	16	"The Girl on the Balance Beam"	Christian I. Nyby II	Robert Hamilton	January 17, 1976	42818
A teen-aged Olympic hopeful is injured when she falls off a balance beam. The firefighters rescue a woman trapped on a wire at a movie studio, drunk driver (Ronnie Schell) of a traffic accident, and people trapped in a fire at a rail yard which involves ammonium nitrate.
93	17	"Involvement"	Dennis Donnelly	John Groves	January 24, 1976	42820
Dixie's predecessor, old friend and a former Rampart head nurse (Anne Seymour), tries to commit suicide by OD'ing on antidepressants and catches her house on fire. In the hospital, she befriends a paraplegic child (Dawn Lyn) who almost drowned in a swimming pool. The paramedics help a woman who fainted after wrapping her body in plastic to treat her cellulite, a family suffering from carbon monoxide poisoning from a new furnace installation, and a man trapped in his sportscar pinned underneath a trailer tanker truck laden with leaking liquid hydrogen.
94	18	"Above and Beyond...Nearly"	Christian I. Nyby II	Preston Wood	January 31, 1976	42823
Roy and John receive commendations for bravery, also receive congratulations from Dixie and Dr. Early, as well as her nursing staff, but neither Roy nor John remembers the rescue that resulted in the commendations. Dr. Early makes a comment to John about his undetailed letter. Then the paramedics assist a 94-year-old man (Liam Dunn) with a broken ankle from dancing, and join Copter 10 in rescuing an injured mountain man stranded on a cliff with assistance from a special Fire Department truck equipped with floodlights for night-time operations. Dixie, Drs. Brackett and Early treat a man who passed out in a dentist's chair. Guest appearance by Los Angeles County Fire Chief Richard Houts to explain typo, commendation meant for Squad 15.
95	19	"Grateful"	Georg Fenady	Michael Norell	February 7, 1976	42819
Johnny and Roy rescue a couple (Dick Van Patten and Ruth Buzzi) from under a car crashed inside an Italian restaurant; these then proceed to hang around Station 51. An elderly man performs CPR on his friend, before being done by Dixie and Dr. Early, but he causes more harm than good. The paramedics assist a boy struck in the eye by a BB gun, then rescue victims of a boat fire after they return from a false alarm with Copter 10.
96	20	"The Great Crash Diet"	Joseph Pevney	Timothy Burns	February 21, 1976	42822
Roy and John rescue a man stuck in a fish tank at an aquarium. Dr. Morton conducts an experiment on firefighter nutrition, but it turns into an obsession with Chet. A teenager celebrates his birthday by eating two loaves of raw dough and suffers a painful stomach ache. John reveals to Dixie a picture of a baby, weighing 8 ounces. The station responds to a woman having chest pains when her pregnant daughter suddenly goes into labor. The station responds to a traffic accident, during which Capt. Stanley is severely injured when he gets an electric shock from a fallen power line, forcing his apparent immediate deputy (Michael Stoker) to take over for Stanley and direct Stanley's rescue.
97	21	"The Tycoons"	Georg Fenady	Robert Hamilton, Mark Massari and John Groves	February 28, 1976	42816
The station responds to a fire that proves to be in a trash dumpster. John gets everyone but Roy excited about buying into a nearby hot dog stand, which burns down just as Roy shows interest. A man suffers a heart wound from a nail shot from a power lawn mower; before he undergoes surgery, Dr. Brackett tells a man with a gunshot wound to his right leg to save all his reactions for the judge. In the Squad, John and Roy rush a baby who stops breathing, who was taken to Rampart, where Dixie and Dr. Early rush to save her. The firefighters save people trapped in a chemical fire that turns explosive.
98	22	"The Nuisance"	Randolph Mantooth	Robert Hamilton	March 6, 1976	42824
Johnny is the victim of a hit and run driver; while in the hospital, he flirts with his physical therapist (Gretchen Corbett), whom Dixie hires, when Johnny really has a nurse (Carole Cook), who is "out to get him." The station gets a replacement who is difficult to work with. Dr. Early explains to Roy that his partner is a good paramedic at Station 51, who also needs to be a good patient at Rampart. Note: Robert Fuller does not appear in this episode.

=== Season 6 (1976–77) ===
Note: In the final season, Drs. Brackett and Early now have the additional certification of "A.C.E.P." Ms. McCall now exchanges her occasional nurse's dress for a uniform and no longer wears a nurse's cap. Gage and DeSoto now have the designation "Firefighter PM" after their name. Robert Fuller also reduces his on-screen appearances, for the last several episodes of the final season.

The intro now includes the radio transmissions between Rampart and the paramedics and no music. The transmissions, transcribed, read as follows:
Station alarm, followed by sirens, fading into:

1. Dispatcher Sam Lanier: "Fifty-One, informant reports toxic chemicals are stored in tanker. Use caution." An explosion follows.
2. Brackett: "Squad Fifty-One, this is Rampart; can you send me some EKG?"
3. Gage: "10-4; transmitting EKG, we're sending you a strip, vitals to follow. (Pause.) Pulse is one-sixty; the victim is in extreme pain, Rampart." (Beeping, as though to alert a doctor.)
4. DeSoto: "Patient is in V-fib! Rampart, we have lost the victim's pulse! Beginning CPR! (A series of beeps.) We're defibrillating victim, Rampart! (Pause.) Rampart, we've defibrillated victim; he's in sinus rhythm."
5. Early: "Administer two amps sodium bicarb and insert an airway. (Pause.) Start an IV Fifty-One, lactated Ringer's."
6. McCall: "Squad Fifty-One, continue monitoring vitals and transport immediately."
7. Gage: "We're on our way, Rampart!"

When the show was put into syndication, the title sequence from Season six was used in all episodes.

No. overall	No. in season	Title	Directed by	Written by	Original release date	Script order
99	1	"The Game"	Christian I. Nyby II	Christian I. Nyby II	September 25, 1976	44906
Squad 51 is assigned to work the game at the Los Angeles Memorial Coliseum between the USC Trojans and the visiting Stanford Cardinal, where they deal with a choking victim, a man with breathing difficulties, an injured photographer, and a TV announcer with heart trouble. After John and Roy have not been watching the game enough, Dr. Brackett and Dixie cut them out of Rampart. Meanwhile, a woman accidentally pulls her husband off the roof into a tree.
100	2	"Not Available"	Cliff Bole	Preston Wood	October 2, 1976	44912
Roy and John complain about the rule that forbids squads from crossing each other's territories. This had delayed their arrival on the scene where a heart patient had almost reached the point of death while the squad assigned to that area dealt with a hypochondriac, after John was speaking to Dr. Brackett about this. Later, they respond to a traffic accident while transporting a non-emergency patient due to the responding Squad being 20 minutes away. An elderly woman demands an "older doctor" to see her; later, when Dr. Brackett visits, while Dixie is around, who asks that she needs to lay back quietly and rest, her daughter has a heart attack. An escaped prisoner gets trapped on a ledge.
101	3	"The Unlikely Heirs"	Georg Fenady	Timothy Burns	October 9, 1976	44904
Chet and Firefighter Marco Lopez find $80,000 in a transient's (Paul Brinegar) mattress after rescuing him from a fire, who later tries to give the firemen a reward. A bride faints while walking down the aisle after suffering from Labyrinthitis, which postpones a honeymoon to Africa. But Dixie proposes they marry in the hospital. Later, Dixie administers a tetanus shot to a young boy. The firefighters help an elderly woman find her lost cat, then assist victims when a plane crashes into a warehouse.
102	4	"That Time of Year"	Dennis Donnelly	Edward Robak & Mort Thaw	October 23, 1976	44905
When Roy is unable to decide where to go on vacation, Dixie finds the perfect vacation made especially for his family. (The vacation itself has disastrous results for the DeSotos.) During a fire at a singles club, Roy becomes dizzy going in to find someone who may have been inside, but was outside with his date (Linda Gray). A self-defense instructor is injured by one of his elderly students, a man (Ronnie Schell) who developed sudden abdominal pains after proposing to his girlfriend is brought into Rampart, of whom Dixie, Drs. Early and Morton are all taking care. The firefighters rescue two hang glider pilots from the face of a cliff.
103	5	"Fair Fight"	Kevin Tighe	Preston Wood	October 30, 1976	44903
The firemen walk in to a guest–a droopy-eyed Basset Hound–and he becomes the new mascot named "Henry;" he replaces Boot, who had died in 1975. The firefighters respond to an industrial fire and check a Top Secret room for victims–and a lot of questions from the employees about the contents of the room. "Therapeutic arguing" between a married couple leads to escalating violence and worsening injuries to both parties, and John is trapped in a cave-in trying to rescue two injured workers.
104	6	"Rules of Order"	Georg Fenady	James G. Richardson	November 6, 1976	44907
Roy and Johnny are asked to be part of a paramedic advisory committee, which also includes their least favorite paramedic, Craig Brice (James G. Richardson), who proceeds to conduct the meeting formally under parliamentary procedures, a conversation in which Dixie observes from Roy and Johnny, who tells them to learn more. A vehicle accident injures two line workers, one severe enough to require a tracheotomy which Dixie, Drs. Brackett and Early perform. The firefighters rescue a stunt climber from the side of a building.
105	7	"The Exam"	Richard Bennett	Tom Egan	November 13, 1976	44911
Roy and John are concerned about their paramedic re-certification exam; Dixie asks Dr. Brackett to put together the exam at least part of the way. Molly (Bridget Hanley), a fireman's widow, calls for help for her daughter, Jeanine, who got her head stuck in a table, and John is concerned about her calling them for minor things, until Jeanine has a really bad fall. An accident on a movie set turns deadly.
106	8	"Captain Hook"	Christian I. Nyby II	Susan J. Alenick	November 20, 1976	44909
The firemen plan to celebrate the retirement of the "C" shift captain with a party disguised as a farewell dinner. Later, they help a model wearing a bear suit for a promotional stunt suffering from heat stroke, convince a family their mother is actually sleeping instead of dead, and rescue CHP officers from a downed helicopter on the rocks at the ocean's edge, at the bottom of a cliff.
107	9	"Computer Terror"	Georg Fenady	Bruce Shelly	December 4, 1976	44917
The county payroll computer erroneously sends John a paycheck for $5,900 instead of $590, and vows to return his incorrect check only when the county sends him a correct check. He then asks Dixie to use the hospital's phone to justify his situation. Otherwise, the firefighters aid a homeless person who is accidentally crushed in a car at a junkyard, a man injured by the family dog who gives Roy and John fits–including sending Roy into the pool, and two workers caught on a scaffold.
108	10	"Welcome to Santa Rosa County"	Christian I. Nyby II	Preston Wood	December 25, 1976	44916
Roy and Johnny spend a fishing vacation in rural Santa Rosa County. But their recreation time is interrupted when they rescue two climbers who fell onto a cliff face and victims of a fishing boat explosion, then find themselves having to help the sheriff develop a paramedic program in the county.
109	11	"Paperwork"	Georg Fenady	John Groves	January 8, 1977	44913
Capt. Stanley assigns Kelly and Lopez to fix numerous incident reports which the computer had rejected. A man runs his car into a fire hydrant; when he leaves his son alone to call for help, the son nearly drowns by falling into a storm drain. In a complicated issue for Squad 51 to get the supplies, Dixie announces to Johnny, Rampart has a supply nurse, who puts Roy and Johnny, in an intolerable situation. The paramedics help a college janitor with stomach pains after drinking Mesoptamia-era wine and two people trapped in a warehouse fire.
110	12	"Loose Ends"	Dennis Donnelly	Dee Murphey	January 15, 1977	44908
Dixie stops by Station 51 and Johnny is unable to sell her tickets to the Firemen's Picnic, where the top seller gets a trip to Las Vegas. The firefighters respond to a traffic accident in which Dr. Brackett is involved–which resulted in one death, for which Dr. Brackett blames himself, and he refuses Dixie's requests to rest. When the squad breaks down in an alley, they find themselves in an undercover operation with the police and aid a detective suffering from an angina attack. Later, the firefighters rescue two victims of a dock fire complicated by a box car full of flammable ammonia.
111	13	"An Ounce of Prevention"	Christian I. Nyby II	Edward Robak & Mort Thaw	January 22, 1977	44914
The firefighters assist a man with chest pains, and a young man who gets trapped trying to help him, while stuck on a ferris wheel. Roy and John are scheduled to appear on TV to discuss fire prevention, then help a child who swallowed parathion, and Dr. Brackett speaks with both parents about how their son got into the illegal pesticide, while Dixie treats a woman. During their TV appearance, Roy and John become first responders to a real-life emergency when a stagehand suffers an electric shock from a live wire.
112	14	"Insanity Epidemic"	Randolph Mantooth	Robert Hamilton	February 5, 1977	44901
Capt. Stanley is unnerved that his former captain, a certain McConnike, is now his Battalion Chief, and the station is concerned about his increasing paranoia. Chet tries to get Henry off the station couch into a doghouse. The carelessness of a gas station owner and attendant, compounded by a driver's anger, leads to a fire. Dr. Brackett becomes increasingly angry at a new hospital administrator, constantly moving meetings around. A young wife accidentally shoots her older husband in the chest with a nail gun; while the doctors are treating him, Dixie is forced to prevent his young wife from seeing him. The firefighters have to break up two clowns fighting at an ice rink and rescue two young girls whose car slid off the freeway and crashed into a truck loaded with pesticides.
113	15	"Breakdown"	Georg Fenady	John Groves	February 12, 1977	44902
Squad 51 experiences sporadic electrical problems which delays responses, and the fire department mechanic is not happy that he was not consulted before Johnny and Roy try to fix it. Two weavers living without modern amenities are told to cut back their shrubbery, but later the wife becomes ill with the "Woolsorter's Disease" strain of anthrax. The paramedics rescue a man trapped at the top of a tower.
114	16	"Family Ties"	Cliff Bole	Michael Raschella & Carole Raschella	February 19, 1977	44910
Roy is not looking forward to the annual visit from his mother-in-law. The paramedics assist two victims of an auto accident. Drs. Brackett and Early both argue about attending a convention in Acapulco; Dixie must encourage Dr. Brackett to go there with Dr. Early. An elderly man suffers stomach pains from drinking an elixir made from 50% alcohol, who refuses to listen to Dr. Early's orders, wants to get his pants back, but not until both Dixie and Dr. Early had told him to do exactly as he said. A candy striper carelessly places a bottle of alcohol above a clock radio which spills out, and the ensuing fire sends the patient in the room into respiratory arrest. A boy’s model rocket sparks a house fire, with the dispatch process shown in some detail.
115	17	"Bottom Line"	Dennis Donnelly	Robert Bralver & Charlene Bralver	February 26, 1977	44915
Responding to a man with back pain, Roy and Johnny question Dixie about the over-cautious Dr. Morton's judgment in handling patients. A man comes into Rampart with phosphorus burns on his arm, eventually being taken care of by Drs. Brackett, Morton and Dixie; later, a young boy is brought in after being hit in the head by a baseball, before Dixie and Dr. Brackett talk to the boy's coach. The paramedics help a man with trouble breathing, then his neighbor nearly drowns in a hot tub while the paramedics do an IV on the first victim. LASD Deputy/Carson Police Officer Vincent "Vince" Howard is involved in a traffic accident which leaves one man dead and two injured, including Officer Howard, who begins pointing his loaded gun at Johnny in a delusional belief that Johnny and Roy are helping his prisoner to escape.
116	18	"Firehouse Quintet"	Georg Fenady	Christian I. Nyby II	March 5, 1977	44919
The Station 51 basketball team makes the semi-finals; during practice for the big game, however, they treat an injured gymnast, then have numerous emergencies before the game, include rescuing victims at a gas explosion, and a workman trapped at a studio. Joanna Kerns is listed as Joanna Devarona in this episode.
117	19	"The Boat"	Georg Fenady	Hannah Shearer	March 12, 1977	44926
Charlie (the mechanic from "Breakdown") stores his speedboat he is attempting to sell at the station; the firefighters decide to chip in to buy it. Roy and John are med-evacked via Coast Guard helicopter to rescue two boaters from Catalina Island. The firefighters help a bookie who is having a heart attack trying to answer multiple ringing phones before Dr. Brackett and Dixie treat him. Later, a lab explosion of Sodium azide starts a fire at Rampart, injuring several people, including Dixie, who burns herself.
118	20	"Isolation"	Georg Fenady	John Groves	March 19, 1977	44921
Roy and John are trapped at Station 86 when the only bridge in and out is washed away due to heavy rain. John's date plans are ruined when Dixie persuades him to call his girlfriend. Since they are the only squad in the vicinity, they help two victims of an auto accident, a child suffering from asthmatic bronchitis, an elderly woman with a hip injury, and a man with cardiac problems. A psychiatrist aids the paramedics until Copter 15 transports the victims to the hospital, but a power failure causes problems. Dr. Morton accompanies the paramedics back to Station 86, where they respond to an auto accident with multiple injuries.
119	21	"Limelight"	Christian I. Nyby II	James G. Richardson	March 26, 1977	44923
John gets jealous when Brice (episode writer James G. Richardson) is on the news, then their "favorite paramedic" leads another paramedic meeting in his own parliamentary way. Later, their squad has to rescue Brice from a fire. The firefighters rescue a man's daughter from under a backhoe–then the father goes into cardiac arrest. Drs. Brackett and Morton treat a boy who accidentally shot himself with a BB gun and requires a thoracotomy.
120	22	"Upward and Onward"	Dennis Donnelly	Michael Norell	April 2, 1977	44922
Capt. Stanley is worried his chief's exam will be sabotaged by the current chief, who has a past beef with Stanley. A soap opera doctor (Leon Ames) has real mono and causes drama both on-set with Johnny and Roy, and at Rampart with Dixie and Dr. Early. When Dr. Brackett learns from Dixie, that the producer (Tom Williams) is filming a hospital room with an ill patient without permission, he angrily confronts the producer and demands that everyone get out. Johnny and Roy are stuck in an elevator with a retired doctor (Dabbs Greer) who has a self-diagnosed aortic aneurysm.
121	23	"Hypochondri-Cap"	Dennis Donnelly	Bruce Shelly	April 16, 1977	44924
When Capt. Stanley is in a foul mood because he thinks he has arthritis, Roy talks to Dr. Brackett about it. Roy and John help a man whose fingers are caught in a garage door opener. A woman passes out from inhaling contents from an aerosol can and has an auto accident. Dixie, Brackett, and Early treat a woman who underwent botched plastic surgery. John tests a new type of rope, which fails. He and Roy assist victims of a two-alarm fire at an oil refinery.
122	24	"All Night Long"	Georg Fenady	Kevin Tighe	May 28, 1977	44925
Johnny tries to create his own TV game show. The firefighters assist an elderly musician (Bill Walker) experiencing heart trouble. Dixie explains his diagnosis to his best friend. An auto accident caused by running a stop sign results in three injuries. A tightrope walker gets stuck between two buildings. Note: This is the final episode of the television series. Julie London, Bobby Troup, Randolph Mantooth and Kevin Tighe are the only actors to appear in every episode of the series.

=== Television films (1978–79) ===
Title	Directed by	Written by	Original release date
The Steel Inferno	Georg Fenady	Preston Wood and R.A. Cinader	January 7, 1978
In a plot derived from The Towering Inferno, a high-rise building fire sparked by a carelessly thrown cigarette brings a multi-alarm response from Station 110, assisted by Squad 51. The fire traps several employees, including an office manager (Linda Gray) and her assistant (Anne Lockhart), who is engaged to one of the Squad 110 paramedics. Dr. Brackett leads a triage team from Rampart in a nearby garage. The Coast Guard helicopter is brought in to evacuate the trapped individuals. Dixie and Dr. Early handle the influx of patients at Rampart; while Roy and Johnny extricate themselves from a broken elevator, they also have to rescue an injured firefighter captain from an elevator shaft.
Survival on Charter #220	Christian I. Nyby II	Christian I. Nyby II, Hannah L. Shearer and R.A. Cinader	March 25, 1978
Squad 51 C-shift paramedics rescue a stuntman from a tower. Johnny and Roy respond to treat the injured child of a fireman’s widow. A small plane and a chartered jetliner collide in midair, crashing in a residential neighborhood, trapping Johnny and Roy. Station 18 leads a massive response from Battalion 14 and the Compton Fire Department. Dr. Morton heads up a triage team from Rampart. Multiple rescues include passengers from both planes and people in the subdivision. Dixie and Dr. Early perform brain surgery on the injured child. An elderly man’s dog leads Chief McConnike to its owner. This movie marks the last appearance of the Squad 51 vehicle, as it is apparently buried in, and destroyed by, debris from the plane crash.
Most Deadly Passage	Christian I. Nyby II	Michael Donovan	April 4, 1978
Johnny and Roy are sent to Seattle to study the techniques used there. A skydiver jumps off the Space Needle, a worker is trapped at the top of the Kingdome, and a fuel pumper mistakenly loads a ferry with gasoline instead of diesel fuel, which sets the ferry on fire in the middle of Elliott Bay.
Greatest Rescues of Emergency!	R.A. Cinader	R.A. Cinader	December 31, 1978
When Johnny Gage and Roy DeSoto are both promoted to Captain, at which rank they are no longer permitted to hold paramedic certification, they reminisce about their years working together, along with Dixie and Dr. Early, at Rampart. Flash-back sequences include the rescue of airplane passengers after a crash-landing, a potential suicide threatening to leap from a crane tower, and a girl whose toe is stuck in a faucet. Production inconsistency: another paramedic promoted to Captain in this episode is Craig Brice, Gage and DeSoto's bane, who is portrayed by an African-American actor, whereas the original Brice is white.
What's a Nice Girl Like You Doing	Georg Fenady	Story by : Hannah L. Shearer; Teleplay by : Michael Donovan	June 26, 1979
Johnny and Roy travel to San Francisco, where they observe some topnotch women paramedics in action during major rescue missions. An injured worker is stranded on the Golden Gate Bridge. Ambulance squads treat a heart attack victim at a dance bar and an epileptic in a coffee shop. A bad driver causes a traffic accident involving an ambulance carrying the heart patient, resulting in his death and five other injuries. John dates a nurse who is interested in a long-term relationship. Careless workers and deadly chemicals combine to spark an explosive fire at a pier on the Embarcadero.
The Convention	Georg Fenady	R.A. Cinader & Hannah L. Shearer	July 3, 1979
San Francisco firefighters and paramedics rescue a man caught in an old ship's sail-rigging. A paramedic convention brings John and Roy back to San Francisco. While attending a picnic, SF firefighters and paramedics are called back to work for a mutual aid response in Marin County. Johnny and Roy tag along on a call involving a female prisoner in labor and all end up in the middle of sniper fire and then in a large facility fire.

== Home releases ==
Name	Ep#	Region 1
Season One	12	August 23, 2005
Season Two	21	February 7, 2006
Season Three	22	February 13, 2007
Season Four	22	January 29, 2008
Season Five	22	January 20, 2009
Season Six	24	April 13, 2010
The Final Rescues	6	March 29, 2011
The Complete Series	128	July 12, 2016
