= The Deal (2005 film) =

- Directed by: Harvey Kahn
- Written by: Ruth Epstein
- Produced by: Chris Dorr; Ruth Epstein; Robert Lee; Harvey Kahn
- Starring: Christian Slater; Selma Blair; John Heard; Colm Feore; Angie Harmon
- Narrated by: Donald Sutherland
- Cinematography: Adam Sliwinski
- Edited by: Richard Schwadel
- Music by: Christopher Lennertz
- Production company: Front Street Productions
- Distributed by: Deal Street Pictures Inc.
- Release date: 17 May 2005 (U.S.)
- Running time: 108 minutes
- Countries: Canada; United States
- Languages: English; Russian
- Box office: $20,035

The Deal is a 2005 political thriller film directed by Harvey Kahn, starring Christian Slater, Selma Blair, Robert Loggia and Colm Feore. The movie was filmed in 2004 and based in New York City, New York. The film was released only in limited cinemas in the USA and United Arab Emirates.

== Plot ==
With America at war with Saudi Arabia and in the grip of a crippling fuel crisis, Wall Street analyst Tom Hanson agrees to broker a lucrative deal between a Russian oil cartel and his investment firm's biggest client, led by cold-blooded CEO Jared Tolson. While juggling his growing attraction to newly hired associate, Abbey Gallagher, a Harvard graduate who wants to save the world and has an innovative idea for helping those seeking alternative energy sources further their research. The snake pit of Wall Street is the last place she wants to be, but Gordon convinces her that his company can make her alternative energy dream a reality (because the company can make money by doing so). Tom learns all is not what it seems with the deal. Digging deeper, he and Abbey soon find themselves trapped in a dangerous web of treachery and murder.

== Cast ==
- Christian Slater as Tom Hanson
- Selma Blair as Abbey Gallagher
- Robert Loggia as Jared Tolson
- Colm Feore as Hank Weiss
- David Morrissey as Gordon
- Angie Harmon as Anna
- John Heard as Professor Roseman
- Françoise Yip as Janice Long
- Jim Thorburn as Shane Waller
- Mike Dopud as Theo Gorbov
- Washington State Governor Jay Inslee as Senator Charles Lucas

== Reception ==
The review aggregator website Rotten Tomatoes surveyed 34 critics and, categorizing the reviews as positive or negative, assessed 7 as positive and 27 as negative for a 21 percent rating. Among the reviews, it determined an average rating of 4.50 out of 10. The critics consensus reads "Dense with detail but light on entertainment value, The Deal turns a potentially riveting subject into a sloppily assembled -- and progressively more implausible -- misfire." Most reviews were less than favorable.
