= Sierra (TV series) =

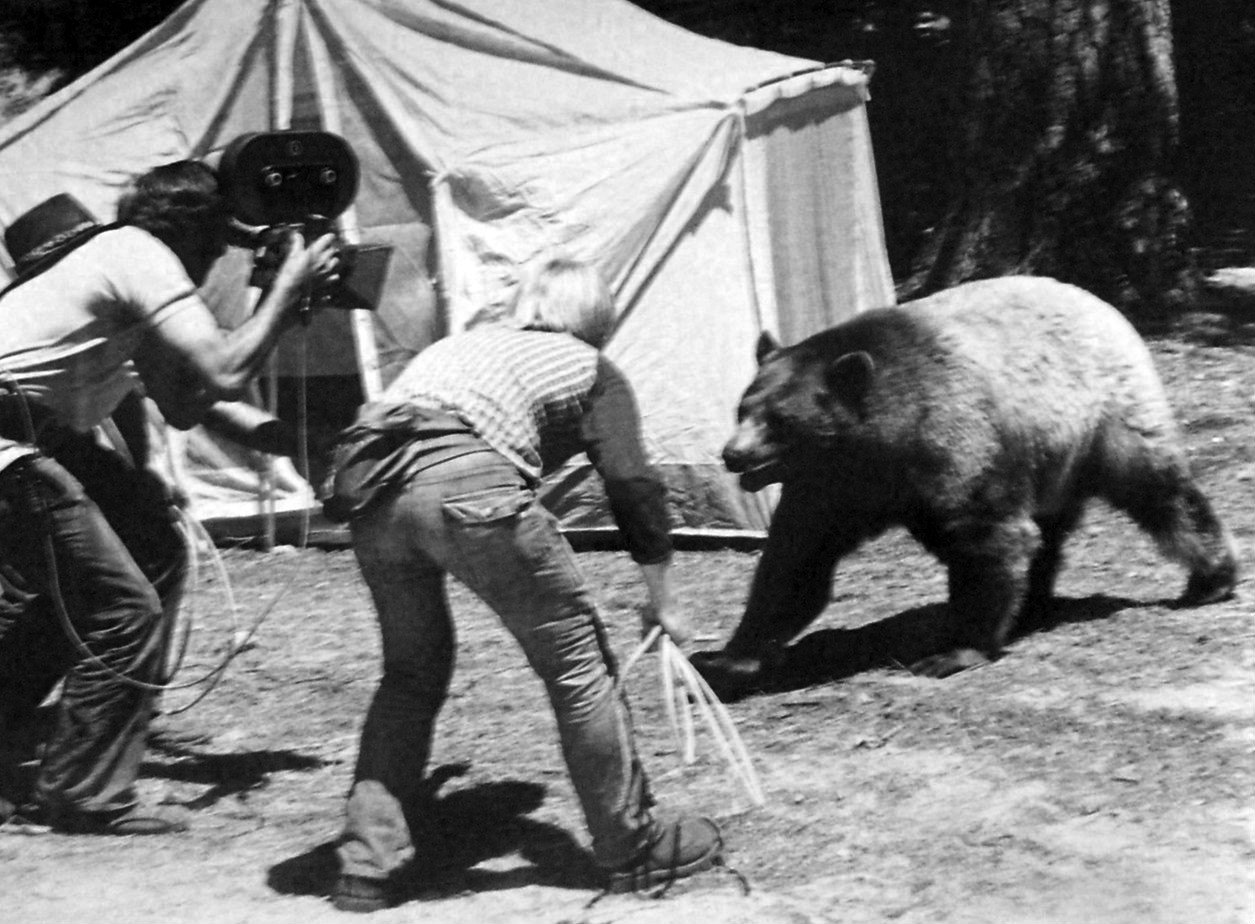
- Behind-the-scenes photo of how Cruncher the bear, a show regular, was filmed.
- Genre: Police drama
- Created by: Jack Webb
- Starring: James G. Richardson; Ernest Thompson; Susan Foster; Jack Hogan; Michael Warren
- Theme music composer: Lee Holdridge; John Denver performed by Denny Brooks
- Composers: John Denver (additional music by); Lee Holdridge (1.1, 1.5)
- Original language: English
- No. of seasons: 1
- No. of episodes: 12 (11 + 1 movie)

Production
- Executive producers: Jack Webb; Robert A. Cinader
- Producer: Bruce Johnson
- Production locations: California (Yosemite Nat. Park); Wyoming
- Camera setup: multi-camera
- Running time: 60 mins.
- Production companies: Mark VII Limited; Universal Television

Original release
- Network: NBC
- Release: September 12 – December 24, 1974

Related
- Emergency!

Sierra is a 1974 television crime drama series focusing on the efforts of National Park Service rangers to enforce federal law and to effect wilderness rescues. The program aired on NBC and was packaged by Jack Webb's Mark VII Limited for Universal Television. The show's theme song was written by Lee Holdridge (music) and John Denver (lyrics). Robert A. Cinader, executive producer of Mark VII's Emergency! (which partially inspired this show), handled this program also.

== Setting ==
The show derived its name from its setting, the fictional Sierra National Park, a part of the U.S. National Park Service. In reality, exteriors were filmed at Yosemite National Park. The tenth episode, "The Urban Rangers", established that the park also existed within the same fictional world populated by the characters of Emergency!, its sister Mark VII show. The two paramedic characters from Emergency!, played by Kevin Tighe and Randolph Mantooth, also appeared in Sierra "The Urban Rangers".

== Cast ==
Like many Mark VII Limited television dramas, the show centered on a pair of leads in a public service job, backed up by a supporting cast of characters from within the same organization. In this case, the leads were James G. Richardson as Ranger Tim Cassidy and Ernest Thompson as Ranger Matt Harper. The cast was rounded out by their boss, Chief Ranger Jack Moore (Jack Hogan), and fellow rangers Julie Beck (Susan Foster) and P. J. Lewis (Michael Warren).

== Episode list ==
=== Season 1 (1974) ===
No.	Title	Original release date
1	"Cruncher"	September 12, 1974
2	"Panic at Cathedral Creek"	September 19, 1974
3	"Taking Cody Winslow"	September 26, 1974
4	"The Poachers"	October 3, 1974
5	"The Urban Rangers"	October 24, 1974
6	"Holiday"	October 31, 1974
7	"Tails, You Lose"	November 7, 1974
8	"The Trek"	November 14, 1974
9	"Time Off"	November 21, 1974
10	"The Giant"	December 5, 1974
11	"The Fawn"	December 12, 1974

=== TV movie (1974) ===
No.	Title	Original release date
12	"The Rangers"	December 24, 1974

== Cancellation ==
The show was cancelled after three months, mainly due to the popularity of The Waltons, which was its direct competition on CBS. The series finale aired on Christmas Eve as a modified version of its previously-unaired pilot episode, The Rangers.
