= Go (1973 TV series) =

- Also known as: Go-U.S.A.
- Directed by: Rift Fournier
- Narrated by: Greg Morris
- Country of origin: United States
- Original language: English

Original release
- Network: NBC
- Release: September 8, 1973 – September 4, 1976

Go is an American television series for children that aired late-mornings on Saturdays on NBC between September 1973 and September 1976.

The first two seasons of Go explored various action-oriented occupations, showing what it's like to be a race car driver, a symphony conductor, or a bronco buster. For the third season, the emphasis shifted to the United States Bicentennial observance of 1976, therefore Go became Go-U.S.A. from September 6, 1975 until the series ended the following year.
