= Cos (TV series) =

American television series

- Genre: Comedy
- Written by: China Clark
- Presented by: Bill Cosby
- Starring: Jeff Altman; Willie Bobo; Pat Delaney; Lola Falana; Mauricio Jarrin; Buzzy Linhart; Marion Ramsey
- Narrated by: John Wilson
- Country of origin: United States
- Original language: English
- No. of seasons: 1
- No. of episodes: 9

Production
- Running time: 60 minutes

Original release
- Network: ABC
- Release: September 19 – November 7, 1976

Cos is an American sketch comedy/variety television series that debuted on ABC in September 1976. It was hosted by comedian Bill Cosby and featured an ensemble cast who performed sketches each week. The show was unsuccessful in the Nielsen ratings and was cancelled by November 1976 and replaced with The Hardy Boys/Nancy Drew Mysteries.

Cosby appeared on this series concurrently with his starring role in Fat Albert and the Cosby Kids and the film Mother, Jugs & Speed.

== Episodes ==
No.	Title	Original air date
1	"Pilot"	September 19, 1976
2	"Bigfoot / Cookie Pilferage"	September 26, 1976
3	"Fred the Cockatoo / Tribute to Mothers"	October 3, 1976
4	"New Family / Traffic Rules"	October 10, 1976
5	"Night Club / Bay City Rollers"	October 17, 1976
6	"Episode 6"	October 23, 1976
7	"Episode 7"	October 30, 1976
8	"Episode 8"	November 1, 1976
9	"Episode 9"	November 7, 1976
