= List of film distributors by country =

This is a list of motion picture distributors, past and present, sorted alphabetically by country.

== Albania ==
- Constantin Film
- United International Pictures

== Argentina ==
- Star Distribution
- Warner Bros.
- Sony Pictures
- Fox Distribution Company
- United International Pictures
- Argentina Sono Film
- Artistas Unidos
- Cinema International Corporation
- Columbia Pictures of Argentina
- Lumiton
- Metro-Goldwyn-Mayer (MGM)
- Paramount Pictures
- RKO Radio Pictures de Argentina
- Universal Films Argentina
- Warner-Columbia Films

== Australia ==
- 20th Century Studios/Metro-Goldwyn-Mayer
- Antidote Films
- Film Australia
- Hoyts Distribution/Sony Pictures Releasing
- Leap Frog Films
- Lionsgate Australia
- Madman Entertainment
- Palace Films and Cinemas
- Paramount Pictures/Universal Pictures
- Titan View
- Transmission Films
- Roadshow Films
- Walt Disney Studios Motion Pictures

== Bangladesh ==
- Alpha-i
- Bongo BD
- Chorki
- Fatman Films
- Impress Telefilm
- Jaaz Multimedia
- Monsoon Films
- Tiger Media

== Brazil ==
- Star Distribution
- Warner Bros.
- Sony
- Fox Distribution Company
- Columbia Pictures
- United International Pictures

== Canada ==
- Alliance Films
- Astral Films
- Brightlight Pictures
- Cinexus/Famous Players (C/FP)
- Elevation Pictures
- Entertainment One
- Malofilm
- Mongrel Media
- Multiple Media Entertainment
- National Film Board of Canada
- Phase 4 Films (owned by Entertainment One)
- Les Films Séville (owned by Entertainment One)
- Teletoon
- Warner Bros.
- VVS Films

== China ==
- Alibaba Pictures
- August First Film Studio
- Beijing Enlight Pictures
- Bona Film Group
- China Film Co., Ltd.
- China Film Group
- DMG Entertainment
- Fantasy Pictures
- Huaxia Film Distribution
- Huayi Brothers
- Le Vision Pictures
- New Classics Pictures
- Tianjin Maoyan Weiying Culture Media
- Wanda Pictures

== Denmark ==
- Nordisk Film
- Buena Vista International Denmark

== Estonia ==
- Hea Film

== Finland ==
- Finnkino
- SF Film Finland

== France ==
- Ad Vitam
- BAC Films
- Les Films du Losange
- Gaumont
- Metropolitan Filmexport
- Le Pacte
- Pan-Européenne
- Paramount Pictures France
- Pathé
  - AMLF
- SND Films
- Sony Pictures Releasing France
- StudioCanal
  - Mars Distribution
- UGC Distribution
- UGC Fox Distribution (defunct)
- United International Pictures (until 2008)
- Universal Pictures International France
- Walt Disney Studios Motion Pictures France
- Warner Bros. Pictures France

== Germany and Austria ==
- 20th Century Studios
- Constantin Film
- Sony Pictures Releasing
- Filmverlag der Autoren
- Kinowelt
- Tobis
- Sascha-Film
- Senator Film
- Paramount Pictures Germany/Universal Pictures Germany
- Universum Film
- The Walt Disney Company Austria GmbH
- RKO Radio Pictures
- Warner Bros.
- Wild Bunch

== Hong Kong ==
- Cinema City International
- Golden Harvest
- JCE Movies Limited
- Media Asia
- Mei Ah Entertainment

== India ==
- AA Films
- AVM Productions
- Dharma Productions
- Eros International
- Excel Entertainment
- Grass Root Film Company
- Kalasangham Films
- Maxlab Cinemas and Entertainments
- PVR Pictures
- Rajshri Productions
- Red Chillies Entertainment
- Red Giant Movies
- Reliance Entertainment
- Sahara Movie Studios
- Shemaroo Entertainment
- Star Studio18
- Tips Music Films
- Ultra Media & Entertainment
- UTV Motion Pictures
- Yash Raj Films
- Zee Studios
- Red Giant Movies

== Italy ==
- Artex Film
- Cineriz
- De Laurentiis Entertainment Group
- Filmauro
- Lux Film
- Metacinema
- Sony Pictures
- Titanus
- Warner Bros.
- 01 Distribution
- Rai Cinema

== Japan ==
- Bandai Visual
- Toho
- Toei
- Shochiku
- Kadokawa Shoten

== Korea, South ==
- CJ Entertainment
- Lotte Entertainment
- Next Entertainment World
- Showbox

== Malaysia ==
- Golden Screen Cinemas
- Tanjong Golden Village
- MBO Cinemas

== Mexico ==
- Filmex
- Videocine

== Netherlands ==
- A-Film
- BBI Films
- Benelux Film Distributors
- Fortissimo Films
- In The Air
- Paramount Pictures
- Sony Pictures
- Universal Pictures International
- Warner Bros. (Holland)
- Walt Disney Studios Motion Pictures Netherlands
- WW Entertainment

== Nigeria ==
- Silverbird Film Distribution

== Pakistan ==
- A-Plus Films
- ARY Films
- Geo Films
- Summit Entertainment Pakistan
- Eveready Pictures
- Urdu 1 Pictures

== Philippines ==
- ABS-CBN Film Productions Inc. (Star Cinema)
- GMA Network Films Inc. (GMA Pictures)
- Lionsgate
- OctoArts Films/Axinite Digicinema
- Paramount Pictures/Sony Pictures Entertainment
- Regal Entertainment/Reality Entertainment
- Solar Pictures
- Universal Pictures
- Viva Films
- Walt Disney Studios Motion Pictures
- Warner Bros.

== Portugal ==
- Media Capital
- NOS Audiovisuais

== Russia ==
- Soyuzmultfilm
- Bazelevs Distribution
- Lenfilm
- Central Partnership
- Mosfilm

== Singapore ==
- Cathay Organisation
- Golden Village
- Shaw Organisation

== Sri Lanka ==
- Lyca Production

== Sweden ==
- Buena Vista International
- Lionsgate Sweden
- Metro-Goldwyn-Mayer
- Sandrew Metronome
- Sonet Film
- Sony Pictures
- Svensk Filmindustri
- Svenska Filminstitutet
- 20th Century Studios
- United International Pictures
- Warner Bros.

== Thailand ==
- GDH 559/GMM Tai Hub
- M Pictures
- Sahamongkol Film International
- United International Pictures
- Walt Disney Studios Motion Pictures/20th Century Studios/Sony Pictures Releasing
- Warner Bros.

== United Arab Emirates ==
- Spacetoon Pictures

== United Kingdom ==
- Anglo-Amalgamated
- Arrow Films
- Artificial Eye
- Axiom Films
- Ayngaran International (Tamil films only)
- Brent Walker Film Distributors
- Buena Vista International
- Cannon Distributors (UK)
- Cinema International Corporation (CIC)
- Columbia Pictures
- Columbia TriStar Film Distributors International
- Contender Entertainment Group
- Diffusion Pictures
- Dogwoof Pictures
- EMI Films (as a distributor, EMI operated under several names during its involvement in the film industry)
- Entertainment One
- Entertainment Film Distributors
- Eros International
- Film Four Distributors
- Film Producers Guild
- First Independent Films
- Fremantle
- General Film Distributors
- Guild Film Distribution
- Icon Film Distribution
- ITC Film Distributors
- Journeyman Pictures
- Lionsgate UK
- London Screen
- Metro-Goldwyn-Mayer
- Momentum Pictures
- New World Pictures
- Optimum Releasing
- Paramount Pictures UK
- Park Circus Ltd.
- Pathé
- PolyGram Filmed Entertainment
- Rank Film Distributors
- Redbus Film Distribution
- Revolver Entertainment
- RKO Radio Pictures
- Signature Entertainment
- Soda Pictures
- Summit Entertainment UK (from E1 Entertainment)
- Sony Pictures
- Tartan Films
- United Artists Corp.
- United International Pictures
- Universal Pictures UK
- The Walt Disney Company Ltd.
- Warner-Pathé Distributors Ltd.

== United States ==
- 1091 Pictures
- A24 Films
- American Film Institute (AFI)
- Allied Artists
- American Releasing Corp./American International Pictures
- Anchor Bay Entertainment
- Angel Studios
- Anywhere Road
- Associated Artists Productions
- Astor Pictures
- Avco Embassy Pictures
- Biograph Studios
- Brain Damage Films
- Buena Vista
- Cannon Releasing Corp.
- CBS Films
- Cinemation Industries
- Cinerama Releasing Corp.
- Cineville
- Columbia Pictures
- Commonwealth United Entertainment
- Continental Distributing (A Division Of Walter Reade-Sterling Inc.)
- Crown International Pictures
- Distributors Corporation of America (DCA)
- Dominant Pictures Corporation
- Eagle-Lion Films
- Embassy Pictures
- Eternal Pictures
- Fairway Film Alliance
- Famous Players Film Company
- Famous Players–Lasky Corporation
- FilmNation Entertainment
- Films Around The World
- First Run Features
- First Independent Pictures
- First National
- Fox Film Corporation
- Gaumont British Picture Corp. of America
- Genius Products
- Global Film Initiative
- Goldwyn Pictures
- Grand National Pictures
- Gravitas Ventures
- Hallmark Media
- Hal Roach Studios
- Hannover House
- Howco Productions Inc.
- IFC Films
- Janus Films
- KDK Factory
- Ketchup Entertainment
- Kinemacolor
- Koch-Lorber Films
- Liberty Films
- Lionsgate
- Lippert Pictures
- Lopert Films
- Magnolia Pictures
- Majestic Pictures
- Mascot Pictures
- Metro-Goldwyn-Mayer (MGM)
- Metro Pictures
- Metropolitan Pictures Corporation
- Milestone Films
- Millennium Films
- Monogram Pictures
- Mutual Film Corporation
- Myriad Pictures
- Music Box Films
- National General Pictures
- N. T. A. Pictures Inc./Republic Pictures (#2)
- Newmarket Films
- Norton, Frank
- Oscilloscope
- Overture Films
- Pacific International Enterprises
- Palm Pictures
- Paramount Pictures
- Pathe Exchanges Inc.
- Phaedra Cinema
- Phase 4 Films
- Picturehouse
- Prizma Color
- Producers Distributing Corporation (PDC)
- Producers Releasing Corporation (PRC)
- RKO Radio Pictures
- Rank Film Distributors of America Inc.
- Realart Pictures
- Republic Pictures (#1)
- Roadside Attractions
- Roc Nation
- Rogue Arts
- Rogue Pictures
- STX Entertainment
- The Samuel Goldwyn Company
- Screen Guild Productions Inc.
- Selznick International Pictures
- The Solax Company
- Sono Art-World Wide Pictures
- Sony Pictures
- Strand Releasing
- Striped Entertainment
- Technicolor
- Thanhouser Company
- The Weinstein Company
- THINKFilm
- Tiffany Studios
- Trans-Lux
- Transatlantic Pictures
- Triangle Film Corporation
- Troma
- 20th Century Studios
- Twentieth Century Pictures
- Ufa Film Co.
- United Artists
- Universal Pictures
- Vertical
- Victory Pictures Corporation
- Vitagraph Studios
- Vitaphone
- Walt Disney Studios Motion Pictures
- Warner Bros.
- Western Film Exchange
- Women Make Movies
- World Wide Motion Pictures Corp.
- World Wide Pictures Inc.
- Yari Film Group
- Zeitgeist Films

== Venezuela ==
- Cines Unidos

== Vietnam ==
- CJ CGV

== West Asia/North Africa ==
- General Organization for Cinema (Syria)
- Gulf Film
- Rotana
