= Fairway Film Alliance =

American distribution and production company

Fairway Film Alliance is a US distribution and production company. The company has produced eight films and distributed 60 titles.

Together with its sister company Rogue Arts, it has released titles such as She Loves Me Not (starring Cary Elwes, Joey Lauren Adams and Lisa Edelstein), Flickering Lights (original Danish title Blinkende Lygter, starring Mads Mikkelsen, Ulrich Thompsen and Ibene Hjele), Three Days of Rain (presented by Wim Wenders and starring Peter Falk, Blythe Danner and Lyle Lovett) and The Kid: Chamaco (starring Martin Sheen, Kirk Harris and Michael Madsen). Its 2011 film Army Dog stars Casper Van Dien, Grace Van Dien and Stelio Savante and was released in the US by Lionsgate.

== Distribution ==
- Angel Dog (2011) (worldwide - all media)
- Immortal Island (2011) (worldwide - all media)
- Roxy (2012) (worldwide - DVD)
- Art of Submission (2012) (non-USA - all media)
- The Sorrow (2013) (non-USA - all media)
- The Adventures of Paula Peril (USA - all media)
- Where The Road Runs Out (worldwide - all media)
- The Cigar Vixen (2016) (worldwide - all media)
- Leaves of the Tree (2016) (worldwide - all media)
- Army Dog (2016, originally Leap) (worldwide - all media)
- Saving Faith (2017) (worldwide - all media)
- Colors of Heaven (worldwide - all media)
- The Mystery of the Britannic (2017) (worldwide - all media)
- The 60 Yard Line (2017) (worldwide - all media)
- Bernie the Dolphin (2018) (produced)

Source: IMDb

== Production ==
- Army Dog (2016, originally Leap)
