= Campisi =

Campisi is an Italian surname. Notable people with the surname include:

- Gabriel Campisi (born 1968), American film producer, director and screenwriter
- Joseph Campisi, Dallas mobster
- Judith Campisi, American biogerontologist
- Luisito Campisi (born 1987), Italian footballer
- Sal Campisi (born 1942), American baseball player
