= San Diego International Film Festival =

Film festival

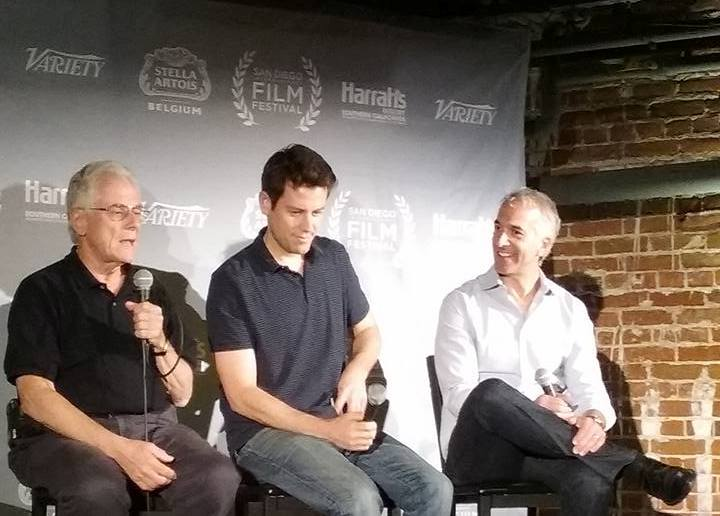
- Festival co-hosts Jeffrey Lyons, Ben Lyons and Scott Mantz at a Critics Panel in 2016.
- Location: San Diego and La Jolla
- Established: 2001
- Founded by: Karl Kozak, Robin Laatz
- Awards: Golden Eagle, Kumeyaay Eagle, Gregory Peck Award, Chris Brinker Award
- Artistic director: Tonya Mantooth
- Website: sdfilmfest.com

The San Diego International Film Festival is an independent film festival held in San Diego, California, produced by the nonprofit San Diego Film Foundation. The main event has traditionally been held annually in autumn at venues in the Gaslamp Quarter, La Jolla, and Balboa Park. In 2025, the festival re-centered in La Jolla.

The festival hosts celebrity awards banquets, panel discussions, retrospectives, parties, premieres, and contemporary independent narrative, documentary and short film screenings. Competitive juried categories vary year to year and have included foreign language, animated, Native American, military, social justice, equestrian, thrillers, and local films made in San Diego.

Special advanced screenings for VIP members and educational programs for San Diego area high schools are held year round in addition to an annual formal "Oscar watch party" in the winter.

== History ==
The San Diego International Film Festival (originally just "The San Diego Film Festival") and its non-profit foundation were founded in 2001 by event planner Robin Laatz and her filmmaker husband Karl Kozak.

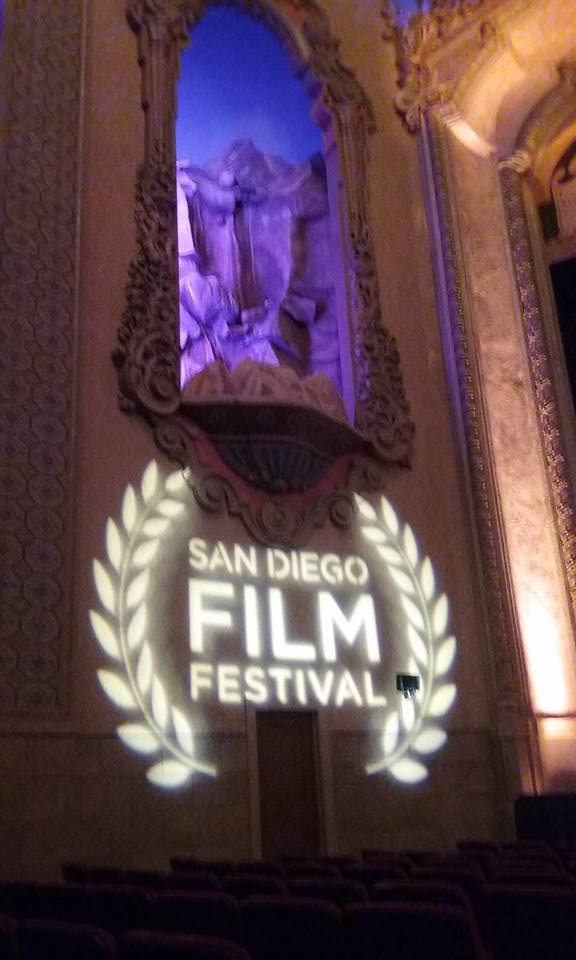
Opening night films have screened at the historic Balboa Theatre.

In its first decade, films premiering at the festival included Roger Dodger, The Blair Witch Project, Fahrenheit 9/11, An Inconvenient Truth, Waiting for Superman, Napoleon Dynamite, Primer, The Machinist, and Born Into Brothels.

The festival has been designated "Best Party Fest" and "Best Beach Fest" by the "Ultimate Film Festival Survival Guide". It has also been criticized along the same lines for being "more intent on throwing parties than putting quality films on the screen."

=== New Leadership/Native Direction ===
In 2012, leadership passed to husband and wife producers Dale Strack and Tonya Mantooth. According to Strack, they were modeling it after Napa Valley Film Festival, with a "longer term goal" of rivaling Sundance or TriBeCa.

The festival expanded to a second location in La Jolla the same year.

Another new change was the establishment of a "Native American Advisory Board", whose name was changed in 2017 to "American Indian Advisory Board". Tribes represented on the AIA board include Sac and Fox, Luiseño, Kumeyaay, Seminole, Lipan/Mescalero Apache, and the Barona Band of Mission Indians. Notable members of the board include character actor Saginaw Grant (The Lone Ranger, Breaking Bad), Randolph Mantooth (Emergency!, Sons of Anarchy, brother of Tonya Mantooth) and Erica Pinto, the Chairwoman of Jamul Indian Village.

=== 2012-2019 ===
Notable films premiering at the festival during this time include Silver Linings Playbook, 12 Years a Slave, He Named Me Malala, Goosebumps, The Imitation Game, Wild, Lion, Tiger, Three Billboards Outside Ebbing, Missouri, Call Me By Your Name, Marshall, The Favourite, Widows, Boy Erased, Jojo Rabbit, Portrait of a Lady on Fire, Marriage Story, The Irishman, and Parasite.

In 2013, New York area film critic Jeffrey Lyons was added as festival host and made honorary jury chairman. He acted as host or as co-host along with his with son Ben Lyons or with Access Hollywood film critic Scott Mantz, up until 2018, when Mantz hosted solo.

The festival added "International" to its name in 2016, having previously been known only as the San Diego Film Festival.

In 2016, the festival established a Film Insider Series for VIP members to watch featured official selections and festival winners, premieres and special advanced screenings throughout the year.

In September 2019, the festival began hosting free screenings of popular movies on Mission Beach.

In 2019, the festival expanded to six days and hosted a second opening night film (The Irishman) at the La Jolla Village.

=== 2020-present ===
Notable films premiering at the festival during this time include Nomadland, The French Dispatch, Spencer, The Power of the Dog, The Lost Daughter, The Banshees of Inisherin, and The Inspection.

In 2020, due to the COVID-19 pandemic, the festival was reduced to four days and presented 114 films both virtually and on drive-thru screens.

In 2021, limited in-person screenings resumed at new venues including the Museum of Photographic Arts and The San Diego Museum of Art in Balboa Park, as well as the Catamaran Resort in Mission Bay. A special screening was held on the deck on a historic aircraft carrier at the USS Midway Museum.

In 2022, after organizers at the Women's Museum of California's had ended their Women's Film Festival due to the COVID-19 pandemic, they joined forces with the San Diego Festival to present a women's series of films.

In 2023, the film festival's opening night was held at Westfield UTC AMC on October 8. For the festival's 22nd year, they will have a showing of the Oscar winning film, The Holdovers. The festival was on October 18–22, at Balboa Park's Museum of Photographic Arts. During those 5 days there were showings of 91 films of the 3,200 films that were submitted. The theme of the festival was "Celebrating the power of film", meaning films will be outlining the importance of film and its impact on our society and community.

In 2025, due to the closure of theaters downtown and other factors, all festival events re-centered in La Jolla.

As of 2026, the San Diego International Film Festival is a qualifying festival for the Canadian Screen Awards.

In 2026, the grand jury prize for Best Feature Film was awarded to The Leader, written and directed by Michael Gallagher, about the true story of the Heaven's gate cult starring Academy Award Nominee Vera Farmiga, Tim Blake Nelson, Golden Globes Winner Jim Parsons, Grace Caroline Currey, and Simon Rex.

== Awards ==
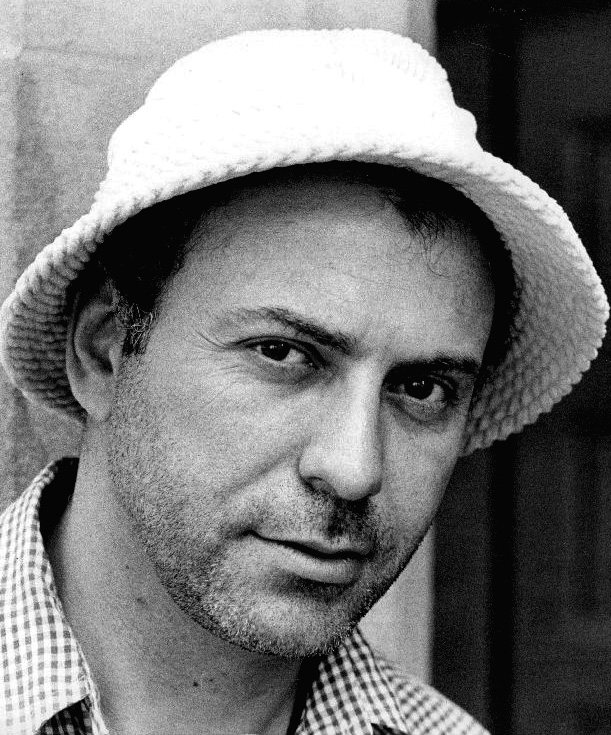
Alan Arkin was the first recipient of the Gregory Peck Award at the San Diego Film Festival in 2014

=== Gregory Peck Award ===
The Gregory Peck Award for Cinematic Excellence has been presented by the family of San Diego native Gregory Peck at the festival since 2014. Recipients at the San Diego festival include Viola Davis, Mark Hamill, Penelope Ann Miller, Andy Garcia, Laurence Fishburne, Keith Carradine, Patrick Stewart, Annette Bening, and Alan Arkin. The family originally presented the award at the Dingle International Film Festival in Ireland. Previous recipients include Gabriel Byrne, Jim Sheridan, Jean-Jacques Beineix, and Laura Dern.

=== Chris Brinker Award ===
The Chris Brinker Award was created by the family of Chris Brinker, a San Diego area producer best known for The Boondock Saints movies, who died of an aortic aneurysm at the age of 42. The award is given every year to the best first time director in competition at the festival.

=== Golden Eagle ===
Since 2014, honored celebrities and winning filmmakers have been presented with a "Golden Eagle" themed statuette, sculpted by Apache artist Ruben Chato.

=== Kumeyaay Eagle Award ===
An annual award presented to the best film competing in the American Indian track.

=== Night of the Stars Awards ===
The festival offers other awards - Auteur, Vanguard, Humanitarian, Rising Star, etc. - that vary year to year. Honorees include:

- 2026 - Mira Sorvino, Iliza Shlesinger
- 2025: Marlee Matlin, Joe Manganiello, John Magaro
- 2024: Alessandro Nivola, Marianne Jean-Baptiste, Lhakpa Sherpa, Amanda Righetti
- 2022: Regina Hall, Tony Hale, Lisa Ann Walker, Colson Baker.
- 2019: Lindsay Wagner, Jared Harris, Pitbull, Jillian Bell, Camilla Morrone.
- 2018: Kenny Loggins, Kathryn Hahn, John Cho, Topher Grace, Zachary Levi, Alex Wolff, Christian Navarro.
- 2017: Kumail Nanjiani, Heather Graham, Taran Killam, and Blake Jenner.
- 2017: Kate Beckinsale, Simon Helberg, and Jason Mitchell
- 2016: Adrien Brody, Geena Davis, Brit Marling, and John Boyega
- 2015: Beau Bridges, Michelle Monaghan, Eli Roth, Allison Pill, Tom Berenger
- 2014: Judd Apatow, Michael B. Jordan, and Mariel Hemingway
- 2013: Gus Van Sant, Diane Ladd, Anne Heche, Penny Lane, Stephen Gyllenhaal, and Martin McDonagh.

== Gala Event Films ==
Year	Opening Night	Other Galas	Closing Night	Ref
2022	Armageddon Time (dir. James Gray)	The Banshees of Inisherin (dir. Martin McDonagh) The Lost King (dir. Stephen Frears) Taurus (dir. Tim Sutton)	Empire of Light (dir. Sam Mendes)	
2021	C'mon, C'mon - (dir. Mike Mills)	The French Dispatch (dir. Wes Anderson) Spencer (dir. Pablo Larrain) Belfast (dir. Kenneth Branagh) The Power of the Dog (dir. Jane Campion) The Worst Person in the World (dir. Joachim Trier)	The Lost Daughter (dir. Maggie Gyllenhaal)	
2020	Nomadland - (dir. Chloé Zhao) - drive-in Drunk Bus - virtual village	Stardust (dir. Gabriel Range) - World Premiere Blithe Spirit (dir. Edward Hall)	MLK/FBI - virtual village	
2019	Jojo Rabbit (dir. Taika Waititi) - Gaslamp The Irishman (dir. Martin Scorsese) - La Jolla	The Kill Team (dir. Dan Knauss) Motherless Brooklyn (dir. Edward Norton) Clemency (dir. Chinonye Chuckwu, US) Parasite (dir. Bong Joon Ho) The Truth (dir. Hirokazu Kore-eda)	Marriage Story (dir. Noah Baumbach) - Gaslamp A Hidden Life (dir. Terrence Malick) - La Jolla	
2018	Can You Ever Forgive Me? (dir. Marielle Heller, US)	Everybody Knows (dir. Asghar Farhadi) Widows (dir. Steve McQueen) The Favourite (dir. Yorgos Lanthimos) Wildlife (dir. Paul Dano)	Boy Erased (dir. Joel Edgerton)	
2017	Marshall (dir. Reginald Hudlin, US)	Three Billboards Outside Ebbing, Missouri Call Me By Your Name (dir. Luca Guadagnino) Thelma (dir. Joachim Trier, Norway) Killing Gunther (dir. Taren Killam) - World Premiere The Last Movie Star as Dog Years (dir. Adam Rifkin)	Dismissed (dir. Benjamin Arfman, US) World Premiere	
2016	Other People (dir. Chris Kelly, US)	Lion (dir. Garth Davis, Australia) Denial (dir. Mick Jackson, UK/USA) Julieta (dir. Pedro Almodovar, Spain)	The Eagle Huntress (UK/Mongolia)	
2015	Septembers of Shiraz (dir. Wayne Blair)	Blackway as Go With Me Diablo (dir. Lawrence Roeck) Youth (dir. Paolo Sorrentino, Italy) He Named Me Malala		
2014	Wild (dir. Jean-Marc Vallée, US)	The Imitation Game (UK/US) The Equalizer (dir. Antoine Fuqua)	You're Not You (US)	
2013	12 Years a Slave (dir. Steve McQueen, UK/US)	The German Doctor (dir. Lucía Puenzo)	August: Osage County (US)	
2012		Silver Linings Playbook (dir. David O. Russell) Seven Psychopaths (dir. Martin McDonagh) Quartet (dir. Dustin Hoffman, UK) The Sapphires (dir. Wayne Blair, Aus)		
2011	50/50 (dir. Jonathan Levine, US)	Like Crazy (dir. Drake Doremus)	The Bully Project (dir. Lee Hirsch)	
2010		Waiting For "Superman"		
2008	The Lucky Ones (dir. Neil Burger)		Morning Light (dir. Mark Monroe)	
2004		The Machinist (dir. Brad Anderson) Primer (dir. Shane Carruth) Dear Frankie (dir. Shona Auerbach) Born Into Brothels (dir. Zana Briski)		
2003		Broadway: The Golden Age (dir. Rick McKay) Mothers & Daughters		
2002	Rodger Dodger (dir. Dylan Kidd, US)	Now You Know (dir. Jeff Anderson, US)	Anything But Love as Standard Time (US)	

== Partnerships ==
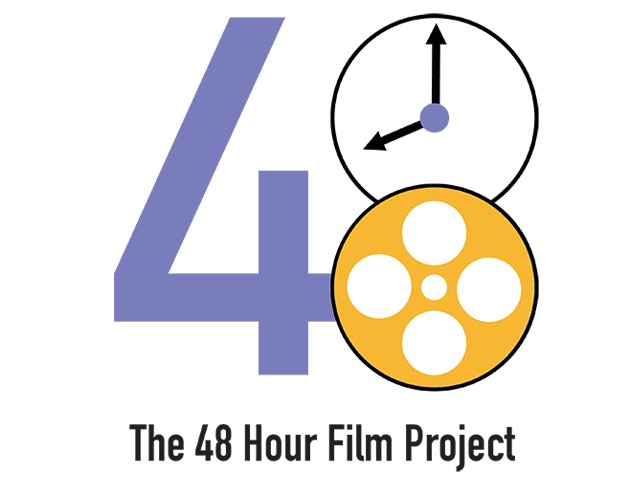

Films from San Diego that win or are nominated in the 48 Hour Film Project are screened during the festival every year.

The San Diego International Film Festival has partnered with the San Diego County Office of Education and San Diego Unified School District to bring films about social issues like homelessness, water pollution and refugees to area high schools.

The festival - along with the GI Film Festival, FilmOut San Diego, San Diego Asian Film Festival, San Diego Latino Film Festival, Horrible Imaginings Film Festival - submits films to San Diego Film Week, a city-wide spring showcase produced by Film Consortium San Diego. Submitted films are eligible to win San Diego Film Awards.

== See also ==
- San Diego Asian Film Festival
- San Diego Jewish Film Festival
- San Diego Black Film Festival
- GI Film Festival
- Oceanside International Film Festival
- San Diego Film Critics Society
- San Diego Comic-Con
