= Gabriel Campisi =

American film director

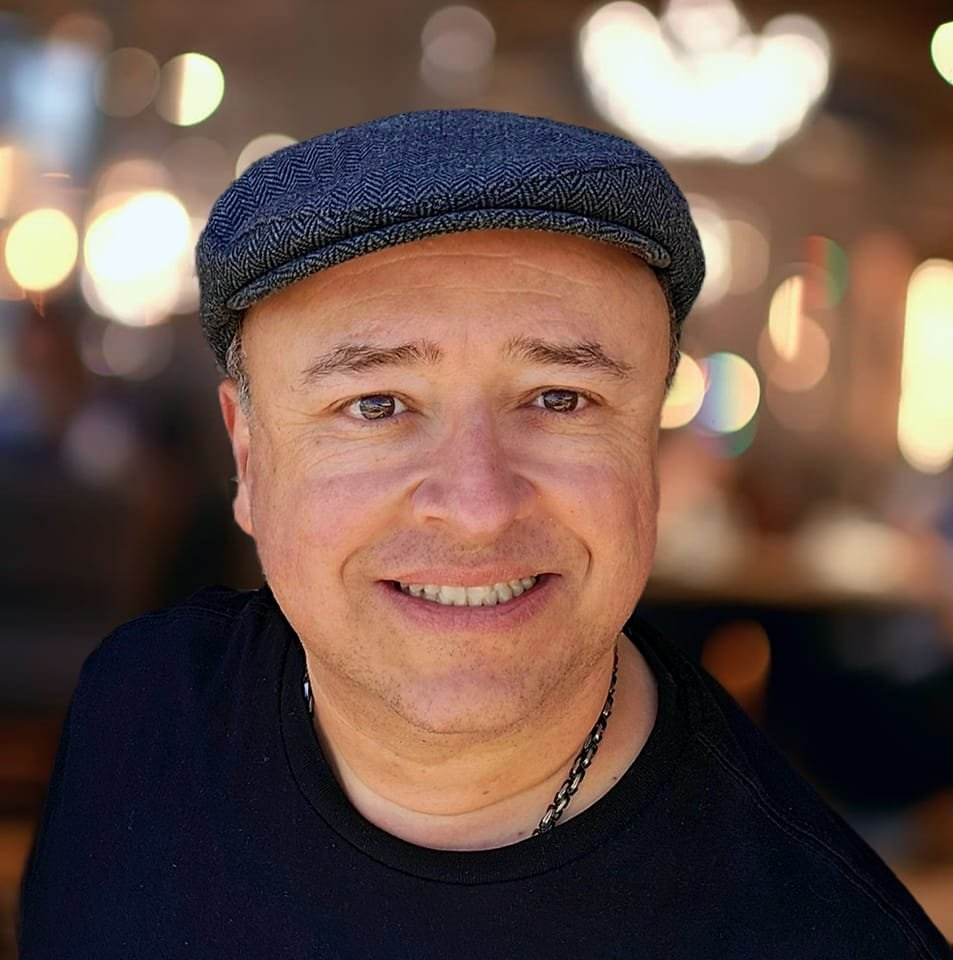
- Born: Los Angeles, California
- Occupations: Author, Producer, Screenwriter, Director
- Website: www.gabrielcampisi.com

Gabriel Campisi is an American producer, screenwriter, director and author.

Campisi began making Super 8mm movies at the age of 8, and received his first recognition from Chicago's Photographic Society of America Teenage Film Festival at the age of 16 for his short film The Lost Creature, a project that successfully mixed live action with stop-motion animation. He got his professional start in Hollywood as a production assistant after graduating high school, and quickly worked his way up the ladder to writing and directing national commercials and pop-star music videos for MTV. He continued to shoot short films that received international attention and awards for his use of elaborate special effects, including The Law, the story of a man on the run from the notorious Men in Black of UFO folklore.

Campisi is the screenwriter of the motion picture Little Dead Rotting Hood (starring Eric Balfour, Bianca A. Santos, Romeo Miller, Patrick Muldoon, Heather Tom and Marina Sirtis), the author of the first and second editions of the book The Independent Filmmaker's Guide to Writing a Business Plan for Investors, published by McFarland & Company, and the editor-in-chief of the comic book 17 & Life: Jailbait, which was turned into a feature motion picture in 2014 by Los Angeles-based studios Cinedigm and The Asylum.

His latest book, The Independent Filmmaker's Guide to the New Hollywood - Success in the Era of Netflix and Streaming Video, also by McFarland & Company, features exclusive interviews with over a dozen prominent filmmakers and executive producers, including Val Hill (Blade Runner 2049, 12 Strong), Pen Densham (Harriet, The Last Full Measure), Patrick Lussier (Trick, Terminator Genisys, My Bloody Valentine), Joel Soisson (The Prophecy series, Children of the Corn series, Hellraiser series, Bill & Ted's Excellent Adventure), Larry Kasanoff (True Lies, Mortal Kombat series, Terminator 2), and David Rimawi (Black Summer, Z Nation, Sharknado series).

Other films Campisi has produced include The Horde (featuring Bill Moseley, Costas Mandylor, Nestor Serrano, Vernon Wells and Matt Willig), Arlo the Burping Pig (featuring Drake Bell and Joey Lawrence), Buddy Hutchins (starring Jamie Kennedy and Sally Kirkland), Wishing For A Dream (starring Sara Malakul Lane), School's Out (featuring Jason London, Eric Roberts, David Chokachi and Nick Swardson), Blue Line (starring Tom Sizemore and Jordan Ladd), and Pinwheel (featuring the last performance by Ox Baker). He also appears as himself in the feature documentary, More Than Miyagi: The Pat Morita Story.

He is a member of the Producers Guild of America.

== Filmography ==
FILMS
Year	Title	Role
1992	The Law	Writer-Director-Producer
1998	Alien Agenda: Endangered Species	Writer-Director-Producer
2015	Buddy Hutchins	Executive Producer/Producer
2016	Wishing for a Dream	Executive Producer/Producer
2016	The Horde	Producer
2016	Arlo: The Burping Pig	Co-Producer
2016	Little Dead Rotting Hood	Writer
2017	Pinwheel	Producer
2017	Death Pool	Executive Producer/Producer
2017	After School Special	Executive Producer
2017	The Assault	Associate Producer
2017	The Domicile	Executive Producer/Producer
2019	Is My Daughter Really Dead?	Executive Producer
2020	Attack of the Unknown	Executive Producer
2021	The Chain	Producer
2021	More Than Miyagi: The Pat Morita Story (Documentary)	Self - Producer
2022	Bridge of the Doomed	Executive Producer
2023	Bermuda Island	Executive Producer
2025	Alien Horde	Executive Producer
2025	Pay Homage	Executive Producer
2025	Year of the Rooster	Executive Producer

TELEVISION
Year	Title	Role
2018	A Dangerous Date	Executive Producer
2018	A Mother's Greatest Fear	Executive Producer
2019	In Bed with a Killer	Executive Producer
2019	Love on Repeat	Executive Producer

STREAMING
Year	Title	Role	Distribution
2020-2021	The Production Meeting	Executive Producer	Spotify, Pandora, iHeart Radio, Apple Podcasts, Google Podcasts, Podbean
2025	Helios	Consulting Producer	Audible, Spotify, Pandora, Apple Podcasts, iHeart Radio, Libro.fm, Google Podcasts

== Books ==
SCHOLARLY
Year	Title	Foreword by	Publisher
2004	The Independent Filmmaker's Guide to Writing a Business Plan for Investors (1st ed.)	Fred Olen Ray	McFarland
2012	The Independent Filmmaker's Guide to Writing a Business Plan for Investors (2nd ed.)	Morris Ruskin	McFarland
2020	The Independent Filmmaker's Guide to the New Hollywood - Success in the Era of Netflix and Streaming Video	Morris Ruskin	McFarland

COMIC BOOKS & GRAPHIC NOVELS
Year	Title	Role
2014	17 & Life: Jailbait	Writer - Editor-in-Chief
2016	Little Dead Rotting Hood	Writer - Creator - Editor
2021	The Living Corpse: Relics	Editor
