= Loser (1996 film) =

- Directed by: Kirk Harris
- Written by: Kirk Harris
- Starring: Kirk Harris; Peta Wilson; Jack Rubio; Norman Saleet; Jonathan Chaus
- Production company: Rogue Arts
- Release date: 1996
- Running time: 85 minutes
- Country: United States
- Language: English
- Budget: $38,000

Loser is a 1996 dramatic film starring Kirk Harris and Peta Wilson. Loser was written and directed by Harris and was his directorial debut.

Loser screened at the 1995 Slamdance Film Festival.

The film was shot for just $38,000 on a shooting schedule of only 12 days and was praised by film critics at the San Jose Mercury News and Los Angeles Times.

== Plot ==
Young Jimmy "James Dean" Ray is suburban drug dealer whose life one day finally spirals violently out of control.

== Critical reception ==
Los Angeles Times, "An impressive no budget Rebel Without a Cause."

San Jose Mercury News, "Writer, director, star emerges a winner in `Loser.‘"

Film Threat, "This is film is a solid reminder of what true independent filmmaking is all about. “Loser” is anything but."
