= Dakota (2022 film) =

- Poster
- Directed by: Kirk Harris
- Written by: Johnny Harrington
- Starring: Abbie Cornish; Lola Sultan; Patrick Muldoon; Tim Rozon; William Baldwin
- Distributed by: Samuel Goldwyn Films
- Release date: April 1, 2022 (limited)
- Running time: 96 minutes
- Countries: United States; Italy
- Language: English

Dakota is a 2022 Italian American family film written by Johnny Harrington, directed by Kirk Harris and starring Abbie Cornish, Lola Sultan, Patrick Muldoon, Tim Rozon and William Baldwin.

== Plot ==
Recently-widowed Kate Sanders (Abbie Cornish) lives on her family's farm in Georgia with her daughter Alex (Lola Sultan). Life on the farm is a challenge and things only get more complicated when combat dog Dakota arrives on their doorstep delivered by Sergeant CJ Malcolm (Tim Rozon), fulfilling a promise he made to his friend and fellow Afghanistan veteran Marine Clay Sanders (Kate's late husband and Alex's father) to bring Dakota home to them if he died. Kate divides her time between the farm and running the volunteer fire department. Dakota watches over the family and becomes a local hero by helping out around town. Meanwhile, the local Sheriff (Patrick Muldoon) knows an old long-buried secret: that the Sanders' farm is valuable; he has been leaning on Kate to sell and will stop at nothing to get his hands on their land. With help from Alex and Dakota, Kate realizes the true value of the farm; meanwhile, Dakota teaches Alex that nothing's better than having a dog as a best friend.

== Cast ==
- Lola Sultan as Alex Sanders
- Abbie Cornish as Kate Sanders
- Patrick Muldoon as Sheriff Danforth
- Tim Rozon as CJ Malcolm
- William Baldwin as Monty Sanders

== Production ==
In March 2021, it was announced that Sultan and Cornish were cast in the film. That same month, it was announced that Baldwin and Muldoon were also cast in the film.

== Release ==
In February 2022, it was announced that the American distribution rights to the film were acquired by Samuel Goldwyn Films. The film was released in limited theaters on April 1, 2022. Then it was released on VOD on May 20, 2022.

== Reception ==
The film has a 22% rating on Rotten Tomatoes based on nine reviews. Bradley Gibson of Film Threat rated the film a 7 out of 10. Tara McNamara of Common Sense Media awarded the film two stars out of five.
