= Tonya Mantooth =

American film producer and arts administrator

- Education: San Diego State University
- Occupations: Film producer, arts administrator
- Years active: 1990s–present
- Known for: San Diego International Film Festival
- Notable work: Army Dog
- Relatives: Randolph Mantooth (brother)

Tonya Mantooth is an American film producer, arts administrator, and artistic director of the San Diego International Film Festival.

== Early life and education ==
Mantooth was born in El Campo, Texas and grew up in Santa Barbara, California. She was involved in theater and music at a young age. Mantooth graduated from San Diego State University in 1981 with a bachelor's degree in business administration and music. Actor Randolph Mantooth, known for his role as firefighter-paramedic Johnny Gage on the television series Emergency!, was her older brother.

== Production career ==
Mantooth performed as a singer and pianist while working as marketing manager for Learning Forum before joining CRM Films. She later worked as a producer at 4Square Productions and co-founded The Dakota Group, a Southern California film and post-production company. She then went on to work for Aviatech, an internet advertising agency. By 2018, she had produced four feature films through Mantooth Films.

== San Diego International Film Festival ==
Mantooth, along with Patti Judd, Kevin Leap and Dale Strack, undertook leadership of the San Diego International Film Festival in 2012. She helped rebrand the festival in 2016, establishing partnerships the San Diego Jewish Film Festival and FilmOut San Diego. By 2018, Mantooth assisted the festival's programming of films focused on environmental issues and social impacts, to let audiences know about social issues and provide them with international perspectives.

After the COVID-19 pandemic, in which the festival was mostly virtual, it returned to in-person screenings in 2022. It had almost 3,100 submissions from 85 countries, much higher than the approximately 300 to 400 submissions it received when Mantooth joined. She also developed a Women's Film Series for the festival with Women's Museum of California executive director Felicia Shaw.

== Accolades ==
Mantooth received regional Emmy Awards for work that included a documentary about the San Diego Bay. By 2018, it was reported that she had received nine regional Emmys as well as more than 60 Telly and ADDY awards.

== Filmography ==
Year	Title	Role
2012	Deadtime Stories	Executive producer
2013	Grave Secrets	Executive producer
2013	Killer Holiday	Executive producer
2014	Inventing to Nowhere	Co-producer
2015	Operation: Neighborhood Watch!	Executive producer
2016	Army Dog	Producer
2024	Into the Unknown	Producer
