= Bernie the Dolphin 2 =

- Directed by: Kirk Harris
- Written by: Marty Poole; Terri Emerson
- Produced by: Marty Poole; Tony Armer; Terri Emerson; Andrea Iervolino; Monika Bacardi
- Starring: Lola Sultan; Patrick Muldoon; Logan Allen; Kevin Sorbo
- Cinematography: Brandon D. Hyde
- Edited by: Kurt Nishimura
- Music by: Joshua Mosley
- Release date: December 17, 2019
- Running time: 99 minutes
- Countries: Canada; United States
- Language: English
- Box office: $24,742

Bernie the Dolphin 2 is a 2019 Canadian-American action comedy film directed by Kirk Harris and starring Lola Sultan, Patrick Muldoon, Logan Allen and Kevin Sorbo. It is a sequel to the 2018 film Bernie the Dolphin.

== Plot ==
One year after meeting Bernie the Dolphin, Kevin and Holly Ryan, and their dad Bob, join the team at Marineland, the local aquarium, and they discover that Bernie has returned. But Bob's old boss and former enemy Winston Mills has been paroled from prison and is ordered by the court to work at the aquarium and live in an apartment under house arrest upon being moved into it by Detective Wyatt.

Winston's parole officer Mason Jacks brings Winston to work at Marineland the next day which Bob and the kids object to, but Winston claims he's a changed man and wants a second chance. Kevin and Holly's mother Abby wants the kids to forgive him....to which they reluctantly agree. Kevin also expresses interest in playing football to impress a cheerleader named Ellie that he has a crush on.

Winston then starts work at Marineland with Bob and the kids in charge of him, which Holly takes advantage of by having the dolphins mess around with him. He's later approached by Devin Cruz, a former businessman who was the mastermind of the chemical plant plan from the previous year who arranged to have Winston paroled from prison. Cruz wants Winston's help to steal Bernie and offers him money, which Kevin and Holly plan to investigate.

Meanwhile, Ellie and her friend Harper went on a boat and wound up lost at sea,. Bernie and his pod find them stranded on an island, and gets Bob and the kids to rescue them on their boat and get interviewed by local reporter Summer Sands and Ellie kisses Kevin on the cheek....which Holly teases him about and he later starts practicing football with his dad.

Winston finds out his apartment is being fumigated. Cruz approaches him and tells him to steal Kevin's GPS device and gets Mason to arrange Winston to temporarily live at Marineland. Bob reluctantly agrees to that.

One of Cruz's accomplices named Frankie Franklin rents a boat with a tank from Abby, which they plan to use to steal Bernie. Meanwhile, Winston starts to warm up to the sea mammals by learning to feed the dolphin Rascal and meets the sea turtles Rocky and Pokey. Bob says he's starting to do a good job.

The next day, Cruz arranges for someone to go to Marineland to meet Winston and get the GPS code, so he takes Kevin's phone. Marineland's parrot Mango tells Kevin and Holly about Winston meeting Frankie at the marina to kidnap Bernie.

Winston meets Cruz at Marineland and gives him Kevin's phone, but refuses to accept his money and tells him to stay away from the dolphins. Kevin and Holly then run off to the hotel where Cruz is staying at and they sneak into his room and hack into his computer and discover that he and Frankie want to sell Bernie to a Marine Park in South America.

Meanwhile, Frankie siphons gas from Bob and Abby's boat before they go out to sea and they run out of gas, leaving them stranded. Kevin and Holly sneak onto Frankie's boat where Abby calls Kevin's phone. Frankie answers it and then she calls Winston to go look for the kids with encouragement with Rascal, and Bernie finds Bob and Abby and Bob tells him to go find the kids.

Mason finds out that Winston left Marineland and Kevin and Holly are captured by Cruz. Winston tells Mason that the kids are in trouble and they find them. Kevin uses a football tackle on Cruz and Mason cuffs him. Winston allows Mason to cuff him too for violating his parole. The Coast Guard rescues the parents with help from Bernie and his pod.

Cruz is arrested by the Coast Guard, but the kids tell Mason to release Winston for rescuing them. They finally accept him as a friend and they all wave goodbye to Bernie and his pod.

== Cast ==
- Lola Sultan as Holly Ryan
- Patrick Muldoon as Bob Ryan
- Logan Allen as Kevin Ryan
- Kevin Sorbo as Winston Mills
- Lily Cardone as Sidney Simms
- Vincent De Paul as Detective Wyatt
- Josué Gutierrez as Devon Cruz
- Dahlia Legault as Abby Ryan
- Wendell Kinney as Mason Jacks
- Tommi Rose as Ellie
- Nicole Michelle as Harper
- Ricky Wayne as Frankie Franklin
- Brittany Hoppe as Housekeeper

== Release ==
The film was released on DVD, On Demand and digital platforms on December 17, 2019.

== Reception ==
Renee Schonfeld of Common Sense Media awarded the film two stars out of five.
