= Sweet Magnolias =

2020 American romance drama television series

- Genre: Romantic drama
- Based on: Sweet Magnolias series by Sherryl Woods
- Developed by: Sheryl J. Anderson
- Starring: JoAnna Garcia Swisher; Brooke Elliott; Heather Headley; Logan Allen; Anneliese Judge; Carson Rowland; Justin Bruening; Chris Klein; Jamie Lynn Spears; Dion Johnstone; Brandon Quinn; Chris Medlin
- Music by: James Jandrisch
- Opening theme: "Destination" by Nickel Creek
- Country of origin: United States
- Original language: English
- No. of seasons: 5
- No. of episodes: 50

Production
- Executive producers: Sherryl Woods; Sheryl J. Anderson; Dan Paulson
- Producers: Matt Drake; Albert T. Dickerson III; Cameron Boling
- Cinematography: Brian Johnson; Glenn Brown
- Editors: Daria Ellerman; Jason Pielak; Alison Grace; Mark Shearer; Lara Mazur; Sam Dewar; Troy Weinreich
- Running time: 43–54 minutes
- Production company: Daniel L. Paulson Productions

Original release
- Network: Netflix
- Release: May 19, 2020 – June 11, 2026

Sweet Magnolias is an American romantic drama television series, developed by Sheryl J. Anderson and based on the Sweet Magnolias novels by Sherryl Woods, starring JoAnna Garcia Swisher, Brooke Elliott and Heather Headley in the lead roles.

The series premiered on Netflix on May 19, 2020 and was canceled after five seasons in September 2026, with its fifth and final season being released on June 11, 2026.

== Premise ==
Sweet Magnolias follows "three South Carolina women, best friends since childhood, as they shepherd each other through the complexities of romance, career, and family."

== Cast and characters ==
=== Main ===
- JoAnna Garcia Swisher as Maddie Townsend, a recently separated woman with three children in Serenity, South Carolina who is trying to get back in the workforce while going through a divorce from her husband, Bill. She's a part of a friend group that calls themselves Sweet Magnolias.
- Brooke Elliott as Dana Sue Sullivan, a chef, and owner of a restaurant called Sullivan's. She is Helen's and Maddie's best friend and part of the Sweet Magnolias.
- Heather Headley as Helen Decatur, an accomplished attorney. She is Dana Sue's and Maddie's best friend, and one of the Sweet Magnolias. She bought a mansion which she converted into The Corner Spa with Maddie and Dana Sue.
- Logan Allen as Kyle Townsend, Maddie and Bill's younger son who is a freshman at Serenity High School with a talent for acting. He had a crush on Annie but later shows interest in Nellie Lewis.
- Anneliese Judge as Annie Sullivan, Dana Sue's daughter. She is friends with the Townsend brothers and an avid photographer. She and Tyler are childhood best friends and whom she kissed after having too much to drink at a party while being oblivious to Kyle's feelings. Annie is pursued by Jackson, whom she later ends up dating. The two break up later on in the series.
- Carson Rowland as Tyler "Ty" Townsend (seasons 1–4), Maddie and Bill's eldest son who is a junior at Serenity High School and a star pitcher on his high school baseball team
- Justin Bruening as Cal Maddox, Ty's baseball coach and Maddie's new love interest. He is a former professional baseball player.
- Chris Klein as Bill Townsend (seasons 1–3), Maddie's ex-husband and a family doctor at Serenity Family Physicians
- Jamie Lynn Spears as Noreen Fitzgibbons, Bill's pregnant fiancée, a nurse in his office who became his mistress (Note: Jamie Lynn Spears is credited as "Special Guest Star" in season 1, but is a Series Regular.)
- Dion Johnstone as Erik Whitley (seasons 2–5; recurring season 1), the sous chef at Sullivan's and a mentor to Isaac
- Brandon Quinn as Ronnie Sullivan (seasons 2–5; guest season 1), Dana Sue's estranged husband and Annie's father
- Chris Medlin as Isaac Downey (seasons 3–5; recurring seasons 1–2), a member of the kitchen staff at Sullivan's. He recently moved to Serenity to find his birth father and mother. It was later revealed that his biological parents are Peggy and Bill.

=== Recurring ===
- Bianca Berry Tarantino (seasons 1–2) and Ella Grace Helton (seasons 3–5) as Katie Townsend, Maddie and Bill's only daughter and youngest child
- Frank Oakley III as Harlan Bixby, the assistant coach of Serenity High School baseball team
- Allison Gabriel as Mary Vaughn Lewis (seasons 1–3), the wife of Trent Lewis, Mayor of Serenity and main adversary of the Sweet Magnolias
- Simone Lockhart as Nellie Lewis (seasons 1–3), Mary Vaughn's daughter. She has a crush on Kyle.
- Brittany L. Smith as Peggy Martin, the owner of the newspaper The Centinel of Serenity and later mayor of Serenity
- Tracey Bonner as Pastor June Wilkes, pastor of the church of Serenity
- Charles Lawlor as Collins Littlefield (seasons 1–4)
- Harlan Drum as CeCe Matney, Ty's love interest
- Sam Ashby as Jackson Butler Lewis (seasons 1–3), Ty's baseball rival teammate and Mary Vaughn's son. He previously dated Annie.
- Hunter Burke as Trotter Vidhyarkorn (seasons 1–3), Cal's best friend who works at The Corner Spa as a yoga instructor
- Al-Jaleel Knox as Gabe Weatherspoon, Ty's best friend and baseball teammate
- Michael Shenefelt as Ryan Wingate (seasons 1–3), Helen's on-and-off boyfriend
- Michael May as Simon Spry (seasons 1–2), Annie's friend
- Caroline Lagerfelt as Paula Vreeland, Maddie's mom
- Chase Anderson as Jeremy Reynolds, produce supplier for Sullivan's restaurant
- Paul Rolfes as Trent Lewis (seasons 1–3), former mayor of Serenity
- Artemis as Lily Song (seasons 2–5), Annie's friend and Kyle's girlfriend
- Wynn Everett as Kathy Sullivan (seasons 2–5), Ronnie's sister and new girlfriend of Bill Townsend
- Janet Hubert as Bev Decatur (seasons 3–5), Helen's mother
- Nikki Estridge as Genevieve Alexander (seasons 3–4)
- Tommi Rose as Olivia Harris (seasons 3–5), Ty's bandmate
- Jodi Benson as Iris Maddox (seasons 4–5), Cal's mother
- Lorraine Rodriguez-Reyes as Beatrice Barrera (seasons 4–5)
- Kamarion Miller as Carter Glass (seasons 4–5)
- Nikita Patel as Priya Webster (season 4)
- Judith Ivey as Bonnie Townsend (season 4), Bill's mother
- Haaron Khan as Dev Webster (seasons 4–5)
- Kyle Findley as Michael Parker (seasons 4–5), Isaac's boyfriend
- Courtney Grace as Courtney Sinclair (season 5), Ronnie's business partner
- Iman Benson as Jessica Whitley (season 5), Erik's niece
- John Gabriel Rodriquez as Clark Bellson (season 5), Dana Sue's rival back in high school
- Aidan Merwarth as Noah Wharton (season 5)
- Austin Woods as Blake Monaghan (season 5)
- Janice Wesley as Miss Eustice (season 5)
- Sam Sneary as Timothy Denison (season 5)

== Episodes ==
=== Series overview ===
Season	Episodes	Originally released
1	10	May 19, 2020
2	10	February 4, 2022
3	10	July 20, 2023
4	10	February 6, 2025
5	10	June 11, 2026

=== Season 1 (2020) ===
No. overall	No. in season	Title	Directed by	Written by	Original release date
1	1	"Pour It Out"	Norman Buckley	Teleplay by : Sheryl J. Anderson	May 19, 2020
Maddie and Bill Townsend are getting a divorce, and are having a disagreement about who is going to keep the house. Luckily for Maddie, Helen, her best friend and divorce lawyer helps her keep the house. Meanwhile, their other best friend, Dana Sue is seen firing her assistant, Brad, at her restaurant, because of stolen whiskey. She has a fight with her daughter, Annie, because Annie's behavior towards the town and its people is not what Dana Sue expected. At the same time, Tyler, Maddie and Bill's eldest son is going through an emotional phase because of his parents' divorce and also talks about giving up on his dream of becoming a baseball player. Dana Sue and Helen get an idea of opening their own spa, with Maddie managing it, but it is too overwhelming for Maddie.
2	2	"A United Front"	Norman Buckley	Shelley Meals	May 19, 2020
3	3	"Give Drink to the Thirsty"	Kelli Williams	Anthony Epling	May 19, 2020
4	4	"Lay It All Down"	Kelli Williams	Francesca Butler	May 19, 2020
5	5	"Dance First, Think Later"	Norman Buckley	Caron Tschampion	May 19, 2020
6	6	"All Best Intentions"	Norman Buckley	Shelley Meals	May 19, 2020
7	7	"Hold My Hand"	Laura Nisbet Peters	Anthony Epling	May 19, 2020
8	8	"What Fools These Mortals Be"	Laura Nisbet Peters	Francesca Butler	May 19, 2020
9	9	"Where You Find Me"	Norman Buckley	Caron Tschampion	May 19, 2020
10	10	"Storms and Rainbows"	Norman Buckley	Sheryl J. Anderson	May 19, 2020
Helen and Ryan decide to break up as he refuses to have children. Bill tries to become a better father for his children. CeCe asks Ty to prom. Kyle and Annie's plan to spend the prom night together is broken when Annie decides to go to prom with Simon, and Kyle decides to spend the evening with Nellie at Lewis' house. Dana Sue's silent partner in Sullivan's needs her to buy him out, and she is forced to call Ronnie so that they can officially divorce. A scouter and longtime friend of Cal's tries recruiting Ty, which leads to a fight between Maddie and Cal. Jackson and his friends, including Ty, Annie, and Simon, crash Kyle and Nellie's party. Isaac asks Dana Sue if she is his mother. Bill asks Maddie to take him back. Jackson provokes a fight with CeCe and Ty, and Kyle intervenes. Ty throws him off, upsetting Kyle, who runs out of the house. The Magnolias and Bill are rushed to the flipped-over car of Ty. Unconscious Kyle is taken onto a stretcher, but the paramedics still do not know who the passenger is, or if they're alive.

=== Season 2 (2022) ===
No. overall	No. in season	Title	Directed by	Written by	Original release date
11	1	"Casseroles and Casualties"	Norman Buckley	Sheryl J. Anderson	February 4, 2022
The Magnolias and Bill are waiting in the hospital for Kyle's diagnosis, and they discover the passenger was Nellie, who only has minor lacerations. Ty, Annie and Jackson arrive at the hospital, and the Lewises blame Jackson for everything. Annie defends him, causing an argument between the parents. Jackson and Ty get into a physical fight resulting in Ty dislocating his shoulder. Kyle wakes up but must remain in hospital. Bill offers to stay with him as Maddie takes Ty home to rest. Ty cries himself to sleep as he realises that he cannot play for the remainder of the season, possibly losing his chances at playing pro. Cal and Maddie make up, and Maddie informs Bill she does not want to get back together. Dana Sue storms out from a margarita night after she defends Annie. Helen tells Maddie she is pregnant.
12	2	"So Much to Say"	Norman Buckley	Anthony Epling	February 4, 2022
With Ty's injury the bulldogs lose their championship. Cal's anger begins to surface.
13	3	"The More Things Change"	Mykelti Williamson	Valerie C. Woods	February 4, 2022
14	4	"Walk of Faith"	Mykelti Williamson	Caron Tschampion	February 4, 2022
15	5	"Great Expectations"	Norman Buckley	Shani Am. Moore	February 4, 2022
16	6	"Find It in Your Heart"	Norman Buckley	Anthony Epling	February 4, 2022
17	7	"Fragile Things"	Yangzom Brauen	Valerie C. Woods	February 4, 2022
18	8	"The Rules of the Game"	Yangzom Brauen	Caron Tschampion	February 4, 2022
19	9	"Dear Heart"	Mary Lou Belli	Shani Am. Moore	February 4, 2022
20	10	"If Thou Wilt, Remember"	Mary Lou Belli	Sheryl J. Anderson	February 4, 2022
Dana Sue, Maddie and Cal talk in Sullivan's about Cal's recent firing as Coach. Cal tries to protect Maddie when crazed fan enters the kitchen, Cal is arrested after the fan attempts to jump Maddie. Meanwhile Dana Sue discovers Miss Frances had left her a surprising gift. Helen is taken by surprise when Ryan returns to town and proposes.

=== Season 3 (2023) ===
No. overall	No. in season	Title	Directed by	Written by	Original release date
21	1	"Meaning to Tell You"	Norman Buckley	Sheryl J. Anderson	July 20, 2023
Helen gets Cal out on bail, the magnolias meet at Helens to regroup. Cal is beside himself unable to fathom how he lost control, especially in front on Maddie. Maddie wants to help him, but he pulls away. Dana Sue tells Ronnie about the cheque and they discuss about the woman vandalizing Sullivans delivery trucks. It's Ronnie's sister, Kathy, she's back and ready for vengeance. Ty visits Cal and berates him for embarrassing his mother. Helen breaks up with Eric and tells Ryan that they should take things slow and try again. she hands him back the engagement ring.
22	2	"Meet Me Where I Am"	Norman Buckley	Caron Tschampion	July 20, 2023
23	3	"The Searchers"	Lauren Petzke	Anthony Epling	July 20, 2023
24	4	"Be Bold"	Lauren Petzke	Barret Helms	July 20, 2023
25	5	"On This Foundation"	Norman Buckley	Shani Am. Moore	July 20, 2023
26	6	"And a Star to Steer Her By"	Norman Buckley	Teleplay by : Caron Tschampion; Story by : Anthony Epling	July 20, 2023
27	7	"Somebody I'm Longing to See"	Joy T. Lane	Anthony Epling	July 20, 2023
28	8	"Beat Me at My Own Game"	Joy T. Lane	Shani Am. Moore	July 20, 2023
29	9	"A Game of Telephone"	Mary Lou Belli	Barret Helms	July 20, 2023
30	10	"Save My Place"	Mary Lou Belli	Sheryl J. Anderson & Sara Jumel	July 20, 2023

=== Season 4 (2025) ===
No. overall	No. in season	Title	Directed by	Written by	Original release date
31	1	"The Other Side of the Veil"	Lauren Petzke	Barret Helms	February 6, 2025
32	2	"Practical Dreams"	Lauren Petzke	Anthony Epling	February 6, 2025
33	3	"Abundant Grace"	Christine Swanson	Kale Futterman	February 6, 2025
34	4	"How Great Thou Art"	Christine Swanson	Bianca Sams	February 6, 2025
35	5	"True North"	Norman Buckley	Barret Helms	February 6, 2025
36	6	"Ring That Bell"	Norman Buckley	Anthony Epling	February 6, 2025
37	7	"Hide and Seek"	JoAnna Garcia Swisher	Alex Rubin	February 6, 2025
38	8	"Walls and Doors"	Matt Drake	Kale Futterman	February 6, 2025
39	9	"Dance Your Sugarplum Off"	Norman Buckley	Sara Jumel	February 6, 2025
40	10	"Do Not Be Afraid"	Norman Buckley	Sheryl J. Anderson	February 6, 2025

=== Season 5 (2026) ===
No. overall	No. in season	Title	Directed by	Written by	Original release date
41	1	"The Magnolias Take Manhattan"	Matt Drake	Barret Helms	June 11, 2026
42	2	"Bigger and Brighter"	Matt Drake	Kale Futterman	June 11, 2026
43	3	"Never Stop Graduating"	Norman Buckley	Alex Rubin	June 11, 2026
44	4	"Swing for the Fences"	Brooke Elliott	Teleplay by : Sheryl J. Anderson; Story by : Michelle Denise Jackson	June 11, 2026
45	5	"Aim Big"	JoAnna Garcia Swisher	Abdi Nazemian	June 11, 2026
46	6	"Smoke and Mirrors"	JoAnna Garcia Swisher	Quincy Cho	June 11, 2026
47	7	"Same Sky"	Norman Buckley	Barret Helms & Sara Jumel	June 11, 2026
48	8	"Everyday, Every Day"	Norman Buckley	Kale Futterman & Alex Rubin	June 11, 2026
49	9	"Common Language"	Lauren Petzke	Sara Jumel	June 11, 2026
50	10	"Come Home"	Lauren Petzke	Sheryl J. Anderson	June 11, 2026

== Production ==
=== Development ===
On September 27, 2018, it was announced that Netflix had given the production a series order for a first season consisting of ten episodes. The series was based on the Sweet Magnolias book series by Sherryl Woods and executive producers were expected to include Woods, Sheryl J. Anderson, and Dan Paulson. Anderson was also set to serve as the series' showrunner. Production companies involved with the series were slated to consist of Daniel L. Paulson Productions. Norman Buckley directed six of the episodes and served as co-executive producer. On July 23, 2020, Netflix renewed the series for a second season. On May 4, 2022, Netflix renewed the series for a third season. On October 19, 2023, Netflix renewed the series for a fourth season. On April 23, 2025, Netflix renewed the series for a fifth season. On September 18, 2026, Netflix canceled the series after five seasons.

=== Casting ===
On May 20, 2019, Monica Potter, Brooke Elliott, and Heather Headley were announced as the leads. On July 1, 2019, it was reported that Chris Klein, Jamie Lynn Spears, and Justin Bruening had joined the cast as series regulars. On August 1, 2019, JoAnna Garcia Swisher was cast as Maddie Townsend, replacing Potter who was originally cast as the lead. On May 4, 2021, Dion Johnstone and Brandon Quinn were promoted to series regulars for second season. On June 9, 2023, it was reported that Ella Grace Helton joined the cast in a recasting, replacing Bianca Berry Tarantino for the third season. On July 22, 2025, it was announced that Jamie-Lynn Sigler, Janice Wesley, Courtney Grace, John Gabriel Rodriquez, Aidan Merwarth, Austin Woods, and Iman Benson were cast in undisclosed capacity roles for the fifth season.

=== Filming ===
Principal photography for the series began on July 8, 2019, in Covington, Georgia.

== Release ==
The series premiered on May 19, 2020. The second season premiered on February 4, 2022. The third season was released on July 20, 2023. The fourth season was released on February 6, 2025. The fifth and final season premiered on June 11, 2026.

== Reception ==
For the first season, review aggregator Rotten Tomatoes reported an approval rating of 78% based on 9 reviews, with an average rating of 6.2/10. The second season has an 80% approval rating on Rotten Tomatoes, based on 5 reviews, with an average rating of 8/10. The third season holds a 57% approval rating on Rotten Tomatoes, based on 7 reviews, with an average rating of 6.3/10. The fourth season has a 100% approval rating on Rotten Tomatoes, based on 5 reviews, with an average rating of 7.2/10.

In its first 30-days on Netflix, season 2 was watched globally on Netflix for 161.3 million hours.
