= Kirk Harris =

American actor

- Born: San Bernardino, California, U.S.
- Occupations: Actor, screenwriter, film director, producer
- Website: fairwayfilmalliance.com

Kirk Harris is an American actor-filmmaker who has been the lead actor in several films that have had arthouse theatrical releases in the U.S.

Harris starred in the 2013 western thriller A Sierra Nevada Gunfight (originally titled The Sorrow) by director Vernon Mortensen. The film was shot in the mountains of Eastern San Diego county. The film was written by Mortensen and Johnny Harrington.

He also starred in The Kid: Chamaco, which was shot in Mexico City by Mexican director and producer Miguel Necoechea. The film was written by Harris, Necoechea and Canadian filmmaker Carl Bessai. A former amateur boxer, Harris played a boxer on-screen for the first time. The film made its United States premiere at the 2010 Palm Springs International Film Festival. The film premiered in theaters in late 2010 and was chosen as a Critics Pick by The New York Times, Chicago Tribune, and Los Angeles Times.

Harris' credits include: The Violent Kind, Intoxicating, Hard Luck, My Sweet Killer, and Harris' own directorial debut, Loser (1996; with Peta Wilson). He was awarded the Best Breakthrough Performance Winner at the Method Fest Independent Film Festival. As a writer, Harris has had five of his screenplays make it to the screen. He also founded Rogue Arts, a film distribution and production company, whose titles include: Three Days of Rain, Flickering Lights, and Con Man.

== Family films ==
Harris is also known for directing animal related family films such as Bernie the Dolphin, a 2018 Canadian adventure drama film starring Patrick Muldoon and Kevin Sorbo and the service dog family drama Dakota.

The first Bernie the Dolphin film spawned a sequel titled Bernie the Dolphin 2 (2019), also directed by Harris.
