= Film Producers Guild =

English filmmaking collective

The Film Producers Guild was a collective of documentary film companies in England. It was formed in August 1944 and had offices and screening facilities on Upper St. Martin's Lane, in London. They owned Merton Park Studios in south London.

Guild producers, directors, writers, cameramen and film editors were part of the British post-war Documentary Film Movement. Peter Morley got his first job in the industry working as a projectionist at the Guild's screening room and met people like Humphrey Jennings, John Grierson, Jill Craigie and Paul Rotha.

== Guild film companies ==
- Verity Films
- Technical & Scientific Films
- Greenpark Productions

== See also ==
- List of film distributors in the United Kingdom
