= Priceless (2016 film) =

- Directed by: Ben Smallbone
- Screenplay by: Chris Dowling; Tyler Poelle
- Story by: Chris Dowling; Tyler Poelle; Joel Smallbone; Luke Smallbone
- Produced by: Steve Barnett; David Smallbone; Luke Smallbone; Cubbie Fink; Garrett Rutherford
- Starring: Joel Smallbone; Bianca Santos; Amber Midthunder; Jim Parrack; David Koechner
- Cinematography: Daniel Stilling
- Edited by: Ben Smallbone; Joel Smallbone
- Music by: For King & Country; I Was the Lion
- Production company: Radiate Films
- Distributed by: Roadside Attractions
- Release date: October 14, 2016 (United States)
- Running time: 97 minutes
- Language: English
- Box office: $1.5 million

Priceless (known also as Priceless: She's Worth Fighting For) is a 2016 American Christian romantic drama film about human trafficking, inspired by true events. It was directed by Ben Smallbone and produced by Steve Barnett with a screenplay by Chris Dowling and Tyler Poelle. Starring singer Joel Smallbone of For King and Country, Bianca Santos, Amber Midthunder, Jim Parrack, and David Koechner, it tells the story of a man who has his life changed when he inadvertently delivers two women into the hands of sex traffickers and resolves to save them.

The film is distributed by Roadside Attractions and received a limited release on October 14, 2016, in North America, to gross $1.5 million in total box office receipts and garner mixed critical reviews.

== Plot summary ==
The story is inspired by true events. James Stevens, after losing his wife and daughter, is unable to hold a steady job and agrees to drive a box truck across the country with no questions asked, then discovers that he is actually "delivering" two girls as part of a human trafficking ring. Stevens then must decide what to do and how to fight to shut down a trafficking ring.

== Cast ==
- Joel Smallbone as James Stevens
- Bianca Santos as Antonia
- Amber Midthunder as Maria
- Jim Parrack as Garo
- David Koechner as Dale
- Sarah Minnich as Amber
- Jodi Lynn Thomas as Kelli
- Travis Hammer as CJ

== Production ==
The film was announced in 2015. It was inspired by director Ben Smallbone's work on a documentary that followed a former pimp who rescued people from human trafficking, and by the band For King & Country's emphasis on respecting women. Joel Smallbone said, "Part of the DNA of For King & Country is this idea of respect and honor in relationships and women being priceless. What we've found in our beliefs as men is that people are made equal. The film continues the idea that no one is a commodity and everyone deserves to be loved and loved well."

It was filmed in Albuquerque, New Mexico, beginning in August 2015. Joel Smallbone, who is originally from Australia, worked with dialect coach Steve Corona to "play a bloke from Houston".

Roadside Attractions acquired the distribution rights to the film in August 2016. Roadside Attractions co-president Howard Cohen said, "'Priceless' is a film that will push those emotional buttons which can engage and transform."

The film was made with four members of the Smallbone family: brothers Joel, Luke, and Ben Smallbone, and their father, David Smallbone.

== Release ==
The film debuted in a limited release in 303 theaters on October 14, 2016.

== Reception ==
=== Box office ===
The film grossed $703,200 from 303 theaters in its opening weekend, with an average of $2,321 per theater.

=== Critical reception ===
The film has received mixed reviews from critics, and has a 40% approval rating on critical review aggregator site Rotten Tomatoes based on 5 reviews. Joe Leydon of Variety magazine gave the film a positive review, calling it "surprisingly involving" and "slickly produced". He wrote, "director Ben Smallbone (brother of the movie's lead player) is adept at generating suspense, particularly during a scene in which James attempts a phone conversation with his daughter while bad guys lurk outside his motel room, and manages to persuasively convey the seediness, desperation, and danger that define the demimonde that Garo rules with a whim of iron. To put it another way: Priceless achieves greater impact through understatement and implication than many other similarly plotted movies do with R-rated explicitness."

Susan Wloszczyna of RogerEbert.com was negative about the film, criticizing it as "cheap and generic." She wrote, "The main intention behind 'Priceless,' besides allowing For King & Country to become involved in the movie business, seems to be a genuine desire to raise awareness of the horrors of the crime of trafficking, not that this PG-13 drama shows anything too graphic. But, on a purely entertainment level, all I know is when the end credits started rolling, I said to myself, 'Thank God.'"

Kimber Myers of the Los Angeles Times was more positive, characterizing it as a "lean drama that relies more on emotion than well-crafted dialogue or character development" and saying, "Though its obvious message may not translate well outside its intended audience, the converted will likely be entertained by the well-produced package the moving themes are delivered in."

== Accompanying media ==
For King and Country recorded Priceless, a song which serves on the film's soundtrack. It was released as a single, and has reached #4 on the Hot Christian Songs chart.

The film was adapted into a novel, titled Priceless: She's Worth Fighting For, which was released on September 6, 2016.

The Hindi remake rights are owned by Dharma Productions which will star Rajkummar Rao and Huma Qureshi.
