= Logan Allen (actor) =

American actor (born 2004)

Logan Allen (born July 17, 2004), is an American actor, writer and director. On television, he portrayed Kyle Towsend and Jake in the Netflix series Sweet Magnolias and Stranger Things respectively. He also appeared in the television series Talia in the Kitchen and played Kevin Ryan in the film Bernie the Dolphin (2018).

== Filmography ==
=== Film ===
Year	Title	Role	Notes
2014	Birthday Boy	Classmate	Short film
2014	Don't Tell Your Mother	Barry	Short film
2014	Fit Arcade Gone Wild	Zeek	Short film
2018	Bernie the Dolphin	Kevin Ryan	
2019	Bernie the Dolphin 2	Kevin Ryan	

=== Television ===
Year	Title	Role	Notes
2015	Talia in the Kitchen	Cousin Vinnie	7 episodes
2019	Creepshow	Harold	1 episode
2022	Stranger Things	Jake	3 episodes
2020–2026	Sweet Magnolias	Kyle Townsend	Series regular
