= Little Dead Rotting Hood =

2016 horror film directed by Jared Cohn

- Official release poster
- Directed by: Jared Cohn
- Written by: Gabriel Campisi
- Based on: Little Red Riding Hood by Charles Perrault and by Brothers Grimm
- Produced by: Paul Bales; David Michael Latt; David Rimawi; Doug Burdinski; Nigina Niyazmatova
- Starring: Eric Balfour; Bianca Santos; Romeo Miller; Patrick Muldoon; Heather Tom; Marina Sirtis
- Cinematography: Laura Beth Love
- Edited by: Rod Pallatina
- Music by: Christopher Cano; Chris Ridenhour
- Production company: The Asylum
- Distributed by: The Asylum
- Release date: January 5, 2016
- Running time: 88 minutes
- Country: United States
- Language: English
- Box office: $23,464

Little Dead Rotting Hood is a 2016 American horror film written by Gabriel Campisi and directed by Jared Cohn. It stars Eric Balfour, Bianca Santos, Romeo Miller, Patrick Muldoon, Heather Tom and Marina Sirtis.

The film is a mockbuster of the Warner Bros. romance horror film Red Riding Hood.

== Plot ==
The film follows the story of a small town that is besieged by a mysterious creature, which has been killing people in the woods. The town's sheriff, Adam (played by Eric Balfour), and his team of deputies, along with a group of local hunters, set out to stop the creature and protect the town.

As the investigation progresses, it becomes clear that the creature is actually a werewolf, and the only way to stop it is to kill the person who has been infected. The person in question turns out to be Red Riding Hood (played by Bianca A. Santos), the granddaughter of the town's wise woman, Rose (played by Marina Sirtis).

As the full moon approaches, the werewolf becomes more powerful, and the town is thrown into chaos as more and more people are killed. Adam and his team must race against time to find Red Riding Hood and stop the werewolf before it's too late.

As the climax approaches, Adam and his team confront the werewolf in an epic battle. In the end, the werewolf is defeated, but not before it manages to kill a number of people, including one of Adam's deputies.

The film ends with Adam and his team standing over the body of the defeated werewolf, contemplating the losses suffered by the town, and wondering if there are more monsters out there waiting to be discovered.

== Cast ==
- Eric Balfour as Sheriff Adam
- Bianca Santos as Samantha / Red Rotting Hood
- Romeo Miller as Danny
- Patrick Muldoon as Deputy Henry
- Heather Tom as Officer Victoria
- Marina Sirtis as Grandma
- Danielle Vasinova as Denise
- Izabella Alvarez as Kendra
- Brendan Wayne as Officer Scudder
- Amy Argyle as Becky
- Tony Ketcham as Benson
- Jake T. Getman as Dustin "Dusty"
- Taylor Carr as Rita
- Ashley Doris as Jenny
- Demetrius Stear as Tommy
- Baker Chase Powell as Ramiro
- Kevin Ragsdale as Lance
- Kali Cook as Anna
- Steven Skyler as Alex
- Carl Donelson as Jason
- Amy Landon as Deputy Abbey
- Tammy Klein as Mildred
- M.J. Brackin as Martha (credited as M.J. Backin)

== Reception ==
Phil Wheat of Nerdly wrote:

A fast-paced action-horror, Little Dead Rotting Hood builds to a final crescendo that will leave audiences satisfied and best of all, the film leaves things open for further adventures of Samantha and her fight against the werewolf hoards…

We Are Indie Horror wrote:

Little Dead Rotting Hood takes almost nothing from the classic story, simply keeping the character and the Lycan aspect for its own usage, and doing something fun and off-the-wall, which is something seldom seen in reboots, remakes, or reimaginings.
