= Diffusion Pictures =

- Company type: Private
- Industry: Motion pictures, television
- Founded: London, United Kingdom (2006)
- Headquarters: London
- Key people: Nick Crossley, co-founder Jono Stevens, co-founder
- Website: diffusionpictures.co.uk

Diffusion Pictures is a distributor of feature films in the United Kingdom. Formed in late 2006, its first two releases, Funny Ha Ha and Mutual Appreciation, were both from American director Andrew Bujalski. Diffusion then released Reprise by Norwegian director, Joachim Trier and Lars von Trier's film, The Boss of It All.

The company's other releases include a documentary on Francis Bacon, the film from Beastie Boy, Adam Yauch, Gunnin For That #1 Spot and Azazel Jacobs' Momma's Man.

== Films ==
- Funny Ha Ha (2007)
- Mutual Appreciation (2007)
- Reprise (2007)
- The Boss of It All (2007)
- Bacon's Arena (2008)
- Gunnin For That #1 Spot (2008)
- Momma's Man (2008)
