= Bernie the Dolphin =

- Poster
- Directed by: Kirk Harris
- Written by: Marty Poole; Terri Emerson
- Produced by: Marty Poole; Tony Armer
- Starring: Lola Sultan; Patrick Muldoon; Logan Allen; Kevin Sorbo; Sean Michael Gloria
- Cinematography: Brandon D. Hyde
- Edited by: Kurt Nishimura; Domonic Smith
- Music by: Joshua Mosley
- Distributed by: Grindstone Entertainment Group; Lionsgate Home Entertainment
- Release date: December 7, 2018
- Running time: 88 minutes
- Countries: Canada; United States
- Language: English

Bernie the Dolphin is a 2018 Canadian-American adventure drama film directed by Kirk Harris and starring Lola Sultan, Patrick Muldoon, Logan Allen and Kevin Sorbo. It tells the story of two kids who help a sunburned dolphin while also stumbling upon an evil plot by a crooked real-estate mogul and the mayor of their town.

A sequel called Bernie the Dolphin 2 was released in 2019.

== Plot ==
A brother and sister named Kevin and Holly Ryan are kayaking with dolphins near St. Augustine, Florida and are filming on a nearby island and discover a real-estate mogul named Winston Mills, who has big plans for the cove. When they kayak back home, a boat causes them to fall into the water, and a dolphin saves Holly from drowning.

Their father Bob, grounds them from kayaking for coming home late and not wearing life vests, but Holly gets a bad feeling that something is wrong with one of the dolphins. Their mom, Abby, takes them on her boat, and Holly discovers one of the dolphins is missing, and she and Kevin put up missing dolphin posters all over town, and they find out that the dolphin is sunburned and being taken care of at the local marine park Marineland.

Meanwhile, Winston, who is Bob's boss, tells him that he is planning to build an ocean park, and wants to get permission from Bob's old college quarterback friend Luke Lawson who owns that land, as a way for Bob to get a Vice President promotion, but Kevin and Holly are not excited about the ocean park idea, and they want to help the dolphin recover and reunite him with his family. They name him Bernie.

While filming Bernie's family as part of a plan to reunite the two, they discover Winston and the mayor, Brock Winters, discussing plans to steal turtle eggs and Winston steals Kevin's camera to prevent them from ratting him out.

Meanwhile, Bob visits Luke Lawson about building the park on his property, and gets him to sign the rights to the land. The kids try to tell him about Winston's plan, but he announces his VP promotion and he celebrates by taking the family out on the boat, where the kids discover their filming area is empty.

Later that night, Kevin makes a plan to get his camera back from Winston, and he and Holly break into his office, and they overhear from Winston that their dad signed away permission to build an illegal chemical plant instead of an ocean park, and Winston catches them in his office, but they manage to escape and run into Sidney, their friend from Marineland, and Winston manages to catch up to them and try to get the camera back, but he breaks Sidney's phone in the process.

Sidney takes the kids home and Abby offers to fix her phone and Bob does not believe the kid's story, but Abby does, and Sidney backs up their story. Bob confronts Winston the next day about the illegal chemical plant he is building, and Winston threatens to have him thrown in jail with him since Bob signed permission for it. Bob kicks him in the knee and quits.

Abby manages to fix Sidney's phone and Kevin and Holly takes it to her and shows her the evidence and she reveals that he also wants to buy Marineland. Bob apologizes to them for not believing them, but says it's not enough evidence to convict Winston. Abby suggests using Kevin's sea mammal footage for more evidence, and Bob tells the truth to a detective and gets protection from the police while Winston and Mayor Winters are arrested alongside a third unidentified person who was caught stealing sea turtle eggs.

Meanwhile, Bernie is fully recovered from his sunburn and the Ryans go out on the ocean to look for his family and Kevin and Holly are interviewed about exposing Winston and the mayor's evil plans and their plan to release Bernie into the wild, and they later find them on the beach. Bernie is reunited with his family while a bunch of spectators watch on the beach.

== Cast ==
- Lola Sultan as Holly Ryan
- Patrick Muldoon as Bob Ryan
- Logan Allen as Kevin Ryan
- Kevin Sorbo as Winston Mills
- Dahlia Legault as Abby Ryan
- Stelio Savante as Brock Winters
- Sean Michael Gloria as Jimmy
- Sam Sorbo as Sandy Pierce
- Shane Sorbo as Mikey
- Lily Cardone as Sidney Simms
- Owen Harn as Luke Lawson
- Vincent De Paul as Detective Wyatt
- Darla Delgado as Summer Sands

== Production ==
The film was shot in St. Augustine, Florida, Clearwater, Florida and Marineland of Florida. Filming also occurred in St. Petersburg, Florida, as well as Palm Harbor, Florida. Filming began in January 2018.

== Release ==
In February 2018, it was announced that Grindstone Entertainment Group and Lionsgate Home Entertainment would handle North American distribution of the film. The film was released in select theaters on December 7, 2018.

== Reception ==
Tara McNamara of Common Sense Media awarded the film two stars out of five and wrote, "Amiable eco-tale is wholesome but lackluster."

== Sequel ==
The film spawned a sequel titled Bernie the Dolphin 2 (2019).
