= Last Will (film) =

- Directed by: Brent Huff
- Screenplay by: Alan Moskowitz
- Story by: Irmgard Pagan
- Produced by: Irmgard Pagan; Miguel Pagan
- Starring: Tatum O'Neal; Peter Coyote; Patrick Muldoon; James Brolin; Tom Berenger
- Cinematography: Andrew Huebscher
- Edited by: Tony Wise
- Music by: Pinar Toprak
- Distributed by: Moviecid
- Release date: May 7, 2011 (Spain)
- Country: United States
- Language: English
- Budget: $5 million

Last Will is a 2011 mystery drama film starring Tatum O'Neal and Tom Berenger. It was shot in Kansas City, Missouri on a modest budget.

== Plot ==
A woman named Hayden is framed for the murder of her wealthy husband Frank. With all the evidence stacked against her, Detective Sloan arrests her and Hayden finds herself in the fight of her life as she tries to uncover the truth. Set against the backdrop of a wealthy Midwestern city, Last Will tells a story of deception, corruption and misguided family loyalties.

== Cast ==
- Tatum O'Neal as Hayden Emery
- Tom Berenger as Frank Emery
- Patrick Muldoon as Joseph Emery
- Peter Coyote as Judge Garner
- Shawn Huff as Laurie Faber
- William Shockley as Michael Palmer
- Jeffery Dean as Virgil Emery
- James Brolin as Det. Sloan
- Moon Zappa as Belinda DeNovi

== Reception ==
Horrorphilia said "If you are looking for a twisted thriller with some top-notch actors, do yourself a favor and look for ‘Last Will’. The ending twist was good and maybe if you pay close attention, it won't sneak up on you. Although what happened after the big reveal...I bet you don't see it coming! 4 Out of 5!"
