= Randolph Mantooth =

American actor (1945–2026)

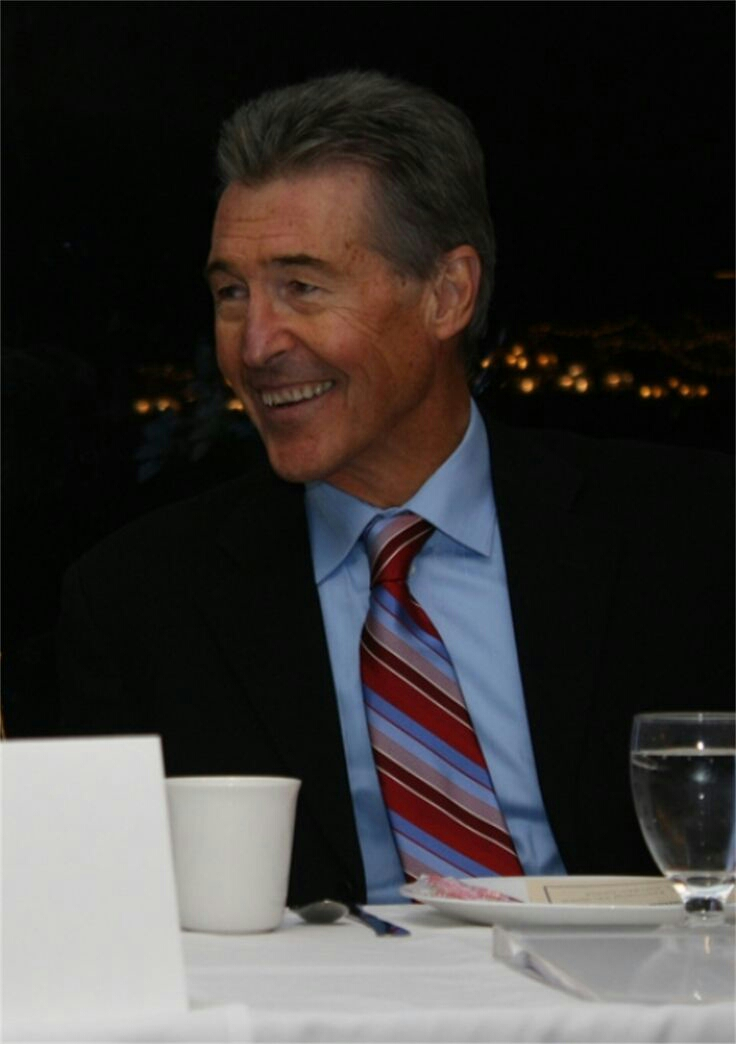
- Mantooth in 2014
- Born: Randy DeRoy Mantooth; September 19, 1945; Sacramento, California, U.S.
- Died: July 9, 2026 (aged 80); Ventura, California, U.S.
- Education: San Marcos High School
- Alma mater: Santa Barbara City College; American Academy of Dramatic Arts
- Occupations: Actor; writer; speaker
- Years active: 1960s–2016
- Known for: Emergency!; Loving; Operation Petticoat
- Spouses: Rose Parra (m. 1978–1991) Kristen Connors (m. 2002)
- Relatives: Tonya Mantooth (sister); Donald Mantooth (brother)

Randy DeRoy Mantooth (September 19, 1945 – July 9, 2026), known professionally as Randolph Mantooth, was an American actor who worked in television, documentaries, theater, and film for more than 50 years. A graduate of the American Academy of Dramatic Arts, he was discovered in New York by a Universal Studios talent agent while performing the lead in the play Philadelphia, Here I Come! After signing with Universal and moving back to California, he slowly built up his resume with work on such dramatic series as Adam-12 (1968); Marcus Welby, M.D. (1969); McCloud (1970); and Alias Smith and Jones (1971).

Mantooth portrayed paramedic John Gage in the 1970s medical drama Emergency! and spoke regularly at firefighter and EMS conferences and symposia across the United States while maintaining an active acting career. He was a spokesperson for both the International Association of Fire Fighters (IAFF) and the International Association of Fire Chiefs (IAFC) for firefighter health and safety, and was honored over the years with numerous awards and recognition.

He appeared in numerous films and television series in lead and supportive roles including miniseries adaptations of Testimony of Two Men (1977) and a starring role as Abraham Kent in The Seekers (1979). Through the 1990s and 2000s, he appeared in daytime soap operas, earning him four Soap Opera Digest Awards nominations. He frequently returned to performing in theatrical productions. He served as an associate artist at Jeff Daniels' Purple Rose Theatre. His performances include Mark Kaufman's Evil Little Thoughts, Black Elk Speaks, Carey Crim's Morning after Grace, Lanford Wilson's Rain Dance, and numerous works by Native American playwrights including William S. Yellow Robe Jr.

== Early life ==
Mantooth, the oldest of four children, was born as Randy DeRoy Mantooth in Sacramento, California, in 1945, to Sadie (née Neddenreip) from Nebraska, of German and English descent, and Donald "Buck" Mantooth, who was Cherokee and Seminole.

Mantooth attended San Marcos High School and participated in school plays. Following his studies at Santa Barbara City College, he received a scholarship to the American Academy of Dramatic Arts in New York. It was there that he chose to change his first name from "Randy" to the stage name "Randolph", keeping his last name.

His performance as Gar in the play Philadelphia, Here I Come! earned him the Charles Jehlenger Award for Best Actor, an honor he shared with fellow actor Brad Davis.

Mantooth's earlier jobs included work as an elevator operator at the Madison Avenue Baptist Church and as a page at NBC Studios at Rockefeller Center in New York City. His very first paying job in life was as a newspaper boy for the local paper, the Coatesville Record, in Coatesville, Pennsylvania.

== Career ==
=== Early work (1970s) ===
Mantooth was discovered in New York City by Universal Studios' talent agent Eleanor Kilgallen (sister of Dorothy Kilgallen) while playing the lead in the play Philadelphia, Here I Come! After signing with Universal and moving back to California, he slowly built up his resume with work on such dramatic series as Adam-12 (1968), Marcus Welby, M.D. (1969), McCloud (1970) and Alias Smith and Jones (1971).

This led to television stardom on the popular Emergency! series in 1972 which aired on NBC for six seasons. He earned further roles in two series. Mantooth portrayed Lt. Mike Bender on Operation Petticoat (1977) and as Eddie Dawkins on Detective School (1979). He was featured as a guest performer on episodic television. He appeared on several programs including Sierra, Cos, The Love Boat, Battlestar Galactica and Vega$.

=== Emergency! (1972–1979) ===
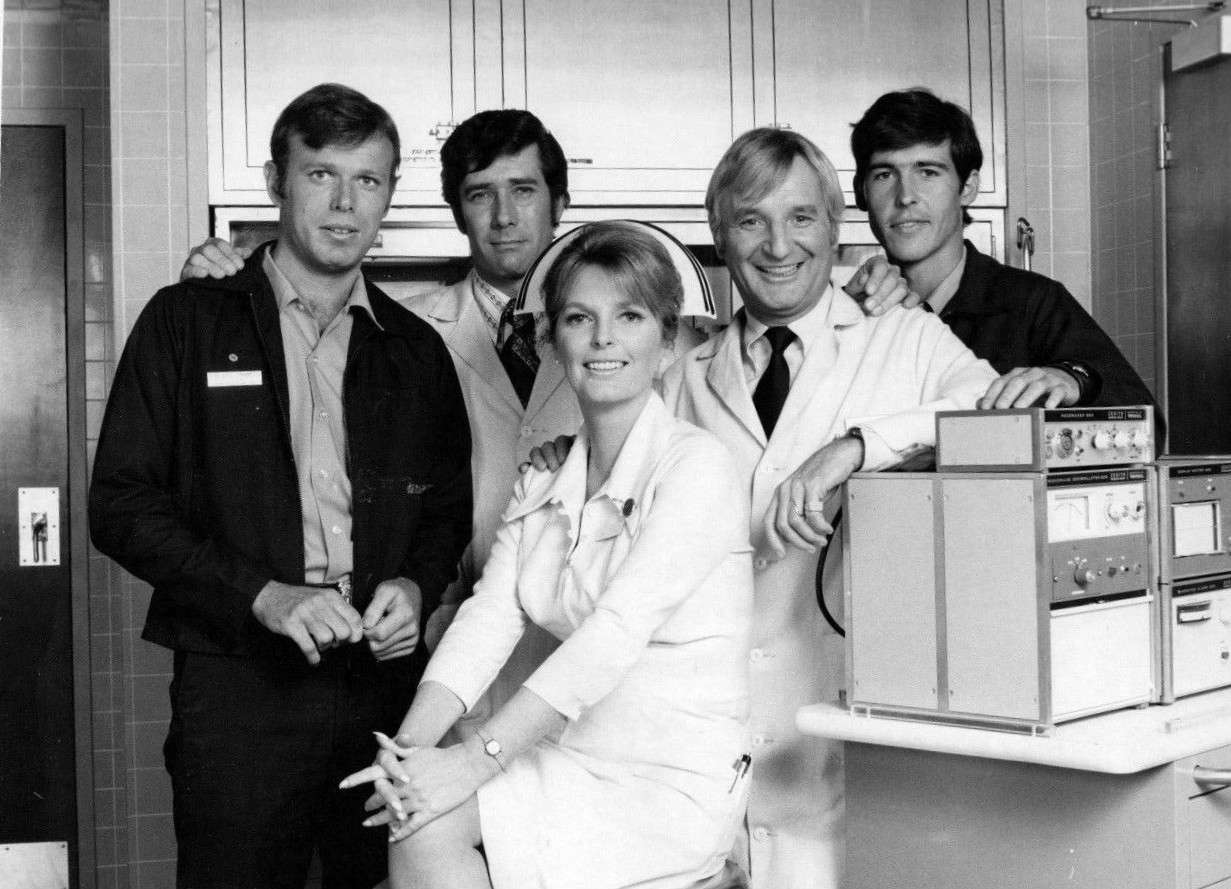
Cast of TV's Emergency! (1973), L-R: Kevin Tighe, Robert Fuller, Julie London, Bobby Troup and Randolph Mantooth

Producer Robert A. Cinader saw Randolph Mantooth in a small role on The Bold Ones opposite Hal Holbrook that led to his decision to cast him as paramedic John Gage on Emergency!. Mantooth and Kevin Tighe were part of a paramedic team assigned to Squad 51 of the Los Angeles County Fire Department. Responding to accidents or dangerous rescues in an "emergency room on wheels" with directions via biophone from medical personnel at a hospital, the paramedics performed Advanced Life Support (ALS) techniques to stabilize injured, ill, and dying patients before transporting them to a medical facility.

To train for their parts Mantooth and Tighe sat in on paramedic classes and rode out with the LA County Fire Department. In an interview with Tom Blixa of WTVN, Mantooth said that the producer wanted them to train so that they would at least know the fundamentals and look like they knew what they were doing on camera. Mantooth mentioned that unless you take the written course you are not a paramedic and that "if anyone has a heart attack, I'll call 911 with the best of them". According to authors Richard Yokley and Roxane Sutherland who wrote the book, Emergency! Behind the Scenes, the show Emergency! is an important chapter in television history.

At the time of the series' world premiere in 1972, there were only 12 paramedic units in North America located in four municipalities. Ten years later, more than half of all Americans were within ten minutes of a paramedic rescue or ambulance unit, due to the influence of the show. The program introduced audiences from all over the world to the concept of pre-hospital care, along with fire prevention and CPR.

The show ran six seasons (129 episodes) with seven two-hour television movie specials including the premiere film (EMERGENCY! – World Premiere), with a national audience that averaged 30 million viewers each week. Mantooth directed two episodes of Emergency!; "The Nuisance" (1976) and "Insanity Epidemic" (1977), and directed the television movie Greatest Rescues of Emergency (1978). Mantooth and Tighe did many of their own stunts in the early years with the rule of thumb, "if you could see our faces, it was us doing the stunts; if you couldn't, it was our stunt doubles." He was offered an opportunity after Emergency! went off the air to be an actual firefighter, but decided to continue with acting.

Nearly 30 years after Emergency! debuted, the Smithsonian Institution accepted Emergency! memorabilia into its American History Museum in the public service division and not entertainment on May 16, 2000. Items inducted at the Smithsonian included their uniforms, scripts, helmets, turnouts, biophone, and defibrillator.

In conjunction to the induction of the equipment from Emergency! at the Smithsonian, Project 51 was created in an effort to raise funds for a children's burn charity, and exhibit the restored squad truck around the country. Mantooth, along with Marco Lopez, Tim Donnelly, Ron Pinkard and Mike Stoker, embarked on a 10-city tour with the squad to raise funds for charity on their way to Washington, D.C., with their final destination being the Smithsonian. Project 51 folded after the equipment was inducted into the Smithsonian and the funds were distributed to burn centers, fire education projects, and museums.

In 2012, Mantooth and Tighe were presented with traditional white leather Cairns chiefs' helmets by the Los Angeles County Fire Department as Honorary Fire Chiefs of the department. The honor was bestowed on the men for their contributions to the fire service and emergency medicine through educating and inspiring children and adults to be firefighters, EMTs, or paramedics. The series contributed to the revolution in emergency medicine and mobile emergency health care across the country.

The series was placed into syndication in 1977 as Emergency! One to some local stations in the late 1970s. It was called Emergency! One because the show was still filming new episodes in the United States. After the show ended, the name reverted to Emergency! The show was sold overseas and aired in a number of countries, including Germany where it was renamed Notruf California, in addition to being dubbed in Spanish in the United States.

In the late 1990s and 2000s, Emergency! began airing on cable and digital sub-channels networks that included TV Land, RTV, MeTV, and Cozi TV. Emergency! spun off an animated version called Emergency +4 aired on NBC Saturday mornings from 1973 to 1976, with Mantooth and Kevin Tighe voicing the animated characters of John Gage and Roy DeSoto. Starship Rescue aired in 1973 to promote NBC's fall lineup of Saturday morning programs focusing on Emergency! and Star Trek: The Animated Series and it was hosted by Mantooth and Tighe. Tighe and Mantooth also presented the work of firefighters and paramedics from the Los Angeles County Fire Department on the NBC Saturday morning children's series Go!.

Mantooth's and Tighe's likenesses were used for games, puzzles, lunch boxes, action figures, and comic books connected to the series. The comic books for Emergency focused on the primary actors from Rampart Hospital, along with Johnny and Roy. The four comic books, and four magazines, were issued by Charlton Comics in 1976. Some of the issues were drawn by John Byrne and Neal Adams. Emergency! +4 and Emergency! both had coloring books that were created to promote the series to young viewers using the likenesses of the five principal characters. Viewmaster released a series of reels that had film stills of the show arranged in a story or photo montage.

Mantooth and Kevin Tighe's characters John Gage and Roy DeSoto appeared on another Robert A. Cinader created series, Sierra. The series focused on National Park Service Rangers stationed in the Sierras. Mantooth and Tighe appeared in the episode, "Urban Rangers". Mantooth's character appeared on a crossover episode of Adam-12 called "Lost and Found".

The on-screen camaraderie between Mantooth and Tighe, as well as their friendship with both London and Troup, carried over to real life as well. Before London's and Troup's deaths, all four remained close friends after the series came to a close, and Tighe served as best man at Mantooth's second wedding in 2002.

While talking with Tom Blixa of WTVN, Mantooth said that at first it was a little intimidating working with Robert Fuller, Bobby Troup and Julie London, because they were all big stars, but after doing a series with them for seven years they all became like family. In the same interview, while discussing happenings behind the scenes and blooper reels, Mantooth said there was "a lot of salty language though"..."and we learned every bad word from Julie London"..."I love her to death but she herself said 'I'm a broad'".

=== 1980s to 2026 ===
Mantooth appeared in the miniseries adaptations of Taylor Caldwell's 1968 novel Testimony of Two Men (1977) and John Jakes' novel The Seekers (1979–80). The adaptation of The Seekers featured Mantooth in the starring role as Abraham Kent.

Through the 1980s, Mantooth made guest-star appearances on a number of televisions series including Charlie's Angels, Fantasy Island, three appearances on The Fall Guy, Dallas, Murder, She Wrote and L.A. Law.

He moved back to New York where he explored a new direction in his career with daytime soap operas, earning him four Soap Opera Digest Award nominations. He played Clay Alden on Loving from 1987–1990, during the time that the character Clay Alden was actually Alex Masters. Mantooth described the character as a "good guy with an edge."

Mantooth left Loving for personal reasons in 1990, before returning to the show in 1993, this time in the role of Alex Masters. The series was later revamped and titled The City, and it lasted for two more years before folding in 1997. His character, Alex Masters, did several crossover episodes on One Life to Live in 1997.

He appeared on General Hospital, One Life to Live and As the World Turns, where he played both good guys and villains. In 2003, Mantooth joined the cast of As the World Turns as a temporary replacement for Benjamin Hendrickson in the role of Hal Munson. When Hendrickson left the series in 2004, Mantooth returned to the series as Munson, in a recurring position until Hendrickson returned to the program in 2005. In 2007, Mantooth landed the recurring role of Kirk Harmon on One Life to Live.

Besides his work on daytime in the 1990s, Mantooth starred in television movies such as White Cobra Express and portrayed Bing Tupper in both the movie Before the Storm and the series Under Cover. He starred in a CBS Schoolbreak Special as Mr. Leland in "Please, God, I'm Only Seventeen". In 1999, he played Solonsky in the feature film Enemy Action. Mantooth also made guest appearances on series such as China Beach, MacGyver, Baywatch, Diagnosis: Murder, JAG, Promised Land and Walker, Texas Ranger during the 1990s.

In 2000, Mantooth played Ken Crandall in the television movie Bitter Suite (original title Time Share), and in 2007, he played Dutch Fallon in the television movie Fire Serpent. Feature film roles include Admiral Edwards in Agent Red (2000), Dr. Willis in He Was a Quiet Man (2007), Ambassador Cartwright in Scream of the Bikini (2009), Richard Cranehill in Bold Native (2010), and Detective Bodrogi in Killer Holiday (2013). Mantooth also starred on series such as ER, Criminal Minds, Ghost Whisperer, and most recently as Charlie Horse in Sons of Anarchy in 2011.

From 2012, the actor represented the Seminole Nation on the American Indian Advisory Board at the San Diego International Film Festival. His sister Tonya is the CEO and artistic director of the Festival. In 2015 Mantooth was raising funds for a screenplay that focused on Indian gambling, called The Bone Game.

=== Theatre ===
Mantooth frequently returned to his theatre roots in such productions as Arsenic and Old Lace at the Alhambra Dinner Theatre in 1983, and The Man With The Dirty Mind with Don Knotts and Rue McClanahan. In 1984, Mantooth worked with David Carradine and Will Sampson, along with Native actors, in a production of Black Elk Speaks for the American Indian Theatre Company in Tulsa, Oklahoma. Mantooth continued to do theatre with roles in a variety of plays including Edith Villareal's Crazy from the Heart at the Yale Repertory Theatre in 1986, and Mark Kaufman's Evil Little Thoughts at the Denver Center Theatre in 1991, Mantooth, along with James Van Der Beek performed Lanford Wilson's Rain Dance off-Broadway at the Signature Theatre. Mantooth has also performed in three works written by William S. Yellow Robe, Jr.: The Pendleton Blanket, Wink-Dah and The Independence of Eddie Rose.

He performed with Donna Couteau in Footprints in Blood for the American Indian Theatre Company (AITCO) at the Old Lady of Brady Theatre in Tulsa, Oklahoma. Mantooth portrayed Dr. Charles Western in Gary Leon Hill's Back to the Blankets at the Denver Center Theatre in 1991. Mantooth performed in two additional plays: The Paper Crown and The Inuit.

Mantooth was an Associate Artist of The Purple Rose Theatre Company in Chelsea, Michigan, since 2003. Mantooth completed a three-month run of Tracy Letts's Superior Donuts in 2012 at the theater. Mantooth performed in Carey Crim's Morning after Grace at the Purple Rose Theatre in the Fall 2016.

== Personal life and death ==
Mantooth married Rosemarie A. Parra on July 1, 1978; they were divorced in 1991. In 2002, he married Kristen Connors.

In 2013, Mantooth's mother, Sadie Mantooth, died at age 90. The Los Angeles County Fire Museum received a special donation from him dedicated to the memory of his mother.

In 2015, Mantooth revealed that he had been diagnosed with cancer earlier in the year, had completed treatment, and was heading toward a recovery.

Mantooth died of complications from pneumonia at a hospice facility in Ventura, California, on July 9, 2026, at the age of 80. He was interred at Santa Barbara Cemetery.

=== Firefighter/EMS advocate and spokesperson ===
In addition to Mantooth working as an actor for over forty years, he remained an advocate of firefighters, paramedics, EMTs, and other emergency medical services providers. He made speeches and personal appearances each year at events across the country, discussing the "inside story of the development of the television series Emergency! and its impact on the EMS system development". Having worked closely with the nation's first certified firefighter/paramedics, who served as technical advisors on the set of Emergency!, Mantooth brought a perspective and insight into the startup and history of pre-hospital treatment in the field. He worked alongside influential men who made a difference ... men he greatly admired ... the late Robert A. Cinader, creator and executive producer of Emergency!, and the man known as the Father of Modern Emergency Medical Services, close friend and mentor, the late James O. Page. According to A.J. Heightman, Editor-in-Chief, Journal of Emergency Medical Services (JEMS), "Randy Mantooth is one of the strongest reminders of how America turned the dedicated delivery of basic emergency care into a systematic approach to EMS and Advanced Life Support."

Mantooth's dedication to promoting and advocating for the fire service and EMS was shown through personal reasons: "I owe an incredible debt to firefighters, EMTs, and paramedics... so that's a debt that no one can really pay back, but you can try. That's why it's so important for me to do what I do." Mantooth referenced his own life being saved from carbon monoxide poisoning at home during the run of Emergency!, in addition to paramedics and a flight nurse saving his sister's life after she was involved in a car accident. Mantooth also advocated for the health and safety of firefighters and educating on the dangers of carbon monoxide poisoning and secondary effects of low level CO poisoning. In association with Masimo Corporation, he spoke on carbon monoxide poisoning nationwide. Masimo Corporation funded a video, narrated by Mantooth, regarding the dangers of carbon monoxide to educate firefighters.

Mantooth served as a spokesperson for the International Association of Firefighters (IAFF) on Health and Safety. He was honored over the years with numerous awards and recognition, most recently the James O. Page Award of Excellence from the International Association of Fire Chiefs (IAFC), EMS section. He was a lifetime member of the National Association of Emergency Medical Technicians (NAEMT) and a lifetime member of the Washington, D.C.-based Advocates for EMS. He "accepts the accolades with gracious deference to those he considers our true heroes". Mantooth served as honorary chairman and spokesperson for the non-profit County of Los Angeles Fire Museum Association.

His work as an advocate for firefighters and EMTs also extended to Native American peoples. In May 2012, he filmed an Emergency Preparedness video with Monte Fronk in Minnesota at the Mille Lacs Ojibwe Reservation to be distributed to tribal leaders. The project was funded through a public health education grant through the University of Minnesota. Mantooth served as a moderator in a project done in conjunction with the Los Angeles County Fire Museum, called Pioneers of Paramedicine, which was an effort to document and record the history of the paramedicine program. Originally filmed in 2001, with additional scenes filmed in 2013, this featured discussions with four doctors: Eugene Nagel, M.D. from Miami; Leonard Cobb, M.D., Seattle; J. Michael Criley, M.D., Los Angeles; and Walter Graf, M.D., in Los Angeles. These doctors pioneered the idea of mobile pre-hospital medicine and paramedics based on early ideas in Northern Ireland and Russia.

== Awards and nominations ==
Year	Award	Category	Show	Role	Result	Ref.
1990	Soap Opera Digest	Outstanding Hero: Daytime	Loving	Clay Alden/Alex Masters	Nominated	
1995	Soap Opera Digest	Outstanding Supporting Actor	Loving	Clay Alden/Alex Masters	Nominated	
1996	Soap Opera Digest	Outstanding Male Scene Stealer	Loving	Clay Alden/Alex Masters	Nominated	
1997	Soap Opera Digest	Outstanding Supporting Actor	The City	Alex Masters	Nominated	
