= Project Viper =

- DVD cover art
- Genre: Action; Horror; Sci-fi; Thriller
- Written by: Curtis Joseph; David Mason
- Directed by: Jim Wynorski (as Jay Andrews)
- Starring: Patrick Muldoon; Theresa Russell
- Music by: Neal Acree
- Country of origin: United States
- Original language: English

Production
- Executive producers: Steven Paul; Datty Ruth; John Paul Pettinato
- Producers: Paul Hertzberg; Lisa M. Hansen
- Cinematography: Mario D'ayala
- Editor: Craig Kitson
- Running time: 85 minutes
- Production companies: CineTel Films; Crystal Sky Pictures; VCL Communications

Original release
- Network: Sci Fi Channel
- Release: April 20, 2002

Project Viper is a 2002 science-fiction thriller starring Patrick Muldoon, Theresa Russell, Curtis Armstrong and Tamara Davies that debuted as a Sci Fi Pictures TV-movie on the Sci Fi Channel. It was directed by Jim Wynorski under the pseudonym "Jay Andrews".

== Plot ==
The Space Shuttle Olympus is on a routine mission, but with a far-from-routine payload: "Project Viper", an experimental hybrid of human genes and computer chips, designed to adapt to any environment, particularly that of the planet Mars. But as the shuttle crew prepares to launch the first prototype, referred to as "Viper", into space, an unexpected power glitch occurs, causing the container housing the prototype to break open. Soon the astronauts are killed by Viper, and the Secretary of Defense orders the remaining second prototype Viper destroyed - which is stored in a secure NovaGen Science facility, the manufacturer of the prototype. To do the job, he calls on special agent Mike Connors.

Unaware of these proceedings, Project Viper head Nancy Burnham and her team at NovaGen - Steve Elkins, Sid Bream and Alan Stanton - are celebrating the fruition of their scientific dream. One more member, Cafferty, is on her way - but is killed by a rogue police officer, who is planning to steal the second prototype. Along with his wife, he steals the second Viper from the NovaGen high security lab, shooting several guards and technicians in the process. Mike Connors arrives at the scene, only to chase the thieves into a nearby forest, Though the rogue police officer is killed, his wife escapes along with Viper's container unscathed and unseen by Connors and military personnel. Along with another accomplice, the thieves steal a small cargo plane and head towards their base, but a catastrophic engine failure causes their aircraft to crash into a forest 50 miles north of the Mexican border near a small town of Lago Nogales. In the crash, Viper's container is broken open and ends up into the environment, killing and devouring the thieves and a couple.

Connors, Burnham and crew arrive at the crash site to investigate and trace Viper's trails of gray, gelatinous remains to the small town. After carrying out tests and experiments, investigating human disappearances caused as Viper feeds, they reach the conclusion that Viper is attracted to the uranium-contaminated town water system, where it has a concentrated point in an abandoned uranium mine. Connors orders an electromagnetic pulse bomb, though he encounters Viper at the police station and battles and kills Steve Elkins who revealed that he deliberately programmed Viper to kill humans and in doing so, rid himself of Bream and Stanton. Along with Burnham and a former suspicious sheriff Morgan, they successfully destroy Viper with the EMP bomb at the mine and escape unharmed, with the exception of the sheriff. Back at the NASA tracking facility, Connors, Burnham and the Secretary of Defense learn that the first prototype Viper aboard the shuttle Olympus re-enters atmosphere and crashed into the Pacific Ocean.

== Cast ==
- Patrick Muldoon as Mike Connors
- Theresa Russell as Dr. Nancy Burnham
- Billy Keane as Steve Elkins
- Tim Thomerson as Sheriff Morgan
- Tamara Davies as Sid Bream
- Daniel Quinn as Alan Stanton
- Lydie Denier as Diane Cafferty, Rogue Cop's Wife
- Unknown actor as Rogue Cop
- Curtis Armstrong as Dr. Keach
- John Beck as Simpkins
- Andy Milder as Chambers
- René Rivera as Pete Gonzales
- William Langley Monroe as General Cartwright
- Adam Koster as C-133 Pilot
- Geoff Stults as Boy In Pickup
- Lorissa McComas as Girl In Pickup
- Rod McCary as Dr. Shoup
- Steve Purnick as Mr. Norton
- Eric-James Virgets as Deputy Ferguson
- Adam Gordon as Crewman Terrance
- Todd Kimsey as Crewman Mitchell
- Redmond Gleeson as Local Man
- Steve J. Hennessy as Plainclothes Agent
- Paul Preston as First NASA Suit
- Eamonn Roche as Fred, Mission Control
- James Cromwell as MP
- Joe Sabatino as MP

== Other crew members ==
- Production Designer: Robert E. Hummel
- Costume Designer: Gail De Krassel
- Casting: Linda Berger
- Visual Effects: Foundation Imaging

== Release ==
Project Viper debuted as a Sci Fi Pictures TV-movie on the Sci Fi Channel on April 20, 2002. It was also released to DVD and VHS later that year in August, with the DVD including a widescreen transfer.
