= Bianca Santos =

American actress (born 1990)

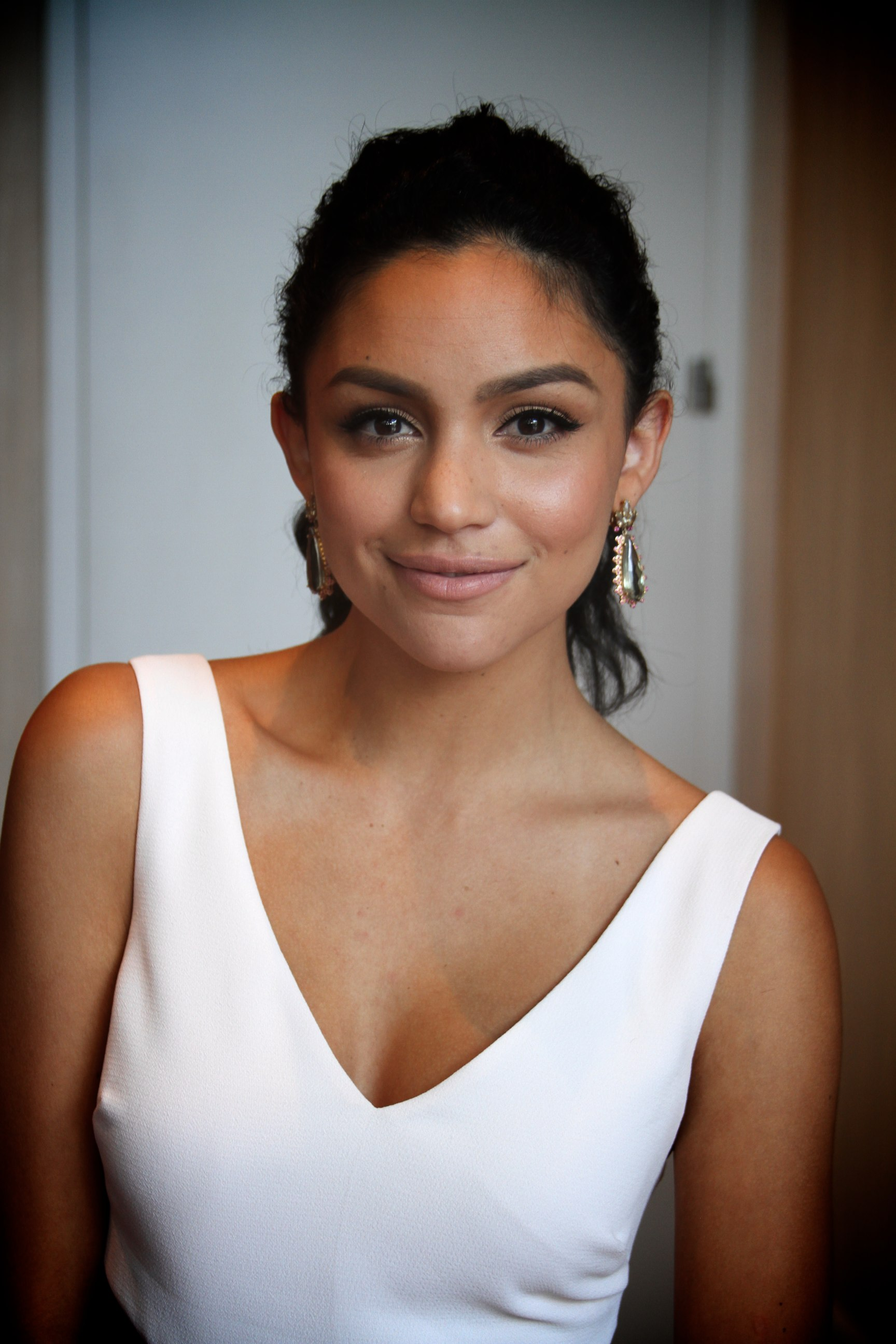
- Santos at the 2014 Imagen Awards
- Born: Bianca Alexa Santos; July 26, 1990 (age 36); Santa Monica, California, U.S.
- Occupation: Actress
- Years active: 2013–present

Bianca Alexa Santos (born July 26, 1990) is an American actress known for her roles as Lexi Rivera in the Freeform drama series The Fosters and as Lucy Velez in the MTV comedy series Happyland. She also starred in the films Ouija (2014), The DUFF (2015), and Priceless (2016).

== Early life and education ==
Santos was born on July 26, 1990, in Santa Monica, California. Her father, Carlos Santos, is Brazilian from Rio de Janeiro, and her mother, Carmen Carnot, is Cuban from Havana. Santos is fluent in Spanish and Portuguese. She attended California Lutheran University, majoring in psychology and minoring in sociology.

== Career ==
In May 2013, it was announced that Santos would join the cast of the Freeform drama series The Fosters, portraying the recurring role of Lexi Rivera. Santos subsequently co-starred as Isabelle in the 2014 horror film Ouija (2014).

Santos was also cast in the lead role of Lucy Velez in MTV's comedy series Happyland. In 2015, she portrayed the best friend of Mae Whitman's character in the teen comedy film The DUFF. She has also appeared in films Priceless (2016), SPF-18 (2017) and Avenge the Crows (2017).

== Filmography ==
=== Film ===
Year	Title	Role	Notes
2014	Ouija	Isabelle	
2015	The Duff	Casey Cordero	
2016	Little Dead Rotting Hood	Samantha / Red Rotting Hood	
2016	Priceless	Antonia	also associate producer
2016	48 Hours to Live	Olivia	
2017	SPF-18	Camilla Barnes	
2017	Avenge the Crows	Inez	
2017	The Best People	Bianca	
2023	Invitation to a Murder	Carmen Blanco	
2023	Strange Darling	Tanya	

=== Television ===
Year	Title	Role	Notes
2013	Brodowski & Company	Anna	Television film
2013	Channing	Cindy	Television film
2013–2016	The Fosters	Lexi Rivera	Recurring role (seasons 1, 3)
2014	Happyland	Lucy Velez	Main role
2015	Dream Americano	Ermenegilda	Television film
2016–2018	Keeping It 100	Bobbi	Recurring role; also executive producer
2017	Happily Never After	Victoria	Television film
2019	Cloak & Dagger	Del	Episode: "Vikingtown Sound"
2019, 2022	Legacies	Maya	Recurring role (season 2); guest role (season 4)
2019	All Rise	Olivia McLeland	Episode: "Fool for Liv"
2022	Grey's Anatomy	Kristen Clark	Recurring role (season 18)
