= BBI Films =

Film distributor in the Netherlands

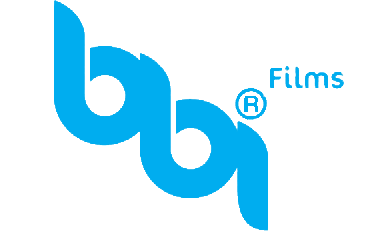

BestBuys Interactive BV, doing business as BBI Films, was an independent film distributor with 600 movie titles and documentaries to its name. The company has been active in the entertainment industry since 2002 and is located in Harderwijk, the Netherlands.

== Production ==
BBI Films acquires, distributes, and markets films, but also has been and is producing several movie titles. BBI Films produced Shade of Pale (2005), I.R.A.: King of Nothing (2006), Mexican Gangster (2008), The Bad Game (2009) and Love, Hate and Security (2014).
