= Gunnin' for That No. 1 Spot =

2008 film by Adam Yauch

Gunnin' for That #1 Spot
- Directed by: Adam Yauch
- Produced by: Adam Yauch; Jon Doran
- Starring: Jerryd Bayless; Michael Beasley; Tyreke Evans; Donté Greene; Brandon Jennings; Kevin Love; Kyle Singler; Lance Stephenson
- Edited by: Neal Usatin; Remi Gletsos; Julian Ong
- Distributed by: Oscilloscope Laboratories
- Release date: June 27, 2008
- Running time: 90 minutes
- Country: United States
- Language: English

Gunnin' for That #1 Spot is a 2008 sports documentary film directed by Adam Yauch, founding member of the Beastie Boys. The movie premiered at the Tribeca/ESPN Sports Film Festival in April 2008 and opened in theaters June 27, 2008.

== Synopsis ==
The film follows 8 of the top high school basketball players in the US at the time of filming, in 2006. The plot centers around the first annual Boost Mobile Elite 24 Hoops Classic at the legendary Rucker Park in Harlem.

By 2009, six of the eight players had joined NBA teams. None of them got the number 1 spot.

By 2011, all eight players were on NBA teams, with Kyle Singler being the last one drafted and the only one to win an NCAA Championship, which he won while playing for Duke University in 2010.

As of March 2024, only Kevin Love is still playing professional basketball in the NBA.

== Cast ==
- Jerryd Bayless - Drafted 11th overall by the Portland Trail Blazers in the 2008 NBA draft.
- Michael Beasley - Drafted 2nd overall by the Miami Heat in the 2008 NBA draft.
- Tyreke Evans - Drafted 4th overall by the Sacramento Kings in the 2009 NBA draft.
- Donté Greene - Drafted 28th overall by the Memphis Grizzlies in the 2008 NBA draft.
- Brandon Jennings - Drafted 10th overall by the Milwaukee Bucks in the 2009 NBA draft.
- Kevin Love - Drafted 5th overall by the Memphis Grizzlies in the 2008 NBA draft.
- Kyle Singler - Drafted 33rd overall by the Detroit Pistons in the 2011 NBA draft.
- Lance Stephenson - Drafted 40th overall by the Indiana Pacers in the 2010 NBA draft.

== Soundtrack ==
1. "Lucifer" by Jay-Z
2. "My First Song" by Jay-Z
3. "Dirt Off Your Shoulders" by Jay-Z
4. "Politickin'" by Beastie Boys
5. "Freaky Hijiki" by Beastie Boys
6. "Brothers on the Slide" by Cymande
7. "Running Away" by Roy Ayers
8. "Hollywood Swinging" by Kool and the Gang
9. "Cissy Strut" by The Meters
10. "Number One Spot" by Ludacris
11. "Looking for the Perfect Beat" by Afrika Bambaataa
12. "Halftime" by Nas
13. "Funky Soul" by David Batiste
14. "Amazon" by M.I.A.
15. "Pull up the People" by M.I.A.
16. "Boon Dox" by EPMD
17. "My Lifestyle" by Fat Joe
18. "Beasley is a Beastie" by Beastie Boys
19. "LTD" by Beastie Boys
20. "The Panda Rat" by Beastie Boys
21. "Hate it or Love it" by The Game
22. "Jump Around" by House of Pain
23. "Straight Outta Compton" (extended mix) by N.W.A
24. "By the Time I get to Arizona" by Public Enemy
25. "Rock the Mic" by Beanie Sigel & Freeway
26. "Root Down & Get it" by Jimmy Smith
27. "Let's do it Again" by The Staple Singers
28. "Pump it Up" by Joe Budden
29. "Friday the 13th" from the Friday the 13th series

== Reception ==
On the review aggregator website Rotten Tomatoes, 72% of 43 critics' reviews are positive.

== See also ==
- List of basketball films
