= Rogue Arts =

Film production company based in the United States

- Industry: Film
- Founded: 2003
- Founder: Kirk Harris
- Headquarters: South Bay, Los Angeles, CA, United States
- Key people: Kirk Harris, Don Franken, Vernon Mortensen, Marty Poole
- Products: Motion pictures
- Website: RogueArts.com FairwayFilmAlliance.com

Rogue Arts is a film production company founded in 2003 and is based in Los Angeles, California.

The company has produced 10 feature films and distributed over 60 titles from acclaimed international and American actors and directors such as Wim Wenders, Anders Thomas Jensen, Martin Sheen, John Malkovich, Benicio Del Toro, Mads Mikkelsen, Blythe Danner, Kirk Harris, Peter Falk, Ulrich Thomsen, Lyle Lovett, Rutger Hauer, Irina Bjorklund and Michael Rymer. The sister company to Fairway Film Alliance, a world film sales and distribution company.

== Notable film releases ==
- Three Days of Rain (2004) - by Michael Meredith, presented by Wim Wenders
- Flickering Lights (2002) - by Anders Thomas Jensen
- Lola (2002) - by Carl Bessai
- Allie & Me (1998) - by Michael Rymer

== Films produced ==
- Army Dog (2015) - by Ezra Kemp
- The Sorrow (2012) - by Vernon Mortensen
- The Kid: Chamaco (2010) - by Miguel Necoechea
