= Western Film Exchange =

Western Film Exchange was founded in Milwaukee in July 1906 by John R. Freuler and Harry E. Aitken for the purpose of mass-producing and distributing Western films to movie theaters throughout the American midwest. One of over 100 such "exchanges," Western Film proved to be more successful than most, opening branch offices in several midwestern cities, including Chicago, St. Louis, and Joplin, Missouri. Exchanges would negotiate with film studios for the rights to a completed film production, and would distribute the product to nickelodeon movie theaters.

This business model came to an end in 1908 when the Motion Picture Patents Company (MPPC; commonly known as the Edison Trust) sued independent film studios on grounds of patent infringement. Most studios did not have the means to stand against the Trust and were forced out of operation. With fewer films being produced, Freuler and Aitken were soon faced with financial difficulties. In order to keep Western Film afloat, they formed a succession of independent studios expressly for the purpose of keeping Western Film supplied with new pictures. The first of these studios was the American Film Manufacturing Company, founded in 1910, which was soon joined by Majestic Film. Both Western Film and its various affiliated studios were targeted by the MPPC to little avail: so successful were Freuler and Aitken's ventures that, in 1912, they partnered with the Shallenberger brothers (Wilbert E. and William Edgar), Crawford Livingston, and Charles J. Hite to found a new company, Mutual Film Corporation, which eventually came to replace the Western Film Exchange.
