= The Kid: Chamaco =

- Film poster
- Directed by: Miguel Necoechea
- Written by: Carl Bessai; Kirk Harris; Miguel Necoechea
- Produced by: Don Franken; Kirk Harris; Miguel Necoechea Jr.
- Starring: Martin Sheen; Michael Madsen
- Cinematography: Guillermo Granillo
- Edited by: Mario Sandoval
- Music by: Sean Drew
- Distributed by: Maya Entertainment
- Release date: 8 October 2009 (Morelia)
- Running time: 97 minutes
- Country: Mexico
- Languages: Spanish; English

The Kid: Chamaco is a 2009 Mexican drama film directed by Miguel Necoechea and starring Martin Sheen and Michael Madsen. It is Necoechea's directorial debut.

== Cast ==
- Martin Sheen as Dr. Frank Irwin
- Kirk Harris as Jimmy "The Dream" Irwin
- Álex Perea as Abner Torres
- Michael Madsen as Willie
- Danny Perea as Silvana Torres
- Gustavo Sánchez Parra as Rigoberto Torres
- Raúl Méndez as Officer Manuel Quintana
- Sofía Espinosa as Paulina
- Marco Antonio Barrera as himself

== Production ==
The film was shot in Mexico City for five weeks.
