= San Diego International Jewish Film Festival =

Annual film festival

Coordinates: 32°52′33.5″N 117°13′3.5″W

The San Diego International Jewish Film Festival (SDIJFF) is an annual film festival held in San Diego, California. Established in 1990, the festival is managed by the San Diego Center for Jewish Culture, at the Lawrence Family Jewish Community Center in La Jolla. The festival usually consists of around fifty narrative, documentary, and short films, often with post-film audience discussions with the filmmakers. The festival also includes special events such as receptions and religious observances such as havdalah. Awards include the Audience Choice Award for Best Documentary and Feature; and Audience Choice for Best Short by an Emerging Filmmaker in the "Joyce Forum" program.

== See also ==
- San Francisco Jewish Film Festival
- Tampa Bay Jewish Film Festival
