= Army Dog =

2016 American family adventure film

- Directed by: Ezra Kemp
- Written by: Kirk Harris; Adrienne Thorne; Vernon E. Mortensen
- Produced by: Marty Poole; Casper Van Dien; Vernon E. Mortensen; Tonya Mantooth; Kirk Harris
- Starring: Casper Van Dien; Grace Van Dien; Stelio Savante
- Cinematography: Ace Underhill
- Edited by: John Niewiadomy
- Distributed by: Lionsgate Home Entertainment
- Release date: January 12, 2016
- Running time: 90 minutes
- Country: United States
- Language: English

Army Dog (also released under the title Leap) is a 2016 American family adventure film directed by Ezra Kemp and distributed by Lionsgate Home Entertainment. It stars Casper Van Dien, his daughter Grace Van Dien, and Stelio Savante.

== Synopsis ==
Sergeant Tom Holloway (Casper Van Dien) returns home from service with his loyal Army dog, Connor. Hoping to reconnect with his daughter Tara (Grace Van Dien), he takes her and Connor on a camping trip. Their time together is disrupted by unexpected dangers, forcing father and daughter to work together with Connor in order to survive.

== Cast ==
- Casper Van Dien as Tom Holloway
- Grace Van Dien as Tara Holloway
- Stelio Savante as Sheriff Bill McCallister
- Annemarie Pazmino as Laurie Holloway
- Matt Bradford as Coach Jerry Bronson
- Michael King as Captain Harris
- Craig R. Sawyer as Master Sergeant Johnny Slade

== Reception ==
Common Sense Media rated the film two stars, describing it as a "predictable father-daughter tale [with] solid messages." Rotten Tomatoes summarizes the film similarly, noting its emphasis on family themes and father–daughter bonding.

On Rotten Tomatoes, Army Dog holds a 32% Tomatometer score, reflecting mixed critical responses, and includes a concise synopsis of the storyline. DVDTalk praised the performances, particularly the real-life father-daughter dynamic, noting that "the best is done with the resources available."
