= Patrick Muldoon =

American actor, film producer and musician (1968–2026)

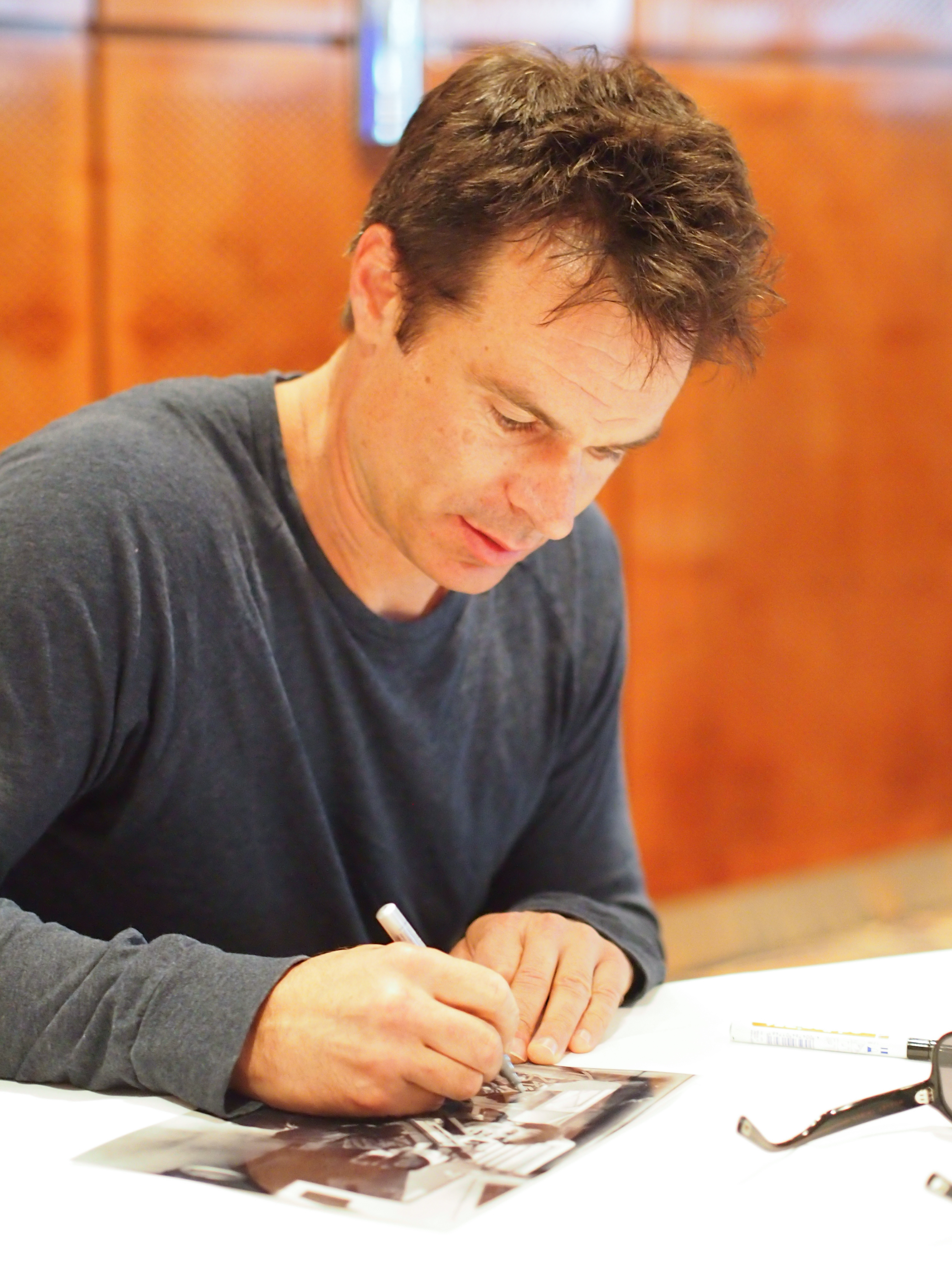
- Muldoon in 2013
- Born: William Patrick Muldoon III; September 27, 1968; San Pedro, California, U.S
- Died: April 19, 2026 (aged 57); Beverly Hills, California, U.S.
- Occupations: Actor; film producer; musician
- Years active: 1990–2026

William Patrick Muldoon III (September 27, 1968 – April 19, 2026) was an American actor, film producer, and musician. He was best known for his roles as Austin Reed on Days of Our Lives and Zander Barcalow on Starship Troopers.

== Early life and education ==
Muldoon was born in San Pedro, California, on September 27, 1968, the son of William Patrick Muldoon II, a personal injury lawyer, and Deanna Muldoon (née Petrov), a homemaker. He was of Irish descent on his father's side and of Croatian descent on his mother's side. He attended Loyola High School, a Jesuit school. Muldoon graduated in 1991 from the University of Southern California, where he was a member of the Sigma Chi fraternity and played tight end on the USC Trojans football team.

== Career ==
Muldoon was the first actor to play the role of Austin Reed on Days of Our Lives, from 1992 to 1995 and again from September 2011 to July 2012. Prior to that in 1991, he landed a role on the popular teen television series Saved by the Bell.

During the 1990s, Muldoon became the only actor ever to hold an exclusive development deal with Spelling Entertainment. Muldoon co-produced programming with Spelling Television's vice president Tony Shepherd, and their television development began with the USA Petite Model Show created by actress-model Ann Lauren. The show was filmed on-location at Caesars Palace on the renowned Colosseum Circus Maximus Showroom stage, in The Forum Shops and sponsored by Cartier. The televised special was co-hosted by Muldoon and Lauren with special guest co-star Audrey Landers of Dallas and broadcast on WWOR and WGN Superstations distributed by Spelling Television Worldvision.

Muldoon's roles included playing the popular villain Richard Hart on the primetime soap opera Melrose Place from 1995 to 1996. Muldoon played Zander Barcalow in the 1997 Paul Verhoeven-directed film Starship Troopers. In 1998, he starred in the television film Black Cat Run, directed by D. J. Caruso. He also starred in several films for the Lifetime and Hallmark channels. On stage, Muldoon played Edmund in Patsy Rodenburg's 2006 production of King Lear.

In 2015, Muldoon produced and starred in Badge of Honor. In 2020, he appeared in the films Arkansas and The Comeback Trail.

== Death ==
Muldoon died at his home in Beverly Hills from a heart attack on April 19, 2026, at the age of 57.

== Filmography ==
=== Film ===
Year	Title	Role	Notes
1993	Rage and Honor II	Tommy Andrews	
1997	Starship Troopers	Zander Barcalow	
1998	Arrival II	Jack Addison	Direct-to-video
1998	Wicked	Lawson Smith	
1999	Stigmata	Steven	
1999	Red Team	Jason Chandler	
2001	Bad Karma	Trey Campbell	
2001	Blackwoods	Matt Sullivan	
2002	Whacked!	Mark Steward	
2002	Heart of America	Ryan Kirkland	
2006	Miracle Dogs Too	Jeff	Direct-to-video
2006	Military Intelligence and You!	Nick Reed	
2008	Christmas Town	Kevin	Direct-to-video
2008	Broken Angel	Kevin	
2008	Japan	Taxi Driver	
2009	Noah's Ark: The New Beginning	Shem	Voice; direct-to-video
2009	The Chaos Experiment	Christopher	
2010	Repo	Jeffery Maiser	
2010	The 7 Adventures of Sinbad	Sinbad	Direct-to-video
2011	Last Will	Joseph Emery	
2011	Born to Ride		
2013	Spiders 3D	Jason Cole	
2014	The Dog Who Saved Easter	Fred Stein	Direct-to-video
2015	The Dog Who Saved Summer	Fred Stein	Direct-to-video
2015	A Horse Tale	Michael	Direct-to-video
2015	Robo-Dog	Tom Austin	Direct-to-video
2016	Little Dead Rotting Hood	Henry	
2017	American Satan	SS Singer	
2017	Saving Christmas	Sammy	Direct-to-video
2017	The Tribes of Palos Verdes	—N/a	Executive producer
2018	A Dog & Pony Show	Rusty Wiggins	
2018	Runnin' from My Roots	Seth Ingram	
2018	Bernie the Dolphin	Bob Ryan	
2019	My Adventures with Santa	Josh Nolan	
2019	Bernie the Dolphin 2	Bob Ryan	
2020	Arkansas	Joe	Also executive producer
2020	The Comeback Trail	Frank Pierce	
2020	Timecrafters: The Treasure of Pirate's Cove	Mr. Dare	
2021	Vanquish	Agent Monroe	
2021	Deadlock	Mack Karr	
2021	The Card Counter	—N/a	Executive producer
2022	Marlowe	Richard Cavendish	Also executive producer
2023	The Quest for Tom Sawyer's Gold	AJ Harrison	
2024	Murder at Hollow Creek	Thomas Bennett	
2024	Riff Raff	—N/a	Executive producer
2026	The Dreadful	—N/a	Executive producer
2026	Dirty Hands	Richie Denton	Posthumous release
TBA	Stay at Home	David	Post-production, posthumous release
TBA	Pray for Me: Key to Freedom	Senator	Post-production, posthumous release
TBA	Kockroach	—N/a	Executive producer, posthumous release

=== Television ===
Year	Title	Role	Notes
1990	Who's the Boss?	Matt	2 episodes
1991	Saved by the Bell	Jeffrey Hunter	3 episodes
1992	Silk Stalkings	Charles Lantman	Episode: "Good Time Charlie"
1992–1995, 2011–2012	Days of Our Lives	Austin Reed	Returned to role in September 2011 after a 16-year hiatus
1993	Night Sins	Austin Reed	Television film
1994	Winter Heat	Austin Reed	Television film
1995–1996	Melrose Place	Richard Hart	Recurring role
1996	Deadly Pursuits	Tim Faulkner	Television film
1998	Black Cat Run	Johnny Del Grissom	Television film
2000	Final Ascent	Viggo	Television film
2000	Chain of Command	Michael Connelly	Television film
2002	Project Viper	Mike Connors	Television film
2004	A Boyfriend for Christmas	Ryan Hughes	Television film
2007	Point of Entry	Caleb Theroux	Television film
2007	Ice Spiders	"Dash" Dashiell	Television film
2010	Turbulent Skies	Charles Devain	Television film
2012	All About Christmas Eve	Tino Accosta	Television film
2013	Holiday Road Trip	Patrick	Television film
2013	The Haunting of...	Himself	Documentary series; episode: "Patrick Muldoon"
2014	Christmas in Palm Springs	Joe Brady	Television film
2014	Fatal Acquittal	Scott	Television film
2014	Deadly Revenge	Jack	Television film
2014	Finders Keepers	Jonathan Simon	Television film
2015	Patient Killer	Derek	Television film
2015	A Christmas Reunion	Jack	Television film
2016	His Secret Past	Charles	Television film
2016	My Best Friend	Allen	Television film
2017	Boyfriend Killer	Charles Durro	Television film
2018	A Tale of Two Coreys	Bob Feldman	Television film
2025	Double Scoop	Everett	

=== Music videos ===
Year	Artist	Song	Role
2013	Daughtry	"Waiting for Superman"	Suicidal Man

- Muldoon was the lead singer of the band The Sleeping Masses, their song "The Woman is the Way" was chosen for the 2009 movie Powder Blue end credits and features film clips in the video. The song was also featured on the show The Hills. The music video was filmed in Berkshire, England and produced by British director Leon Mitchell.
