= Crown Firecoach =

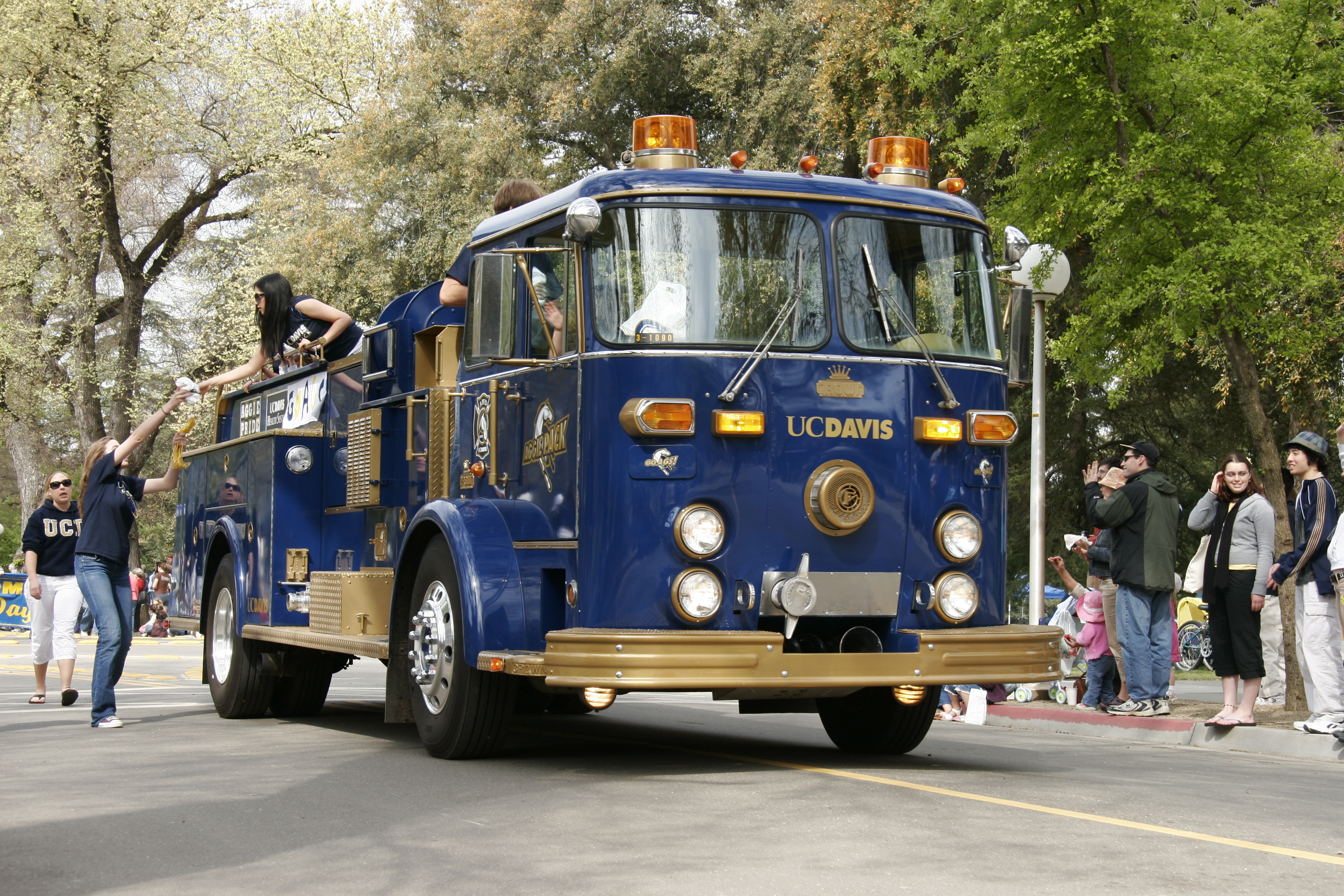
- Retired Crown Firecoach in use as a parade vehicle by the UC Davis Aggies

Overview
- Type: Fire truck
- Manufacturer: Crown Coach Corporation
- Production: 1951–1985
- Assembly: Los Angeles, California
- Designer: Roy Hardy (1951)

Body and chassis
- Layout: Mid-engine, rear-wheel drive (4x2)
- Related: Crown Supercoach

Crown Firecoach is a nameplate used for various types of firefighting apparatus manufactured and marketed by Crown Coach Corporation in Los Angeles, California, from 1951 to 1985. Although sold primarily in the West Coast region of the United States (California, Oregon, Washington, Idaho, Arizona, and Nevada), other examples of the Firecoach were sold to fire departments in Hawaii, Illinois, and New Jersey, as well as in Mexico and Kuwait.

Using the mid-engine chassis of the Crown Supercoach school bus as a basis, the Firecoach was produced in several configurations for fire departments. In addition, Crown Coach served as a second-stage manufacturer, producing fire apparatus bodies for a variety of customer-supplied chassis upon request.

Shortly after the sale of Crown Coach in 1979, the Firecoach line was discontinued in favor of bus manufacturing. In 1991, Crown ended operations altogether.

== Background ==
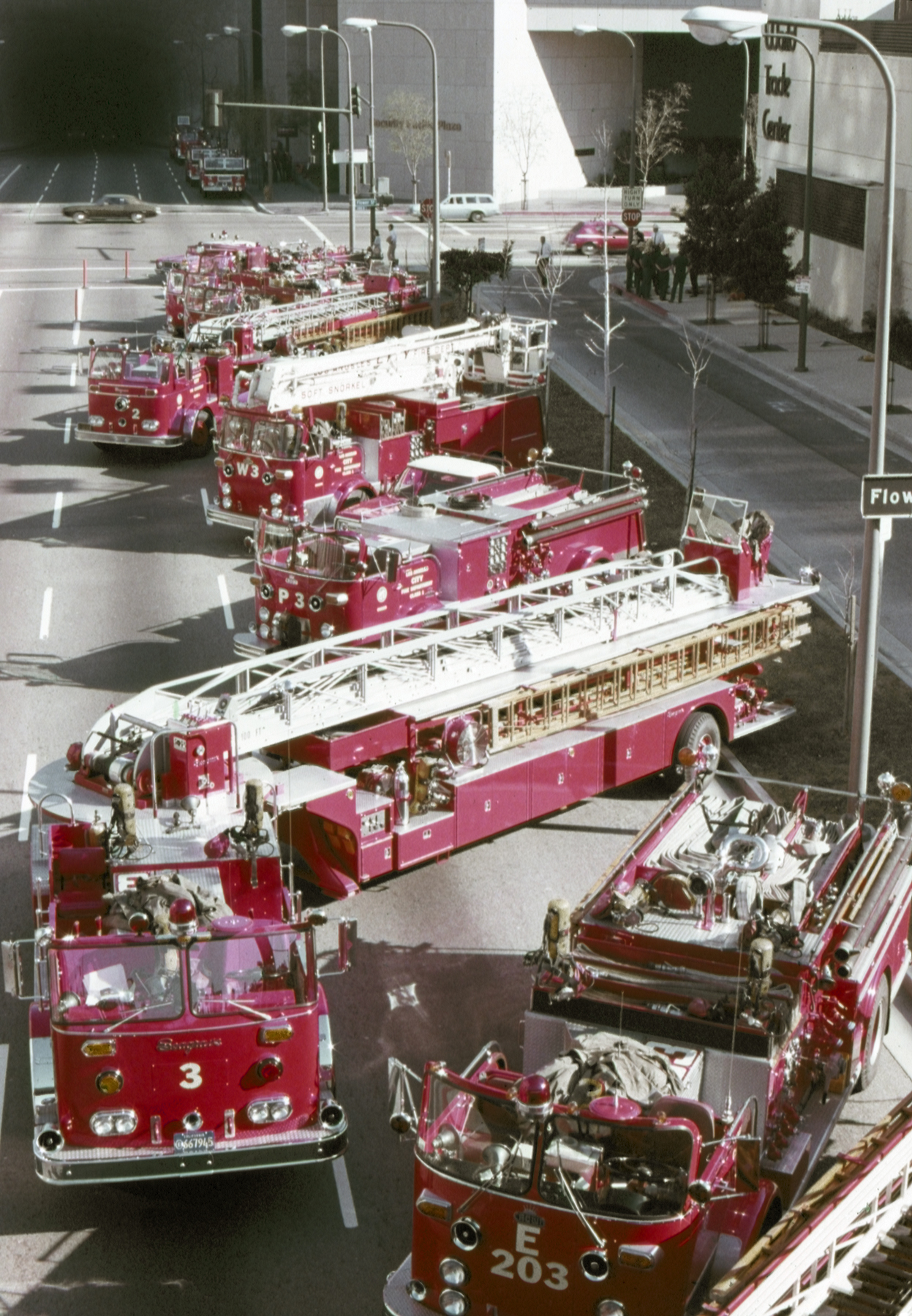
1977 photograph of a group of Crown Firecoaches (#3 is a Seagrave tiller)

The production of fire apparatus by Crown Coach can be traced back to World War II. As was the case with other vehicle manufacturers, all production was diverted towards the armed forces following the outbreak of the war. In the case of Crown Coach, the company was asked to produce fire engine bodies for a chassis produced by Ford/Marmon-Herrington. In the postwar era, though Crown Coach concentrated its resources on updating its bus products (on what would become the 1949 Crown Supercoach school bus), the company built a few more chassis-based fire engines in the late 1940s.

In 1949, Crown engineer Roy Hardy (a former Mack executive) commenced work on a dedicated design for a company-produced fire engine. The Crown fire engine would compete with the recently introduced American LaFrance 700 cab-forward fire engine, but built to Crown Coach standards and quality. A key part of the design behind the new fire engine was adapting the chassis and front bodywork of the mid-engine Supercoach school bus for the vehicle.

With the blessing of company president M.M. Brockway, construction of the first prototype was completed in 1951. Taking on the name "Crown Firecoach" in relation to its configuration and its relation to the Supercoach bus, the Firecoach would remain a demonstration vehicle for two years, as Crown both completed its development and marketed it to potential customers.

In 1965, following an increase in school bus production, Firecoach production was split into its own division within the company.

== Design overview ==
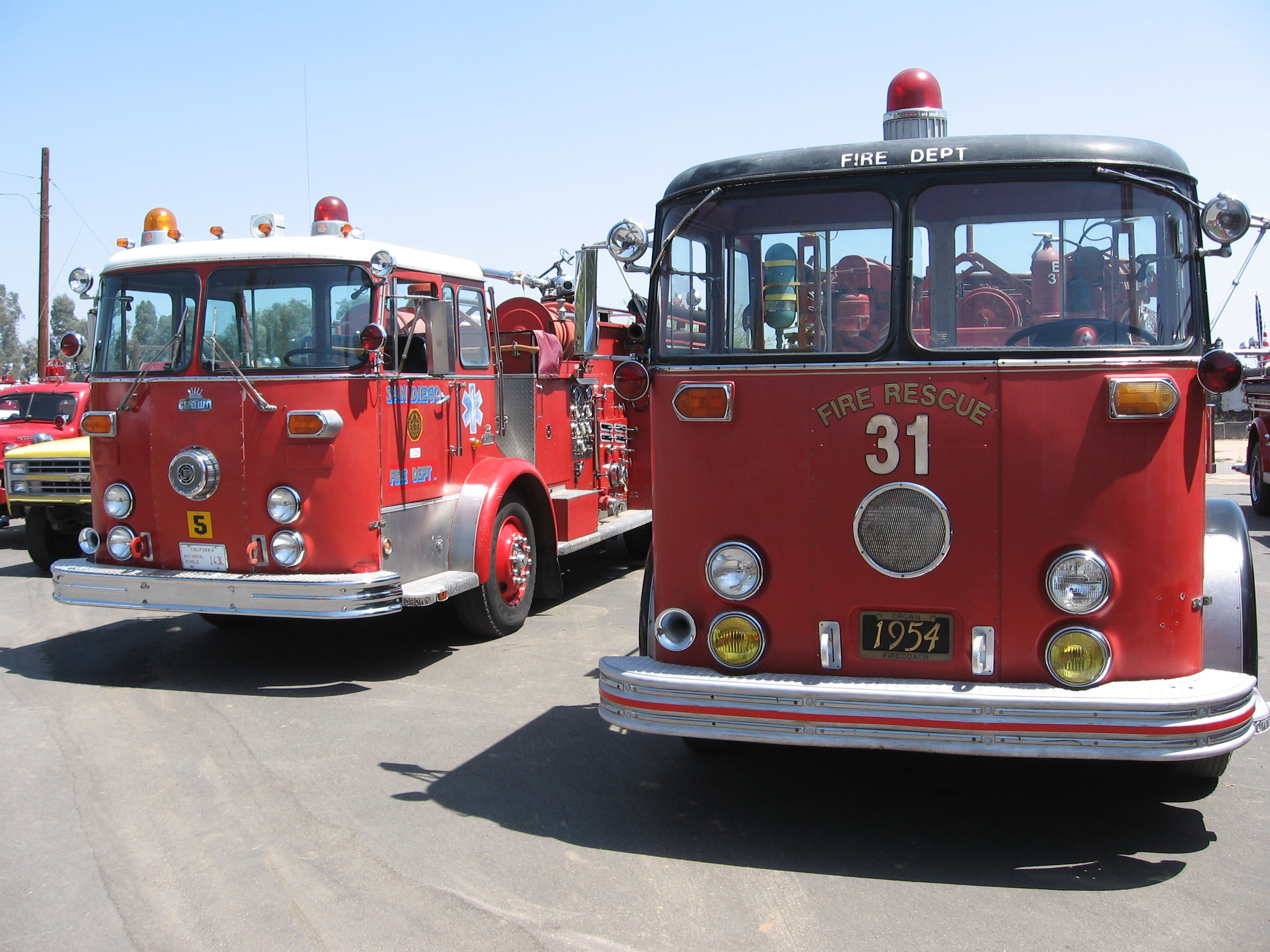
Retired Crown Firecoach #1328 of San Diego Fire Department (left) and 1954 Crown Firecoach No. 31 (unknown operator)

A retired Crown Firecoach of The Dalles, Oregon

As with its Supercoach counterpart, the Firecoach saw only gradual changes during its production run. Built largely to order for individual fire departments, the firm produced the Firecoach in a variety of different types and configurations, including pumpers, tillers, aerial trucks, and tender trucks.

=== Mechanical layout ===
While nearly all Firecoaches were two-axle configurations, several "tractor" units were built to tow aerial devices and for various specialty uses. Derived from the Crown Supercoach product line, the cab-forward Firecoach was of a mid-engine layout.

Although equipped with Hall-Scott gasoline engines like the Supercoach, the Firecoach was equipped with much larger versions (935 and 1091 cubic inches vs. 590). In 1958, to improve braking ability, Firecoaches (alongside all other Crown Coach vehicles) were equipped with 10-inch wide brake drums. For 1963, an automatic transmission became an option. The first diesel-engine Firecoach was assembled in 1964 (a decade after its introduction in Crown buses).

=== Cab design ===
In 1954, Crown Coach produced its first Firecoach with an enclosed cab; a 4-door cab made its debut in 1963. Although an enclosed cab had been introduced as an option, into the mid-1960s, the majority of Crown Firecoaches were constructed with open-air cabs. Following the Watts riots of 1965, in order to provide better security for firefighters, Crown Coach introduced a compartment roof design for its open-air cabs; the design became retrofitted to many in-service Firecoaches as well.

During the 1970s, fully enclosed cabs grew in popularity. In 1977, Crown Coach made the first major change to the Firecoach cab with the introduction of a "wide-cab" configuration; sold alongside its predecessor, the wide-cab Firecoach became standard in 1979.

=== Configurations ===
When first designed in 1951, the Firecoach was initially configured as a 2-axle pumper. During its production run, the Firecoach would be introduced in a variety of other configurations for customer requests. In 1955, the first water tender Firecoach was introduced. In 1956, a Firecoach was introduced as a tiller truck; the Firecoach chassis was a tractor towing an American LaFrance aerial device.

In 1961, aerial devices saw a change as Crown introduced its first Firecoach snorkel truck (bucket lift). In 1966, Crown produces its first company-produced tiller-based aerial device, though a 2-axle ladder truck made its debut the same year. In 1969, the first quint version of the Firecoach made its debut as Crown introduced the Firecoach TeleSquirt.

Type	Introduction	Cab	Vertical Reach	Other notes
Aerial	1956	2-door open-air 2-door enclosed 4-door enclosed 2-door wide-body enclosed	100'	Mid mount ladder or rear mount ladder Available as 2-axle tiller truck
Pumper Water Tender	1951	2-door open-air 2-door enclosed 4-door enclosed 2-door wide-body enclosed		
Snorkel truck	1961	2-door open-air 2-door enclosed 4-door enclosed 2-door wide-body enclosed	50' 65' 75' 85'	First Crown snorkel truck is an International Harvester COE chassis.
TeleSquirt	1969	2-door open-air 2-door enclosed 4-door enclosed 2-door wide-body enclosed	54' 55' 75'	

== Discontinuation ==
During the late 1970s, sales of the Crown Firecoach began to decline as the design began to age. Following the sale of Crown Coach in 1979, sales largely collapsed, leading to an initial discontinuation of the line in 1982. In 1984, production resumed of cab and chassis vehicles; the bodywork was completed in partnership with a California fire engine manufacturer. In 1985, the final Crown Firecoach chassis was produced, closing a 34-year production run.

== Variants ==
=== Chassis-based apparatus ===
Crown Coach produced the Firecoach in a variety of different types and configurations, including pumpers, tillers, aerial trucks, and tender trucks. In addition to the fire engines based on its Supercoach bus line, Crown also assembled fire engines on truck chassis (by customer request).

During the production of the Firecoach, Crown bodied the following truck chassis:

- Chevrolet C30
- Ford C850 (Ford F-Series COE)
- Ford C700 (Ford C-Series)
- Pierce-Crown
- VanPelt-Crown (1984–1985)

Crown Coach also built custom-designed fire vehicles from Supercoach and Firecoach chassis:

- 1957: 4 fire engines for Kuwait produced with stainless steel water tanks (to use ocean water in pumping).
- 1958: 28-foot crew bus for Los Angeles County Fire Department
- 1960: Bulldozer transport using Firecoach tractor for Los Angeles City Fire Department
- 1965: Two open-cab rescue trucks using Firecoach chassis for Honolulu, Hawaii Fire Department
- 1967: Heavy Utility tow truck using Firecoach chassis for Los Angeles Fire Department
- 1971: Mobile hospital/ambulance for Walter Reed Army Hospital in Washington DC (using Supercoach body)
- 1975: 2-axle trailer water tank/50-foot TeleSqurt for Tulare, California Fire Department

== In popular culture ==
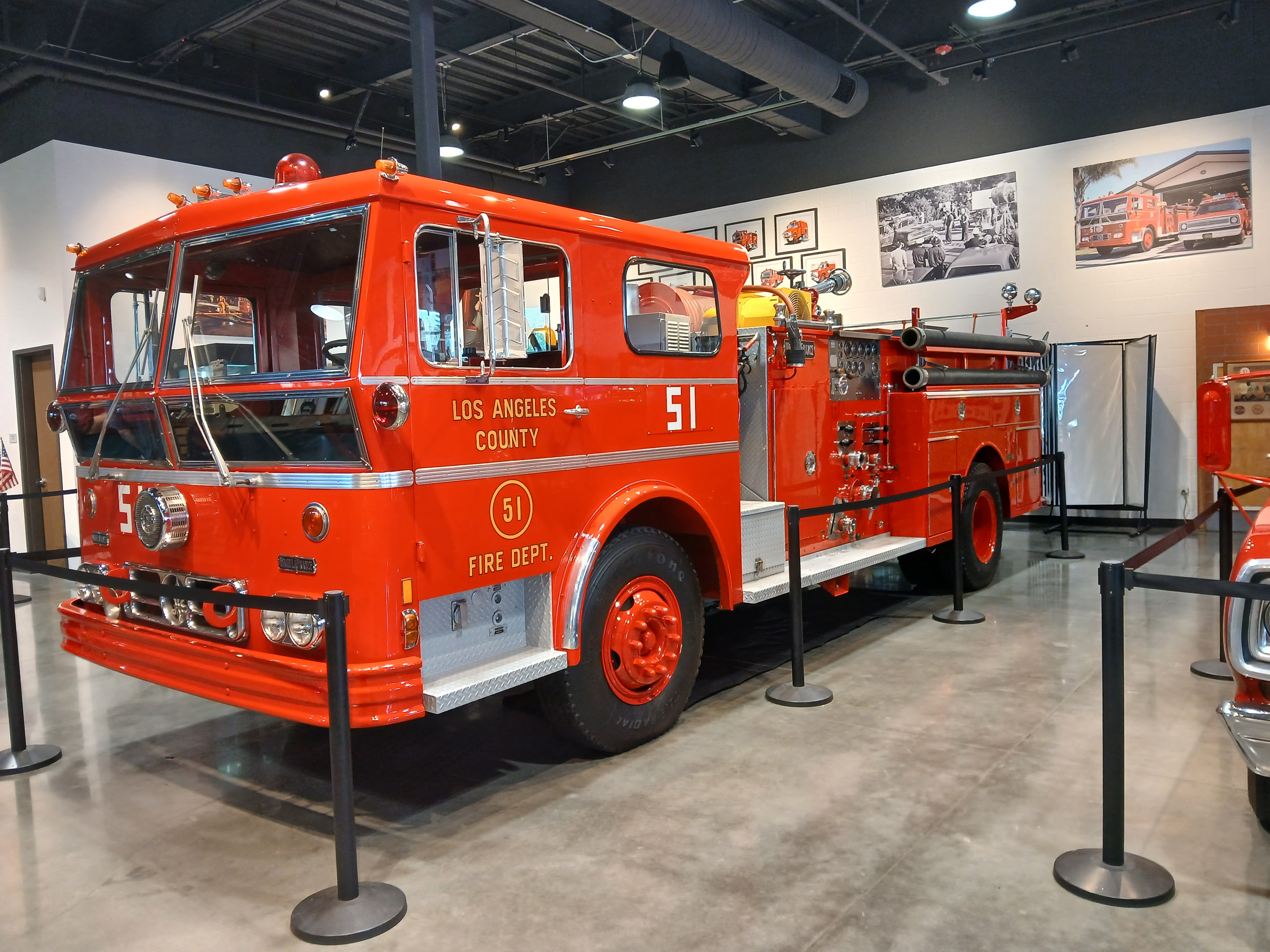
The Ward LaFrance in 2025 at Los Angeles County Fire Museum

During the first two seasons of the 1972-1977 NBC/Universal television series Emergency!, multiple Firecoaches of the Los Angeles County Fire Department (LACoFD) served as media props while in active service. On the television show, Engine 51 was portrayed by two different 1965 Firecoach Triple engines. Engine 60 (the fire engine stationed on the Universal set) was used for scenes filmed on the set; Engine 127 was used for scenes where location filming was completed.

In 1973, LACoFD purchased a large number of Ward LaFrance P-80 Ambassador pumpers; the company donated an additional P-80 unit to Universal to serve as Engine 51, ending the need to take active fire engines out of service periodically for filming. While Engine #127 was destroyed in a later traffic accident, Engine #60 returned to its permanent assignment on the Universal set until its retirement in 1987.

The two versions of Engine 51, the 1965 Crown Firecoach (assigned as Engine #60; the final open-cab fire engine of Los Angeles) and the 1973 Ward LaFrance (donated to Universal for filming use) are now owned by the County of Los Angeles Fire Museum Association and have been fully restored.
