= Engine 51 =

Fire truck used in the Emergency! TV series

- Emergency! vehicle
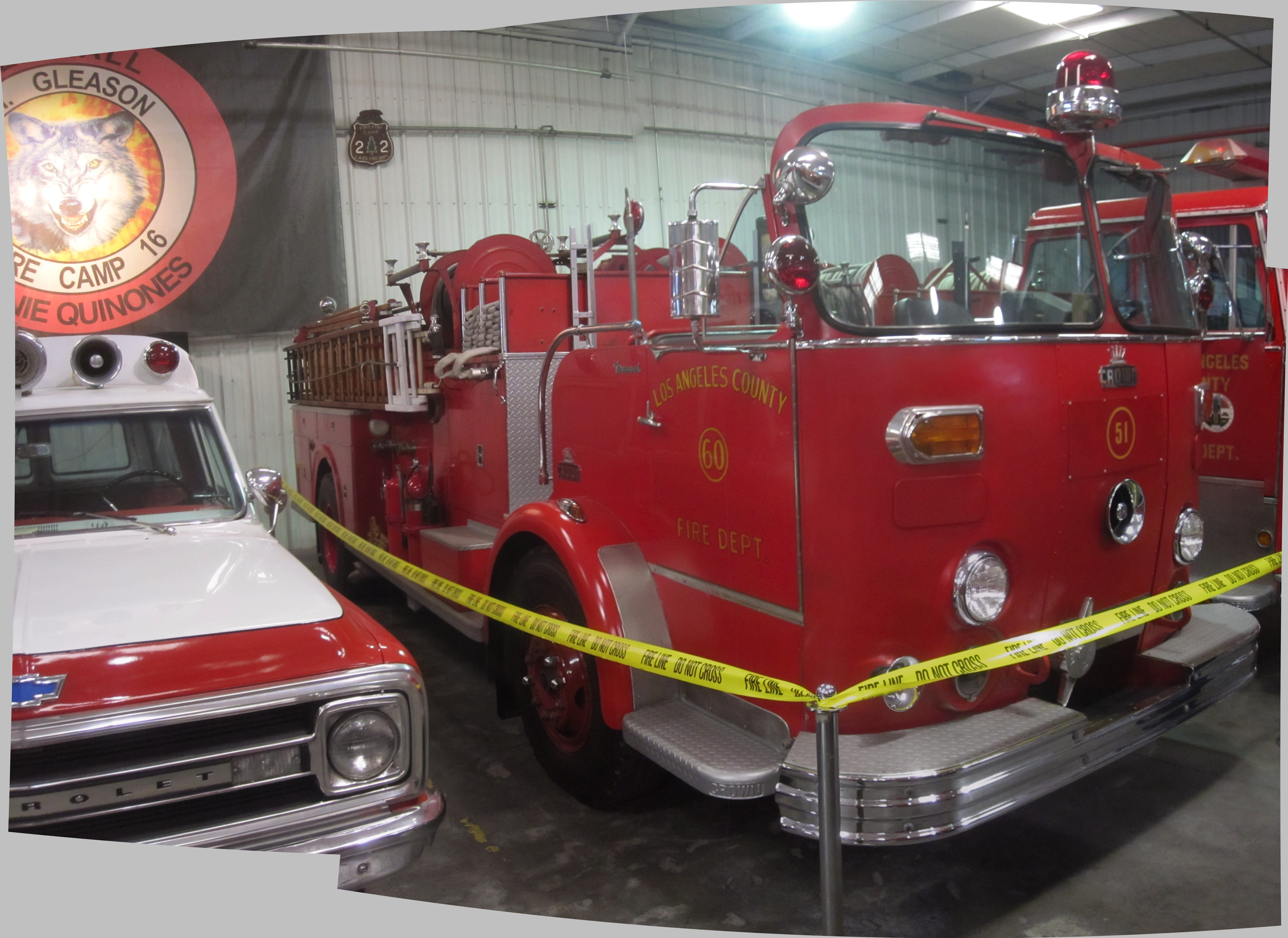
- The 1965 Crown Coach used as Engine 51 in the Los Angeles County Fire Museum
- First appearance: Emergency!; 1972
- Last appearance: 1978

Information
- Affiliation: Los Angeles County Fire Department

General characteristics
- Class: Triple combination pumper (fire engine)
- Propulsion: Gasoline engine (1965 Crown Firecoach); Diesel engine (1973 Ward LaFrance)

Engine 51 is a fire engine known for its time in the 1970s American television show Emergency!. Engine 51 was represented in the television show by two very different fire engines. Both Engines 51s are now displayed in the Los Angeles County Fire Museum in Bellflower, California, next to Squad 51 from the same show.

== Crown Coach E51 ==
The first apparatus used as Engine 51 for Emergency! was a 1965 Crown Firecoach Triple. It has a pump producing 1,250 gallons per minute, a 935 cubic inch Hall-Scott gasoline engine producing 195 or 215 horsepower.

The first "Engine 51" was an actual Los Angeles County Fire Department (LACoFD) engine assigned to Fire Station 60 on the lot of Universal Studios. LA County Engine 60 was LACoFD's last open-cab fire engine. It was in service at Universal Studios from 1965 to about 1987 when it was placed in the care of the Los Angeles County Fire Museum in Bellflower, California, where it resides today. Showing only 20,000 miles on the odometer, it is the lowest-mileage fire apparatus on the LACoFD. In original condition, the museum plans to only touch up the paint where needed and maintain this Crown in as original condition as possible.

For the first two seasons, when filming on the Universal Studio lot, this is the engine that was used, as it was readily available. Engine 60 became Engine 51 by putting magnets or stickers over the numbers 60 on the doors and the front. A sister fire engine, Engine 127 from Station 127 in Carson, California, was used when filming off the lot, at the refinery, or at the old fire station. This engine was involved in a traffic accident and destroyed, leaving engine 60 as the only original Engine 51.

== Ward LaFrance E51 ==
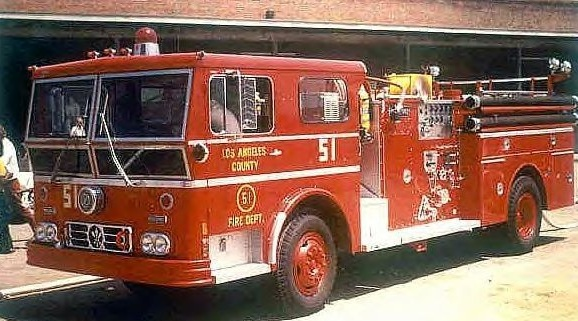
The Ward LaFrance in a photo shot in the 1970s

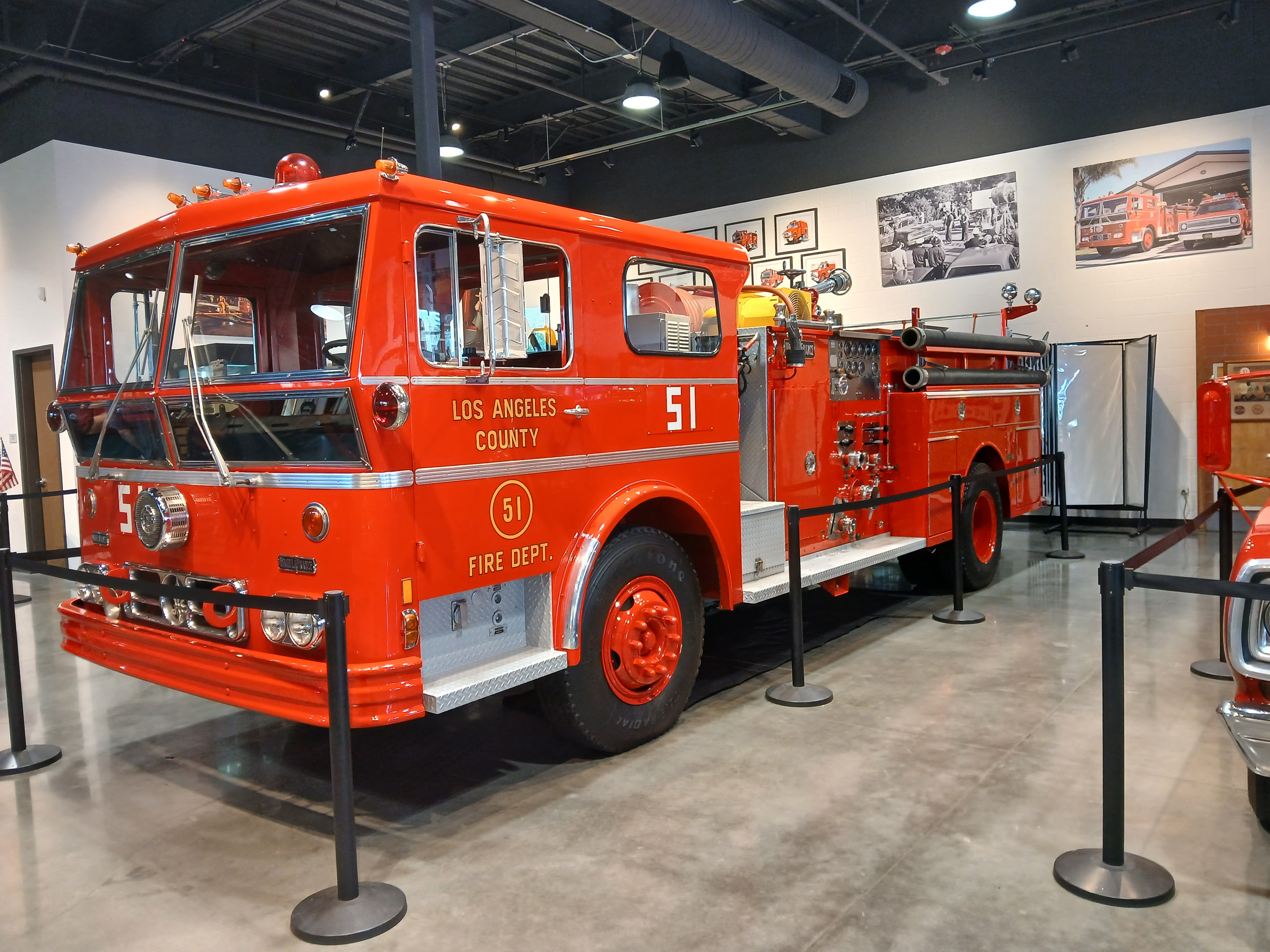
The Ward LaFrance in 2025

The second Engine 51 is a 1973 Ward LaFrance 1000 gpm triple combination P-80 Ambassador model powered by a Cummins NH855 250 hp naturally aspirated diesel engine driving through an Allison HT-70 power-shift transmission. The LACoFD rigs were 1250 gpm triples powered by Cummins NHCT295 turbocharged Diesels driving through Allison HT-70 5 speed manual transmissions. They had 500-gallon booster tanks, as did Engine 51. In their outward appearance both E-51 and the LACoFD rigs were identical. All the County Ward rigs plus E-51 had Federal Q2B sirens and Grover Stutter-tone air horns.

Because the engine did not meet LACoFD specs, the county would not accept the truck as a donation. After a couple more cameo appearances, Universal's parent company, MCA, transferred the engine to Yosemite National Park, where it had the concession contract. That contract required them to have a fire department. The engine was transferred to the new concession company when MCA's contract ended. This Engine 51 was retrieved by the County of Los Angeles Fire Museum on August 8, 2008, from the national park, having been in service there since the 1980s.

In 2010, The County of Los Angeles Fire Museum started to restore the Ward back to its 1970s appearance, and equip it fully, as when it starred as Engine 51. The restoration was finished in 2012.
