= Flathead motorcycles =

Type of motorcycle

Flathead motorcycles are a type of bike that was a standard for pre-war motorcycles, in particular US V-twins such as Harley-Davidson and Indian, some British singles, BMW flat twins and Russian copies thereof.

Flathead motorcycles have side-valves contained within the engine block, instead of in the cylinder head, as in an overhead valve engine. This early engine design has mostly fallen into disuse.

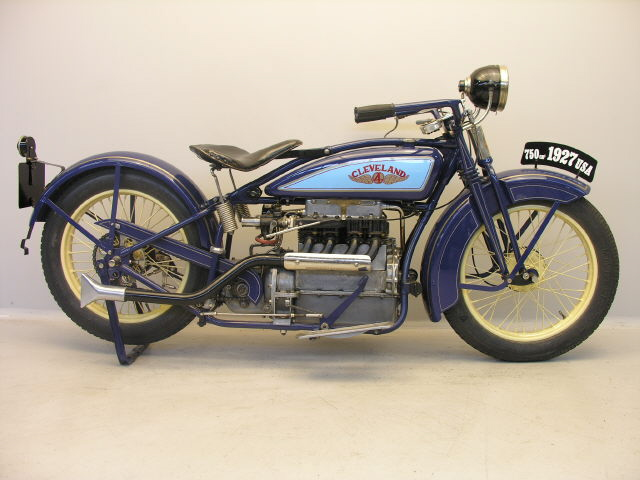
Cleveland Model 4-45

In 1925 Cleveland Motorcycle Manufacturing Company released a motorcycle with a 36.5 cubic inches (598 cc) T-head four-cylinder engine designed by L. E. Fowler.

== Harley-Davidson flatheads ==
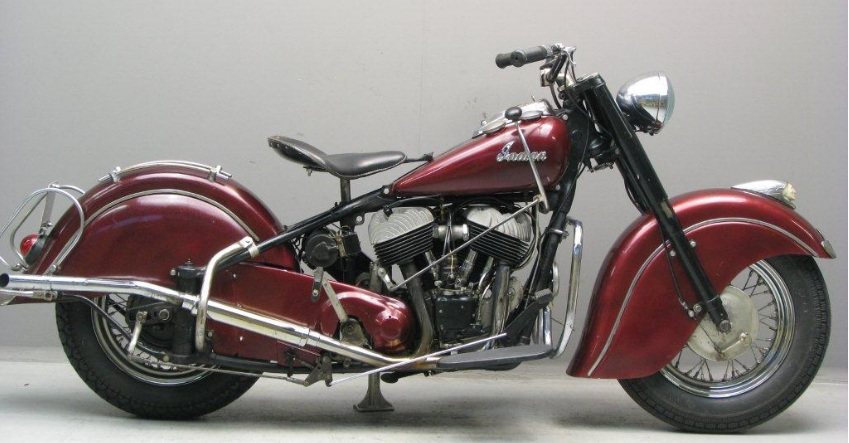
Indian Chief Black Hawk

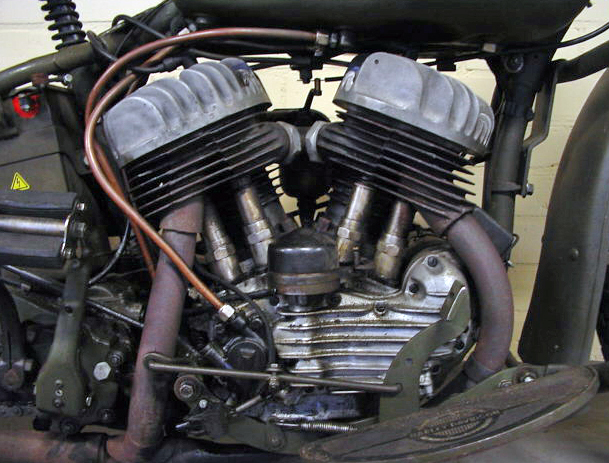
Harley-Davidson flathead engine

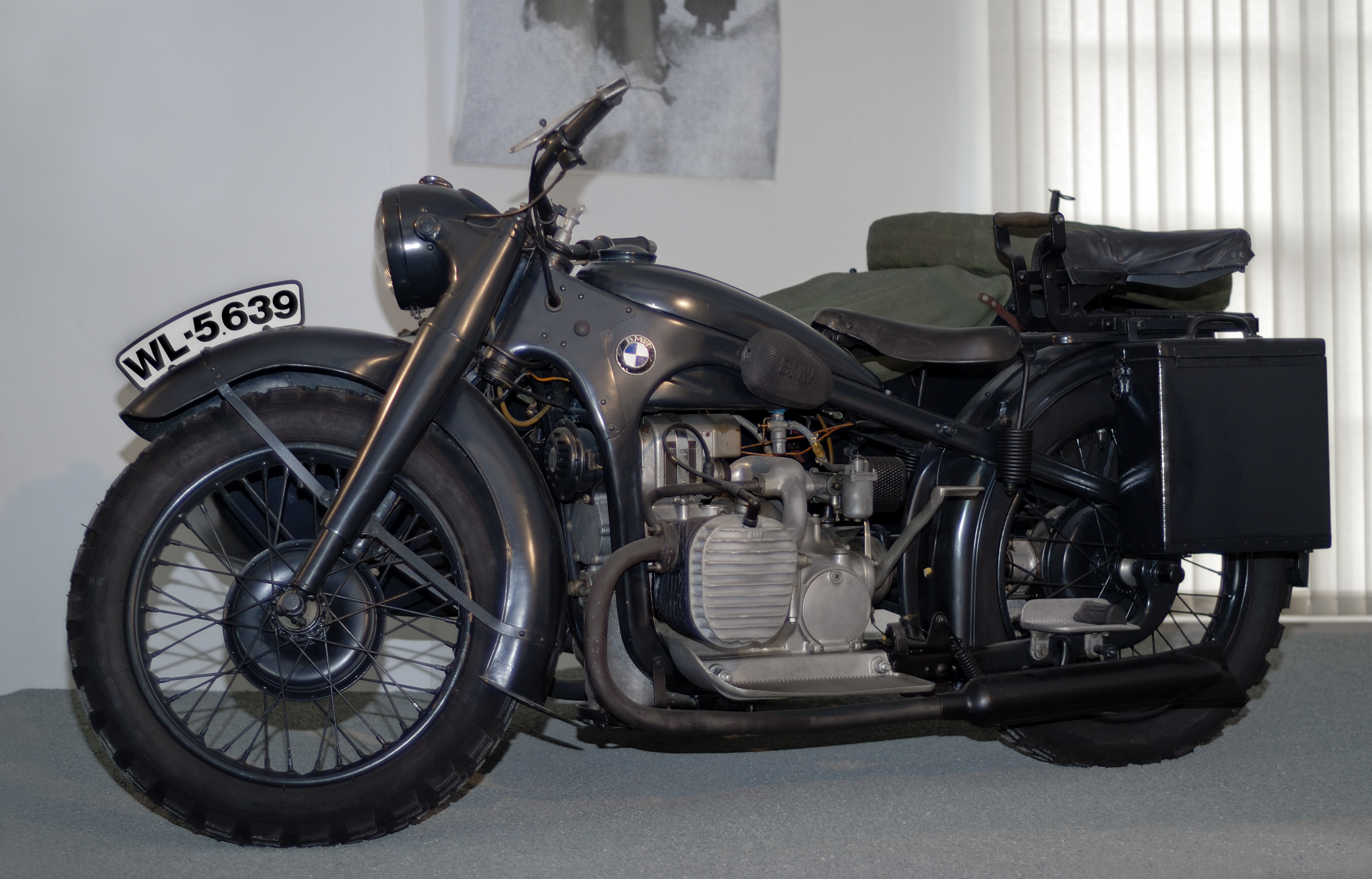
BMW R12

=== Model W, singles, and 45s (DL, RL, and WL) ===
The flathead engine saw service in Harley-Davidson motorcycles beginning with the Model WS flat-twin, produced from 1919 to 1923, and continuing in 1924 with single-cylinder export-model 21-cubic-inch (340 cc) and 30.5-cubic-inch (500 cc) singles and continued in Servi-Cars until 1973. In the domestic U.S. market, the 45-cubic-inch (740 cc) (primary VIN letter) D model (1929 to 1931) and its technical descendant, the (primary VIN letter) R model (1932 to 1936), started Harley's side-valve tradition in the 45-cubic-inch displacement class. The D and R models featured a total-loss oiling system and were succeeded in 1937 by the (primary VIN letter) W 45, which had recirculating oil lubrication. The WLA (W = return oil, L = performance, A = army) went on to serve in World War II as the U.S. and Canadian Army's WLC (C = Canada) primary two-wheeled mount and subsequently as a civilian middleweight through 1952. The engine continued virtually unchanged with 2.745" bore and 3.8125" stroke with various G-based designations in the three-wheeled Servi-Car until production ceased in 1973.

=== K-series and developments ===
In 1952, the K series flatheads was introduced with the same bore and stroke, selling in parallel with the W series (which was discontinued after 1952), designed to compete with British sporting motorcycles of the time. The K models featured a 750cc unit construction engine and transmission case, right side foot shift and left side foot brake. From 1954 to 1956, the KH received an increase in stroke to 4-9/16" to bring displacement to 888cc (54 cubic inches). The K series was replaced by the overhead valve Sportster series in the retail market in 1957.

The American Motorcycle Association (AMA) class C rules of 1952 allowed sidevalves of 750cc to compete against 500cc overhead valve bikes. The 750cc KR factory racer was highly competitive in dirt track and road racing, and was produced in limited numbers until 1969, when the AMA changed the rules by increasing the Class C displacement limit to 750 cc. Without the displacement advantage, the KR flatheads were not competitive against 750 cc overhead valve bikes.

=== Flathead big twins ===
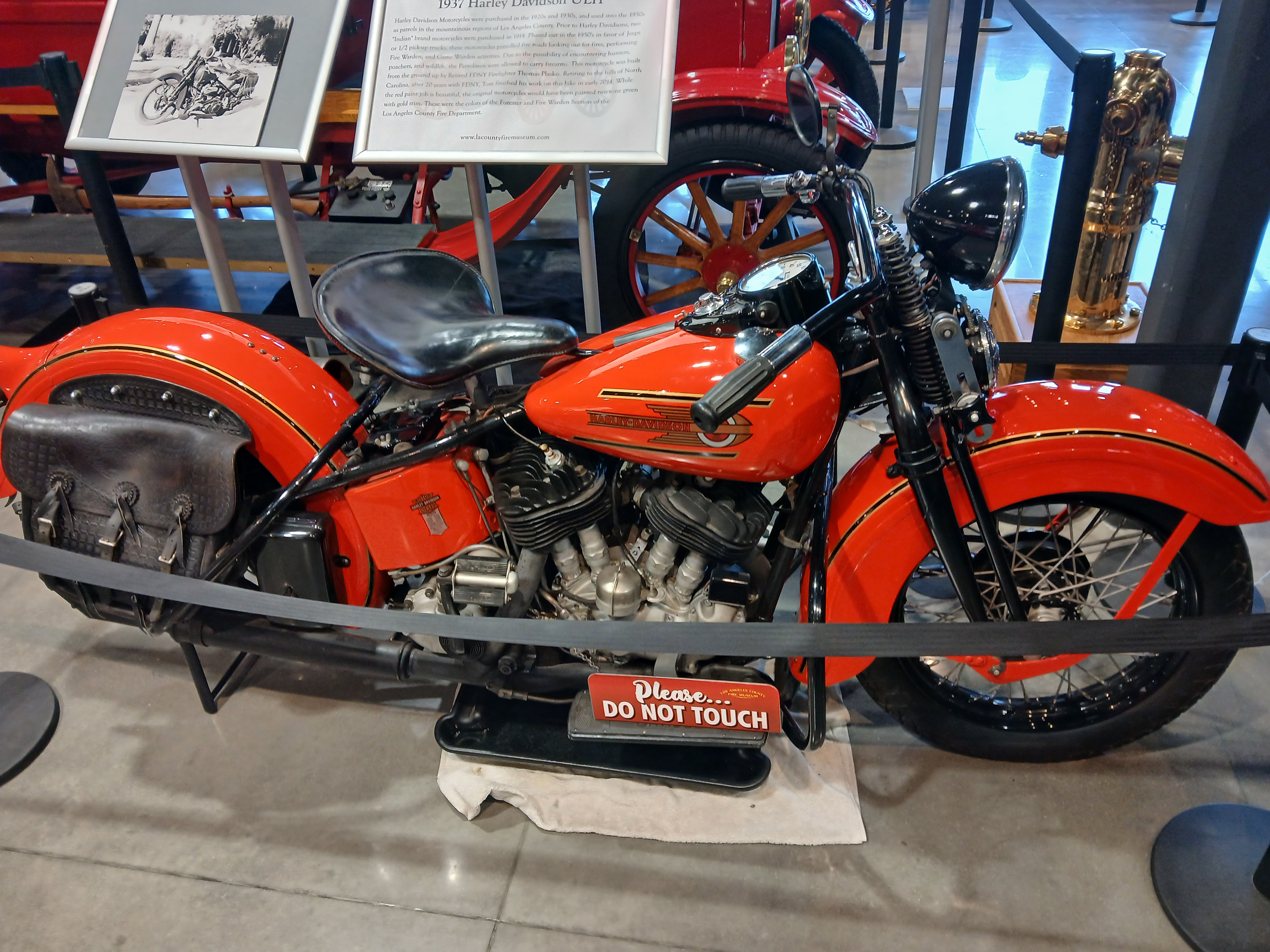
1937 Harley-Davidson ULH Fire Patrol motorcycle at the Los Angeles County Fire Museum

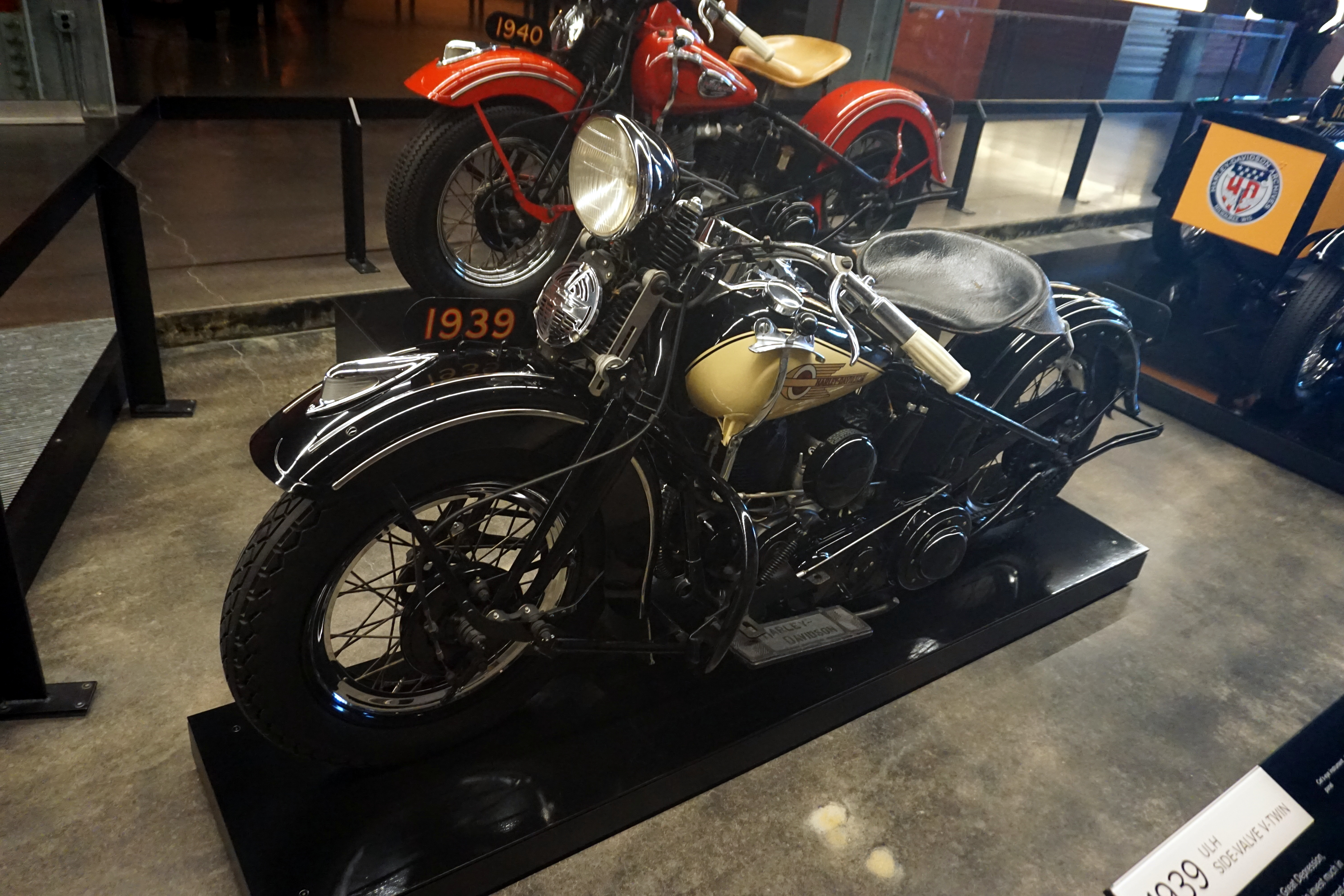
1939 ULH--Side-Valve V-Twin at the Harley-Davidson Museum

In 1930, the 74-cubic-inch (1,210 cc) VL flathead replaced the JD Big Twin, which had featured intake-over-exhaust (IoE) valve configuration. The VL had a single downtube frame and total loss oiling, culminating in an 80-cubic-inch (1,300 cc) version (VLH) in 1935. In 1937, that engine was redesigned to include a recirculating lubrication system, and designated the model U, and it went into the same frame and running gear configuration as the model E Knucklehead, which had originated in 1936. The U continued to be produced in varying configurations as a 74 cubic inch U & UL (1937 to 1948), and 80 cubic inch UH & ULH engine (1937 to 1941). By 1948, the first year of the aluminum-head Panhead, it had been thoroughly superseded and outsold in the marketplace by the superior performance of the overhead valve model Big Twins.
