= Squad 51 =

Truck used in the Emergency! TV series

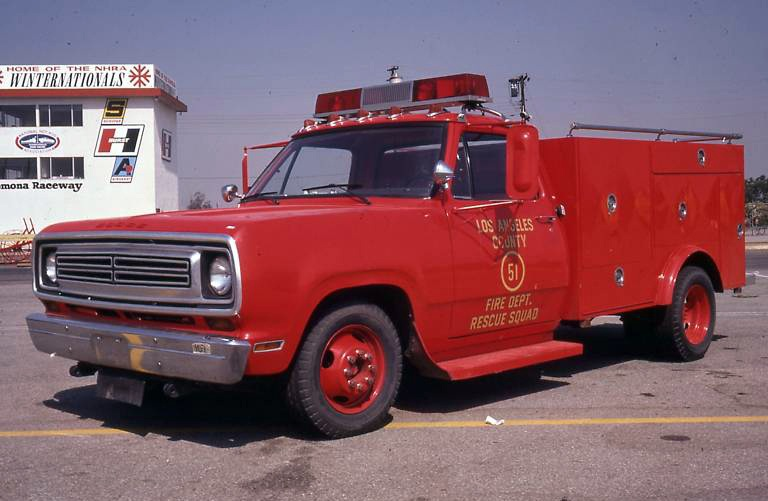
Squad 51 in a photo shot in the 1970s

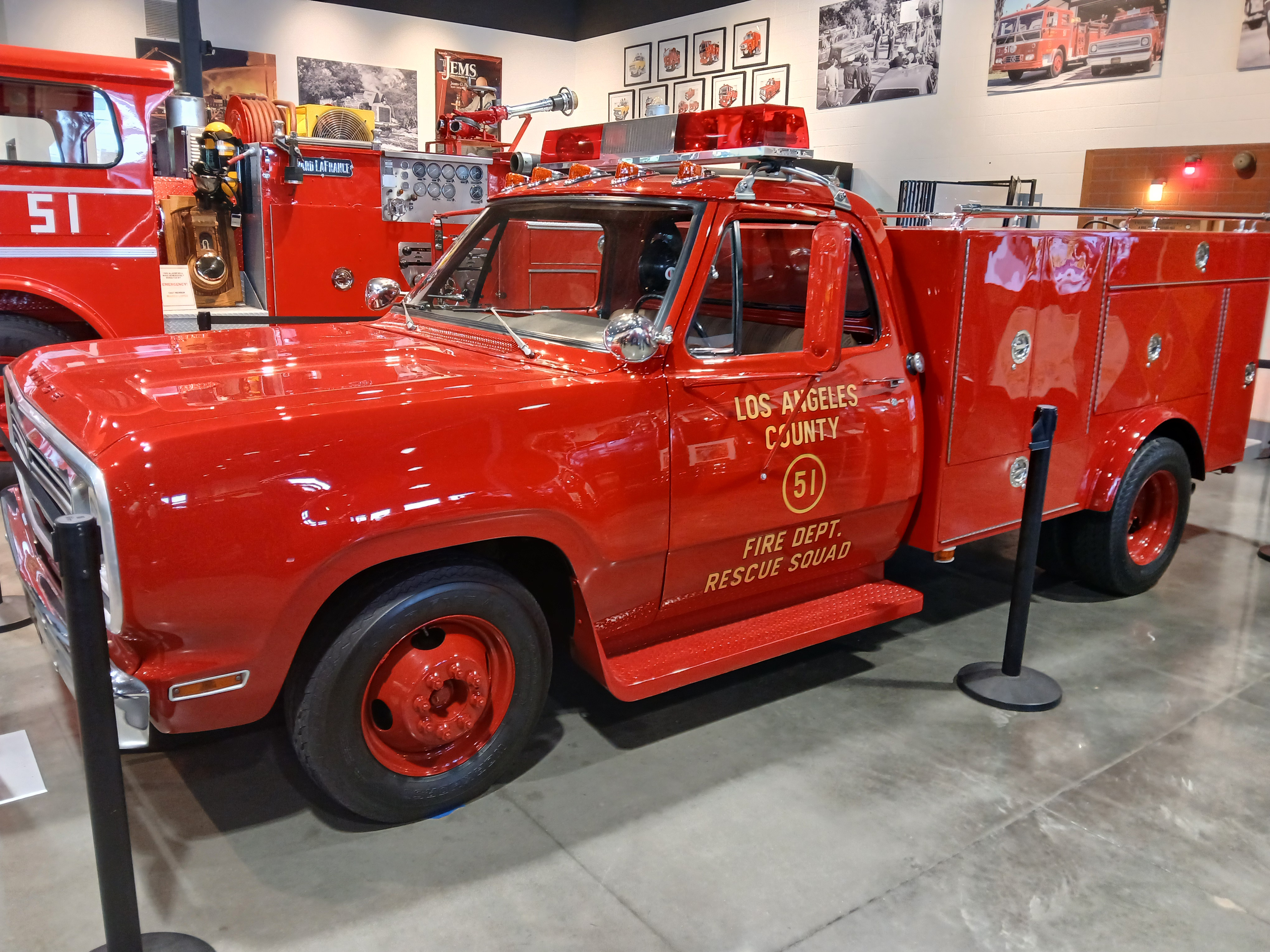
Squad 51 at the Los Angeles County Fire Museum in 2025

Squad 51 is a 1972 Dodge D-300 truck, one of three identical body-style rescue squad vehicles ("squads" or squad truck) that were used in the filming of the American television series Emergency! The squad is powered by a Chrysler 440 cubic inch engine (7.2L), and a 727 Torqueflite automatic transmission. Later models were retrofitted with 1972 model year grilles, so that the extensive stock footage filmed of the squad on city streets could continue to be used. One Ssd, the final 1974 chassis used in the show, is now displayed in the Los Angeles County Fire Museum in Bellflower, California, near the fire engines that served as Engine 51 in the same show.

== History ==
Because of the tight filming schedule, Universal Studios decided to build the vehicle entirely from scratch according to the Los Angeles County Fire Department's specifications at that time. After the filming of Emergency!, Universal Studios donated Squad 51, and it was used as a reserve paramedic vehicle by the LACOFD. In 1999, the title was transferred, and Squad 51 was then donated to the Los Angeles County Fire Museum in Bellflower, California. In the same year it was thoroughly and completely restored by the museum, at a cost of approximately $30,000. Squad 51 is now residing with its co-star in Emergency!, Engine 51, which completed restoration in 2012.

Squad 51 also made appearances in the hit TV show CHiPs at times including season 3 episode 17, "E.M.T.".

Plans call for the museum to completely restore all of the period equipment used during the filming of Emergency!

In 1999, Project 51 took off along with Squad 51 and many of the cast members from Emergency!, and made appearances in Southern California, Lake Tahoe, Las Vegas, Chicago, Long Island, Baltimore, Hyattsville, and Washington DC.

On July 9, 2011, on the apron in front of Station 127 (which doubled as "Station 51" during the series), the newly restored 1973 Ward LaFrance Engine 51 was unveiled next to its old running mate, Squad 51. Thousands of people were in attendance.

== Notes ==
- The "Squad 51" in the Los Angeles County Fire Museum is the last of three vehicles of that model used during the filming of Emergency!. The first was a 1972 D300 1 ton truck cab and chassis. This squad appeared in the first two seasons. An identical 1973 D300 appeared during the third season. The only visible difference was a pair of "D" ring towing lugs bolted under the front bumper and the rear checker plate bumper (for filming purposes). The original Twinsonic lightbar, searchlights, rear compartment box and other external paraphernalia were retained and put on the second vehicle chassis. In season five, the final Squad 51 appeared as a 1974 D300. Again, the external equipment from the original 1972 squad was moved to the third truck. The only discernible with this truck were the black vinyl trim covers on the insides of the cab doors, and the headlight bezels painted matte black. The two previous truck cabs had all metal doors with no vinyl covers. Interestingly, when filming of "Emergency" began in 1972, the L.A. County Fire Department began to switch over to Ford trucks. In the series, some stock footage shots showed the squad as a prior generation 1970 Dodge D300 model. As the show progressed, this footage was no longer used.
- The original gasoline powered 440 ci motor is still in the vehicle.
- The restoration cost was about $30,000 due to the restoration being a complete "frame off" restoration.
- Canonically, the squad is unfortunately destroyed in the TV movie Survival on Charter 220 when it is crushed by a plane engine. A previous generation 1970 Dodge D300 was used to take its place.
- Squad 51 contained actual medical equipment including a Biophone per the Los Angeles County Fire Department specs of the era.
