= Ward LaFrance Truck Corporation =

Defunct American truck and fire apparatus manufacturer

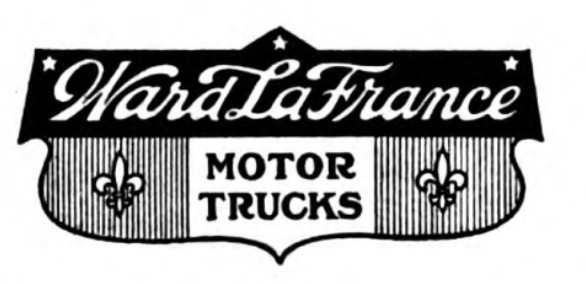
- Industry: motor vehicle
- Founded: 1916
- Founder: Addison Ward LaFrance
- Defunct: 1979
- Successor: Ward 79 Limited (1979-1990)
- Headquarters: United States
- Products: Fire apparatus and truck manufacturer

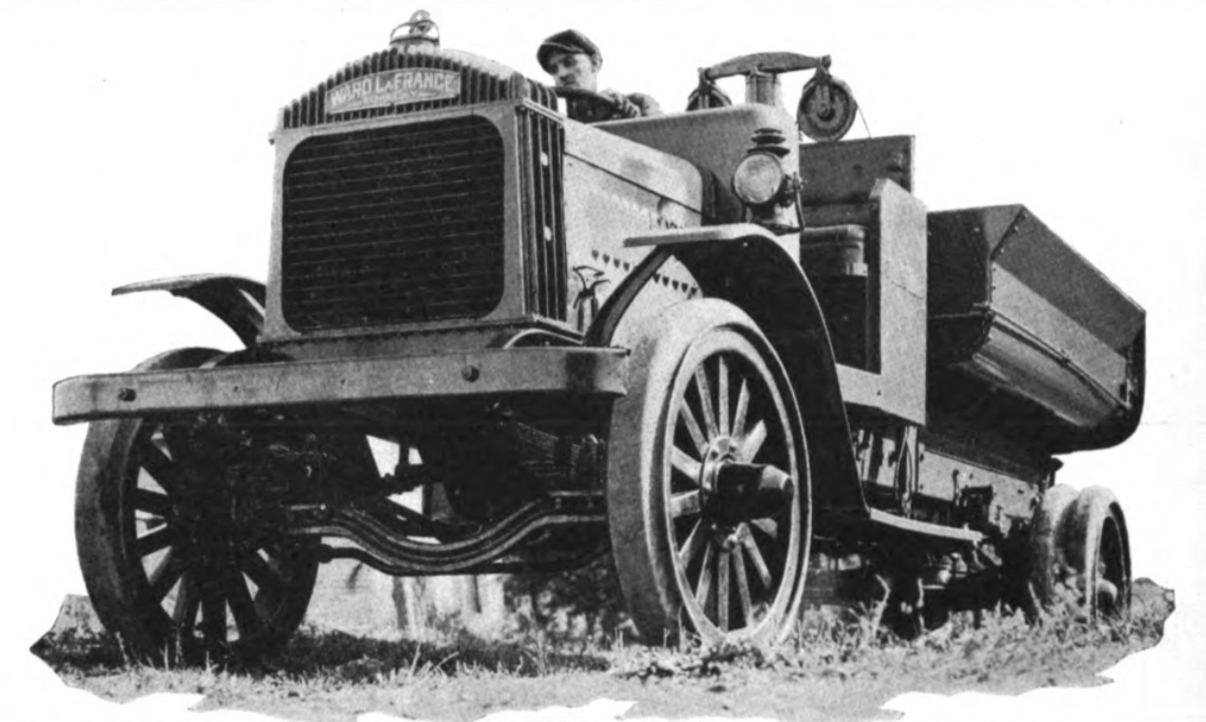
Ward LaFrance (1920)

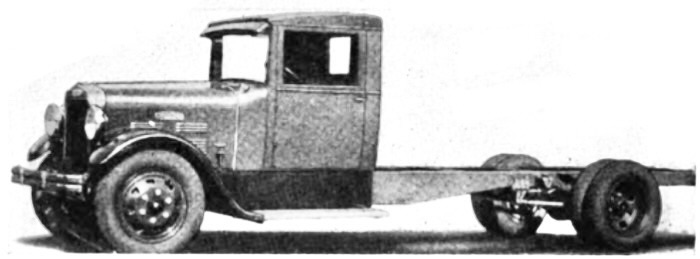
Ward LaFrance Model 25B (1930)

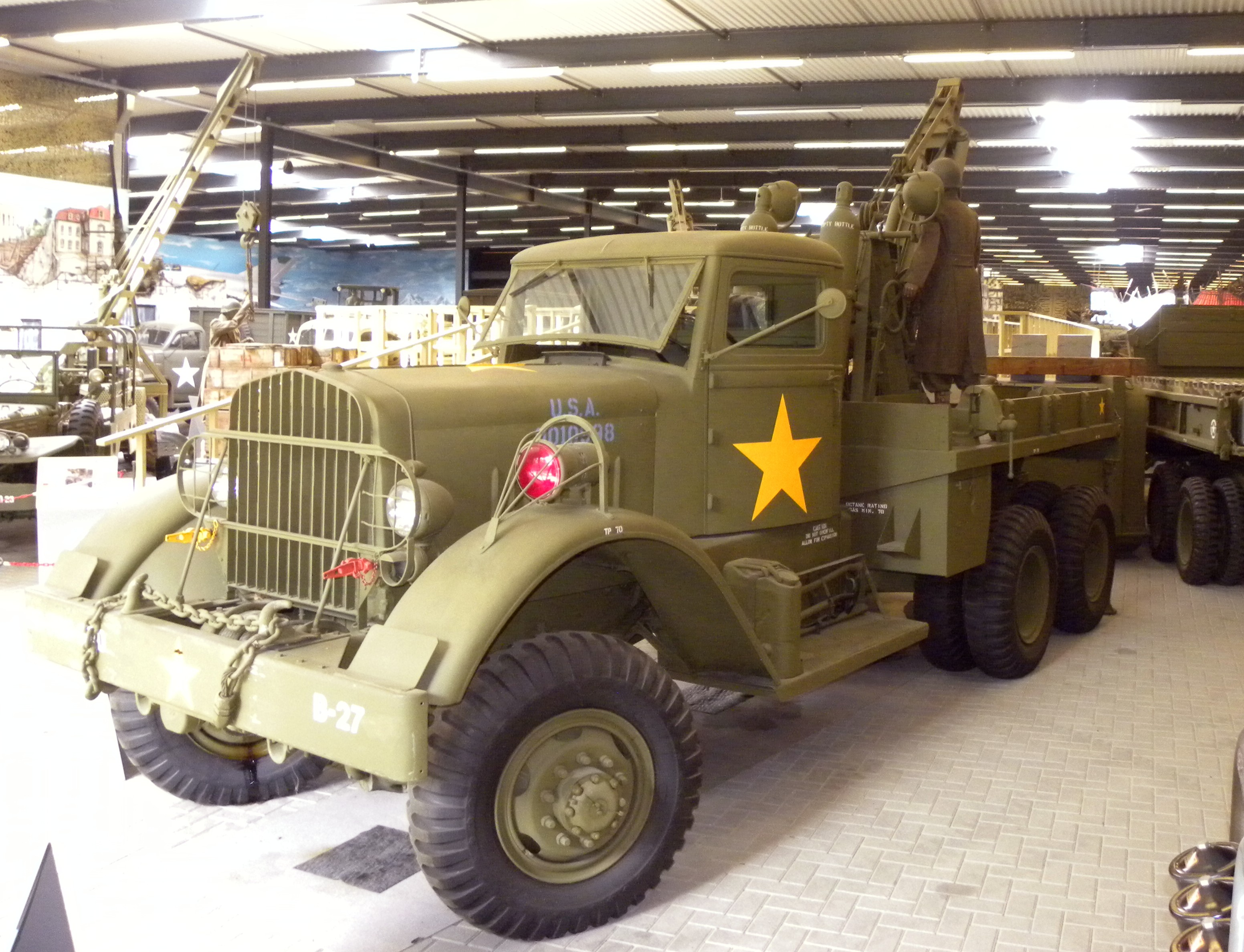
Ward LaFrance 1000 series 2 (1940-1945)

The Ward LaFrance Truck Corporation was an American manufacturer of trucks and fire apparatus founded by Addison Ward LaFrance in 1916 in Elmira Heights, New York. The company ceased operations in 1979.

== History and trucks ==
LaFrance was a relative of Truckson LaFrance, the founder of the similarly named fire apparatus manufacturer American LaFrance, and had worked at the legendary apparatus builder before beginning to build his own trucks and apparatus.

The early trucks used Waukesha engines, Timken Company axles, and Brown-Lipe-Chapin transmissions. They also had a bulky and complex self-lubricating system installed. In 1929 LaFrance added two bus chassis to the line, and in 1930 the "Bustruk" chassis was introduced which was adaptable for both bus and van bodies. With its major market being New York City, LaFrance often produced specialized vehicles for the city, including a 4x4 crane truck for towing cars. In 1934 the company started using more and more diesel engines, such as the one used in a cab-over-engine 6 wheeled truck in 1935. One chassis type was offered in both steel frame or Duralumin, but since these proved costly to make it was later dropped in favor of the more conventional heat-treated channel frame.

In 1945 the company attempted to sell market buses overseas which would have been powered by Buda engines. Instead, Westinghouse proposed a trolley bus version which was called the Westram which saw a few sales in Argentina and Mexico. While the overseas market never really took off, sales for the domestic market picked up during the post-WWII era boom, with Ward LaFrance introducing the D-series 40,000 to 60,000 lb trucks powered by either gasoline Continental engines or diesel Cummins engines. The company also marketed trucks for sale in Canada. However, after the boom ended, sales of load-bearing trucks quickly dropped off.

Ward LaFrance (along with Kenworth) built tank wreckers for the US military (the M1 and M1A1), as well as 6x4 and 6x6 load-bearing trucks. They also built vans for United Parcel Service, over-the-road tractors, cement trucks, dump trucks, chassis for buses and trolleys, and armored cars. From 1975 to 1977 they produced the M746 Heavy Equipment Transport System for the military.

== Products ==
1918 production 15 trucks

- 2A (2 to) Continental Motor
- 3A (3 to) Continental Motor

1919 production 108 trucks

- 2A (2 to) Continental Motor
- 3A (3 to) Continental Motor

Name changed from "LaFrance" to "Ward LaFrance" beginning 1920.

1920 production 233 trucks

- 2B (2,5to)
- 3B (3 to)
- 4A (3,5 to)
- 5A (5 to)

1921 production 96 trucks

- 2B (2,5to)
- 3B (3 to)
- 4A (3,5 to)
- 5A (5 to)

1922 production 31 trucks

- 2B (2,5to)
- 3B (3 to)
- 4A (3,5 to)
- 5A (5 to)

1923 production 16 trucks

- 2B (2,5-3,5 to)
- 3B (2,5-3,5 to)
- 4A (3,5-5 to)
- 5A (5-7 to)

1924 production 100 trucks

- 2B (2,5-3,5 to)
- 3B (2,5-3,5 to)
- 4A (3,5-5 to)
- 5A (5-7 to)

1925 production <100 trucks

- 2B (2,5-3,5 to)
- 3B (2,5-3,5 to)
- 4B (3,5-4 to)
- 5B (5 to)
- 7B (7 to)

1926 production <100 trucks

- 2C (2 to)
- 2B (2,5 to)
- 3B (2,5 to)
- 4B (3,5 to)
- 5B (5 to)
- 7B (7 to)
- 7B (7 to) more HP
- 4B6 (3,5 to)
- 5B6 (5 to)
- 7B6 (7 to)

1927 production <100 trucks

- 2C (2 to)
- 2B (2,5 to)
- 3B (2,5 to)
- 4B (3,5 to)
- 5B (5 to)
- 7B (7 to)
- 7B (7 to) more HP
- 4B6 (3,5 to)
- 5B6 (5 to)
- 7B6 (7 to)

1928

- 2C (2,5 to) Waukesha Engine with 4,119 cc (1928-1930)
- 2D (2,5 to)
- 2B (3 to) Waukesha Engine with 5,666 cc (1925-1930)
- 2B6 (3 to) Waukesha Engine with 5,406 cc (1927-1930)
- 4B (3,5 to) Waukesha Engine with 6,516 cc (1925-1930)
- 4B6 (3,5 to) Waukesha Engine with 7,104 cc (1926-1930)
- ⟨4B6 (Bus)⟩
- 4E6 (3,5 to)
- 4D (4 to)
- 4D6 (4 to)
- 4R6 (5 to)
- 5B (5 to) Waukesha Engine with 8,044 cc (1925-1930)
- 5B6 (5 to) Waukesha Engine with 8,992 cc (1927-1930)
- 7B (7 to) Waukesha Engine with 10,181 cc (1925-1930)
- 7D (7 to)
- 7B6 (7 to)

1929

- 20R (2 to)
- 25R (2,5 to)
- 2B (3 to) Waukesha Engine with 5,666 cc (1925-1930)
- 2B6 (3 to) Waukesha Engine with 5,406 cc (1927-1930)
- 30R (3 to)
- 4B (3,5 to) Waukesha Engine with 6,516 cc (1925-1930)
- 4B6 (3,5 to) Waukesha Engine with 7,104 cc (1926-1930)
- 4E6 (3,5 to)
- 35R (3,5 to)
- 4D6 (4 to)
- 5D (5 to)
- 5B6 (5 to) Waukesha Engine with 8,992 cc (1927-1930)
- 7B6 (7 to)
- 7D (7 to)
- ⟨29B (Bus)⟩
- ⟨39B (Bus)⟩

1930

- 25B (3 to) 5,278 cc (1930-?)
- 50D (7 to) Waukesha Engine SRL with 7,760 cc
- 70C (7 to) Waukesha Engine SRL with 7,760 cc
- 7B6 (7 to)
- 75D (15 to) Waukesha Engine with 10,135 cc (1930-?)

1940

- 1000 series 2 (6 to) 7,568 cc (1940-1945)

== Fire trucks ==
In 1931 Ward LaFrance built their first fire engine and this remained their primary product. Open-cab ladder trucks were produced until 1960. Forward-cab trucks were introduced in 1959. In 1971 the company pioneered the movement away from the traditional red color after experiments by an optometrist showed that lime yellow was more readily visible, and by 1975 they had produced lime yellow fire engines for over 140 fire departments across the United States, El Salvador, Saudi Arabia, Colombia, and Venezuela.

Perhaps the best-known Ward LaFrance product was the P-80 "Ambassador" model of pumper, one of which was donated as product placement by the company to be used as the fictional Los Angeles County Fire Department Engine 51 on the 1970s television program Emergency!.

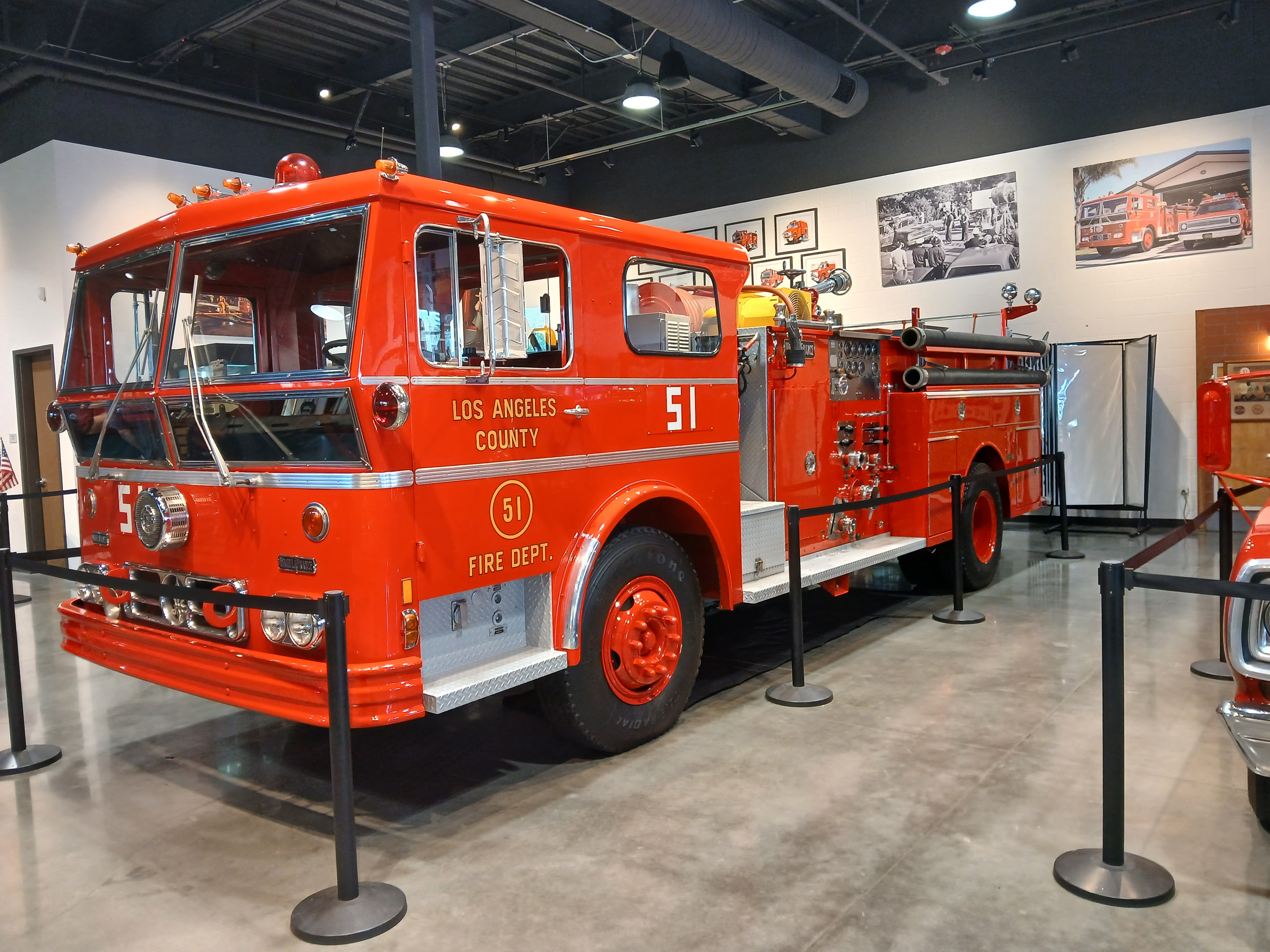
The Ward LaFrance in 2025 at Los Angeles County Fire Museum

== Closure ==
A. Ward LaFrance died in 1972. In 1976 the ailing company was purchased by a group of private investors but closed for good in 1979. The facilities were reopened by a new, unaffiliated company under the name Ward '79 Limited which operated until 14 December, 1990.

== See also ==
- G-numbers (G116)
