= Crown Supercoach =

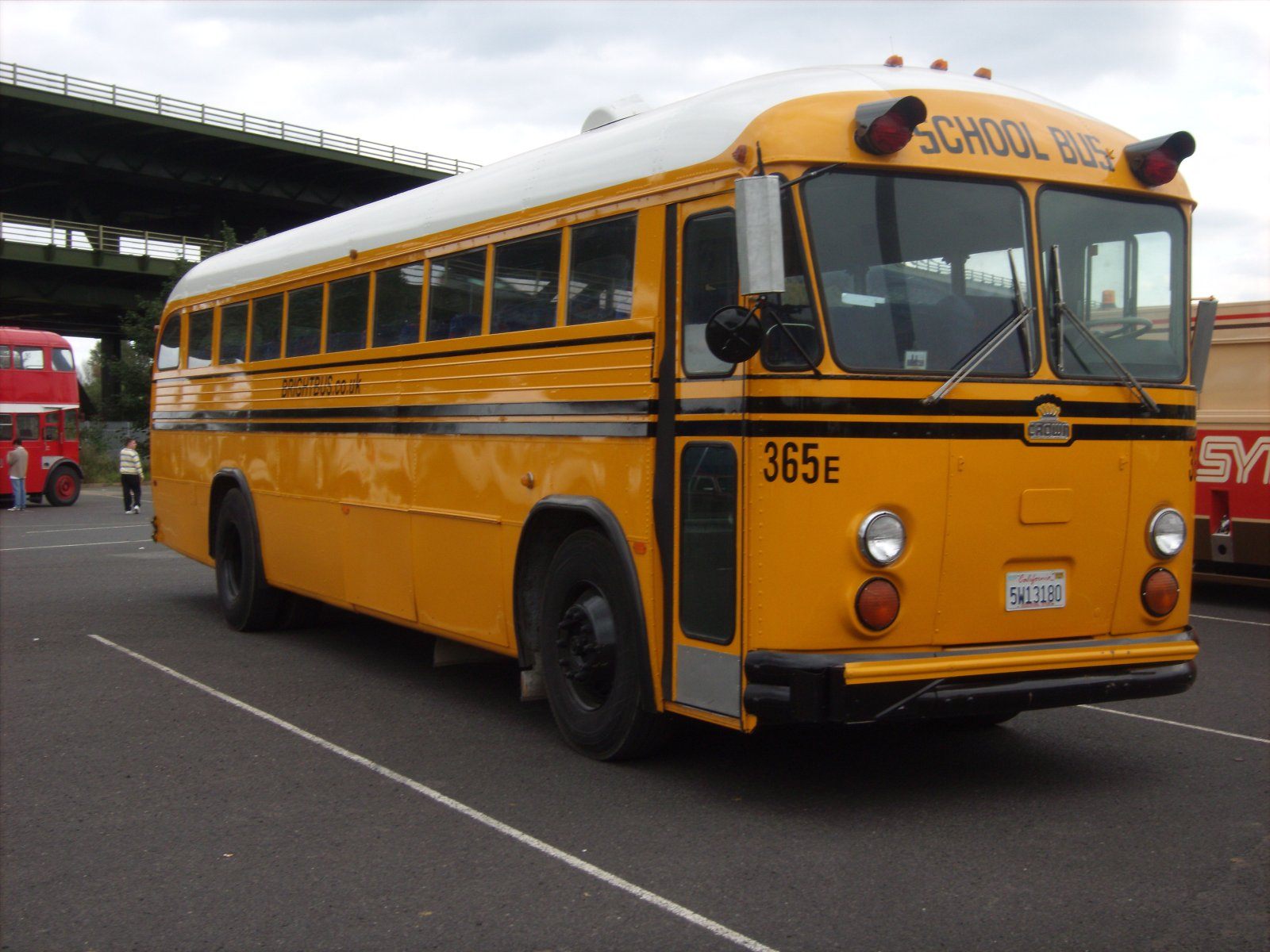
- 1977–1991 Supercoach (retired) at a UK bus rally

Overview
- Type: School bus; Motorcoach
- Manufacturer: Crown Coach Corporation
- Production: 1948–1991

Body and chassis
- Class: Type D (transit style)
- Doors: Single-door
- Floor type: High-floor
- Chassis: Monocoque stressed skin: Underfloor or rear engine Single or tandem rear axles
- Related: Crown Firecoach

Powertrain
- Engine: Gasoline Hall-Scott; Waukesha; International Harvester; Ford Super Duty Diesel; Cummins; Detroit Diesel; Caterpillar Methanol; Detroit Diesel Compressed natural gas John Deere (cancelled)
- Capacity: 72–97
- Power output: 210–335 hp
- Transmission: 4-speed automatic 6-speed automatic 5-speed manual 10-speed manual

Dimensions
- Length: 35–40 feet
- Width: 96 inches

Chronology
- Predecessor: Crown Super Coach (1935–1948)

The Crown Supercoach is a bus that was manufactured and marketed by Crown Coach Corporation from 1948 to 1991. While most examples were sold as yellow school buses, the Supercoach formed the basis for motorcoaches and other specialty vehicles using the same body and chassis. While technically available outside of the West Coast, nearly all Crown school buses were sold in Washington state, Oregon and California.

From 1948 to 1984, the Supercoach was constructed at the Crown Coach facilities in Los Angeles, California. From 1984 to the 1991 closure of the company, the Supercoach was constructed in Chino, California.

== Design history ==
=== 1932–1948 ===
In 1932, Crown Motor Carriage Company built its first complete school bus, in a shift from building bus bodies on cowled truck chassis. Externally modeled after Twin Coach body designs, the school bus body used a front-engine layout, with the Waukesha gasoline engine positioned next to the driver. The body was of all-metal construction with an integrated chassis and safety glass; for braking, in addition to the standard hydraulic service brakes, the Crown bus was equipped with a redundant hand-operated system alongside the standard parking/emergency brake.

From 1932 to 1935, Crown Body and Coach Corporation produced additional forward-control school buses. As the original 1932 design proved too expensive to produce on a large scale, Crown shifted to a design based on a Reo commercial truck chassis. Named the Metropolitan, while still a front-engine bus, the new design significantly decreased forward visibility.

In 1935, Crown revisited the 1932 design, introducing a new version as the first Crown Super Coach. With a seating capacity of up to 76 students, it was one of the largest school buses ever produced at the time. As with its 1932 predecessor, the 1935 Crown Super Coach featured an all-steel body with an integrated chassis, safety glass, and a front-engine body. In a big change, the redundant braking system was redesigned, with the Supercoach featuring full air brakes.

In 1936, Crown produced the Super Coach as an intercity motorcoach, featuring onboard sleeper compartments. To maximize interior room, the powertrain layout was changed from front-engine to an underfloor mid-engine configuration. In several variants, the Crown Super Coach would retain an underfloor layout through its 1991 discontinuation. In 1937, Crown would build the first mid-engine school bus, with a Hall-Scott gasoline engine; the change expanded capacity to 79 passengers. To provide proper engine cooling, the bus was fitted with a front-mounted radiator.

In 1940, Crown Coach redesigned the Super Coach bus body and chassis, moving the engine to the rear. Featuring a wider and taller interior, the Supercoach gained additional emergency exits (a rear exit window and right-side emergency door), following the standardization of school bus dimensions and exits in 1939.

During World War II, Crown Coach produced few vehicles, with all production diverted towards military use. In late 1945, Crown resumed production of Super Coach school and coach buses, struggling to meet demand. To better ensure its survival after the war, Crown entered a joint venture with Indiana school bus manufacturer Wayne Works, becoming the West Coast distributor of its product lines.

=== 1948–1960 ===
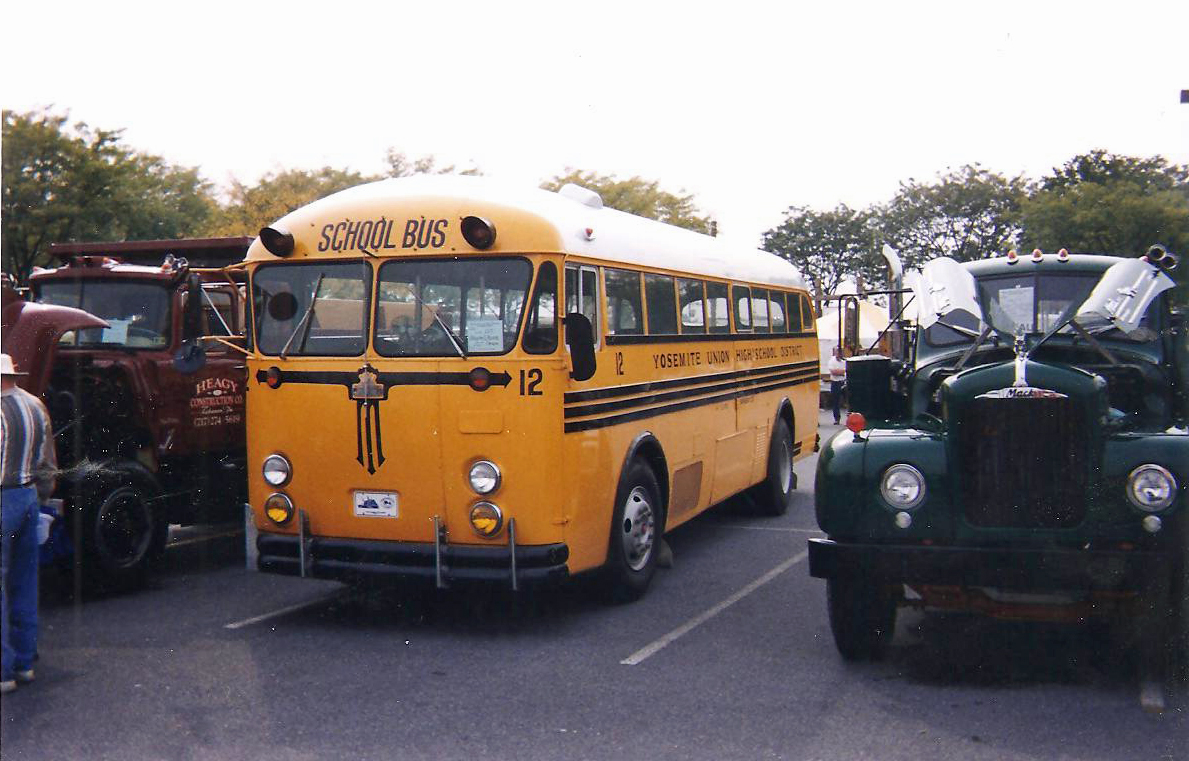
Late 1950s Crown Supercoach (restored)

In 1946, Crown began development on a new generation of vehicles. Starting life as a sightseeing bus for a motorcoach customer, the new-generation Supercoach (renamed as a single word) entered production in 1948, with Crown producing its first school bus example in late 1949.

In a move back to the mid-engine layout, the design of the 1950 Crown Supercoach broke many precedents in school bus construction. Although built on a steel frame, to fight corrosion, the body panels of the Supercoach were of aluminum. In place of the traditional ladder truck-style frame, the Supercoach featured a monocoque-style integrated frame.

In the early 1950s, Crown made several additions to the Supercoach model line. In 1951, the Crown Firecoach fire engine was introduced, heavily based on the mid-engine chassis of the Supercoach bus. At the same time, Crown began to explore other uses for the Supercoach; in 1954, several Crown Cargo Coach "brucks" were produced, combining the front body of a bus with the rear body of a van trailer. Crown Security Coaches came into use as prison buses throughout the West Coast.

In 1954, Crown introduced the first diesel-powered school bus, introducing the 743 cubic-inch Cummins NHH220 as an option. For school districts with growing student populations, Crown introduced a tandem rear-axle Supercoach in 1955. Expanding the seating capacity from 79 to 91 (with a later option for 97), this would become the highest-capacity school bus ever mass-produced (alongside similar Gillig Transit Coach DT-models).

To increase braking power, in 1956, Crown standardized 10-inch wide brake drums on all vehicles, the largest in the bus industry at the time.

=== 1960–1977 ===
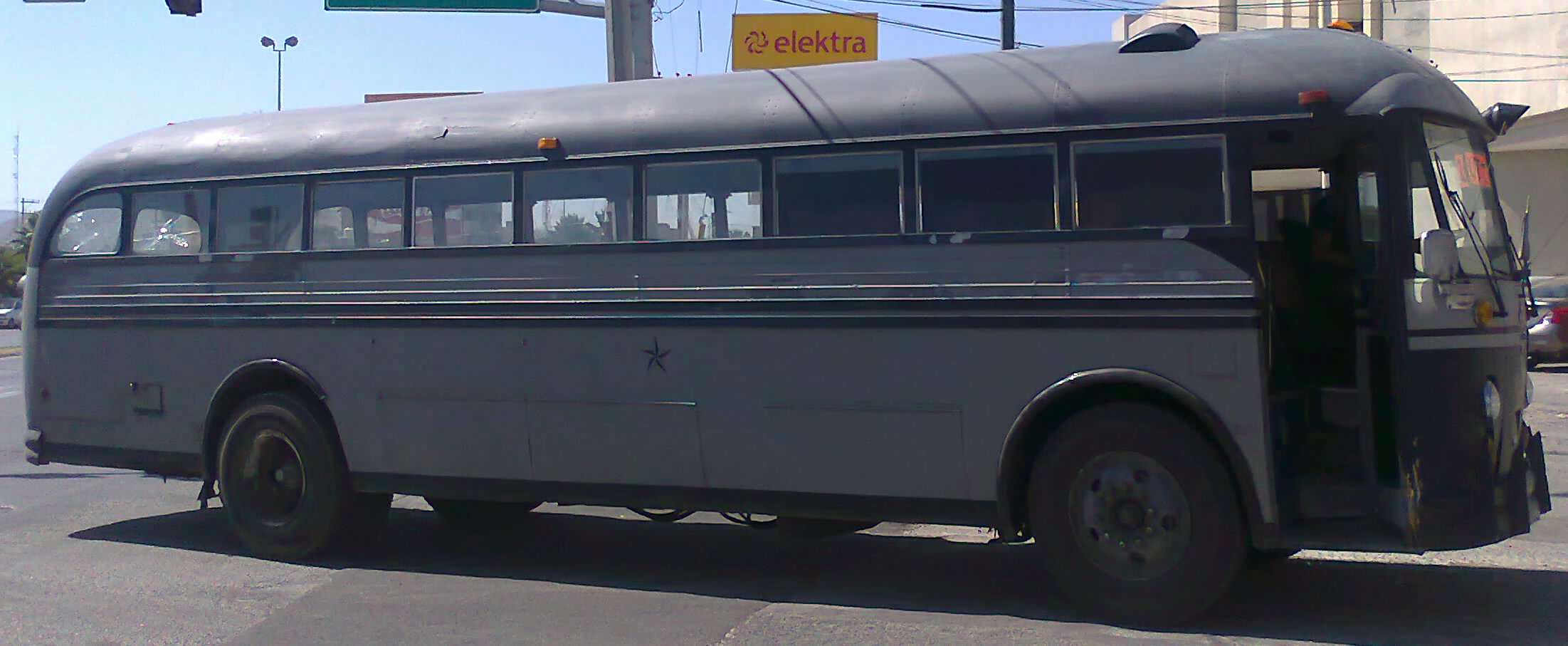
Retired 1960s Crown Supercoach in Mexico

In 1960, the body of the Crown Supercoach underwent its first set of modifications since its introduction in late 1949. To enhance visibility, the windshield, driver window, and entry door windows were redesigned. To make the bus more visible, Crown moved the taillamps and brake lights from the doors of the luggage compartment towards the rear corners of the body.

Although overtaken by school bus production, Crown continued production of the Supercoach as an intercity coach in various lengths. Designed similar to a GM Buffalo bus, the longest versions featured a raised deck over the luggage compartment; Crown also produced a bilevel coach similar to the GMC Scenicruiser in configuration.

During the 1960s, Crown began to further expand its engine line. To aid the performance of its 91-passenger buses, a 262 hp turbocharged Cummins NHH was added. Alongside the Cummins diesel, an additional option included an underfloor version of the Detroit Diesel 671. In 1973, the 743 cubic-inch Cummins NHH diesel was replaced by the 855 cubic-inch NHH diesel, requiring internal structural updates to the frame. From the outside, 1973–1977 Crown school buses are distinguished by flat-topped wheel wells.

=== 1977–1991 ===
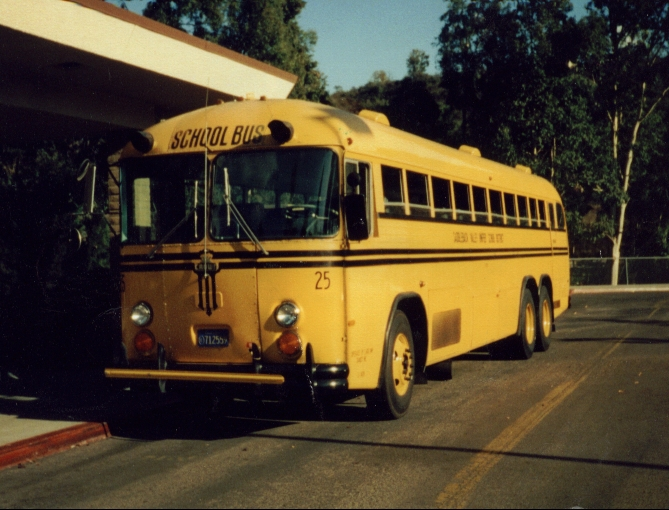
1978 Supercoach 90-passenger

During the 1977 model year, federal regulations took effect that forever changed school bus design in the United States. To better protect passengers from crashes and rollovers, the structures of many school buses had to be updated; the metal-backed seats seen for decades were replaced by thickly padded, taller seats. Aside from the redesign of the passenger seats, which led to minor capacity reductions, the structure of the Supercoach needed relatively few changes to meet the new regulations; the company claimed that the Supercoach was compliant as far back as 1950. Post-1977 Supercoaches are distinguished by larger pillars behind the drivers' window and entry door as well as the fixed window next to the side emergency door.

In the late 1980s, along with the Crown Supercoach Series II, Crown began to expand the Supercoach lineup beyond its traditional two models. In 1988, a 38-foot version (84-passenger) was introduced. In 1989, two new 40-foot versions were introduced: a rear-engine and a single rear axle mid-engine.

In March 1991, Crown Coach closed its doors; the final vehicle produced was a 36-foot mid-engine Supercoach (with standard body).

== Supercoach II (1989–1991) ==
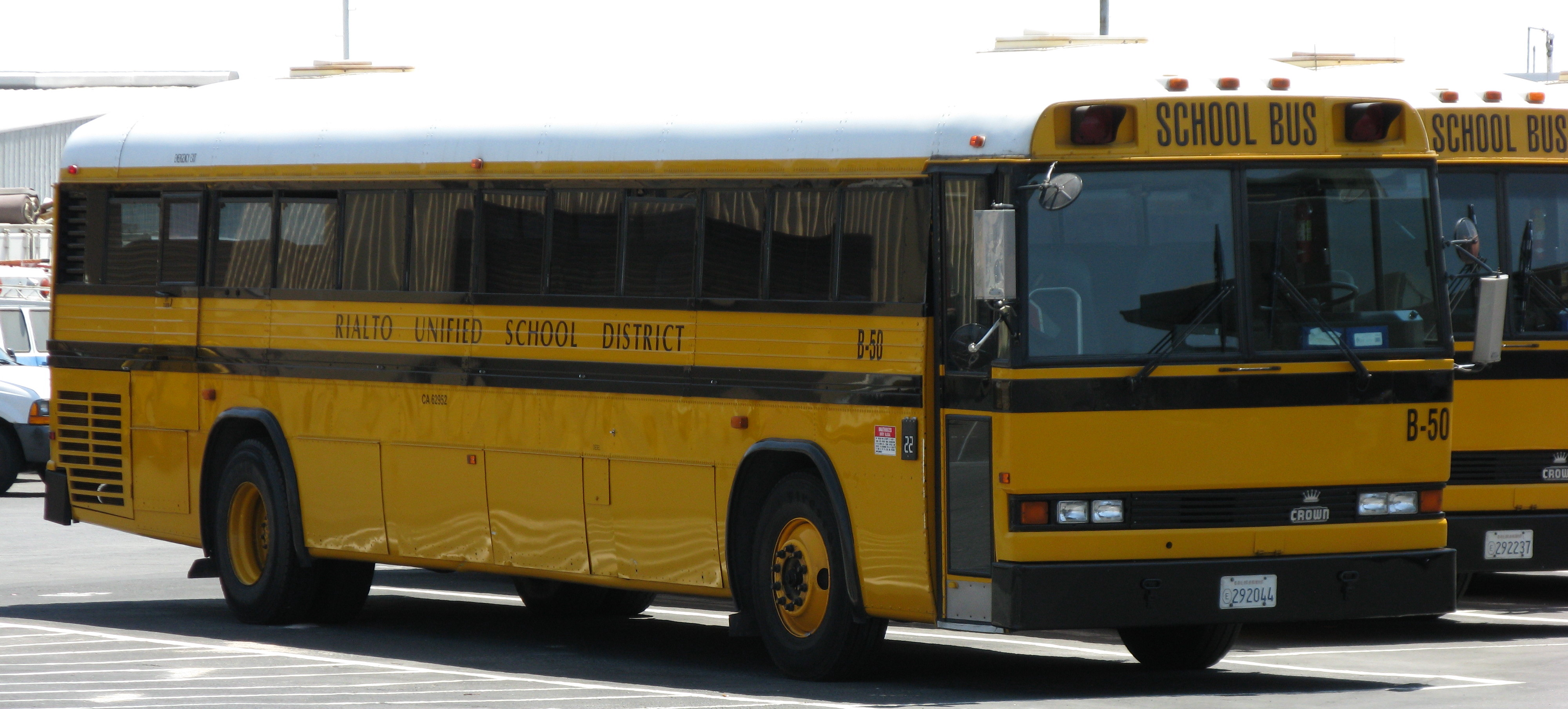
1989–1991 Crown Supercoach Series II

During 1989, Crown Coach introduced the Crown Supercoach Series II (internally designated N-body). Developed for Crown to participate in a multi-year California Energy Commission study of the feasibility of alternative fuel school buses, the Series II introduced the first major visible changes to the Supercoach since its 1949 introduction.

Alongside buses created for the CEC design study, the model line entered production alongside the standard Crown Supercoach (internally designated C-body).

=== California Energy Commission program ===
Produced for the first phase of the CEC study, 153 Crown Series II buses were acquired, including 103 "advanced diesel" and 50 methanol-fuel buses. As a secondary objective of the study, the buses researched the practicality of advanced safety features for school districts replacing buses manufactured before 1977, including fire suppression systems, an increase in emergency exits, taller seats (made of additional flame-retardant material), anti-lock brakes (ABS), and automatic parking brakes.

Lasting until 2002, the CEC program lasted through four stages of research into alternative fuels and safety and technology advances; methanol was ultimately abandoned as an alternative fuel (in favor of further development of compressed natural gas and diesel buses), with virtually all of the methanol-fuel Supercoach II units converted to operate on diesel fuel.

As Crown Coach ceased to exist after March 1991, the company only participated in the initial phase of the CEC program.

=== Design overview ===
During the late 1980s, the only methanol-fuel engine that complied with California emissions standards was the Detroit Diesel 6V92. To accommodate the wider V6 engine in the rear of the Supercoach, substantial revisions were required for the chassis and rear bodywork. Aft of the rear axle, the rear body panels were widened, necessitating a redesigned rear roofline (creating a wider, vertical rear window). In a match to the rear revisions, the front bodywork received a squared-off roofline above the rear door, enlarged windshield (with four-piece flat glass), and flat body panels (changing to horizontally-mounted quad headlamps). To maximize engineering commonality with the standard Supercoach, nearly all of the bodywork of the Supercoach II between the entry door and rear seats was shared with its predecessor. The drivers' compartment underwent a substantial redesign, grouping secondary controls together left of the driver.

Following the production of the 153 CEC buses, Crown continued production of the Supercoach II as a secondary model line alongside the standard Supercoach; alongside the rear-engine configuration, a mid-engine configuration was introduced. Produced primarily in a rear-engine 40-foot length, a 38-foot length (rear and mid-engine lengths) was also offered (no tandem-axle units are known to have been assembled). The Detroit Diesel 6V92 continued, with Crown adding the option of Cummins C8.3 inline-6 and Caterpillar 3208 V8 engines; the mid-engine chassis was offered with the Detroit Diesel 6-71.

=== Design epilogue ===
The Supercoach II was offered by Crown Coach through its closure in 1991; however, many of the 1991 vehicles produced by the Crown were of original Crown Supercoach body design. Following the closure of the company, the designs and tooling of Crown Coach were acquired by Indiana-based Carpenter Body Works, who sought to replace its discontinued Corsair with a revived Supercoach II. Carpenter would soon abandon the project, as it could not produce the complex Crown Coach design at a competitive price (a diesel Supercoach II cost over $125,000 in 1990).

While Carpenter would abandon production of the Supercoach II as a whole, several elements of its design would live on in a successive product, the 1992 Carpenter/Spartan Coach RE, including its left-hand driver control panel and its headlight layout. Taking the place of the Supercoach II in the CEC study, the Coach RE offered a methanol-fuel version of the 6V92.

== Powertrain ==
| Engine | Configuration | Fuel | Production | Notes |
|---|---|---|---|---|
| Waukesha | | Gasoline | | |
| Hall-Scott | 590 cu in (9.7 L) OHC I6 779 cu in (12.8 L) OHC I6 | Gasoline | | |
| International Harvester | | Gasoline | | |
| Ford Super Duty | 534 cu in (8.8 L) OHV V8 | Gasoline | | |
| Caterpillar 3208 | 636 cu in (10.4 L) V8 | Diesel | 1989–1990 | Rear-engine Supercoach II |
| Cummins 6C8.3 | 507 cu in (8.3 L) I6 | Diesel | 1989–1991 | Rear-engine Supercoach and Supercoach II |
| Cummins NHH | 743 cu in (12.2 L) I6 855 cu in (14.0 L) I6 | Diesel | 1954–1972 (743) 1973–1991 (855) | Mid-engine Supercoach; first diesel engine in a school bus Available in naturally-aspirated and turbocharged configurations |
| Detroit Diesel 6V53 | 318 cu in (5.2 L) V6 | Diesel | 1961 | Produced as part of a customer-order rear-engine Crown Supercoach |
| Detroit Diesel 6-71/6L71 | 426 cu in (7.0 L) I6 | Diesel | c.1963–1991 | Mid-engine Supercoach; also produced for mid-engine Supercoach II Available in naturally-aspirated and turbocharged configurations Also used in Crown-Ikarus buses. |
| Detroit Diesel 8V71 | 568 cu in (9.3 L) V8 | Diesel | | Used in Crown motorcoaches; not used for school buses |
| Detroit Diesel 6V92 | 552 cu in (9.0 L) V6 | Methanol Diesel | 1989–1991 | Rear-engine Supercoach Series II, bus body designed for use of engine Most methanol-fuel buses converted to diesel. |
| Detroit Diesel 8V92 | 736 cu in (12.1 L) V8 | Diesel | | Used in Crown motorcoaches; not used for school buses |
| John Deere | 8.1L I6 | CNG | Cancelled | Rear-engine Supercoach Series II, was to be introduced in 1992 but due to the closure of Crown Coach Corporation, this option was cancelled. |
