= Los Angeles County Fire Museum =

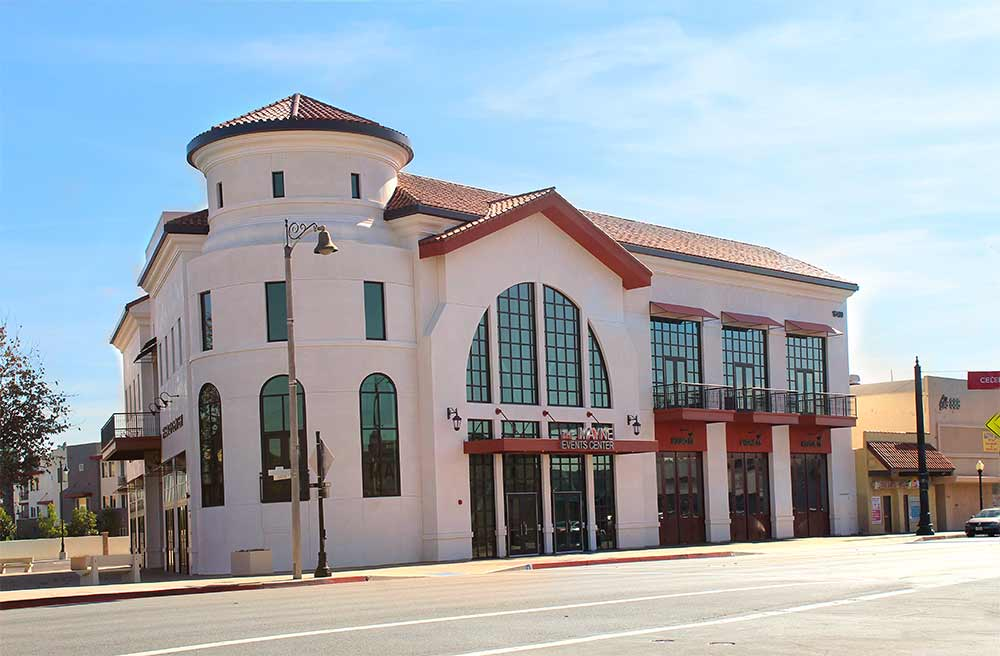
- The Los Angeles County Fire Museum in the Mayne Events Center

- Location in Los Angeles County L.A. County Fire Museum (California) L.A. County Fire Museum (the United States)
- Established: 2008
- Location: 16400 Bellflower Blvd, Bellflower, California, United States
- Coordinates: 33.886025°N 118.124580°W
- Type: Firefighting museum
- Key holdings: Squad 51, Engine 51 (Crown & Ward LaFrance), Disneyland fire engine
- Collections: Antique fire apparatus and equipment from 1860s onward
- Collection size: 60+
- Parking: On-site parking available

The Los Angeles County Fire Museum is a public museum dedicated to the history of the Los Angeles County Fire Department in Los Angeles County, California. The museum has 60 antique fire engines in its collection, including fire engines from the 1860s through just-retired apparatus. Its location for public exhibits is at 16400 Bellflower Blvd, Bellflower, CA, on the ground floor of the Bellflower Mayne Events Center. The museum is open four days a week.

The Flora Vista property is now the museum's restoration shop. This is not open to the public.

This collection includes fire engines pulled to fires by men, horse-drawn steam engines, Los Angeles County Fire Department equipment dating back to the 1920s, the "Disneyland" fire engine, Model T fire engines, and 1950s fire engines. The extensive collection of rigs is changed often as the museum directors display various rigs from the shop and at South Gate.

The most famous exhibits include the featured vehicles of the fictional Fire Station 51, Squad 51, both engines designated Engine 51 and a 1969 Chevrolet ambulance from the 1970s television series, Emergency!.

The museum was located at 9834 Flora Vista St, Bellflower, California from 2008 to mid-2018 and now houses its public collection on the ground floor of the Mayne Events Center at 16400 Bellflower Blvd, Bellflower.

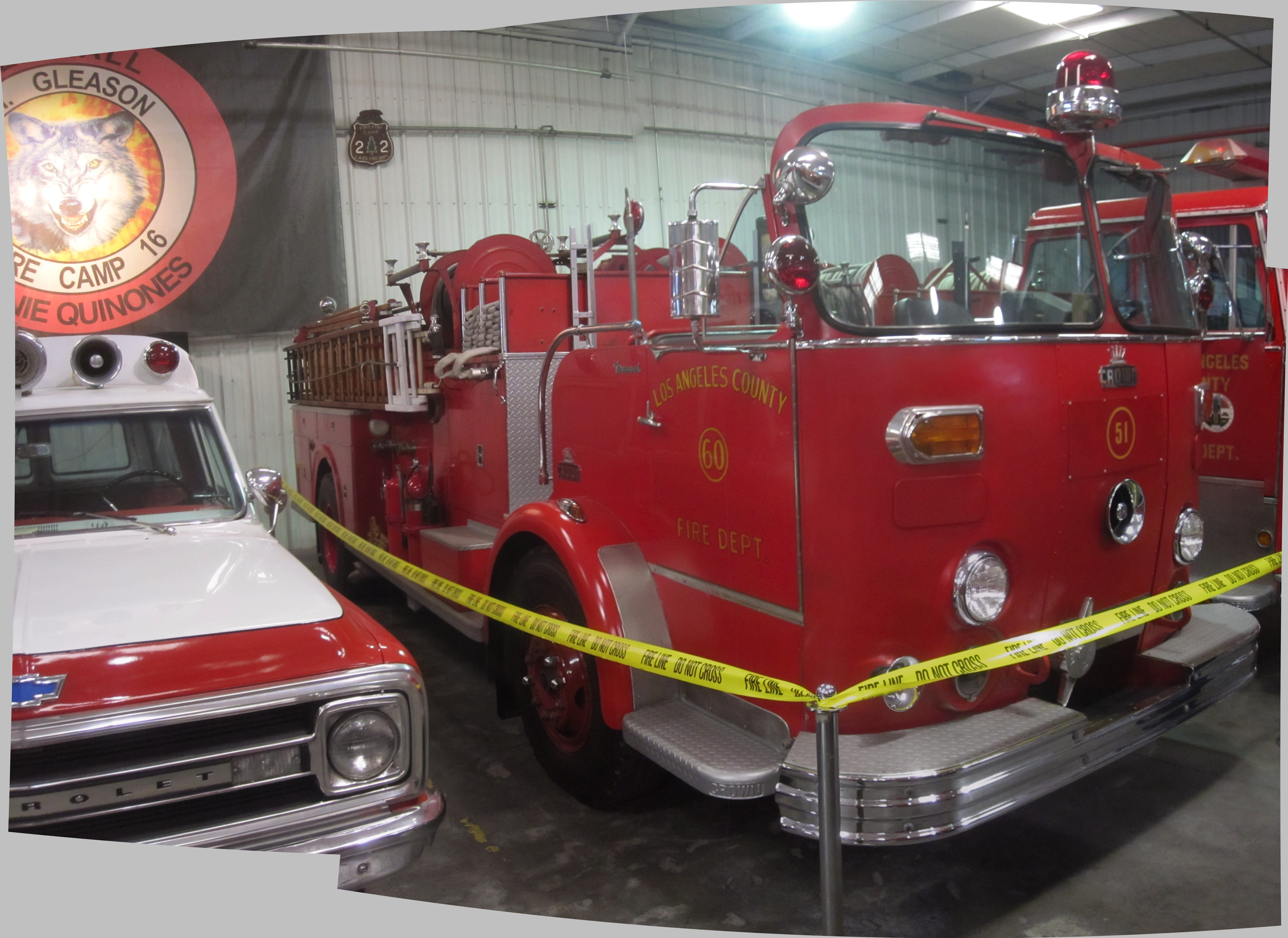
E51 Crown

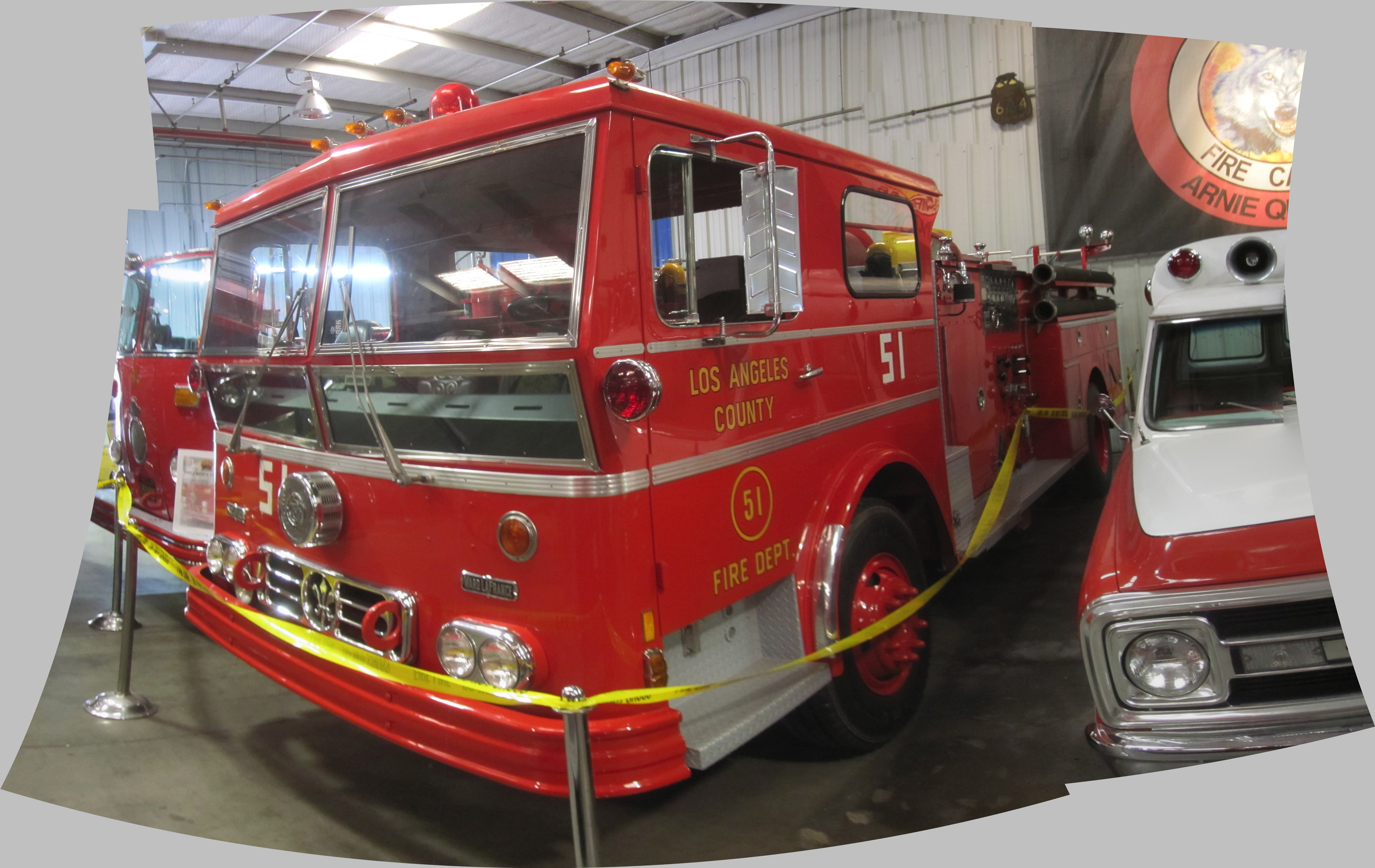
E51 Ward LaFrance

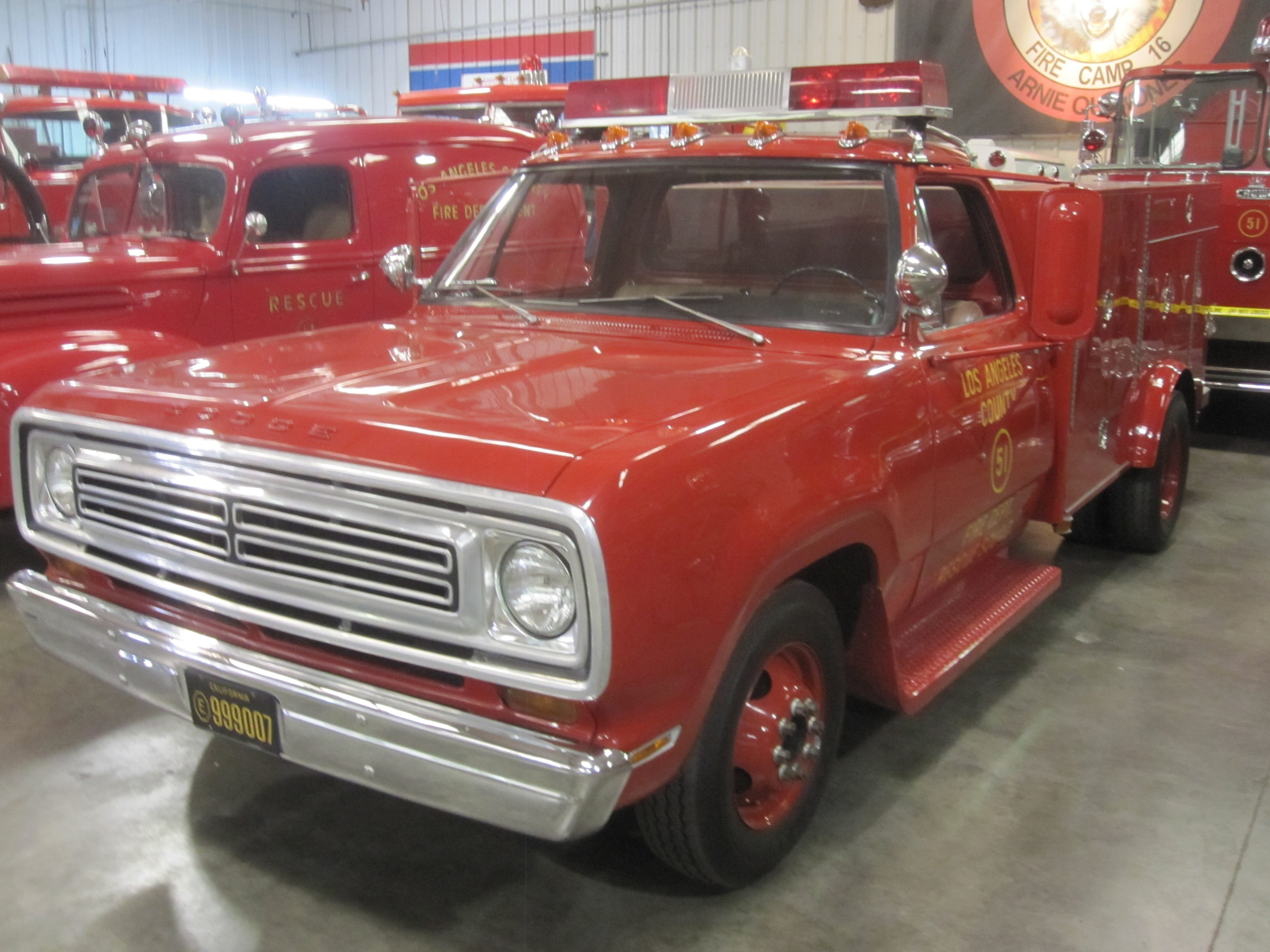
Squad 51 at the museum

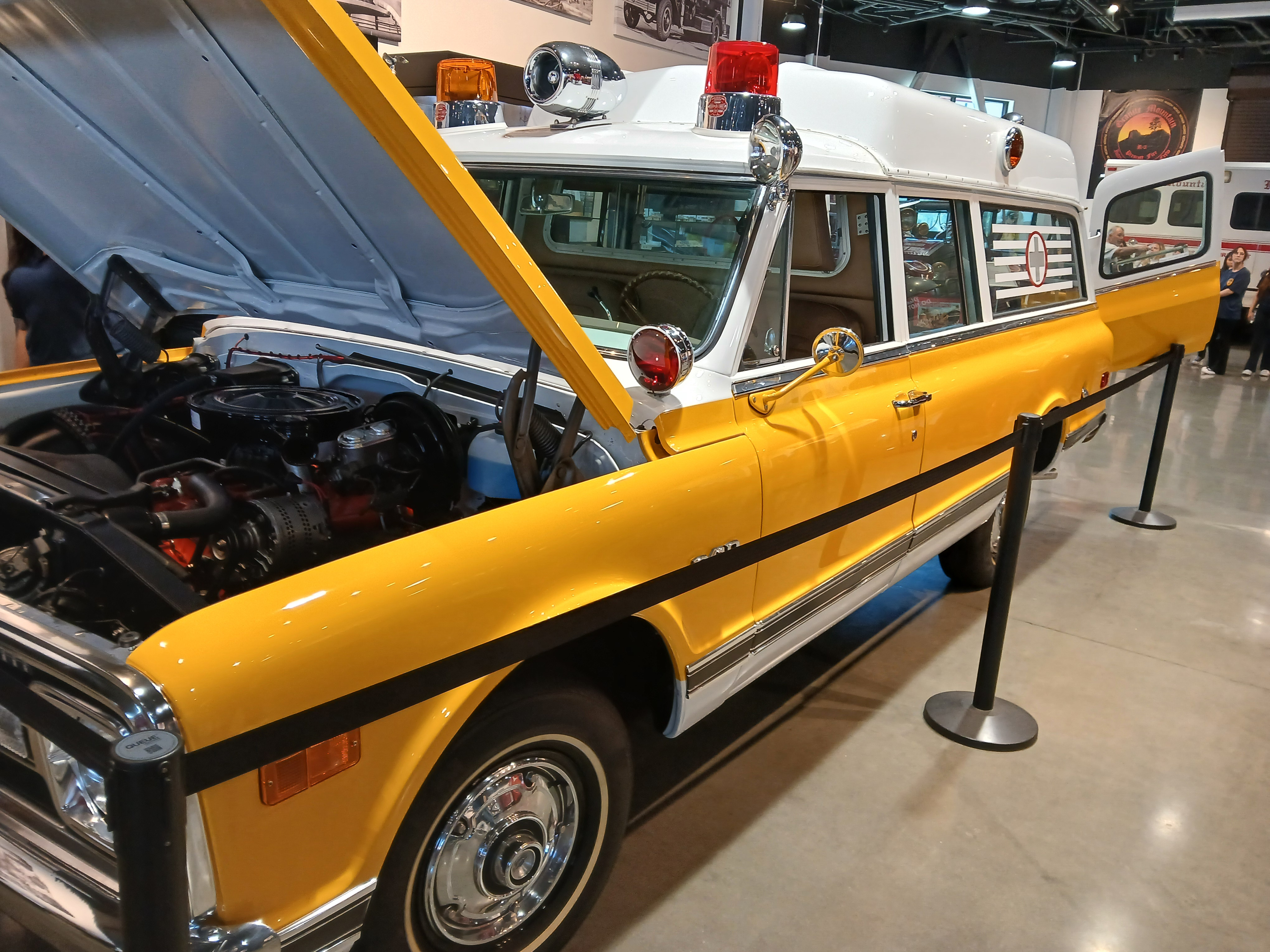
1969 Chevrolet Suburban ambulance

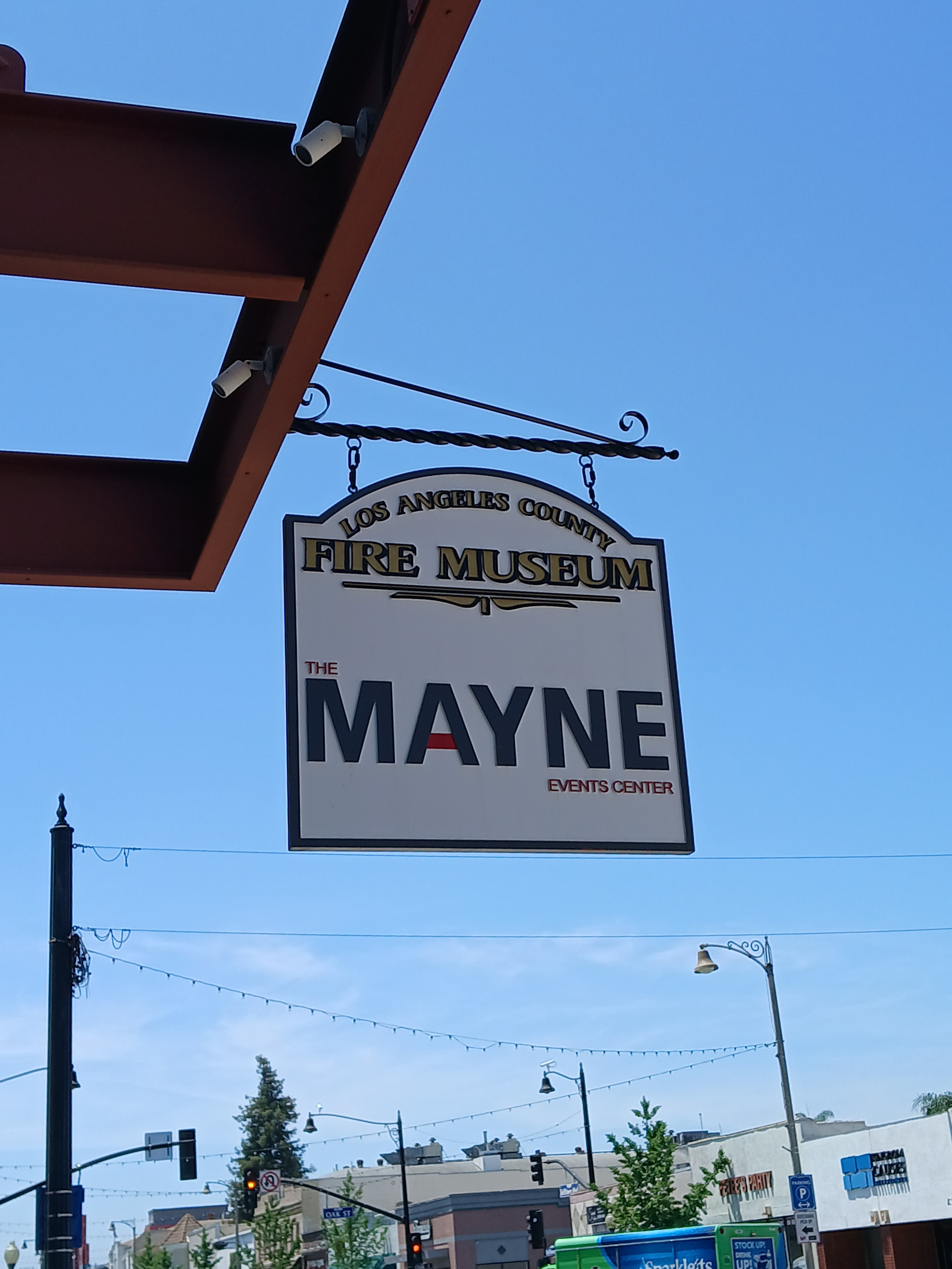

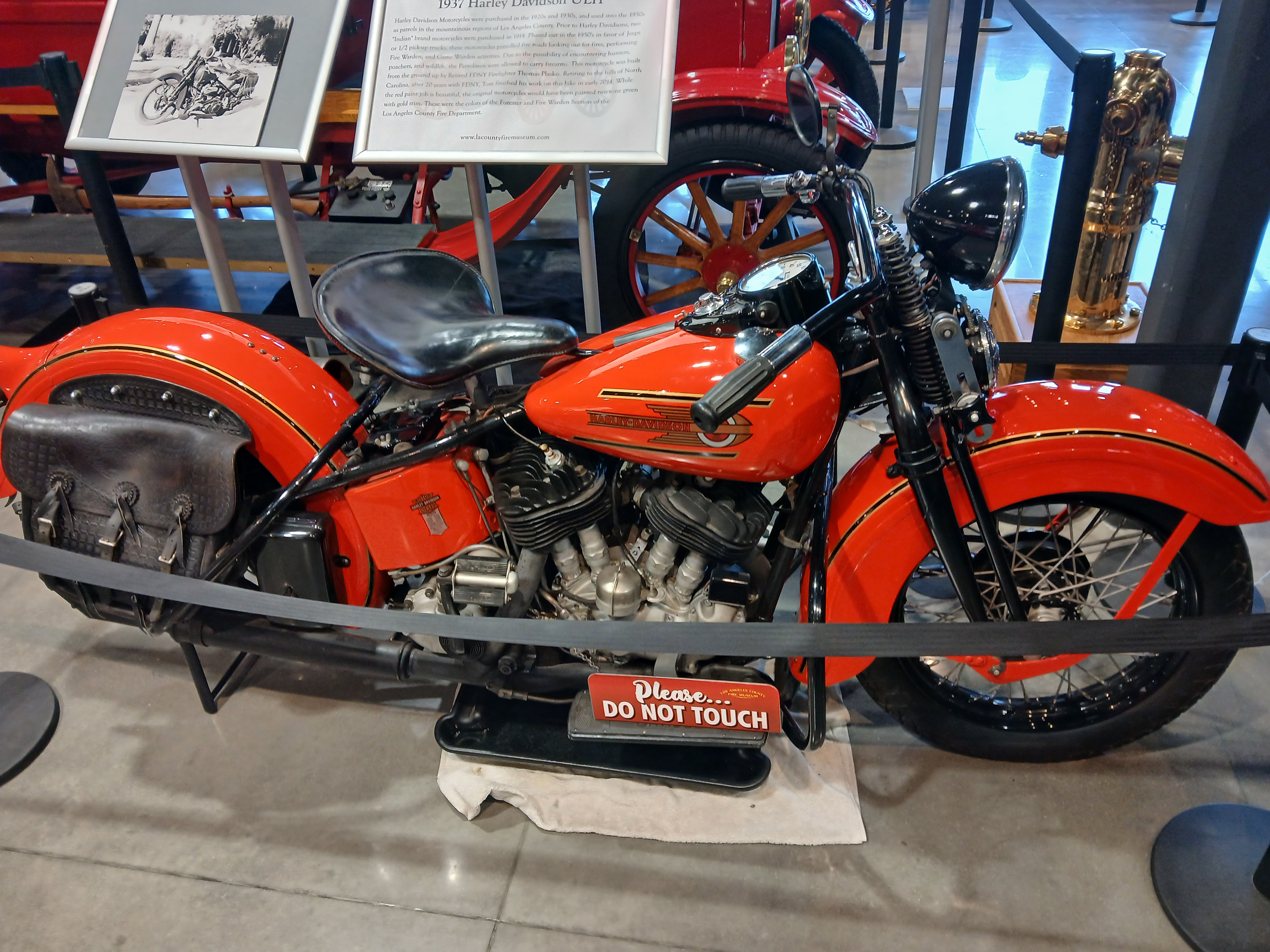
1937 Harley-Davidson ULH Fire Patrol Flathead motorcycles

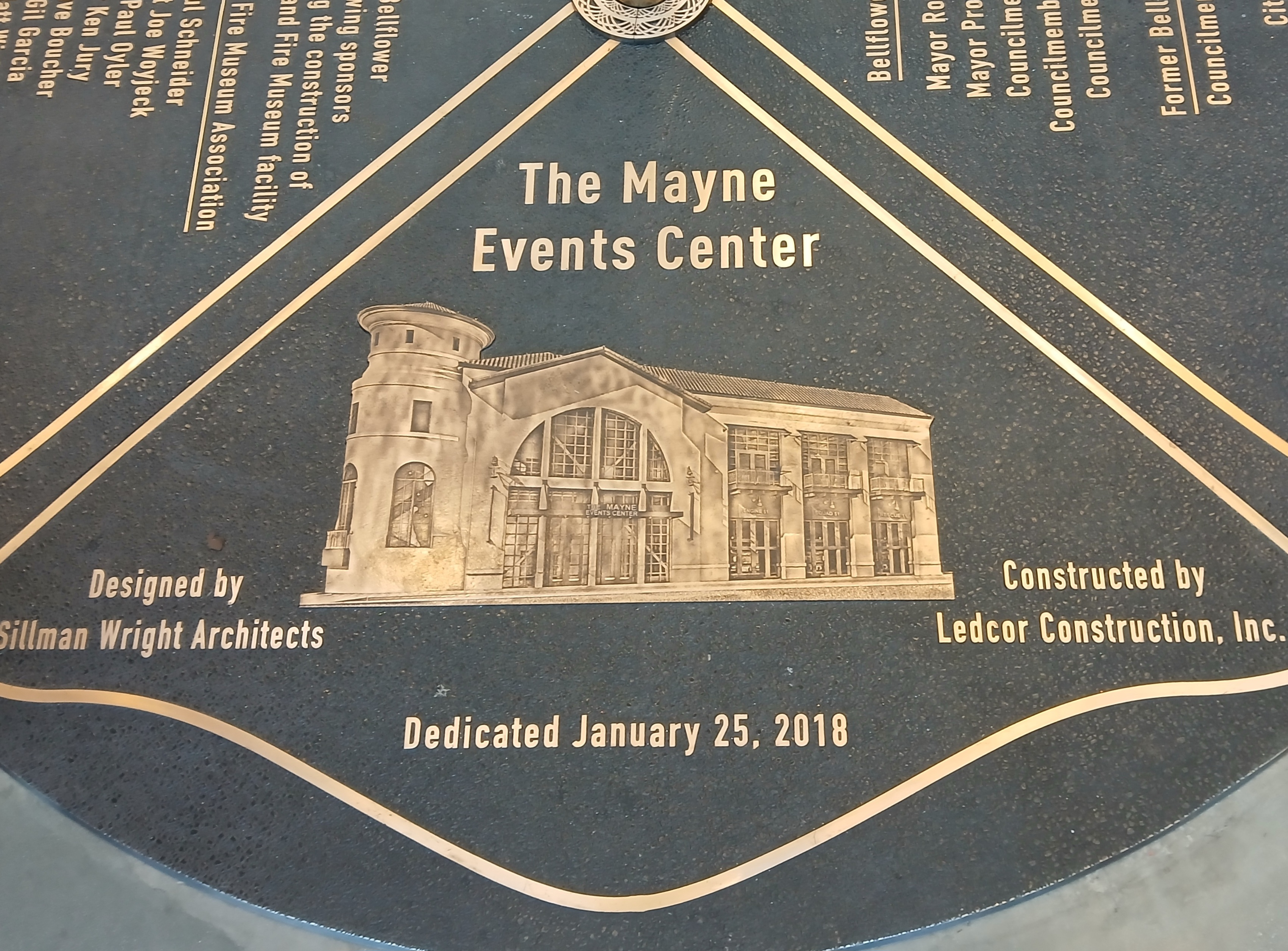
