= Tim Donnelly (actor) =

American film and television actor (1944–2021)

- Born: Timothy David Donnelly; September 3, 1944; Los Angeles, California, U.S.
- Died: September 17, 2021 (aged 77); Santa Fe, New Mexico, U.S.
- Occupation: Actor
- Years active: 1957–1984
- Children: 1

Timothy David Donnelly (September 3, 1944 – September 17, 2021) was an American film and television actor. He was best known for playing the role of fireman Chet Kelly in NBC's Emergency!.

== Life and career ==
Donnelly was born in Los Angeles on September 3, 1944, as the son of Eileen, a homemaker and Paul, an assistant director. He began his career in 1957, appearing in the film Baby Face Nelson. Later in his career, Donnelly appeared in films and television programs, as his credits include Hawaii Five-O, The Secret of Santa Vittoria, Adam-12, CHiPs, The Legend of Jesse James and The Virginian. He also appeared in Dragnet for five episodes, in which he was mentored by Jack Webb.

In 1971, Donnelly was selected for the role of fireman Chet Kelly in Emergency! without an audition. Along with Marco Lopez (who, like Donnelly, won his part of "Marco" without auditioning), was already well known to the creators of Emergency! having acted in other Mark VII shows. After the series ended in 1977, he played starring roles in films Parts: The Clonus Horror and his brother's (Dennis Donnelly's) 1978 film The Toolbox Murders. Donnelly retired from acting in 1984, last appearing in the action-adventure television series The A-Team.

== Death ==
Donnelly died from complications of surgery at his home in Santa Fe, New Mexico, on September 17, 2021, at the age of 77.
