= Emergency! =

American medical drama television series (1972–1977)

- Also known as: Emergency One!
- Created by: Robert A. Cinader; Harold Jack Bloom; Jack Webb
- Starring: Robert Fuller; Julie London; Bobby Troup; Randolph Mantooth; Kevin Tighe; Tim Donnelly; Mike Stoker; Marco Lopez; Michael Norell; Ron Pinkard; Vince Howard
- Theme music composer: Nelson Riddle
- Composers: Nelson Riddle; Billy May
- No. of seasons: 6
- No. of episodes: 122 + 6 TV movies (list of episodes)

Production
- Executive producers: Jack Webb; Robert A. Cinader; Hannah Louise Shearer
- Producers: Robert A. Cinader; Edwin Self; William Stark
- Editor: Richard Belding
- Running time: approx. 50 minutes
- Production companies: Mark VII Limited; Universal Television

Original release
- Network: NBC
- Release: January 15, 1972 – May 28, 1977

Related
- Sierra; Adam-12; Emergency +4

Emergency! is an American action-adventure medical drama television series jointly produced by Mark VII Limited and Universal Television. Debuting on NBC as a midseason replacement on January 15, 1972, replacing two situation comedy series, The Partners and The Good Life, it ran for a total of 122 episodes until May 28, 1977, with six additional two-hour television films in 1978 and 1979.

The show's ensemble cast stars Randolph Mantooth and Kevin Tighe as two rescuers, who work as paramedics and firefighters in the Los Angeles metropolitan area. The duo formed Squad 51, a medical and rescue unit of the Los Angeles County Fire Department, working together with the fictional Rampart General Hospital medical staff (portrayed by Robert Fuller, Julie London and Bobby Troup), and with the firefighter engine company at Station 51.

Emergency! was produced by Jack Webb and created by Robert A. Cinader, who had also created the police dramas Adam-12 and Dragnet. Harold Jack Bloom is also credited as a creator; Webb does not receive screen credit as a creator. In the show's original TV-movie pilot, Webb was credited only as its director. However, the series aimed to be much more realistic than its predecessors as it portrayed emergency medical services (EMS). Pioneering EMS leader James O. Page served as a technical advisor, and the two main actors underwent some paramedic training.

The series aired at a time when ambulance coverage in the United States was rapidly expanding and changing, and the role of a paramedic was emerging as a profession, and it is credited with popularizing the concepts of EMS and paramedics in American society, and even inspiring other states and municipalities to expand the service.

Nearly 30 years after Emergency! debuted, the Smithsonian Institution accepted Emergency! memorabilia into its National Museum of American History's public-service section, including the firefighters' helmets, turnouts, Biophone, and defibrillator. The vehicles of Station 51 are a part of the collection of the Los Angeles County Fire Museum.

== Cast ==
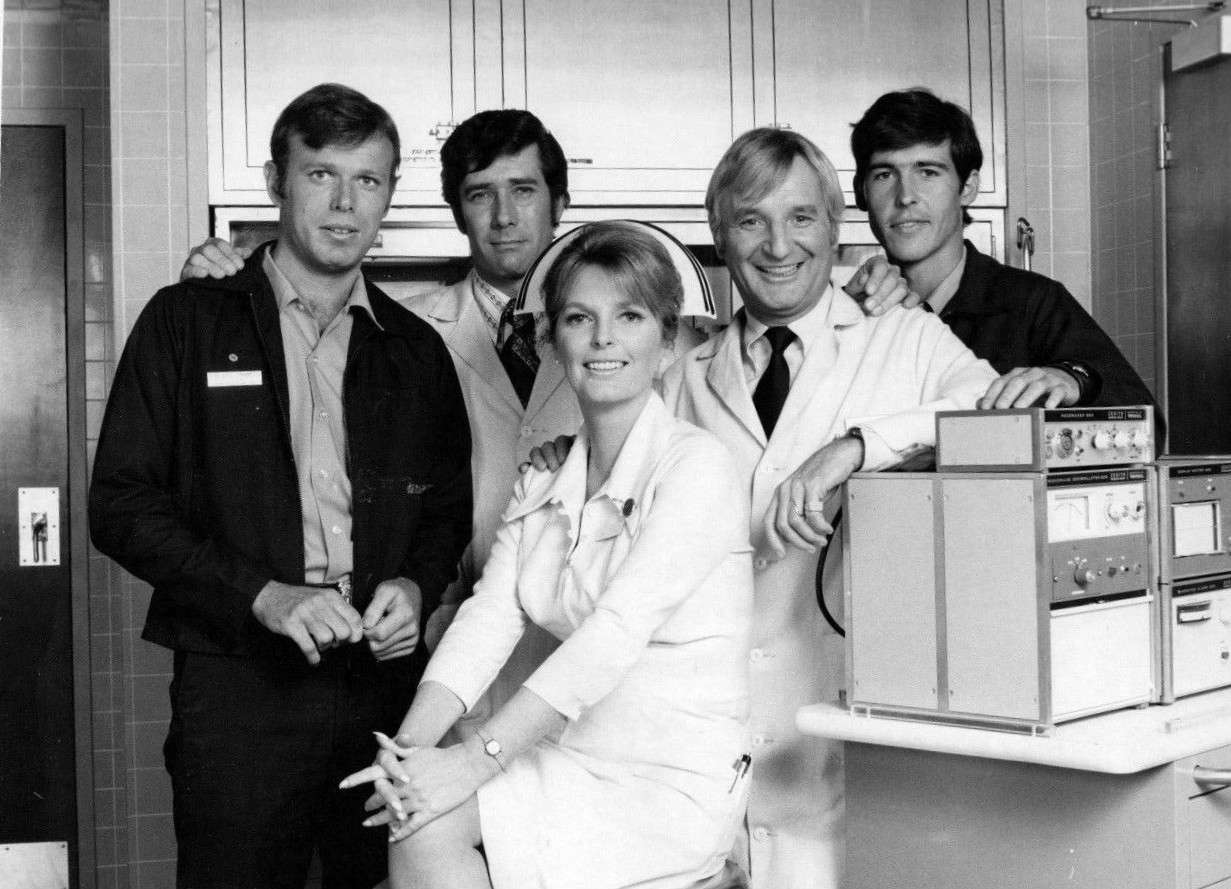
Cast of TV's Emergency! (1973), L-R: Kevin Tighe, Robert Fuller, Julie London, Bobby Troup and Randolph Mantooth

Set at the fictional Fire Station 51 of the Los Angeles County Fire Department, where one fire engine and the paramedic rescue squad are stationed, the series focuses on two young firefighter-paramedics: young and immature John Roderick "Johnny" Gage (Randolph Mantooth), who is always unlucky in love, and more mature family man Roy DeSoto (Kevin Tighe), who crew the rescue squad, Squad 51, and, in addition to providing emergency medical care, perform technical rescues such as vehicle extrication.

The paramedics are supervised by the emergency room (ER) staff of Rampart General Hospital: head physician Dr. Kelly Brackett (Robert Fuller), head nurse Dixie McCall (Julie London), neurosurgeon Dr. Joe Early (played by London's real-life husband Bobby Troup), and young intern Dr. Michael "Mike" Morton (Ron Pinkard, though in the early episodes he portrayed a character named Dr. Thomas Gray).

Other regular characters are the firefighters of Station 51's "A" shift, Chester B. "Chet" Kelly (played by Tim Donnelly) and Marco Lopez (played by actor Marco Lopez). Mike Stoker, a Los Angeles County Fire Department firefighter specialist, drove Engine 51. Los Angeles County Fire Department Dispatcher Samuel Lanier portrayed himself in an uncredited voice role (over the radio) throughout the series, and he is also occasionally shown in a brief clip at the dispatch office just before a dispatch is heard in later seasons; he retired from the department shortly after Emergency! finished. Lopez speaks Spanish, and occasionally translated for the crew when a victim or onlooker spoke Spanish but no English. Unusually, Lopez, Stoker, and Dick Hammer play characters named after themselves.

Various characters held the rank of Captain throughout the series. These include Captain Dick Hammer (Los Angeles County Fire Department Captain Richard Hammer as himself for first season/episodes 1–9, then later John Smith for the last two episodes of the season); Captain Hank Stanley (Michael Norell, during the remaining seasons); and Captain Gene "Captain Hook" Hookrader in a couple of later episodes. Actor John Anderson portrayed Captain Bob Roberts in one Season 4 episode, "Smoke Eater".

Other recurring characters include Battalion Chiefs Conrad (Art Balinger), Sorensen (Art Gilmore), Miller, and McConnike (William Boyett), Firefighter Conway / Firefighter Paramedic Tom Wheeler / Animal Control Supervisor Walt Marsh (Gary Crosby), Los Angeles County Sheriff's Deputy/Carson Police Officer/Sergeant Vince (Vince Howard), and recurring ambulance attendants Albert "Al" (Angelo DeMeo) and his assistant, George (George Orrison). Boyett and Crosby regularly appeared as Sergeant MacDonald and Officer Ed Wells respectively on Adam-12, while Gilmore appeared on that show as watch commander Lieutenant Moore, a recurring character.

- Robert Fuller as Kelly Brackett, M.D., F.A.C.S., A.C.E.P., chief of emergency medicine
- Julie London as Dixie McCall, R.N., chief nurse of the emergency room
- Bobby Troup as Joe Early, M.D., F.A.C.S., A.C.E.P.
- Ron Pinkard as Mike Morton, M.D. (identified in the cast of the pilot as "Dr. Tom Gray", also an intern—the two characters never appeared together).
- Randolph Mantooth as Firefighter Paramedic John Gage, L.A. County FD Squad 51
- Kevin Tighe as Firefighter Paramedic Roy DeSoto, L.A. County FD Squad 51
- Tim Donnelly as Firefighter Chester B. "Chet" Kelly, L.A. County FD Engine 51
- Marco Lopez as Firefighter Marco Lopez, L.A. County FD Engine 51
- Mike Stoker as Firefighter Specialist Mike Stoker, L.A. County FD Engine 51
- Dick Hammer as Captain Dick Hammer (first season only), L.A. County FD Engine 51
- John Smith as Captain Hammer in episode "Hang-Up" 1st season, as Captain in episode "Crash" 1st season, L.A. County FD Engine 51 (The back of this actor's turnout coat reads "Van Orden", but he is never called by name on the show; he is simply referred to as "Captain".)
- Art Balinger as Battalion Chief Conrad
- Art Moore as Battalion Chief
- Michael Norell as Captain Henry "Hank" Stanley, L.A. County FD Engine 51 (after first season)
- James McEachin as Detective Lieutenant Ronald Crockett LAPD.
- Vince Howard as L.A. County Sheriff's Deputy Vince Howard/Carson Police Officer/Sergeant Vince Howard.
- William Boyett as Battalion Chief McConnike (Season 6) Chief Battalion 14
- Sam Lanier (uncredited) as, and providing the voice of, the Los Angeles County Fire Department dispatcher.

The role of Dixie McCall was originally written as a love interest for Fuller's character, Dr. Kelly Brackett, though the on-screen romance between Brackett and McCall was gradually downplayed and eventually ignored over the course of the series; this was explained by Brackett's and McCall's romance not having worked out.

Tim Donnelly and Marco Lopez were hired because Webb and Cinader were very familiar with their work on Dragnet 1967 and Adam-12, where they both appeared in various supporting and featured roles. Lopez was Webb's stand in on Dragnet 1967.

== Development ==
The series was created by Robert Cinader and Jack Webb. Webb had previously created Dragnet, and with Cinader had jointly created Adam-12, both of which were TV series about policing. In 1971, Cinader and Webb met with Captain Jim Page and other officers from the Los Angeles County Fire Department to discuss creating a show about firefighters. Initially they planned to focus the show on physical rescues, but felt that there would not be enough ideas for episodes. Page suggested they look to the Los Angeles County Fire Department's new paramedic program for ideas.

At the time, the Los Angeles area was home to 2 of only 12 paramedic programs in the United States (as opposed to ambulances that provided basic first aid or only transport). In 1970, Governor Ronald Reagan had signed the Wedworth-Townsend Act which allowed paramedic programs to be trialed in Los Angeles County. In September 1971, Cinader and Webb signed a contract with NBC to develop the series. The initial pilot film of Emergency!, titled "The Wedworth-Townsend Act", focuses on the passage of a similar law to the Wedworth-Townsend Act that permits paramedics to operate.

Cinader asked the writers to get all the rescues that were to be portrayed on the show from fire stations' logbooks. Along the same line, the series was technically accurate as every script was fact-checked and approved by the series' technical consultants, Dr. Michael Criley (the man who had initially created the Los Angeles County Fire Department Paramedic program) and Los Angeles County Fire Department Battalion Chief James O. Page. There were always real paramedics serving as technical advisors on set every day for further technical advice.

To train for their parts, the actors, Mantooth and Tighe sat in some paramedic classes (although they never actually took any written exams) and went on extensive ride-alongs with Los Angeles County Fire Department. In an interview with Tom Blixa of WTVN, Mantooth said that the producer wanted them to train so that they would at least know the fundamentals and look like they knew what they were doing on camera. Mantooth mentioned that you needed to take the entire course and pass all the skills stations and final certification exam to be a paramedic, and went on to admit that "if anyone has a heart attack, I'll call 911 with the best of them." Mantooth became an advocate for firefighters and paramedics after the series ended. He continued, as of late October 2014, to give speeches and make appearances all over the country at special events.

== Episodes ==
Season	Episodes	Originally released	
Season	Episodes	First released	Last released
1	11	January 22, 1972	April 15, 1972
2	21	September 16, 1972	April 7, 1973
3	22	September 12, 1973	March 23, 1974
4	22	September 14, 1974	March 1, 1975
5	22	September 13, 1975	March 6, 1976
6	24	September 25, 1976	May 28, 1977
Television films		January 7, 1978	July 3, 1979

== Setting ==
Interior scenes were shot on Universal's sound stages. Exterior scenes of the fire station were shot at Station 127 in Carson, while exterior scenes of the hospital were shot at Harbor General Hospital (now Harbor-UCLA Medical Center).

=== Station 51 ===
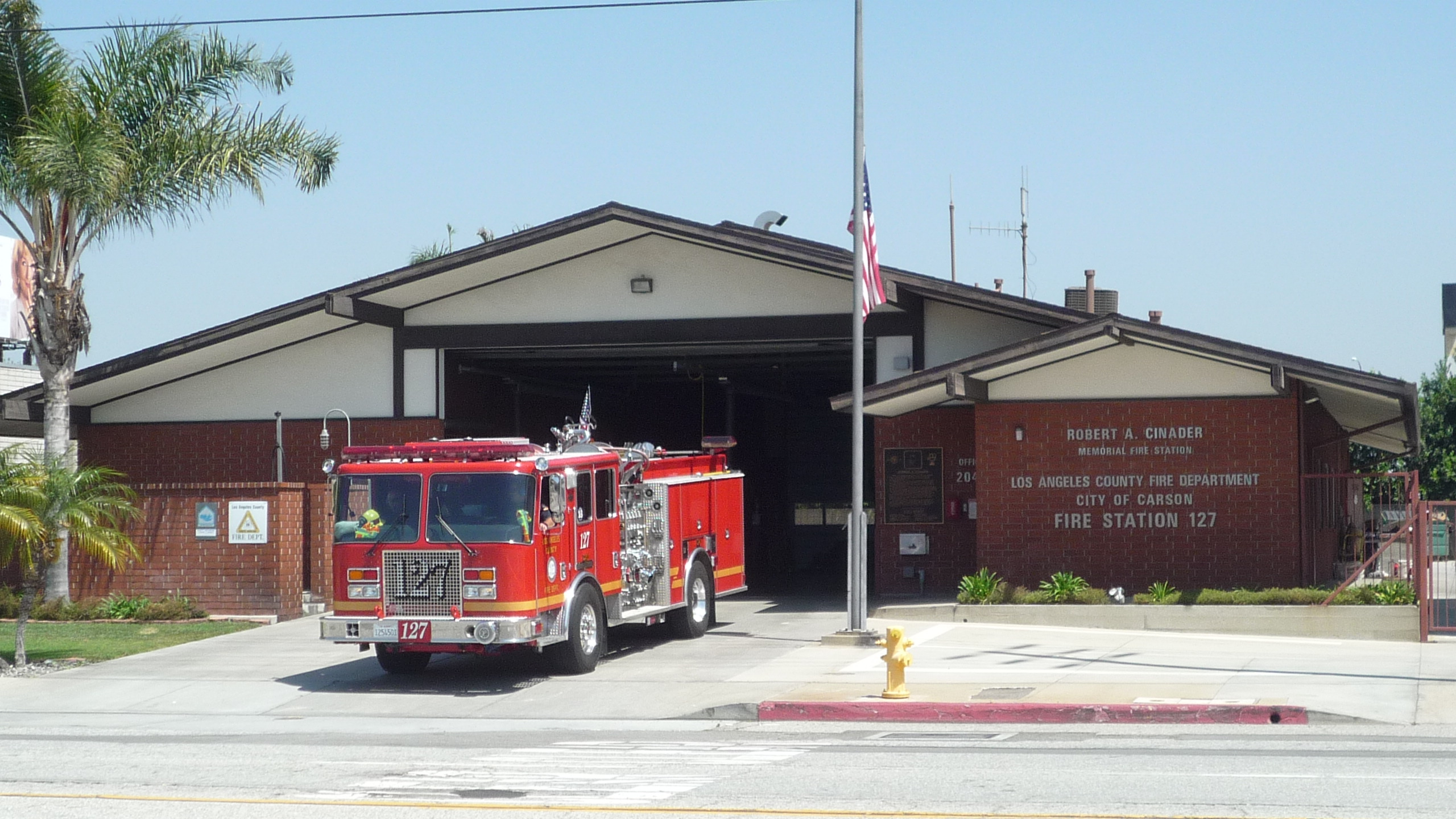
Los Angeles County Fire Station 127 was used to represent Station 51 in the series.(33°49′28″N 118°14′18″W)

Station 51 was represented by Los Angeles Fire Station 127, located at 2049 East 223rd Street [between Wilmington Avenue and Alameda Street, with the San Diego Freeway (I-405) visible in the background in wide shots] in Carson, California.

At the time the series aired, the Los Angeles County Fire Department had no Station 51. It was the number of a station that had previously existed at the intersection of Arlington and Atlantic Avenues on the outskirts of Lynwood and Compton, and closed in the late 1960s when the area was annexed by Lynwood. Since 1994, the Los Angeles County Fire Department has had a Station 51 in a different location. In an homage to the show, the fire station on the grounds of Universal Studios was renumbered from Station 60 to Station 51, more than 20 years after the debut of Emergency!. The vehicles based at Station 60 were accordingly renumbered. This station is therefore home to an actual Engine 51 and Squad 51, as well as Patrol 51 and Quint 51 (apparatus with five principal resources: a truck-mounted aerial ladder, ground ladders, fire pump, water tank, and hose).

Station 127 was chosen by series co-creator Robert A. Cinader, and the station was eventually named in his honor (a plaque honoring Robert A. Cinader is now mounted on the station next to the office front door). Station 106 in Rolling Hills Estates, California, a similar design to 127, was initially the choice, but faced north (versus south), which would make it difficult to light properly. At the time of filming Station 127 housed Engine 127 and Truck 127 (a ladder truck), whereas the fictional Station 51 had a small rescue truck instead of a ladder truck. As of 2018, Station 127 now instead houses Quint 127 and Foam 127.

When filming on location took place, Truck 127 was moved off-site and replaced with Universal's Squad 51, while Engine 127 was disguised as Engine 51. After Universal obtained a 1973 Ward LaFrance to use as Engine 51, both of Station 127's apparatus would be replaced by Universal's Engine 51 and Squad 51 for filming on location. Despite being "kicked out" of their own station for filming, Truck 127 still appeared in numerous episodes under its own callsign. The Carson location of Station 127 was directly referenced in one episode where a phone call was traced to a house "in Carson" that Engine 51 and Squad 51 eventually responded to. Interior scenes at Station 51 were filmed on sets at the studio, which accurately recreated the interior of Station 127.

"KMG365", which is said by the crewmember acknowledging a call for a unit at Station 51, is a real FCC call sign used by Los Angeles County Fire Department assigned to Fire Station 98 in Bellflower, and it appears on the Station Patch for Station 127.

=== Rampart General Hospital ===
In the pilot episode, Rampart General Hospital is shown (in a letter to Dr. Brackett) to be located in Carson, California. At the time of filming, Rampart General Hospital was represented by Harbor General Hospital, located in Torrance, California at 1000 West Carson Street, the intersection of Vermont Avenue and Carson Street (33°49′49″N 118°17′30″W). The pairing of Station 127 and Harbor General as "Station 51" and "Rampart" was accurate, since if a squad had actually been quartered at Station 127, it would likely have operated from Harbor General Hospital, since they are only 2.1 miles (3.4 km) apart. Not accurate was the response area of Station 51. Many examples exist. As seen in season 6 episode 5, where they responded to 4000 N. Riverton Ave. Universal City, Truck 127 appeared in one episode where a rescue event occurred at Rampart (Harbor General), as the hospital really is in Truck 127's "first-due" district.

In an episode near the end of the series, one character, an aged jazz musician, hearing the name Rampart General, says, "My grandaddy used to play on Rampart Street in New Orleans!" The name Rampart actually comes from the show Adam-12 and is the real name of a division of the LAPD.

In 1978, by the approval of the Los Angeles County Board of Supervisors, Harbor General Hospital was renamed as Harbor-UCLA Medical Center.

In 2018, CrowdRx, Inc., launched their Mobile Emergency Room Trailer, naming it "Rampart" to honor Rampart General Hospital.

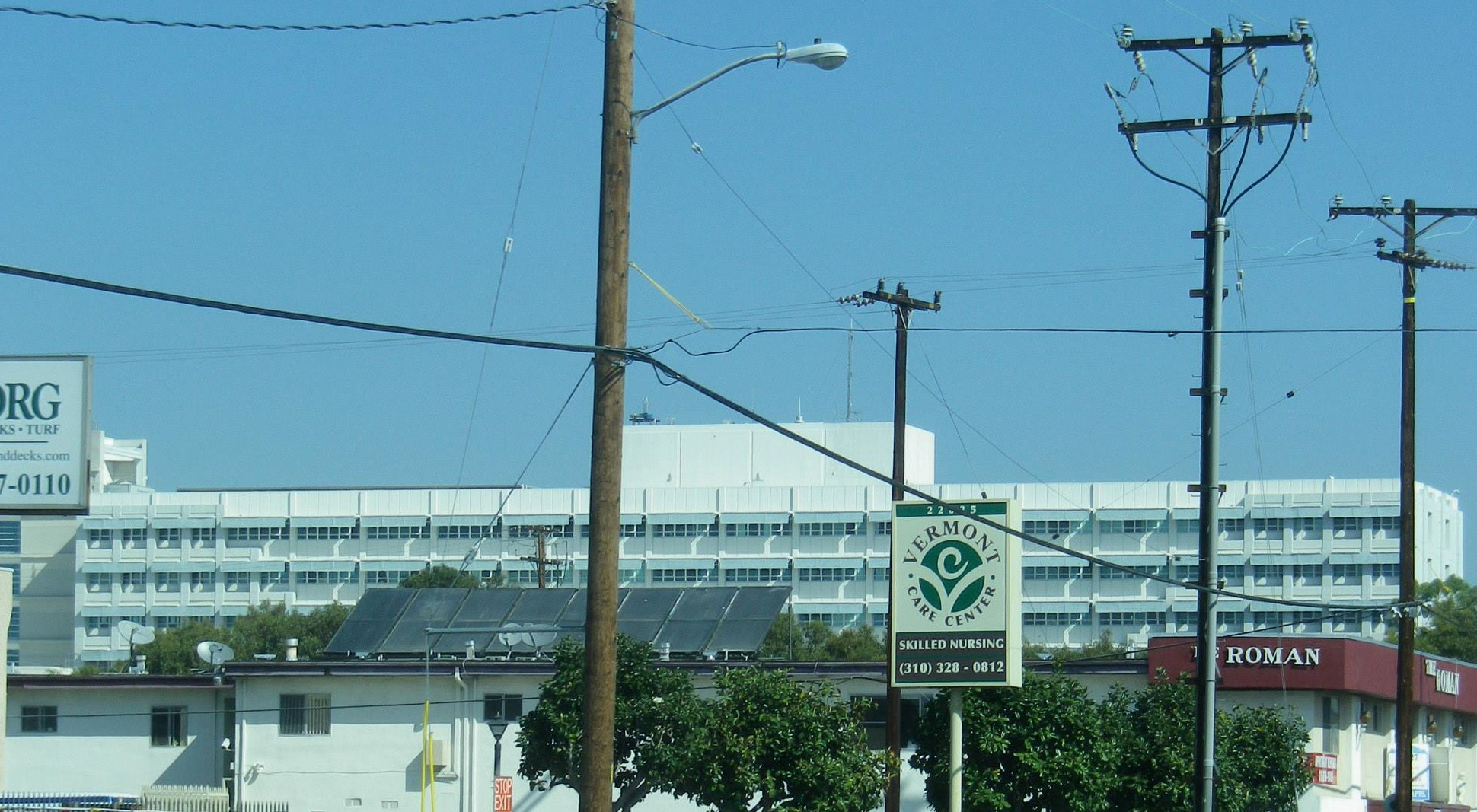
Harbor-UCLA Medical Center; taken Sat. March 28, 2015

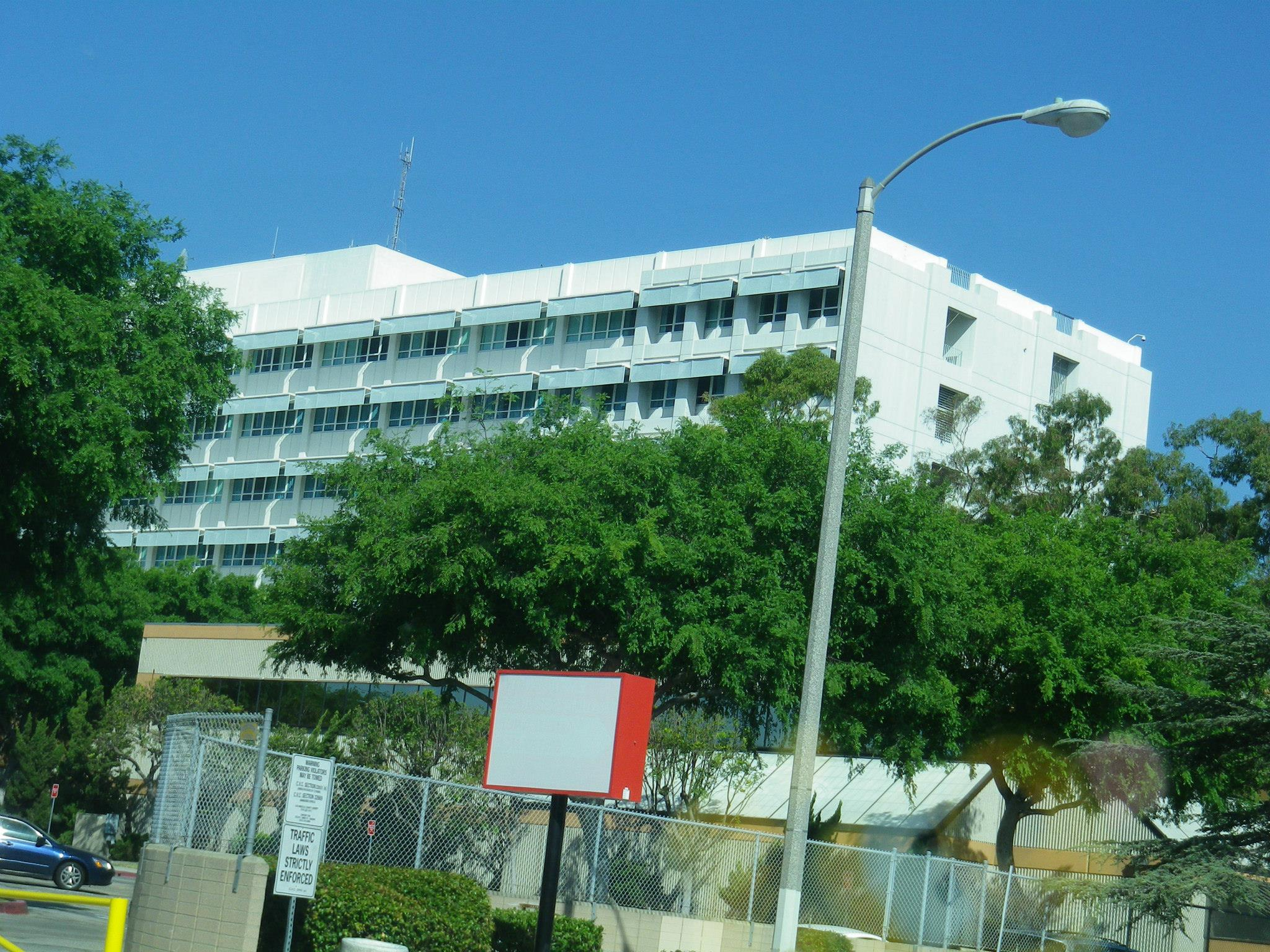
Harbor-UCLA Medical Center; taken Sat. March 28, 2015

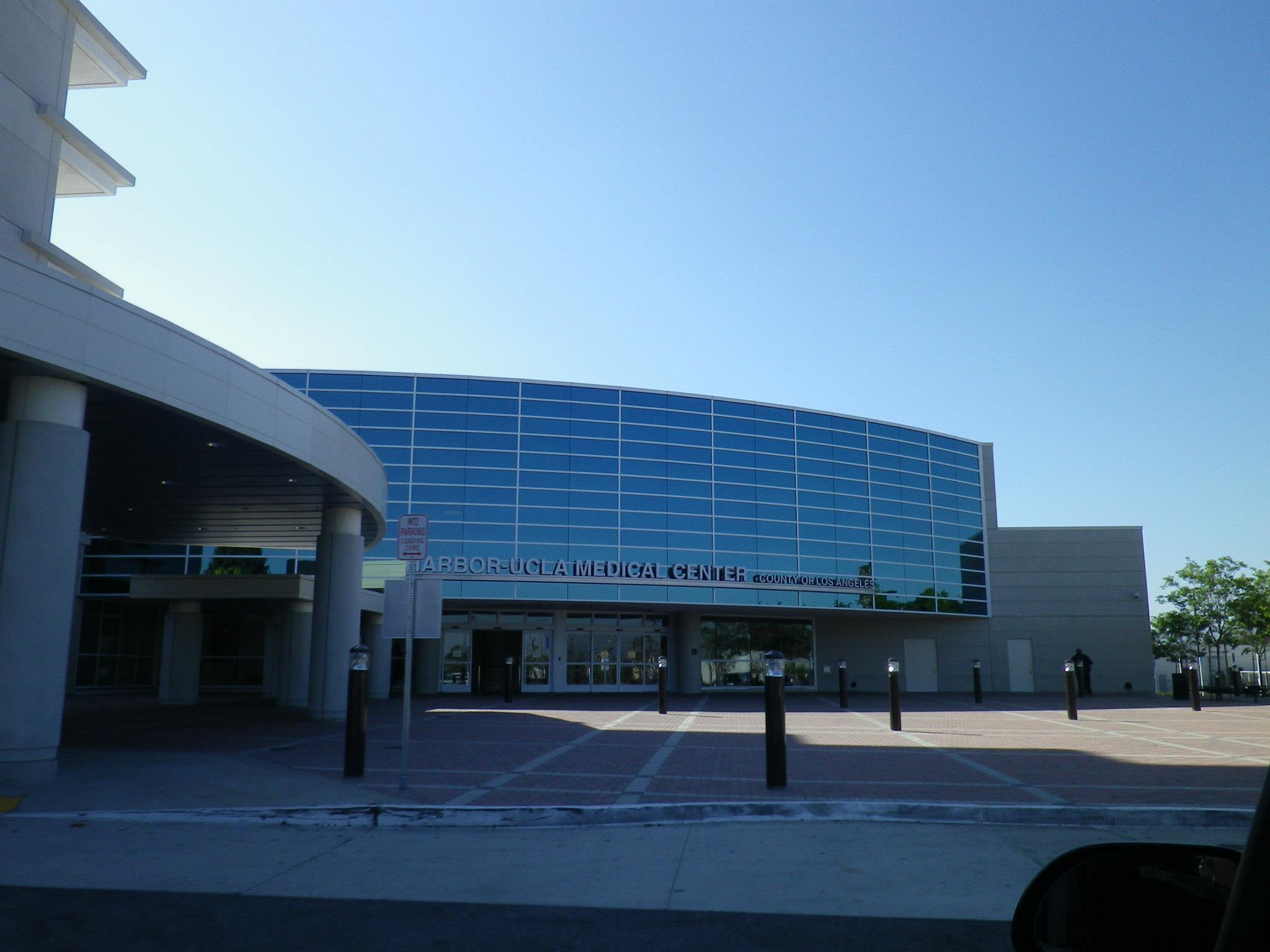
Harbor-UCLA Medical Center; taken Sat. March 28, 2015

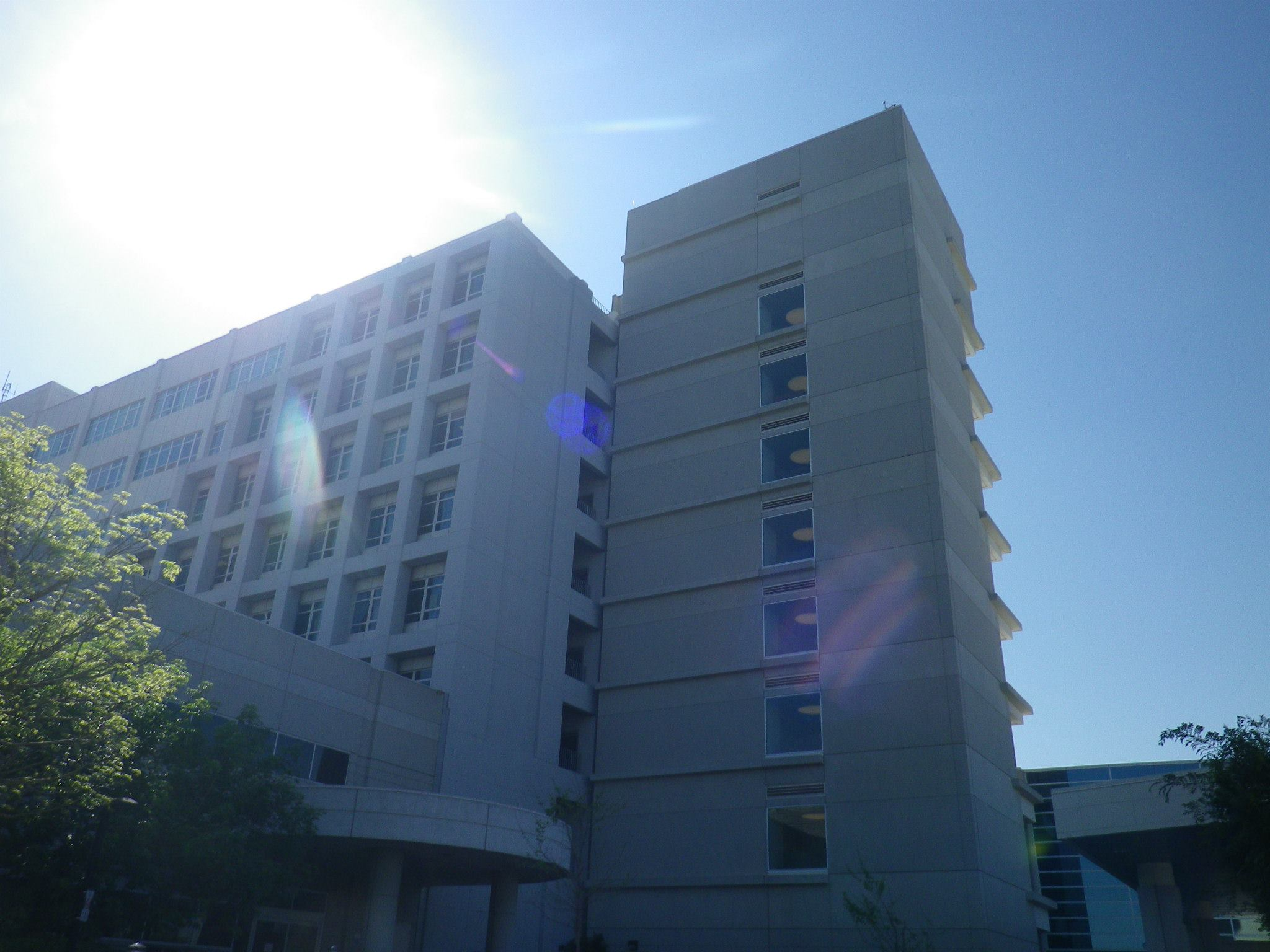
Harbor-UCLA Medical Center; taken Sat. March 28, 2015

=== Los Angeles County Fire Dispatch ===
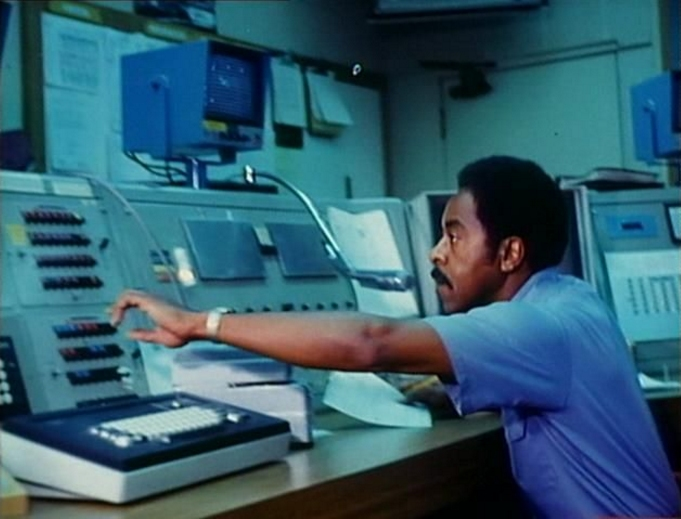
Los Angeles County Fire Department Dispatcher Sam Lanier (uncredited voice of dispatcher). On the left is the Motorola Quik-Call system that created the familiar "alert tones" heard on the show.

Footage of a dispatcher used during the show appears to have been filmed at the Los Angeles County Fire Department Keith E. Klinger dispatch center in East Los Angeles. The screen he looked at to see the street maps is a rear projection from a Kodak Carousel projector built into the console. The man was actual Los Angeles County Fire Department dispatcher Sam Lanier, who also lent his voice as the dispatcher for the series' entire run.

The familiar tones that called Station 51 into service were initiated by dispatch using a Motorola Quik Call I unit, a radio listening on a common paging frequency for a pair of special audio tones assigned to that station. For a large incident, one could often hear many sets of tones calling many stations, but only the tones assigned to Station 51 would sound the buzzer at that station.

A long scene showing the sequence of microfiche reader address lookup to quik-call dispatch appears in the season six episode "Family Ties".

== Props ==
The creators of Emergency! tried to accurately portray the Los Angeles County Fire Department by using apparatus and equipment in current use. The extensive cooperation of the Los Angeles County Fire Department is repeatedly apparent in the program. Although a few key items were fictionalized, such as the identification of Station 51 and its equipment, many of the locations and apparatus reflected the operating reality of locations used in some filming. Nearly 30 years after Emergency! debuted, the Smithsonian Institution accepted Emergency! memorabilia into its National History Museum, public-service section, including their helmets, turnouts, Biophone, and defibrillator.

=== Squad 51 ===
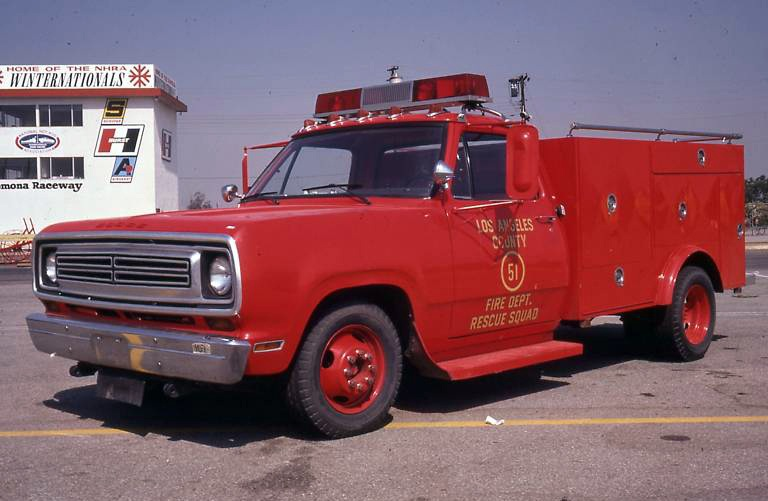
Squad 51 before restoration, picture taken at Pomona Raceway in the 1970s

The vehicles which represented Squad 51 were constructed by Universal crews and were accurate replicas of the units built in-house on stock 1972 Dodge D300 truck chassis by Los Angeles County Fire Department prior to the filming of "Emergency". Three identical truck chassis were used to represent the original TV Squad 51. The Los Angeles County Fire Department shops were unable to fulfill a request from Universal to build the first unit for the show within the short deadline the studio required, but did provide the blueprints so the studio could build its own unit on a 1972 Dodge D300 chassis.

The replica's accuracy is evident in that the white light atop the Federal Signal Twinsonic lightbar was part of the blueprint but was never installed by Los Angeles County Fire Department on its departmental units. This light was intended to be used by other personnel and particularly helicopters to differentiate paramedic squads from regular rescue squads and other units operating that vehicle type. Prior to season 3, the studio acquired a 1973 D300 cab and chassis. All of the external paraphernalia (rear compartment box, lightbar, searchlights, K12 box, etc.) were removed and remounted on the new squad chassis. This vehicle lasted for two seasons. In season 5 the third and final Dodge truck appeared. It was a 1974 model and this is the vehicle that presently resides in the Los Angeles County Fire Department museum. Once again, the rear compartment box and lightbar from the original Squad 51 were remounted. Also, the last two chassis came with a different engine grille, so the parts from the first truck were kept. The whereabouts of the first two stripped-down Dodge D300s remains a mystery. After the filming of the series, at the Fire Department's request, the studio donated the unit to Los Angeles County Fire Department in 1978, which pressed it into occasional service as a reserve unit before it was eventually retired from service.

In 1999, Los Angeles County Fire Department donated the Universal-built squad to the Los Angeles County Fire Museum, which restored it and put it on display.

=== Engine 51 ===
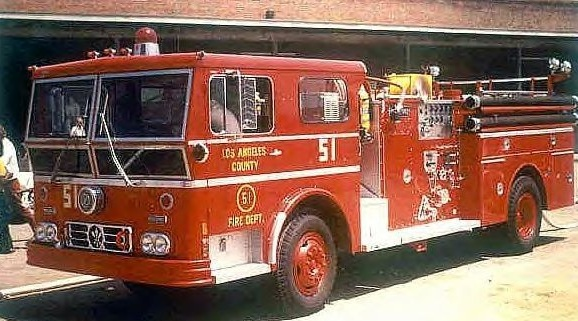
The Engine 51 from Ward La France, shown in a photo shot in the 1970s.

The original Engine 51 was a 1965 open-cab Crown Firecoach, and was represented by Los Angeles County Fire Department Engine 127's 1965 Crown in stock footage at the fire station (in reality Los Angeles County Fire Department Station 127), and by Los Angeles County Fire Department Engine 60's 1965 Crown (the unit assigned to Universal Studios) for filming on the grounds of the studio. In a few instances in the first and second seasons, the regular apparatus borrowed from Los Angeles County Fire Department and used for filming appear to have been unavailable as some scenes show a slightly different vintage Crown Firecoach pumper, most evident by the different style of emergency lights on the cab's roof. As a condition of providing a department pumper for filming, the Los Angeles County Fire Department required one of its own qualified Engineers be used to operate it, active Firefighter Engineer (later Specialist) Mike Stoker, who already possessed a Screen Actors Guild card, was cast in the series. The mixing of stock station and response footage with footage filmed for specific storylines created continuity errors by mixing these apparatus.

Early in the third season, Engine 51 was represented by a 1973 closed-cab Ward LaFrance P80 Ambassador triple-combination pumper. Los Angeles County Fire Department was purchasing numerous P80s at the time, and Ward LaFrance, through their local distributor, Albro Fire Equipment Co. of Los Angeles, donated a P80 unit to Universal Studios specifically for use in the series as product placement. The Ward LaFrance Engine 51 was thus not a disguised unit and did not require the use of Los Angeles County Fire Department resources for filming.

Engine 127's 1965 Crown, one of the two originally used for the series, was later refitted with a closed cab. Eventually it was placed into reserve status when Station 127 received a new engine. In its reserve capacity, it was serving temporarily as Engine 95 when it was involved in a collision. Damaged beyond repair in the collision, it was salvaged for parts and sold as scrap. The County of Los Angeles Fire Museum Association now owns and has restored the 1965 Crown which formerly served as Engine 60 at Universal Studios and appeared most often as the Crown version of Engine 51.

The Ward LaFrance P80 Ambassador that represented Engine 51, owned by the studio outright, made its final Emergency! appearance in the movie The Steel Inferno, but it was marked as Engine 110. The Ward remained at Universal Studios as a prop following the conclusion of the series, and made brief appearances such as in the film The China Syndrome (1979) and a short educational film produced by the National Fire Protection Association in 1984. Eventually, the Ward was pressed into active duty at Yosemite National Park, as MCA Recreation Services (Universal's then-owner/operator) was under contract to provide visitor services at the park at the time, and it remained with YNP Fire after MCARS's involvement at the Park ended.

As the fire department for the concession area was private (and not state or federal), the engine had the California personalized (vanity) license plate YCS E51. It served continuously as YNP Fire's Engine 7 until it was retired and replaced in July 2008. Per terms of a previous agreement between the Park and the County of Los Angeles Fire Museum Association, the museum assumed ownership of the Ward and added it to the museum collection. In 2012, the museum finished a complete restoration of the Ward to its original appearance in the show.

Both of Station 51's vehicles have also been immortalized as Hot Wheels diecast vehicles Emergency Squad (1998) and Fire-Eater (1977) respectively.

=== Antique Dennis fire engine ===
An antique fire engine was the subject of three episodes of the show. In the third season, episode 2, entitled, "The Old Engine", Gage and DeSoto see a derelict fire engine in a scrap yard during a fire. They purchase the vehicle for $80 according to the script and attempt to restore it. The script says it is a 1932 Dennis fire engine, but the vehicle is a Dennis Ace model, manufactured from 1934 to 1939 and sold to the British market, including Australia, New Zealand, and India. Records indicate this model was not sold in the US.

In Season 4, Episode 13, "The Parade", the two paramedics have finished their restoration of the Dennis Ace fire engine for the California Firefighters Parade, though having to replace a part that just broke. En route to the parade, wearing antique uniforms, the two spot an apartment fire and respond in the engine using its antiquated equipment to rescue two people trapped in the building before Los Angeles County Fire Department arrives. The Dennis Ace is heavily damaged when the structure collapses onto it. In Season 5, Episode 2, "The Old Engine Cram" the main characters are informed by Nurse McCall that a man is looking to buy that same model of fire engine. Unfortunately, the engine is mistakenly referred to in the script as a 1923 Paige when it is actually a Dennis.

=== Equipment ===
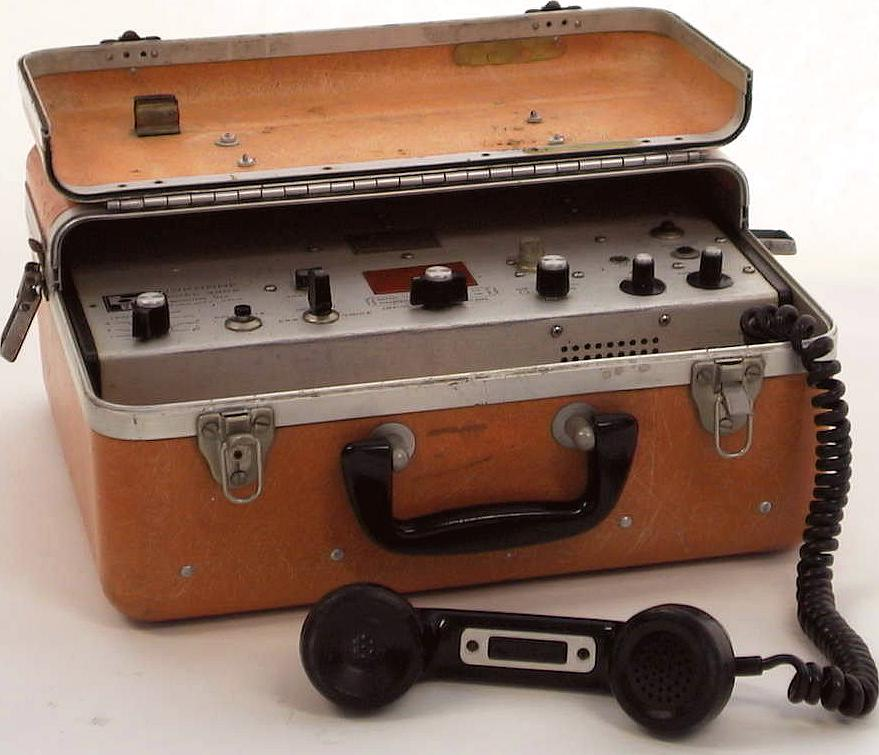
The original Emergency! Biophone Model 3502

The orange radio Gage and DeSoto used was a model 3502 Biocom Biophone. It came in an orange fiberglass case and was fully portable. It could transmit EKG and voice, could be charged in 15 minutes, and had one hour of talking time. The radio had eight duplex UHF channels and a total of 12 watts of transmitting power. There were two Biophones used on the series, one smaller than the other.

In "Survival on Charter #220", Gage and DeSoto are briefly seen using a Motorola Apcor, with Dr. Early and Nurse McCall using a Motorola base station back at Rampart.

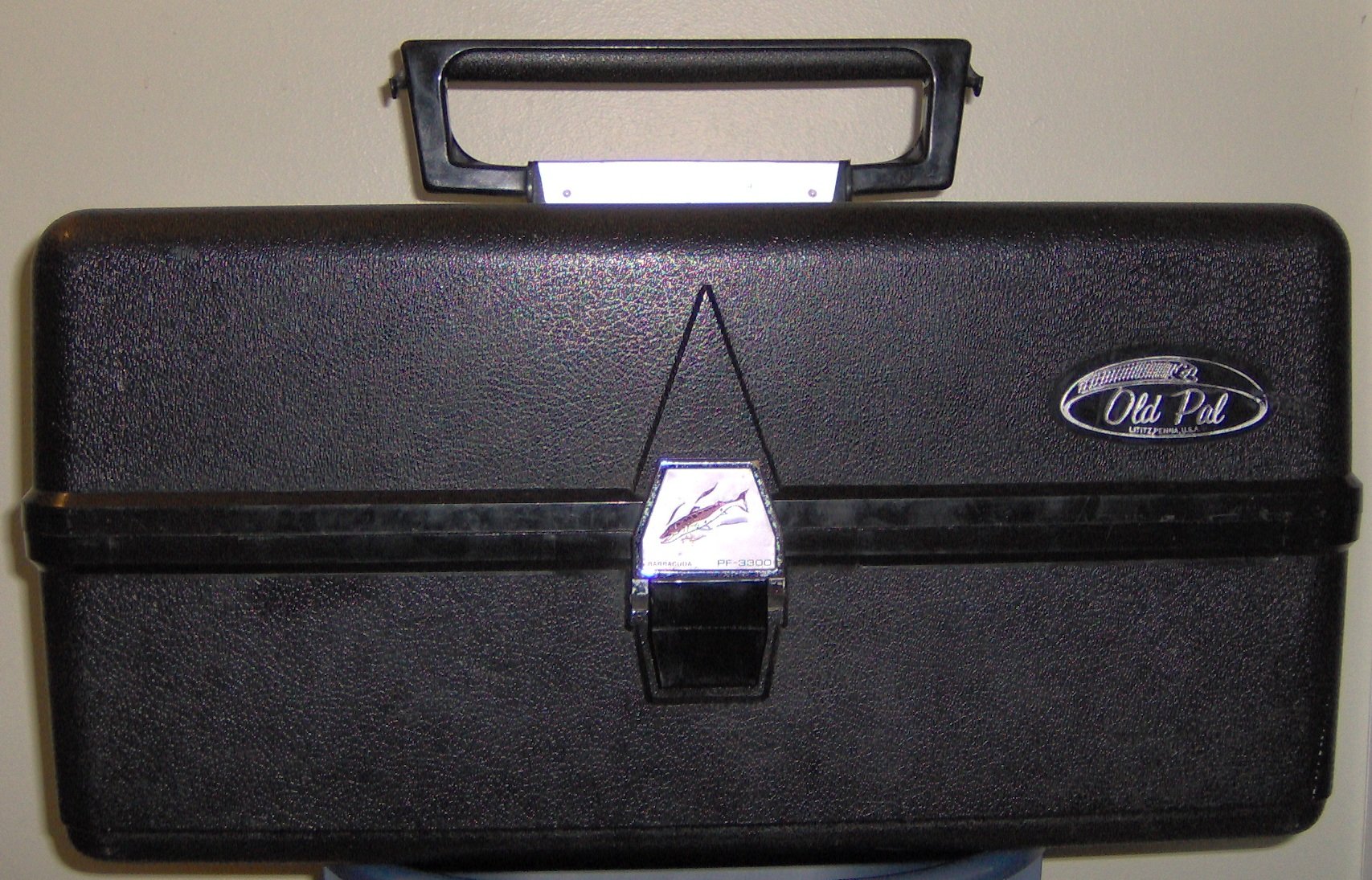
Old Pal Tackle Box PF-3300: AKA Drug Box, Emergency!

The electrocardiograph (ECG or EKG) machine used in the show was a Datascope Model 850 Dual Trace Physiological Monitor. This model came out in 1971 and was the first portable, battery rechargeable unit of its kind. Its original price was $2,000. In the middle of Season 4, the show switched to a Datascope MD/2, which was a combined monitor and defibrillator that allowed the monitor unit to slide out. With the monitor docked, it can read and display an EKG through the defibrillator paddles; this function is shown several times during the series, and anticipates the development of the automated external defibrillator, only a few years later. The paramedics also carried some medical equipment in a black model PF-3300 Old Pal tackle box, commonly used by the fire department at the time. There were instances when the actors encountered difficulty in pronouncing medical terms correctly, so some scenes show the characters from the back or behind a mask, which allowed them to dub in the correct pronunciations at a later time.

Many items of the equipment were donated to the Smithsonian Institution's National Museum of American History in May 2000.

The protective clothing ("turn-out gear") that the firefighters wore, including the MSA Topgard helmets, as well as nearly all other equipment such as insignia, were standard fire department issue at the time.

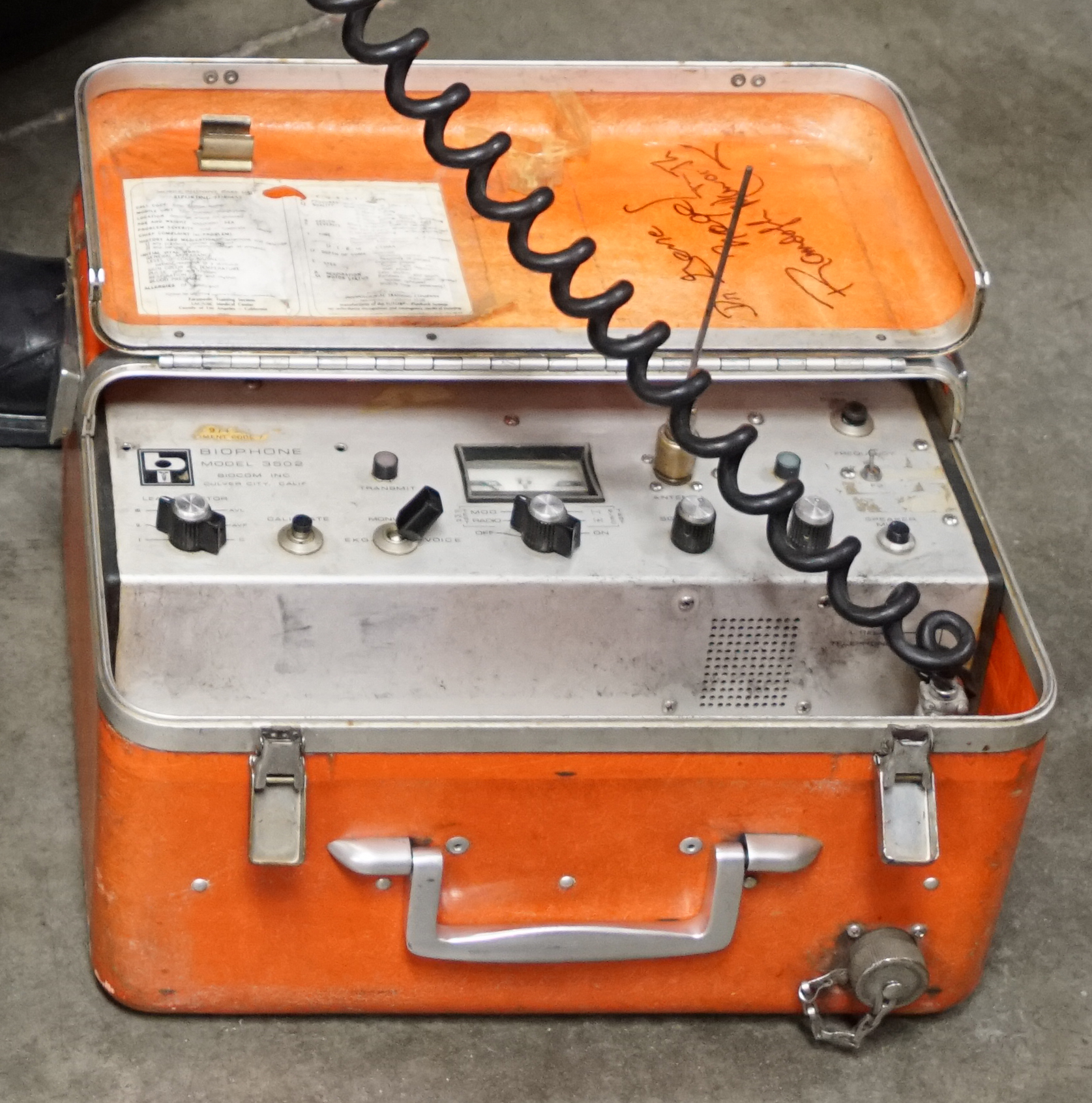
Possibly the actual Biophone used in the show. This is the unit on display at the Los Angeles County Fire Department fire museum. This unit has a connection port in the front that can be seen on screen. The above model does not.

The badges used in the series were authentic fire department badges. At the end of filming each day, they were collected, stored for safekeeping and then reissued the next day.

== Legacy ==
=== Impact on emergency medical services ===
An analysis of Emergency!'s influence on the rapid expansion of paramedic services must begin with the acknowledgement of the familiar adage that "correlation does not equal causation." ... However, ample evidence supports a conclusion that the TV show was a primary factor that fueled the legal changes that allowed paramedic services to develop and expand.

— Paul Bergman, University of Baltimore Law Review, 2007

Before Emergency!, ambulances had been operating for decades in the United States. However, their crews rarely had training beyond basic first aid. Most states did not license them to perform more advanced medical treatment. The alternative was to staff ambulances with traditional healthcare professionals like doctors, which was expensive and posed recruitment challenges.

Writing in the University of Baltimore Law Review in 2007, Paul Bergman argued that Emergency! encouraged the growth of EMS. The conclusion is shared by Yokey and Sutherland in the book Emergency! Behind the Scenes. Bergman acknowledges that some of this trend had already been in motion, due to developments such as the 1966 report Accidental Death and Disability: The Neglected Disease of Modern Society and California's Wedworth-Townsend Act in 1970. In 1971, there were only 12 paramedic services operating in the United States. In the first three years that Emergency! aired, 46 out of 50 states enacted laws that allowed paramedics to practice. On a federal level, the 1974 Emergency Medical Services Systems Act was enacted to encourage the trend. By 1982, half of the American population was within ten minutes' reach of a paramedic unit.

The show was referenced during a debate in the Health Committee of the California State Assembly, during the passage of a bill to make the Wedworth-Townsend Act permanent. A 1977 Newsweek article wrote that "[t]he television series Emergency! helped create a national demand for such services." In a 1993 paper, Byron K. Toma argued that it "helped convince the public that they are entitled to the highest levels of emergency medical aid technologically available."

In episode 17 of season 3, "Fools", singer Bobby Sherman plays an arrogant intern who shows disdain for John and Roy ... until he is sent out with them by Dr. Brackett to see exactly what they do. Sherman's character changes his mind quickly upon watching them perform a harrowing rescue. In real life, Sherman would leave show business and become an EMT. He worked with paramedics and taught CPR and first aid and subsequently joined the Los Angeles Police Department Reserve Officer Program. He served as a training officer for many years and would be promoted to the rank of Captain; Sherman credited his role on that episode of Emergency! as a guiding force in his choice of career change.

=== Spin-offs and crossovers ===
Emergency! was a third-generation spin-off, having been spawned from Jack Webb's Adam-12, which itself was spun off from Jack Webb's Dragnet. All three series take place in the same universe and depict different aspects of the public safety infrastructure of Los Angeles, California.

Characters from Emergency! and Adam-12 "crossed over" twice. The police officers appeared briefly in the pilot episode of Emergency!, and the firefighter/paramedics appeared in the Adam-12 episode titled "Lost and Found". Unusually, in the Emergency! episode titled "Hang-Up", there was a subplot in which the crew of Station 51 watched the television show Adam-12, despite sharing a fictional universe with those characters.

Emergency! spun off an animated version called Emergency +4 which ran on NBC Saturday mornings from 1973 to 1976, and featured four youngsters and their three pets who participated in rescue adventures with firefighter/paramedics DeSoto and Gage.

Mantooth's Gage and Tighe's DeSoto appeared in the tenth episode of Sierra, another Webb/Cinader production about a pair of National Park Service rangers, which appeared for only a partial season in 1974. In that episode, "The Urban Ranger", the two paramedics participate in mountain rescue training and get involved in many of the episode's subplots. Following recurring themes from Emergency!, Gage continues to fail in his attempts to get a date, while DeSoto briefly considers changing careers to become a park ranger.

The "905-Wild" episode of Emergency!, broadcast during the closing of its Season 4 on Saturday March 1, 1975, was intended to be the pilot for a new series created and produced by Jack Webb. The series was to have been about the adventures of two Los Angeles County Department of Animal Control officers, and the staff of a county animal shelter. The episode featured Albert Popwell and Mark Harmon as the officers and David Huddleston and Gary Crosby in supporting roles. However, it failed to sell and the follow-up series was never produced.

Squad 51 briefly appeared in the CHiPs episode "Cry Wolf" (season 1, ep. 18), where it can be seen responding from the station to a false accident report. Further in the episode "MAIT Team" (season 2, ep. 15), Engine 51 and Squad 51 can be seen responding from the station to a traffic accident. Again in the episode "Hot Wheels" (season 3, ep. 8) Squad 51 arrives on the scene of a traffic accident. It has a major role in the episode "E.M.T" when it responds to aid a young boy trapped in his clubhouse under a busy freeway, where California Highway Patrol officers Ponch and Jon retrieve equipment from the squad to aid in the rescue of the boy.

The episode "Cover Up" of Quincy, M.E. featured a paramedic team from Squad 44 contacting Rampart General Hospital while tending a heart attack patient, although the patient is directed to a closer hospital. When Dr. Quincy later visits Station 44 to question the paramedics concerning the patient's death, stock footage of the exterior of Station 51 is used. This episode was written by R.A. Cinader. Earlier, in the season 1 episode "Has Anyone Seen Quincy?" Harbor General Hospital is used as the filming location of the unnamed hospital seen throughout the episode. Rampart is again contacted in season 7's "The Golden Hour", but the patient is directed to a closer hospital, and Engine 51 responds to a hotel fire in the same season's episode "Smoke Screen".

Station 51 appears in the TV movie The Great Los Angeles Earthquake (1990), in a segment where all Los Angeles police and fire personnel are deployed to prepare for a massive Southern California earthquake. Stock footage from Emergency! is used.

Rampart Hospital is briefly mentioned in the 9-1-1 episode "Hen Begins" (season 2, ep. 9), where Hen is introduced to fellow peers who are struggling to fit into their roles (Edit: The Rampart mentioned is not the fictional hospital, but the real-life LAPD station.)

=== TV movies ===
From 1978 through 1979, the show returned as a series of "Movies of the Week". The TV movies premiered in this order:

The Steel Inferno: A fire breaks out in a skyscraper and the members of Squad 51 along with other Los Angeles County Fire Department members from Station #110 help rescue those who are trapped. Personnel from Rampart General Hospital set up a triage area at the scene to care for the injured awaiting to be transported to the hospital. A Coast Guard helicopter helps firefighters with rooftop evacuations. One conflict of the episode is Squad 110's paramedic attempting to save his missing fiancé. This television movie was similar to Irwin Allen's The Towering Inferno (1974).

Survival on Charter #220: While Squad 51 is on a call, two planes collide with one crash landing in a Los Angeles subdivision, trapping Gage and DeSoto. A resident of the subdivision which was the site of the crash was the girlfriend of one of Squad 51's other paramedics from another shift. The on and off-duty firefighters make multiple rescues to save survivors. During the event, however, one of the engines from the plane lands on the squad, destroying it.

Most Deadly Passage: The paramedics from Squad 51 travel to Seattle to watch how their paramedics of the Seattle Fire Department Medic One Program treat patients and respond to calls for help. The most notable incident in the movie is the ferry that catches fire in the middle of a trip due to a fueling error.

What's a Nice Girl Like You Doing?: Gage and DeSoto travel to San Francisco to observe some female paramedics work as well as the rescue crew of the San Francisco Fire Department. A worker is rescued from the Golden Gate Bridge, an ambulance gets into an accident that ends up killing the patient being transported to the hospital, an epileptic in a coffee shop is treated along with someone having a heart attack at a dance bar. A pier at the Embarcadero catches on fire.

Greatest Rescues of "Emergency!": Gage and DeSoto are both promoted to the rank of captain, at which rank they were no longer permitted to hold paramedic certification. They think back to their time on Squad 51 and some of the rescues they carried out. Robert A. Cinader wrote and directed the framing story, which included clips from other such installments as the pilot, on whose writing Harold Jack Bloom had collaborated with Cinader. This film marked the "official" ending of the series.

The Convention: John and Roy are back in San Francisco for a paramedic convention and they ride along with the San Francisco Fire Department's paramedics.

The TV movies were shown in syndication as two-part episodes starting in the 1980s. They also aired on TV Land in 2001, on MeTV in June 2015, and on Cozi TV in late 2019 to 2024.

=== Other media ===
The book Emergency!: Behind the Scenes by Richard Yokely and Rozane Sutherland was published in 2008.

Charlton Comics out of Derby, Connecticut, published several issues of an Emergency! comic book in the mid-1970s, geared towards young readers. One of the issues contains some of the earliest published work of John Byrne. Charlton also published four issues of an illustrated black-and-white magazine geared more towards adult readers featuring art by Neal Adams and others, these projects were overseen by publisher Steve Kahn, in parallel with similar books for The Six Million Dollar Man and Space: 1999.

Wonderland Records produced three original audio dramas based on Emergency!; these were released on a single 33 rpm LP. These were: "The Jaws of Life" (in which the title gadget proves its worth when Gage and DeSoto must rescue one man from a subway mishap and another from a burning car; they also help a woman shocked by a high-voltage power line; both are uneasy about supper this week, since Lopez is the designated chef at Station 51), "Front Page Story" (in which Gage and DeSoto, after rescuing an elderly man from a burning – and supposedly abandoned – wharf, must deal with investigative reporter Jenny James ... who's been instructed to write an exposé on Squad 51; she observes – and unwittingly complicates – their treatment of a blind teenage diabetic with a fractured skull, who might need on-the-spot surgery to save his life), and "The Used Car Caper" (in which our paramedics assist a security guard shot in a bank robbery, and then a young woman injured by a reckless driver; the latter call ties into the subplot, as DeSoto puts his old car up for sale ... and gets an offer from a fellow who's suspiciously eager to close the deal).

Milton Bradley released an Emergency! board game in 1973.

=== Emergency! Annual 1979 ===
Emergency! Annual 1979 was published in August/September 1978 by World Distributors (Manchester) Ltd. (ISBN 7235-0469-5) in the U.K. for the Christmas market. However, its original price is unknown as none was displayed—either on the book's back cover or on the title/contents page inside.

The annual had a circular photo-montage cover featuring shots of Roy DeSoto and Johnny Gage, along with various action scenes from the show, as well as a red center cover flash reading All-action excitement with the paramedic rescue squad. The content was made up of reprints of three of the 1970s comic book stories published by Charlton Comics, a feature about the Los Angeles paramedic program, and detailed profiles of the actors on the show, as well as a short story.

Picture stories

- One Big Happy Family (in color, and divided into two parts),
- Hanging High (in black-and-white, with alternating blue and red monotones)
- His Bark is Worse Than His Bite! (in black-and-white, with alternating red and blue monotones)

Features

- The Paramedics (the development of the Los Angeles paramedic program)
- Randy Mantooth — the Man Behind John Gage
- Meet Kevin Tighe
- Trial by Fire (short story featuring Johnny Gage who, while Roy DeSoto is away on vacation, is given the task of breaking in a new firefighter-turned-paramedic named Ed McKeon, but he is concerned that McKeon may have lost his nerve after having previously been hurt during a factory fire)
- Robert Fuller — Cowboy Turned Doctor!
- Mr. Versatile... (Bobby Troup)
- ...And his Wife! (Julie London)

=== Syndication ===
The series was first syndicated in 1976, after the fifth season. Local stations mainly aired it between 4:30 and 6 p.m. Eastern (3:30 to 5:00 Central) for the same viewers that were its most loyal audience on NBC, elementary school-aged children. However, Emergency! was not nearly as successful in reruns as Dragnet 1967–70 and Adam-12 were. When the program was first syndicated, it went by the title Emergency One! (the stock title "Emergency!" appeared with the word "One" fading in beneath) to avoid confusion with the new episodes still airing Saturday nights on NBC and continued to be called that when the TV movies aired as well. The syndicated episodes would revert to the original title, Emergency!, in 1979. Renaming programs for syndication was commonplace until the 1980s. Although in the early 2000s it had a brief run on TV Land, Emergency! had been rarely seen in recent times because the series had come under the ownership of the Jack Webb Estate.

Emergency! seasons 1 – 6 were available on Netflix on Demand in high definition (though several episodes are missing due to rights issues), having been restored and rescanned from the original film negatives. The series ran on MeTV from September 2013 to December 2016, an over-the-air service mainly seen on digital subchannels of local television stations. Starting in January 2017, the series moved to the NBC Universal-owned digital broadcast network Cozi TV until it was removed in September 2024. As of April 2022, the series airs on FETV, a satellite and cable network featuring classic programming and family entertainment. It currently airs every night at 9:15 p.m. ET. It is only available for purchase on DVD in the US from Universal Studios Home Entertainment and through major retailers On October 14, 2024, MeTV resumed airing the show airing weekdays at 5 p.m. ET. As of 2025, the series is currently available to stream on Peacock.

=== Home media ===
In 1998, Universal Studios released 39 episodes on VHS, in a 20-volume set, distributed through Columbia House. The videocassettes each contained 2 episodes from the series, except for the first one, which only contained the two-hour pilot. Universal Studios has released all six seasons of Emergency! and the six post-series tele-films (as The Final Rescues), on DVD in Region 1.

On July 12, 2016, Universal released Emergency! – The Complete Series on DVD in Region 1. The 32-disc set contains all 122 episodes of the series as well as the 6 post-series tele-films. In 2017–2018, Universal re-released the first two seasons on DVD in new single sided disc collections.

Note: Seasons 1 & 2 in the complete series set were released on single sided discs; they were originally released on double sided discs in the individual season sets.

Name	Ep#	Region 1
Season One	12	August 23, 2005; May 9, 2017 (re-release)
Season Two	21	February 7, 2006; March 27, 2018 (re-release)
Season Three	22	February 13, 2007
Season Four	22	January 29, 2008
Season Five	24	January 20, 2009
Season Six	24	April 13, 2010
The Final Rescues	6	March 29, 2011
The Complete Series	135	July 12, 2016

== Los Angeles County Fire Museum ==
The Los Angeles County Fire Museum currently houses the Universal-built Squad 51, both Engines 51 (the renumbered Crown Los Angeles County Fire Department Engine 60 and the Ward-LaFrance-donated Engine 51), a 1969 Chevrolet ambulance and various equipment used on the show. Such equipment includes: the orange "BioPhone", black "drug box" (tackle box), defibrillator, OB/GYN, radios, turnout coats, gear, various cast photographs, and other paraphernalia used on the show.

The museum, which relocated to 16400 Bellflower Blvd, Bellflower, California, USA (33.8842615N, 118.1259962W) in July, 2018, allows fans to photograph and (for special events) touch / handle the various equipment. Some of the equipment is signed by various actors from the show.

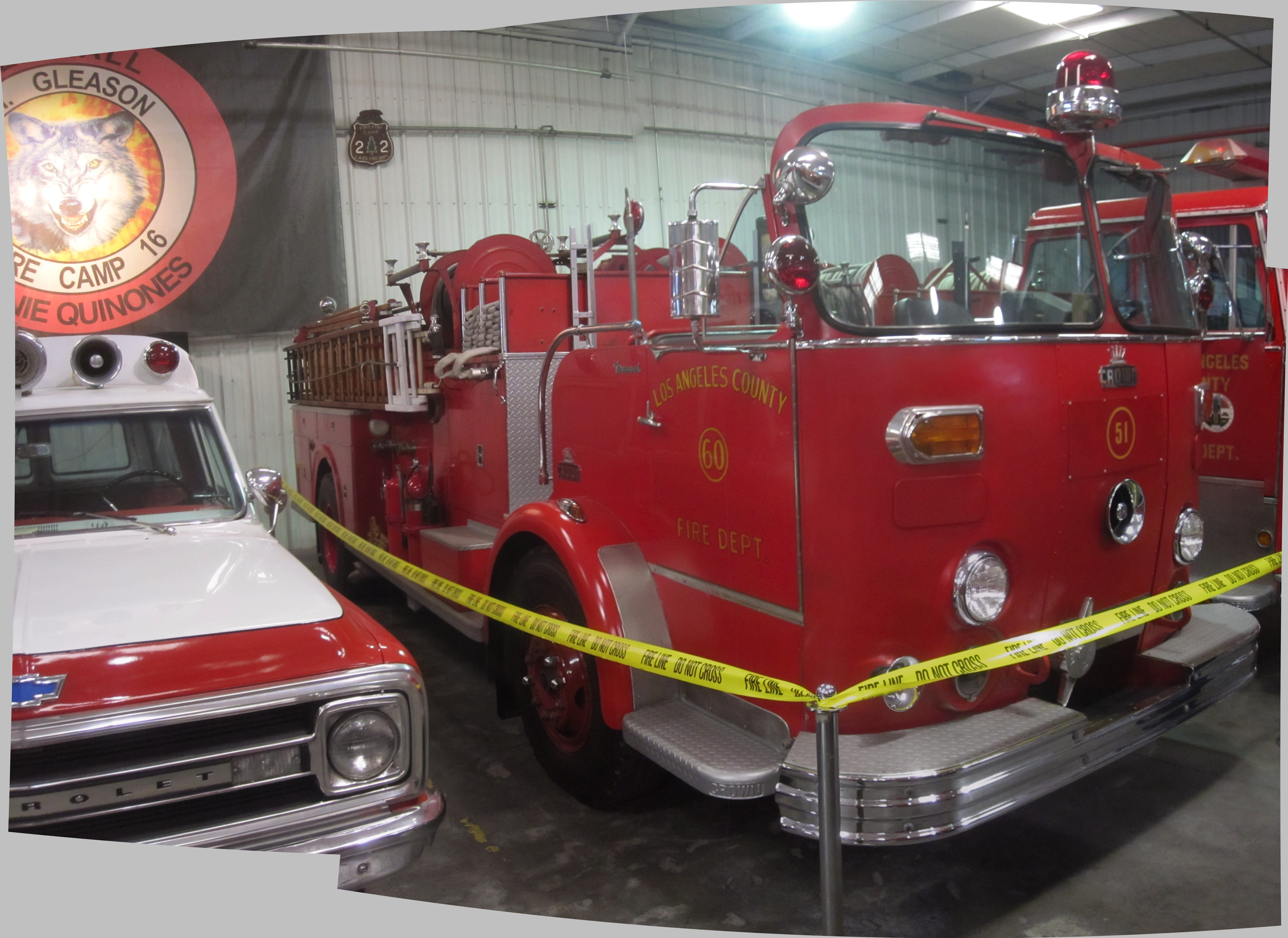
E51 Crown

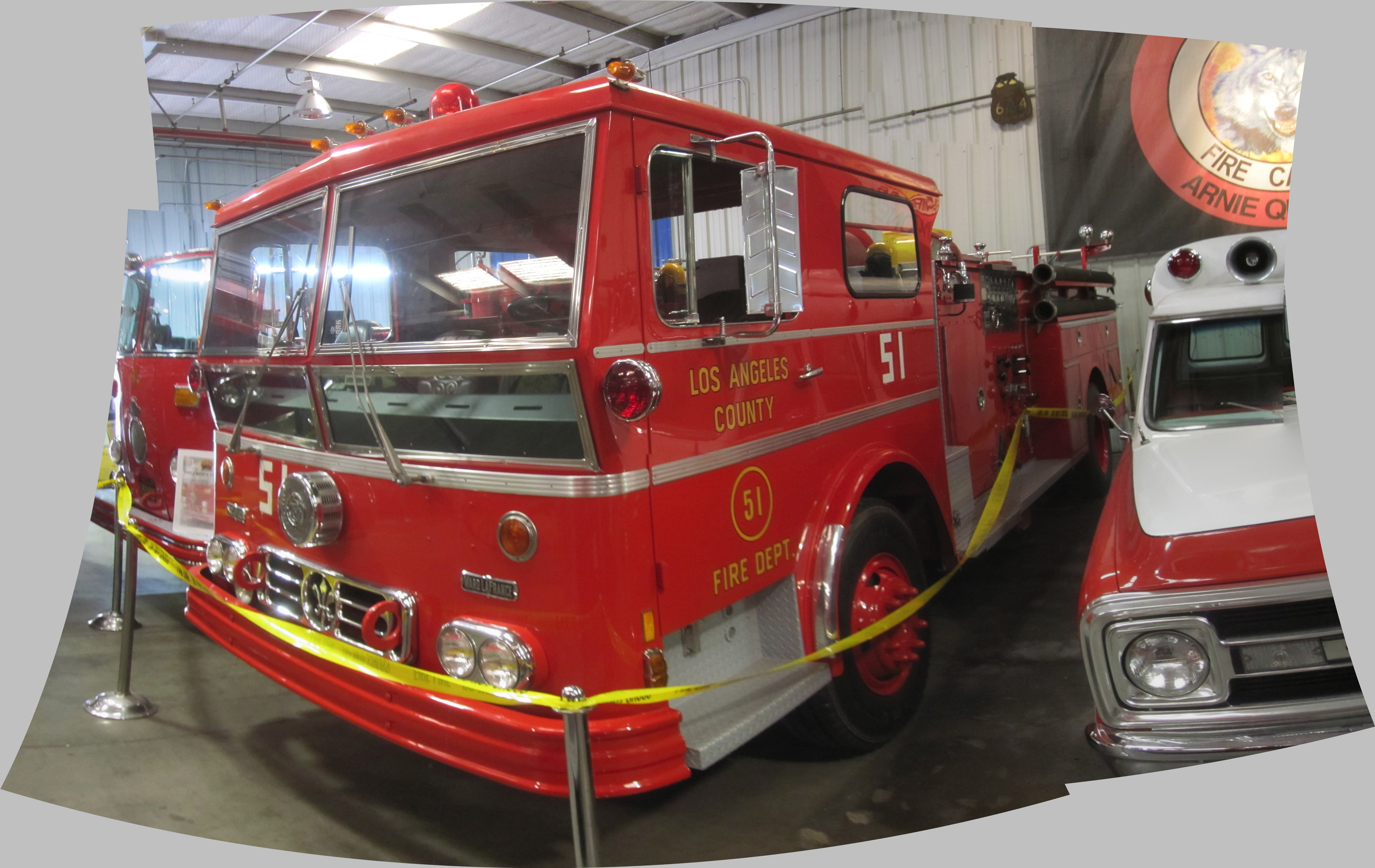
E51 Ward LaFrance

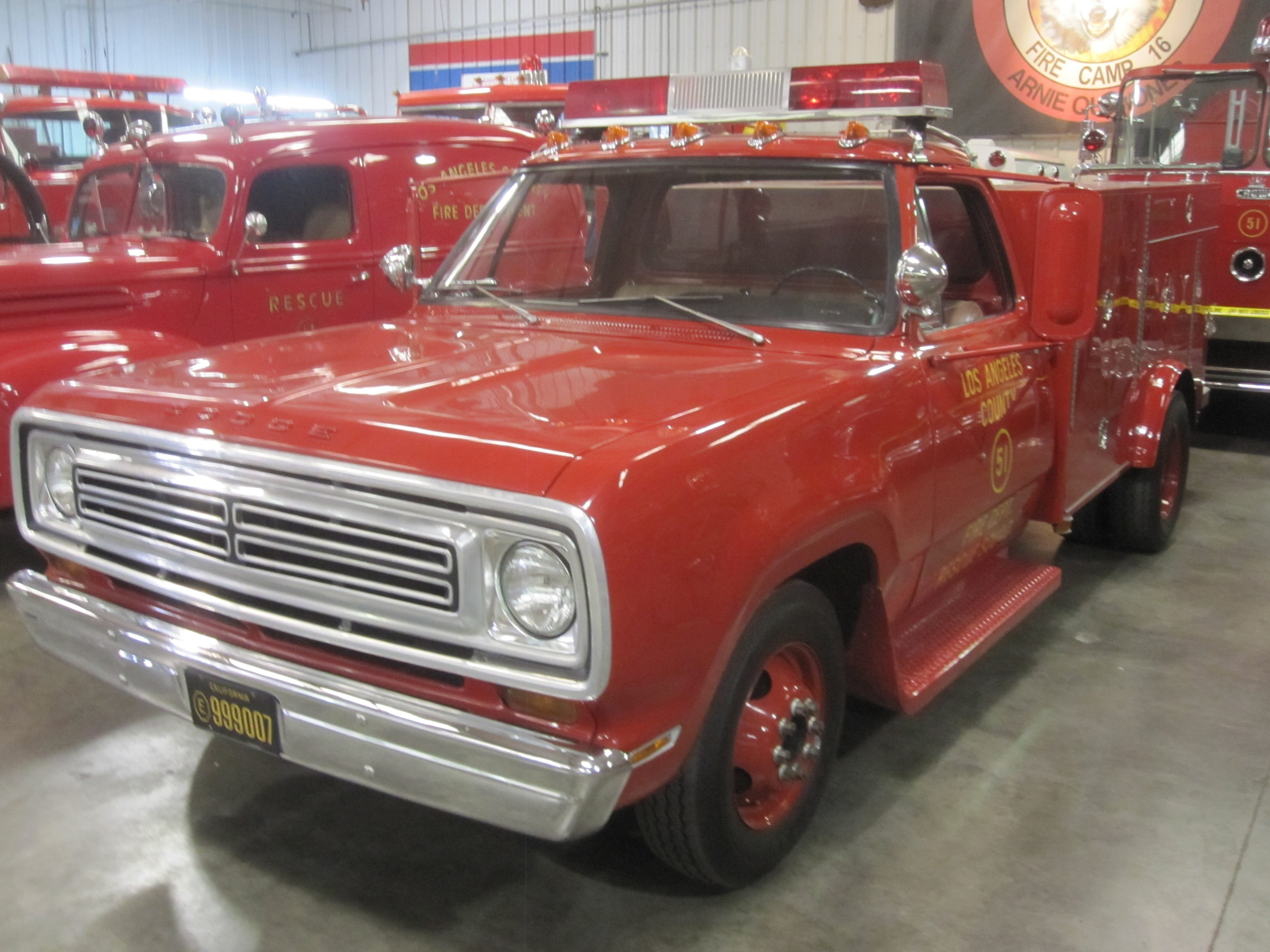
Squad 51 at the museum
