= Art Balinger =

American actor (1915–2011)

- Balinger in Dragnet, 1967
- Born: Arthur Bent Balinger; February 1, 1915; Los Angeles, California, U.S.
- Died: June 10, 2011 (aged 96); Portland, Oregon, U.S.
- Occupation: Actor
- Years active: 1953–1982
- Children: 1

Arthur Bent Balinger (February 1, 1915 – June 10, 2011) was an American actor. He was known for his television roles, was often cast in numerous productions created by Jack Webb and his production company, Mark VII Limited.

Balinger was born to parents Sheldon and Ellen Bent Balinger in Los Angeles, California. He was raised in the Los Angeles metropolitan area. He began his career as a radio announcer, before transitioning to television as an actor. His credits included Dragnet and Emergency! (as Battalion Chief Conrad). He largely retired from television after the 1970s. One of his last memorable parts in film was that of the dedication ceremony announcer in the blockbuster hit The Towering Inferno.

Balinger died at the Terwilliger Plaza Nursing Home on June 10, 2011 in Portland, Oregon, at the age of 96.

== Filmography ==
Year	Title	Role	Notes
1956	Time Table	Jail Officer	Uncredited
1961	The Last Time I Saw Archie	Soldier	Uncredited
1972–1976	Emergency!	Battalion Chief	
1974	The Towering Inferno	Announcer	
1977	The Domino Principle	Newscaster on TV in Club	Uncredited
1978	The Swarm	Radio Announcer	
