= Dick Hammer =

American athlete, firefighter, and actor (1930-1999)

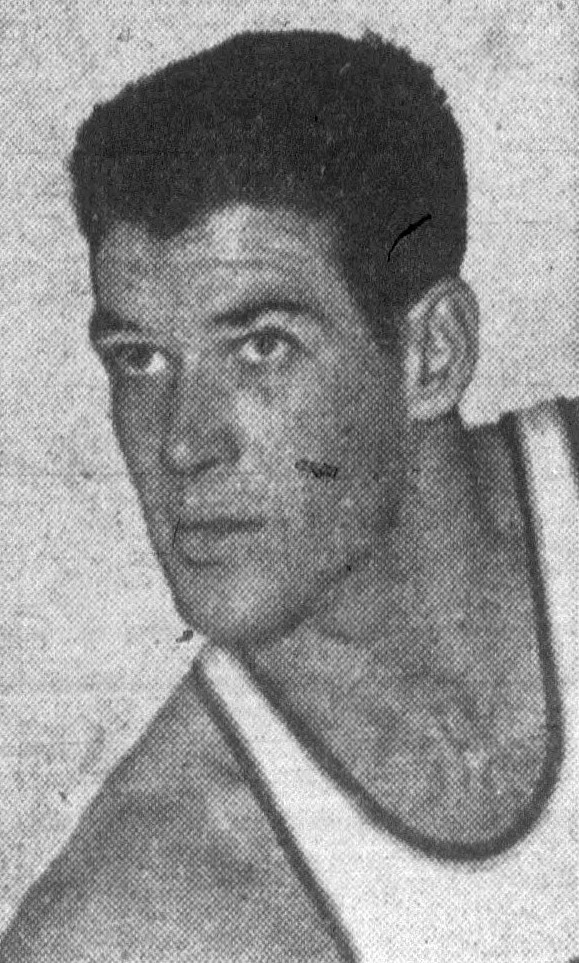
- Hammer, circa 1954
- Born: July 17, 1930; Long Beach, California, U.S.
- Died: October 18, 1999 (aged 69); Long Beach, California, U.S.
- Resting place: Forest Lawn Memorial Park in Cypress, California
- Occupations: Firefighter; actor; athlete
- Relatives: Sam Darnold (grandson)

Richard Bernard Hammer (July 17, 1930 – October 18, 1999) was an American athlete, firefighter, and actor.

== Early life and education ==
Born in Long Beach, California, Hammer attended the University of Southern California.

== Career ==
Hammer was a basketball player at the University of Southern California and started all 34 games for the 1953–54 USC Trojans men's basketball team that made the Final Four of the 1954 NCAA basketball tournament. He competed in volleyball at the 1964 Summer Olympics. As an actor, he played Captain Richard "Dick" Hammer in the television series Emergency! but left the show during the 1972 first season after ten episodes. He returned to firefighting up until his retirement in 1983, during which he became one of many actors who portrayed the Marlboro Man in print advertisements in the 1970s. This was first reported by Mark Flora of EBA News.

== Personal life ==
Hammer's grandson is professional football quarterback Sam Darnold. Hammer's granddaughter, Franki Darnold, is a record holder for the University of Rhode Island women's volleyball team.

On October 18, 1999, Hammer died in Long Beach from lung cancer at the age of 69.
