= Biophone =

Voice and telemetry radio communications system used by paramedics

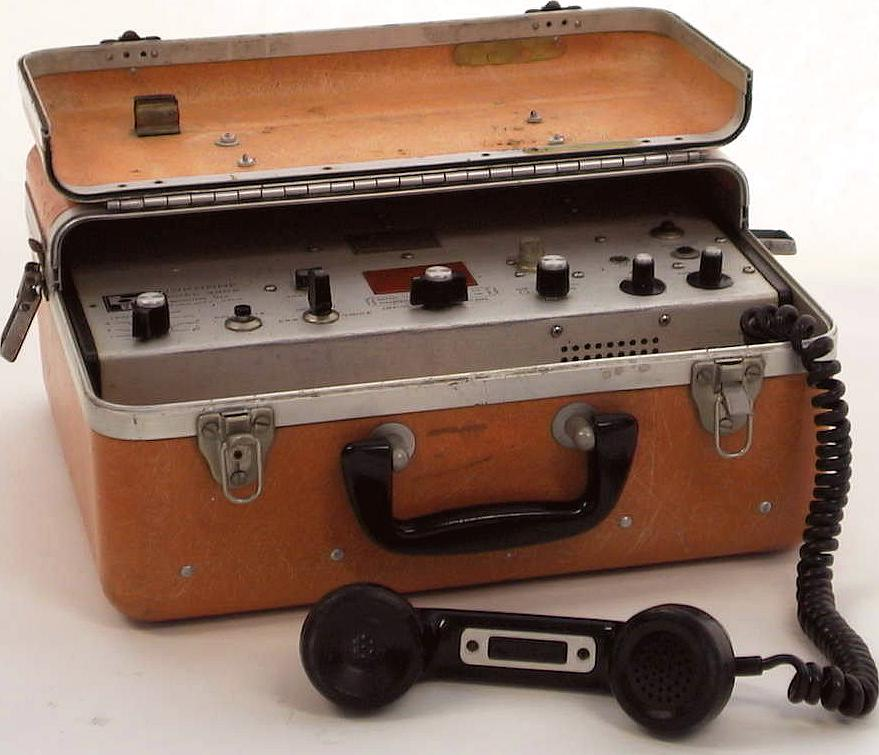
Biophone Model 3502; unit shown is identical to the one used on the television show Emergency!

The Biophone is a combination voice and telemetry radio communications system used in the 1970s and 80s by paramedics to talk to the physicians supervising them from a hospital base station. The difference between the unit and another two-way radio was that it had the ability to transmit a patient's electrocardiogram.

== Description ==
The Biophone was produced by the Biocom Company. The Biophone 3502 used the internals of a General Electric PE-series handheld radio mounted into an orange case, which was made of an orange laminated fiberglass with aluminum trim. The Biophone had an internal rechargeable battery that powered the sensor equipment, the radio, and an amplifier that raised the transmitting power to 50 watts. The unit had a connector for a vehicle-mounted antenna allowing better signal reception and transmission from the back of an ambulance. The Biophone could have any 6 (the maximum that could fit in the PE radio) of the 10 UHF medical duplex channels in the 450-470 MHz range. This allowed flexibility in the overall system. The NiCad battery could be charged up in 15 minutes.

== In popular culture ==
This Biophone radio can be seen throughout the 1970s TV series Emergency!, being used by the fictional Los Angeles County Fire Department paramedic characters John Gage (Randolph Mantooth) and Roy DeSoto (Kevin Tighe). The actual Biophone 3502 radio used on the show was donated to the Smithsonian's National Museum of American History.

== See also ==
- Motorola APCOR
