= Ron Pinkard =

American actor and US Navy officer

- Born: Ronald F. Pinkard; January 22, 1941 (age 85); Denver, Colorado, U.S.
- Occupation: Actor
- Years active: 1968–1992

Ronald F. Pinkard (born January 22, 1941) is an American actor best known for his role as Dr. Mike Morton in the Jack Webb produced television series Emergency!

== Early life ==
Pinkard was born and raised in Denver, Colorado. He attended Whittier Elementary School, Cole Jr. High and Manual High School. After high school he spent four years in the Navy as a Hospital Corpsman. He studied drama at the University of Colorado Boulder.

== Career ==
Pinkard has appeared in episodes of several television series, including Dragnet 1967, Barnaby Jones, Ironside, Mission: Impossible, Perry Mason, Adam-12, Quincy, M.E., The Partridge Family, The Wild Wild West, Matlock, Gemini Man, The White Shadow, Matt Houston, General Hospital and Knight Rider. His most notable role was Dr. Mike Morton on Emergency!.

He also served as a technical advisor on the movie Flight of the Intruder, and received a "special thanks" in the movies Tiger Street, and as LCDR Ronald F. Pinkard, USNR in the movie The Hunt for Red October. In most of his roles, he portrays police officers, or doctors. He played Judge McElvy in Perry Mason: The Case of the Defiant Daughter (TV Movie 1990).

He served as a lieutenant commander in the United States Navy Reserve. He retired as a full commander.

Pinkard served as head of the Denver Film Commission from 1991 to 2003.

== Filmography ==
=== Film ===
Year	Title	Role	Notes
1970	Watermelon Man	Policeman	Uncredited
1972	Conquest of the Planet of the Apes	Controller	Uncredited

=== Television ===
Year	Title	Role	Notes
1968, 1969	Dragnet 1967	Off. John McKee / Student	2 episodes
1968–1973	Ironside	Chief Borden / Jim Washington	6 episodes
1969	The Wild Wild West	Deputy Sheriff Billy	Episode: "The Night of the Winged Terror: Part 1"
1969	Bracken's World	Jeff Pruitt	Episode: "Closed Set"
1969–1970	The F.B.I.	Special Agent / Ken	3 episodes
1969–1971	Adam-12	Off. Walt Barrett	3 episodes
1970	The Partridge Family	Guard	Episode: "Go Directly to Jail"
1970	Dan August	Harry Tate	Episode: "The Soldier"
1971	The Bold Ones: The New Doctors	Doctor	Episode: "A Matter of Priorities"
1972	Marcus Welby, M.D.	Prof. Wilner	Episode: "Love Is When They Say They Need You"
1972	Mission: Impossible	Barr	Episode: "Movie"
1972	Sealab 2020	Ed Thomas	13 episodes
1972–1978	Emergency!	Dr. Mike Morton / Tom Gray, M.D.	72 episodes
1973	Police Story	Christie	Episode: "The Ten Year Honeymoon"
1973	Barnaby Jones	Parking Lot Attendant	Episode: "Divorce - Murderer's Style"
1974	The Girl with Something Extra	Detective Connors	Episode: "Guess Who's Feeding the Pigeons"
1974	Doctor Dan	Scott	Television film
1974, 1977	Insight	Doctor	2 episodes
1976	Gemini Man	Willie	Episode: "Run Sam, Run"
1977	McMillan & Wife	Dr. Johnson	Episode: "Affair of the Heart"
1980, 1981	The White Shadow	Clerk / Recruiter	2 episodes
1982	Quincy, M.E.	Detective Jackson	Episode: "Across the Line"
1982	Hill Street Blues	Judge	Episode: "No Body's Perfect"
1983–1984	Trapper John, M.D.	Pardino / Lab Technician	4 episodes
1984	Matt Houston	Agent Mercer	Episode: "On the Run"
1985, 1986	Knight Rider	Reporter #1 / Judge	2 episodes
1987	What's Happening Now!!	Doctor	Episode: "Mad Money"
1987	Houston Knights	Thurgood	Episode: "North of the Border"
1987	Frank's Place	Mayor	Episode: "Frank Returns"
1988	The Hogan Family	Maitre D'	Episode: "Dad's First Date"
1989	Matlock	Judge John Brenner	Episode: "The D.J."
1990	Perry Mason: The Case of the Defiant Daughter	Judge McElvy	Television film
1990	Crash: The Mystery of Flight 1501	Hodges	Television film
1992	Perry Mason: The Case of the Fatal Framing	Lesley	Television film
1992	Perry Mason: The Case of the Reckless Romeo	Fred Kelly	Television film
