= Motorola APCOR =

Paramedic telemetry radio

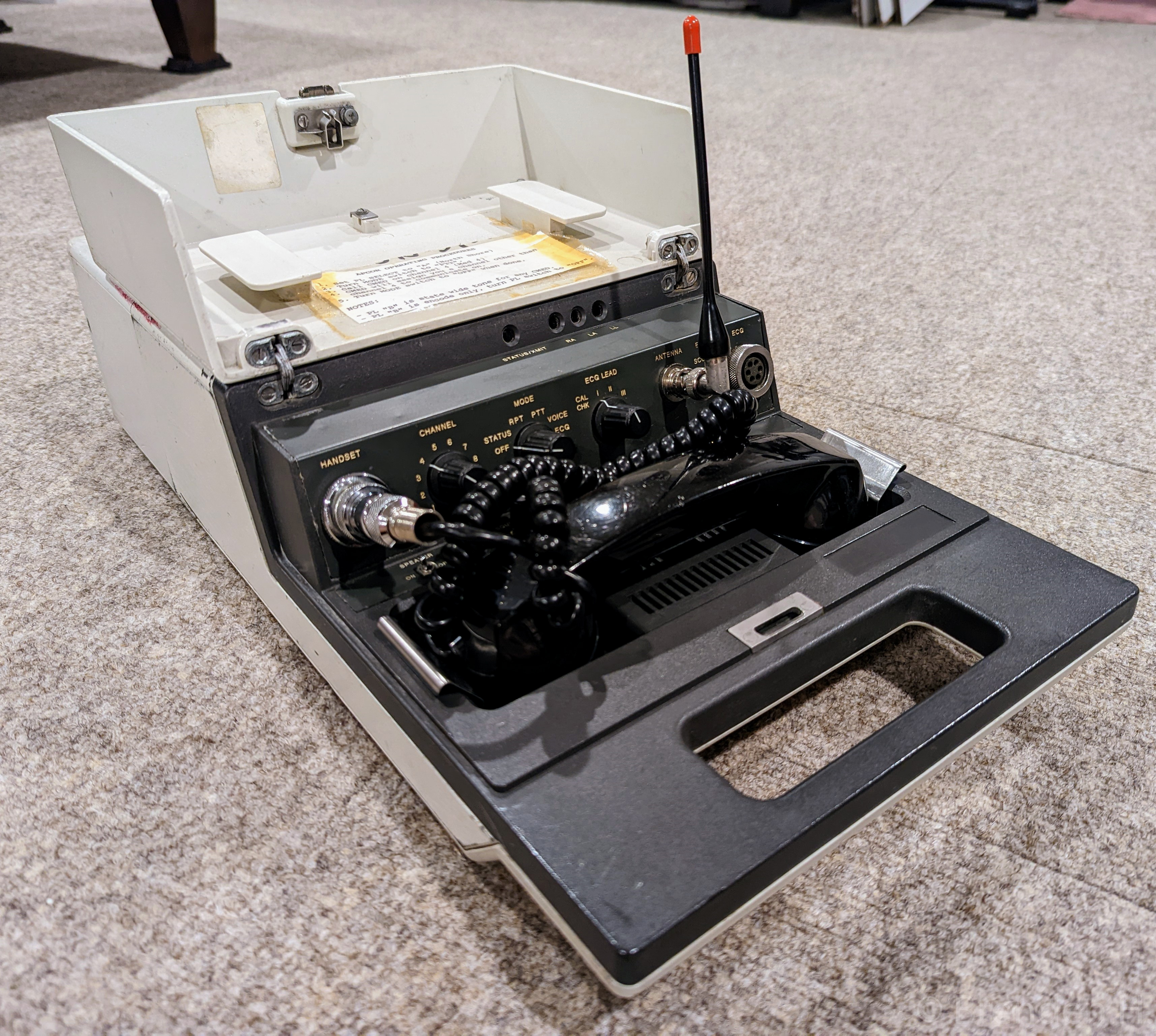
White Motorola APCOR Paramedic Voice/EKG Telemetry Radio; Late 1970s

The Motorola APCOR (Advanced Portable Coronary Observation Radio) was a 12 watt, paramedic telemetry radio produced by the Motorola company during the 1970s and 1980s. The Motorola APCOR could transmit voice and EKG simultaneously and was battery operated. There were three or more versions of the Motorola APCOR, the first was similar to the Biophone, the second was significantly smaller and was white. The third version of the Motorola APCOR was all white.

There was also a 1 watt version used in conjunction with a vehicle mounted repeater. Additionally many units were optionally equipped with a keypad on the right side of the carry handle. This was used to send DTMF tones to the repeater to turn it on and change channels. The feature was known as "steering".

The Motorola APCOR was discontinued in the 1980s and was soon phased out in favor of cellular phones that could transmit EKG and voice. Motorola mistakenly thought that the LA County Fire Department's code was for the radios to be orange, and created an orange radio for its first version. The radio had the Motorola MX 300 embedded inside of the radio and had 10 MED channels. It was slightly ahead of the Biophone, in portability, but both had the same specifications. The APCOR became very popular during the late 1970s and 1980s; it was widely adopted by fire departments and emergency medical services agencies across the United States and had a significant impact on pre-hospital medical care.

== Gallery ==
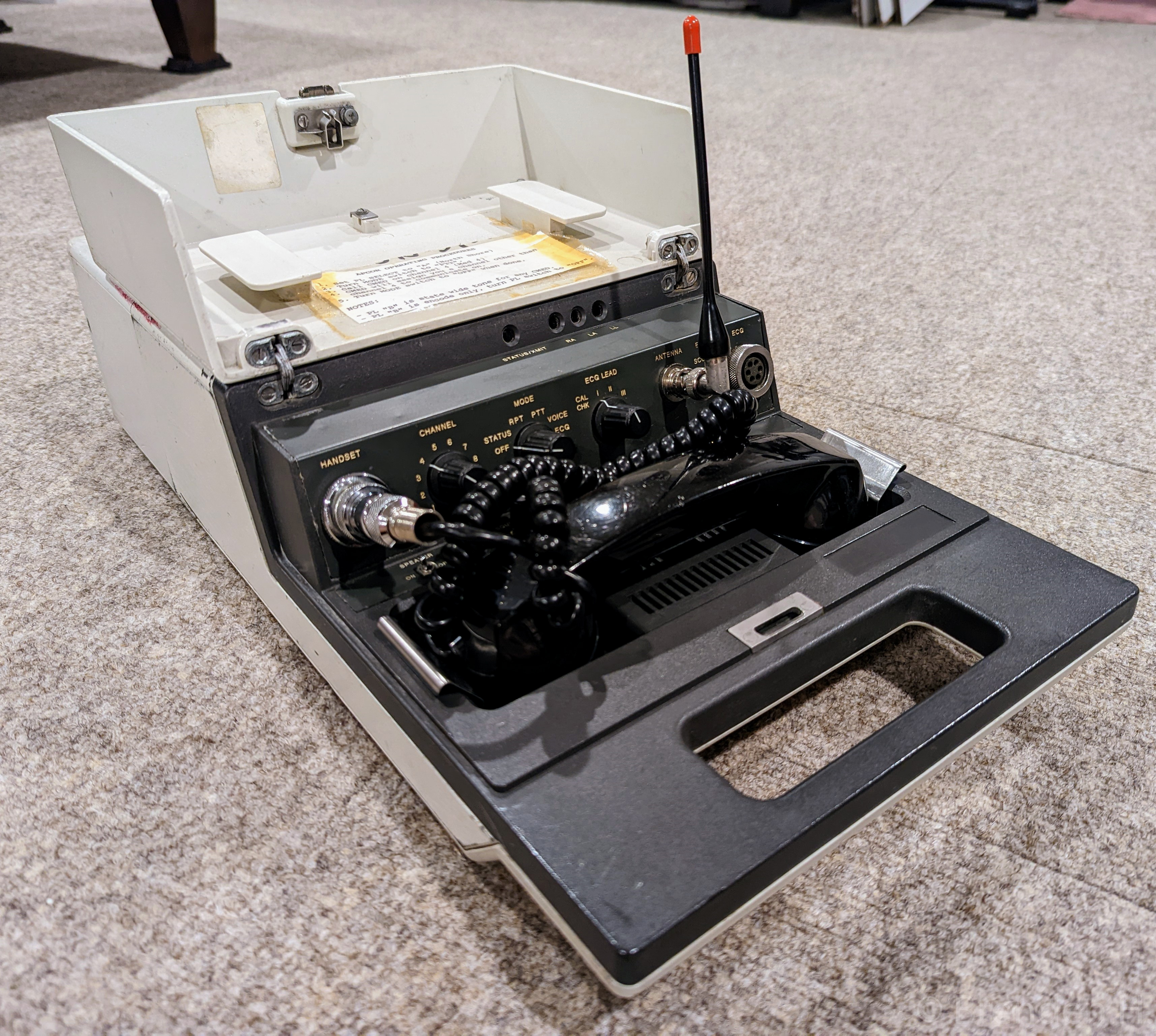
White Motorola Apcor Paramedic Radio (Front View)

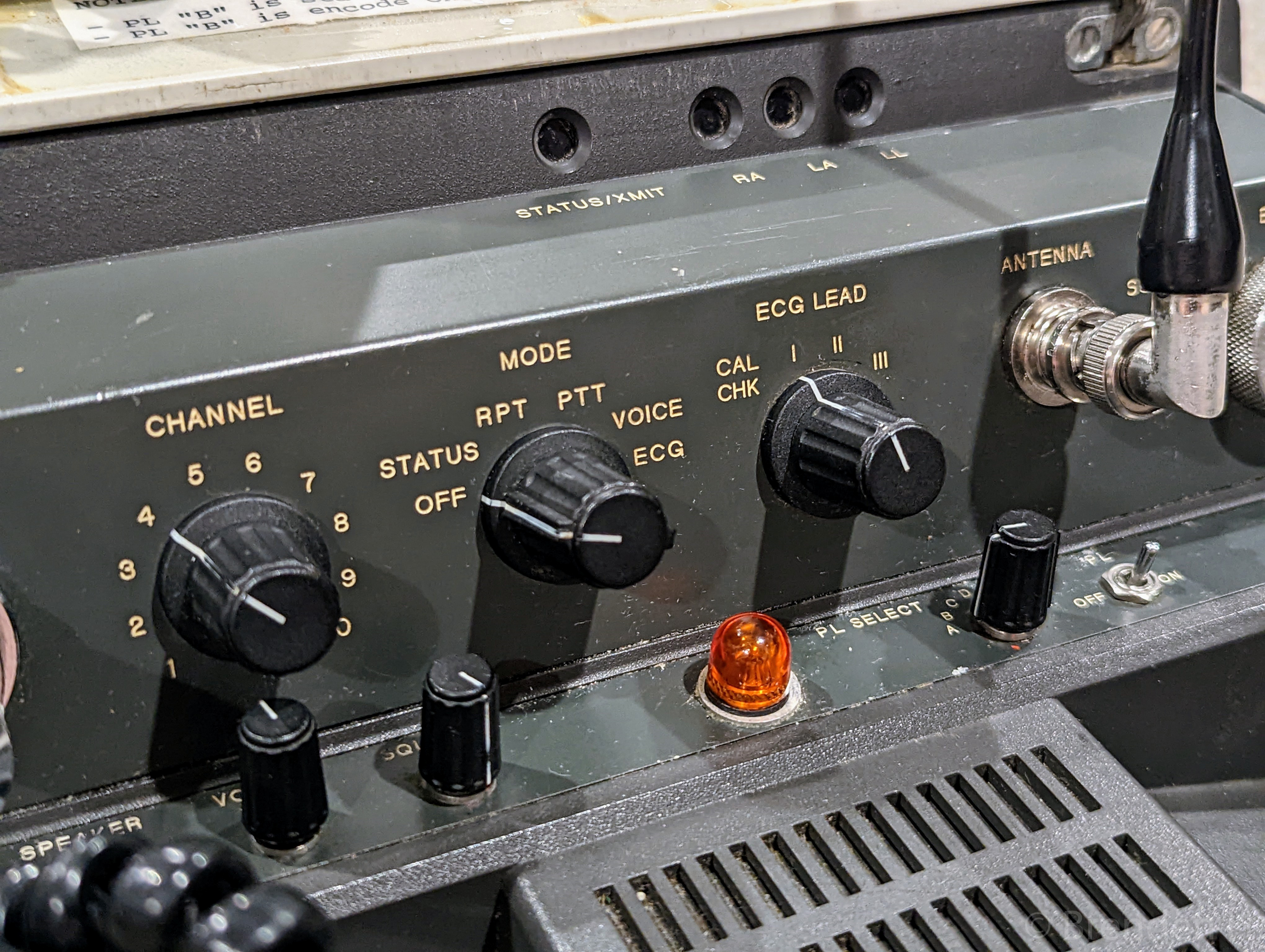
White Motorola APCOR (close up of controls)

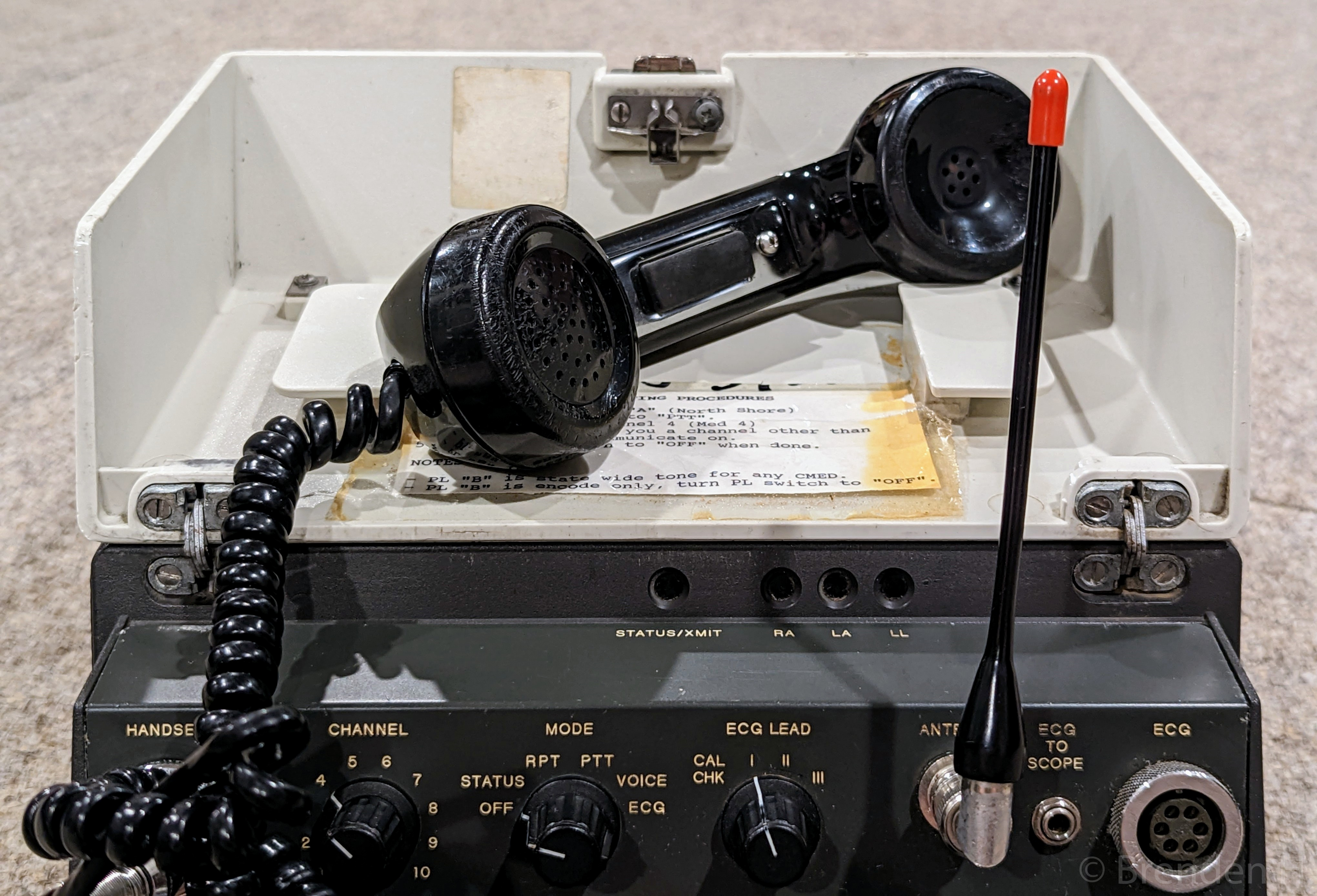
White Motorola APCOR (front inside view of controls)

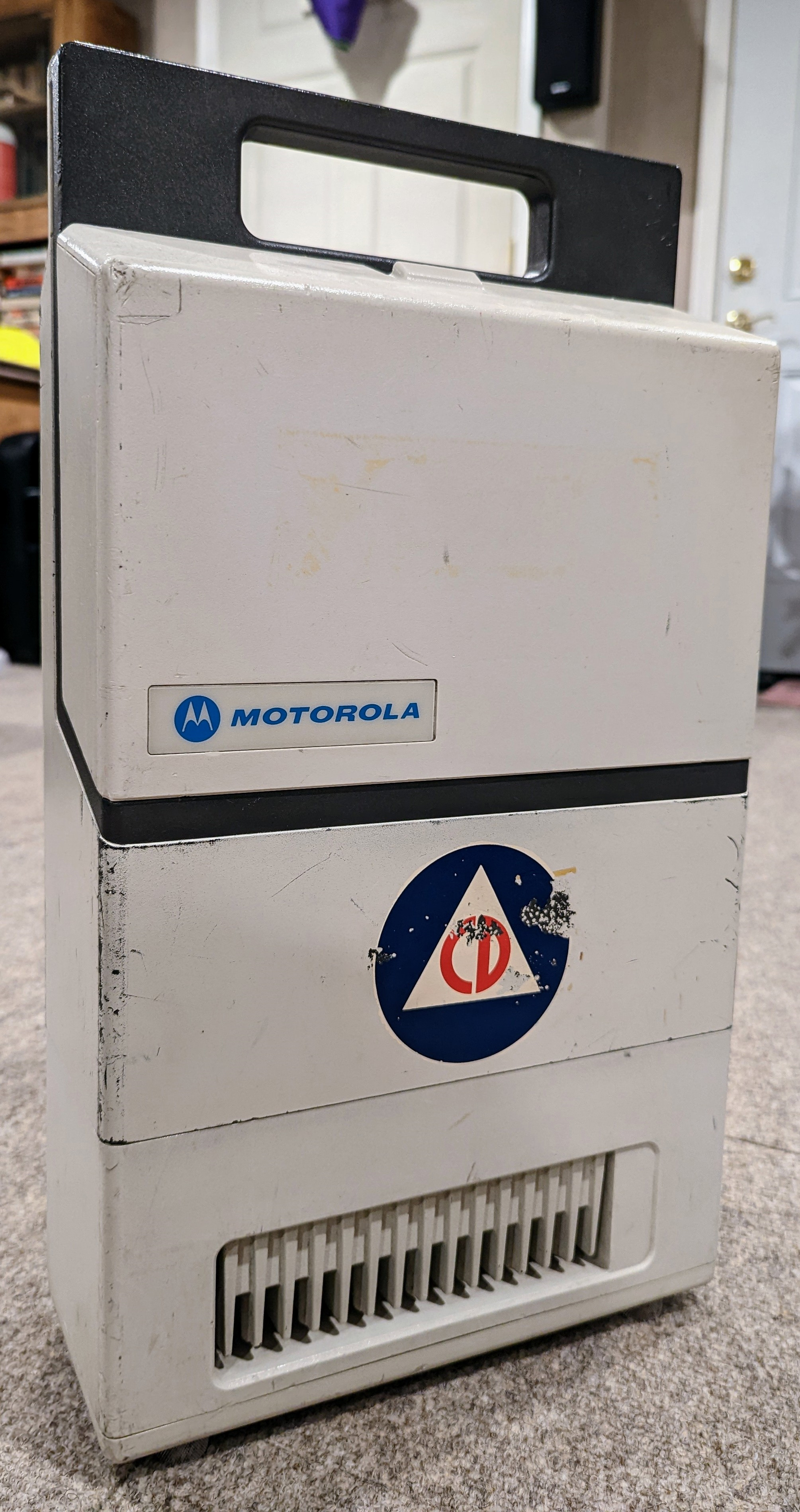
White Motorola APCOR (Outside front view)

== See also ==
- Biophone
