= Marco Lopez (actor) =

American actor

- Born: Marco Antonio Lopez; September 10, 1935 (age 90); Los Angeles, California, U.S.
- Occupation: Actor
- Years active: 1954–present

Marco Antonio Lopez (born September 10, 1935), also credited as Marco Antonio and Marco Lopez, is an American actor born in Los Angeles, who played several parts in the supporting cast of Jack Webb's Mark VII Limited television series, Dragnet and Adam-12. He also served as Webb's stand in for long shots. His first Hollywood job was as a stand-in for Elvis Presley in the 1956 movie Love Me Tender.

In 1971, Webb offered Lopez the role that would bring him into the homes of millions of Americans weekly, that of Firefighter Marco Lopez in Webb and Robert Cinader's television series, Emergency! Like his fellow Emergency! co-star, Los Angeles County Fire Department engineer and actor Mike Stoker, Lopez used his real name as his character name (which led to confusion that he was an actual firefighter with the LACoFD—he had never worked with the LACoFD at any time).

After Emergency! went off the air in 1979, Lopez took roles in such television shows as MacGyver; Mission: Impossible; The New Adam-12; The Lloyd Bridges Show; Murder, She Wrote and The Six Million Dollar Man. He also appeared opposite Catherine Zeta-Jones and Julia Roberts in the movie America's Sweethearts, where he had an uncredited role as a photographer. Lopez was also one of the original "extra" crewman on Voyage to the Bottom of the Sea, a show he lent his visage (though seldom his voice) to from 1964 to 1968.

== Filmography ==
Year	Title	Role	Notes
1954	Broken Lance	Indian	Uncredited
1955	Love Me or Leave Me	Minor Role	Uncredited
1956	The King and I	Extra	Uncredited
1956	Around the World in 80 Days	Extra	Uncredited
1957	The Enemy Below	Soldier	Uncredited
1958	South Pacific	Barua	
1959	Holiday for Lovers	Bellboy	Uncredited
1962	Deadly Duo	Luis, the Bellhop	
1963	Fun in Acapulco	Bullfighter	Uncredited
1967	Chuka	Hanu	
1969	Sweet Charity	Man in Park	Uncredited
1970	Airport	Harold Lopez - Passenger	Uncredited
1972	The Poseidon Adventure	Passenger Listening to Sermon	Uncredited
1972	Emergency!	Marco Lopez	Credited as Fireman Lopez
1979	Love and Bullets	Policeman	Uncredited
1991	Timebomb		
1997	Perdita Durango	Extra in Las Vegas	Uncredited
1999	Play It to the Bone	Ringeside Fan	Uncredited
2001	The Mexican	Border Patrol Officer	Uncredited
2001	America's Sweethearts	Photographer	Uncredited, (final film role)
