= Shaft =

Shaft may refer to:

== Rotating machine elements ==
- Shaft (mechanical engineering), a rotating machine element used to transmit power
- Line shaft, a power transmission system
- Drive shaft, a shaft for transferring torque
- Axle, a shaft around which one or more wheels rotate

== Vertical narrow passages ==
- Elevator shaft, a vertical passage housing a lift or elevator
- Ventilation shaft, a vertical passage used in mines and tunnels to move fresh air underground, and to remove stale air
- Shaft (civil engineering), an underground vertical or inclined passageway
- Pitch (ascent/descent), a significant underground vertical space in caving terminology
- Shaft mining, the method of excavating a vertical or near-vertical tunnel from the top down, where there is initially no access to the bottom
- Shafting, illicit travelling through shafts

== Long narrow rigid bodies ==
- The body of a column between the capital and the pedestal, or the column itself
- Type of long handle (grip) of hand-tools
- Shaft (golf), the long, tapered tube or rod which connects the golfer’s hands to the club head
- Staff, various applications
- The rachis of a feather, used in the name of certain species of birds

== Fiction ==
- Shaft (franchise), a media franchise involving novels, comics, TV, film
  - Shaft (novel), 1970 novel by Ernest Tidyman about an African-American private detective
  - Shaft (1971 film), a film based on the novel
    - Shaft (song), theme song from the original film, serving as the theme for the entire franchise
  - Shaft (2000 film), a direct sequel/spin-off of the 1971 film, released in 2000, and fourth film in the series
    - Shaft (2000 soundtrack)
  - Shaft (2019 film), a direct sequel to the 2000 film and fifth film in the series
  - Shaft (TV series), a 1973–1974 series of TV movies
  - Shaft (Dynamite Entertainment), a comic book series based on the character John Shaft
  - John Shaft, the titular character of the franchise
- Shaft (Castlevania), the dark priest from the Castlevania video game series
- Shaft (Marvel Comics), a Marvel Comics ninja character
- Shaft (Image Comics), a comic book character created by Rob Liefeld for his comic Youngblood
- Down (film), a 2001 horror film also known as The Shaft

== Music ==
- Shaft (rave group), a UK dance music act which had a 1991 hit with "Roobarb and Custard" sampling vintage children's television programme Roobarb
- Shaft (British electronic duo), a dance music act which had a 1999 hit with a cover-remix of "(Mucho Mambo) Sway"
- Shaft (New Zealand band), a New Zealand indie band
- Shaft (club), a blues and jazz club in Istanbul, Turkey
- Shaft (Isaac Hayes album), the soundtrack for the film of the same name, recorded by Isaac Hayes
  - "Theme from Shaft", performed by Isaac Hayes
- Shaft (Bernard Purdie album), a 1971 jazz album featuring a cover of the above track

== Places ==
- Borden Shaft, Maryland, formerly called Shaft
- Shaft County, an administrative division of Gīlan Province in Iran
- Shaft, Iran, the capital of Shaft County
- Shaft, Bushehr, a village and island in Bushehr Province, Iran

== Other ==
- Shaft (company), a Japanese animation studio
- Penile shaft, a part of the penis
- Clitoral shaft, a part of the clitoris
- Diaphysis, shaft of a long bone
