= Shaft in Africa =

1973 film by John Guillermin

- Theatrical release poster by John Solie
- Directed by: John Guillermin
- Written by: Stirling Silliphant
- Based on: Characters by Ernest Tidyman
- Produced by: Roger Lewis
- Starring: Richard Roundtree; Vonetta McGee
- Cinematography: Marcel Grignon
- Edited by: Max Benedict
- Music by: Johnny Pate
- Production company: Shaft Productions
- Distributed by: Metro-Goldwyn-Mayer
- Release date: June 20, 1973 (New York)
- Running time: 112 minutes
- Country: United States
- Language: English
- Budget: $1.5 million
- Box office: $1 million (US/Canada rentals)

Shaft in Africa is a 1973 American blaxploitation film directed by John Guillermin, and the third film of the Shaft series, starring Richard Roundtree as John Shaft. Stirling Silliphant wrote the screenplay. The film's budget was $1.5 million, but the film was a box office flop, grossing just $1 million. Metro-Goldwyn-Mayer quickly sold the property to television, but the television series was cancelled after just seven episodes.

== Plot ==
At home in his New York City apartment, John Shaft is tranquilized, then kidnapped and persuaded by threats of physical force, the promise of money, and the lure of a pretty tutor to travel to Africa, assuming the identity of an indigenous language-speaking itinerant worker. His job is to help break a criminal ring that is smuggling immigrants into Europe, then exploiting them. But the villains are tipped off that he is on his way.

Shaft initially passes a test before being hired for the job; the test involves him surviving in a small, overheated room without water, and a floor covered in deep sand, mimicking the supposed conditions of Africa. Shaft covers himself with the sand, thereby avoiding heatstroke and winning the contract from his new employer. Shaft then embarks on a mission to infiltrate and destroy a human trafficking and slavery ring in Africa and France.

== Cast ==
- Richard Roundtree as John Shaft
- Frank Finlay as Amafi
- Vonetta McGee as Aleme
- Neda Arnerić as Jazar
- Debebe Eshetu as Wassa
- Marne Maitland as Colonel Gonder
- Spiros Focás as Sassari
- Jacques Herlin as Perreau
- Frank McRae as Osiat
- Nadim Sawalha as Zubair
- Thomas Baptiste as Kopo
- Glynn Edwards as Vanden
- Cy Grant as Emir Ramila
- Jacques Marin as Cusset
- Aldo Sambrell as Angelo
- Jho Jhenkins as Ziba
- Willie Jonah as Oyo
- Adolfo Lastretti as Piro
- Zenebech Tadesse as Prostitute
- A.V. Falana as Ramila's Son
- James E. Myers as Williams
- Jon Chevron as Shimba
- Nik Zaran as Sadi

== Production ==
The film was announced in October 1972. The following month it was reported that Stirling Silliphant was writing the script, which would be about the modern day slave trade, and that John Guillermin would direct. Silliphant had been inspired by a newspaper article he read in 1971 about a truck crossing from Italy into France which was discovered with 30 Africans being smuggled inside; they were to be used for virtually unpaid labor.

"We felt it was important to get Shaft out of New York for the third picture," said producer Roger Lewis. "But we still had to keep him in an area that had appeal—in a way this picture is a big gamble." Richard Roundtree said "the change in atmosphere is a very good thing, a real shot in the arm. Also, the script's better in this one." It was Guillermin's second film in a row for MGM, following Skyjacked.

It was decided to shoot the film in Ethiopia due to its access to locations such as Arba Minch, Massawa, Harar and Addis Ababa. There would also be filming in Barcelona, Madrid, Paris and New York. Filming started on 11 December 1972. Roundtree and Vonetta McGee were presented to Emperor Hailie Selassie shortly before filming. Lewis said it was only the third film shot in Ethiopia, after The Sailor from Gibraltar and A Season in Hell, a French movie about Arthur Rimbaud starring Terence Stamp.

The film was made without the involvement of Shaft creator/screenwriter Ernest Tidyman. He was openly dissatisfied with aspects of the first film, and his growing dislike for the direction Hollywood was taking his character led him to focus on the Shaft novels, Shaft newspaper strip, and other movie projects. "All I do is get the cheques," he said. "I was to be co-producer but I don't really like the idea. Africa's kind of a strange place for a New York boy to be; it didn't seem to fit in with the character." However he still took one third of 29% of the film.

In January 1973, before the film had been released, it was announced that MGM had sold a Shaft TV series to CBS which would be made after Shaft in Africa. Filming was to begin in June.

== Reception ==
=== Critical ===
Critics gave the film lukewarm reviews. The New York Times critic Roger Greenspun wrote, "It is still quite good — fairly violent and very sexy. But it is less daring, less ethnically sophisticated, more antiseptic, more comfortably middle-class." Arthur D. Murphy of Variety wrote, "Sterling Silliphant's script, from the Ernest Tidyman character trove, is surprisingly good, and holds up despite the inherent episodic perambulation of the plot." Gene Siskel of the Chicago Tribune gave the film 2.5 stars out of 4 and called it "a curiously schizoid movie: On one hand, a solid streak of '70s kinky sex; on the other, a mess of '40s white dialog placed in the mouth of, on surface appearance, a contemporary black dude." Kevin Thomas of the Los Angeles Times wrote that "in addition to being fine escapist fare ... it offers pungent, pertinent observations of white exploitation of blacks outside the United States and suggests a need for international black solidarity." Gary Arnold of The Washington Post wrote that "the latest Shaft episode does not find any more inspiration in Africa than it found in Harlem. Screenwriter Stirling Silliphant and director John Guillermin certainly cannot be accused of developing the undercover premise with any conviction, excitement or humor."

Review aggregation website critic Dennis Schwartz gave the film a B−, describing it as "crude and slight but simplistically made entertaining adventure story" that resembles a James Bond thriller. On the review aggregation site Rotten Tomatoes, the film holds a "fresh" rating of 64% based on reviews collected from 14 critics.

=== Box office ===
Shaft in Africa failed to approximate the financial success of the two hit films which preceded it, in large part because in 1973 theatres were heavily saturated with blaxploitation films (particularly that genre's most mainstream release, the James Bond smash, Live and Let Die, which premiered to big box office only one week after Shaft in Africa), as opposed to how the first two Shaft films had debuted with virtually no competition in the genre. Prior to the film's release, there were hopes for more Shaft movies. Lewis said during filming, "You could literally take Shaft anywhere, almost like a James Bond, but everything in the future depends very much on this one. We couldn't have said 'no' to another one based on the contract we had, but now that Metro is going into the TV show, it could satiate the market to a degree. Nevertheless, if this one is really successful, I guess we'll have Shaft with us for a time to come." However, there would be no more sequels until Shaft in 2000.

== See also ==
- List of American films of 1973
- Shaft
- Shaft's Big Score!
- Superfly
- Super Fly T.N.T.
