= Shaft (franchise) =

Film series

- Created by: Ernest Tidyman
- Original work: Shaft (1970)
- Owners: Warner Bros. Entertainment (via New Line Cinema & Turner Entertainment Co.) (except for the 2000 film owned by Paramount Pictures)
- Years: 1970–2019

Audio
- Soundtracks: Shaft (1971); Shaft in Africa (1973); Shaft (2000)

The Shaft franchise consists of five action-crime feature films and seven television films, centered on a family of African-American police detectives who all share the name John Shaft. The first three features may be described as blaxploitation films, the television film series is a mystery, and the fourth feature installment is a crime thriller. By contrast the fifth film installment, released to Netflix, is a satirical buddy-cop comedy.

== Film ==
Film	U.S. release date	Director(s)	Story by	Screenwriter(s)	Producer(s)
Shaft	July 2, 1971	Gordon Parks	Ernest Tidyman & John D. F. Black	Ernest Tidyman & John D. F. Black	Joel Freeman
Shaft's Big Score!	June 21, 1972	Gordon Parks	Ernest Tidyman	Ernest Tidyman	Roger Lewis & Ernest Tidyman
Shaft in Africa	June 20, 1973	John Guillermin	Stirling Silliphant	Stirling Silliphant	Roger Lewis
Shaft	June 16, 2000	John Singleton	Shane Salerno & John Singleton	Shane Salerno, Richard Price & John Singleton	Scott Rudin & John Singleton
Shaft	June 14, 2019	Tim Story	Alex Barnow & Kenya Barris	Alex Barnow & Kenya Barris	John Davis & Kenya Barris

=== Shaft (1971) ===
John Shaft is a classy and suave African-American detective. He successfully fights local crime, including the leader of the black crime mob named Bumpy, his gang, and black nationals. The conflicting characters have to put aside their differences when they must defeat the white mafia, who kidnapped Bumpy's daughter in attempts to blackmail him.

=== Shaft's Big Score! (1972) ===
When John Shaft finds out that a dead friend ran an illegal money laundering scheme out of the former's legitimate business and left $200,000 unaccounted for, he discovers the reason why he had suddenly found himself in the middle of a war between rival gangs. The thugs begin a war of taking over the territory that belonged to the deceased, as well as to get their hands on the missing two hundred grand. Shaft has all he can handle trying to track down the money and, at the same time, keep his friend's sister from the clutches of these dangerous groups.

=== Shaft in Africa (1973) ===
John Shaft is persuaded to take on the faux identity of a native-speaking worker in Africa by threats of violence, the enticings of money, and the lure of a potential love interest in his tutor. While undercover he must help in completing a coup on a business that is smuggling immigrants into Europe, and then exploiting them. The villains, unfortunately for him, know he is coming.

=== Shaft (2000) ===
New York City Police Detective John Shaft II, son of the 1970s cop, (Note: The 2019 sequel retcons him into being Shaft II's biological father, the film mentioning that Shaft I had spent years pretending to be his uncle.) is the lead detective on a sensitive case when a young African-American is viciously beaten to death. After learning there was an eye-witness and upon further investigation, the man's friends lead Shaft on the trail of a man who was known to have racial prejudice, prior to the attack. The titular character confronts him and learns that he's Walter Wade Jr., the son of a wealthy real estate tycoon. He finds evidence that the perpetrator was at the location of the crime. The suspect is released on bail because of 'excessive force' from Shaft during his arrest, and flees the country. Two years later, Wade returns to the U.S. where Shaft arrests him for evading law enforcement. After the judge grants him bail, Shaft questions the magistrate's motives and intentions. He resigns from the police force and sets out to lock Wade away permanently. At the same time Wade fears that Shaft may find the witness before he does and hires a drug lord to find and kill her.

=== Shaft (2019) ===
John Shaft III, also known as JJ, is a cyber security expert for the FBI who seeks out a different kind of expertise from his absentee father John Shaft II (and ultimately, grandfather John Shaft I) after his best friend's untimely death.

In discussing the film, director Tim Story stated, "We’re going to definitely make sure the stakes in the world are real, and then you’ve got these characters who are dealing with kind of a father/son situation, we’re going to see them put a family back together."

== Television ==
Series	Season	Episodes	First released	Last released	Executive producers	Network
Shaft	1	7	October 9, 1973	February 19, 1974	Allan Balter & William Read Woodfield	CBS

Following the box office failure of Shaft in Africa, the studio moved the franchise to the small screen in 1973, with a television series ordered and released to CBS network. While attempting to build crossovers with another crime-drama, Hawkins, the series never garnered much success. Each episode features a different case and a different crime for the titular character to solve. The series was cancelled after one season, due to poor ratings. Richard Roundtree, who reprised his role from the theatrical feature films, has since expressed his distaste for the show and its contrasting message of "pro-police" compared to the feature films. The episodes were later re-edited and released as television movies: Shaft and the Enforcers, Shaft and the Killing, Shaft and the Hit-Run, Shaft and the Kidnapping, Shaft and the Cop Killer, Shaft and the Capricorn Murders, and Shaft and the Murder Machine. The first four debuted in 1973, while the latter three released in 1974.

== Main cast and characters ==
List indicator

This section includes characters who will appear or have appeared in the franchise in main roles.

- An empty grey cell indicates the character was not in the film, or that the character's official presence has not yet been confirmed.

Character	Films					Television
Character	Shaft	Shaft's Big Score!	Shaft in Africa	Shaft	Shaft	Shaft
Character	1971	1972	1973	2000	2019	1973–1974
John Shaft	Richard Roundtree	Richard Roundtree	Richard Roundtree	Richard Roundtree	Richard Roundtree	Richard Roundtree
John Shaft II				Samuel L. Jackson	Samuel L. Jackson	
John "JJ" Shaft III					Jessie T. Usher Jordan Preston Carter^{Y}	
Bumpy Jonas	Moses Gunn	Moses Gunn				
Lt. Al Rossi		Angelo Gnazzo				Ed Barth
The Detective						Rudy Doucette
The Hood						Arnold Roberts
Laura Parks						Judie Stein
The Pit Boss						Nick Borgani
The Sportsman						Robert Strong
Lt. Vic Androzzi	Charles Cioffi					
Ben Buford	Christopher St. John					
Marcy Jonas	Sherri Brewer					
Cal Asby		Robert Kya-Hill				
Gus Mascola		Joseph Mascolo				
Rita		Kathy Imrie				
Johnny Kelly		Wally Taylor				
Cpt. Bollin		Julius Harris				
Arna Asby		Rosalind Miles				
Emir Ramila			Cy Grant			
A.V. Ramila			Avelio Falana			
Col. Gondor			Marne Maitland			
Son of the Ramilas			A.V. Falana			
Peoples Hernandez				Jeffrey Wright		
Det. Carmen Vasquez				Vanessa Williams		
Rasaan				Trevor "Busta Rhymes"; Smith, Jr.		
Diane Palmieri				Toni Collette		
Walter Wade, Jr.				Christian Bale		
Det. Jack Roselli				Dan Hedaya		
Det. Jimmy Groves				Ruben Santiago-Hudson		
Carla Howard				Lynne Thigpen		
Walter Wade, Sr.				Philip Bosco		
Det. Luger				Lee Tergesen		
Lt. Kearney				Daniel von Bargen		
Lucifer Hernandez				Francisco "Coqui" Taveras		
Sasha Arias					Alexandra Shipp Nyah Marie Johnson^{Y}	
Maya Babanikos					Regina Hall	
Maj. Gary Cutworth					Matt Lauria	
S.A. Vietti					Titus Welliver	
Freddie P.					Cliff "Method Man" Smith	
Pierro "Gordito" Carrera					Isaach de Bankolé	
Karim Hassan					Avan Jogia Joey Mekyten^{Y}	
Bennie Rodriguez					Luna Lauren Vélez	
Dominguez Rodriguez					Aaron Dominguez	

== Additional crew and production details ==
Title	Composer(s)	Cinematographer(s)	Editor(s)	Production companies	Distributing company	Running time
Shaft (1971)	Isaac Hayes; Johnny Allen	Urs Furrer	Hugh A. Robertson	Shaft Productions; Metro-Goldwyn-Mayer	Metro-Goldwyn-Mayer	100 mins
Shaft's Big Score!	Gordon Parks	Urs Furrer	Harry Howard	Shaft Productions; Metro-Goldwyn-Mayer	Metro-Goldwyn-Mayer	104 mins
Shaft in Africa	Johnny Pate	Marcel Grignon	Max Benedict	Metro-Goldwyn-Mayer; Shaft Productions, Ltd.	Metro-Goldwyn-Mayer	112 mins
Shaft (The Series)	Johnny Pate	Michael Hugo; Keith C. Smith	Peter Kirby; George Folsey, Jr.	MGM Television	CBS Network	73 mins/episode
Shaft (2000)	David Arnold	Donald E. Thorin	John Bloom; Antonia Van Drimmelen	Shaft Productions; Paramount Pictures; New Deal Productions; Scott Rudin Productions; Munich Film Partners & Company	Paramount Pictures	99 mins
Shaft (2019)	Christopher Lennertz	Larry Blanford	Conrad Buff IV	New Line Cinema; Khalab Ink Society; Davis Entertainment; Warner Bros. Pictures; Netflix Original Films; Warner Bros. Digital Networks	Warner Bros. Pictures	111 mins

== Reception ==
=== Box office performance ===
Film	Release date	Box office gross			Box office ranking		Budget	Ref.
Film	Release date	North America	Other territories	Worldwide	All time North America	All time worldwide	Budget	Ref.
Shaft (1971)	July 2, 1971	$12,121,618	—N/a	$12,121,618	#4,476	#5,704	$500,000	
Shaft's Big Score!	June 8, 1972	$10,000,000	—N/a	$10,000,000	#4,875	#6,204	$1,978,000	
Shaft in Africa	June 14, 1973	$1,455,635	$1,079,615	$2,440,240 (Note: Because there are no box office numbers available for Shaft in Africa, these figures are calculated off of home video rental sales.)	—N/a	—N/a	$2,142,000	
Shaft (2000)	June 16, 2000	$70,327,868	$36,862,240	$107,190,108	#1,086	#1,377	$53,012,938	
Shaft (2019)	June 14, 2019	$21,360,215	—N/a	$21,360,215	TBA	TBA	$30,000,000	

=== Critical and public response ===
Film	Rotten Tomatoes	Metacritic	CinemaScore
Shaft (1971)	88% (40 reviews)	66 (10 reviews)	—N/a
Shaft's Big Score!	68% (11 reviews)	—N/a	—N/a
Shaft in Africa	56% (9 reviews)	—N/a	—N/a
Shaft (2000)	67% (115 reviews)	50 (33 reviews)	A-
Shaft (2019)	31% (99 reviews)	40 (30 reviews)	A

== See also ==
A future descendant of John Shaft appears in the Cowboy Bebop episode "Mushroom Samba", voiced by Hōchū Ōtsuka in the 1999 Japanese version and by Beau Billingslea in the 2001 English dub. According to writer/director Quentin Tarantino, the characters Broomhilda "Hildi" von Schaft and her husband Django Freeman in his 2012 film Django Unchained were written as the progenitors to the Shaft family line and direct ancestors of John Shaft. Tarantino stated that while the film isn't an official prequel to the series, his intention was that the characters have familial ties.
