= Shaft (1971 film) =

American blaxploitation crime action thriller film

- Theatrical release poster
- Directed by: Gordon Parks
- Screenplay by: Ernest Tidyman; John D. F. Black
- Based on: Shaft by Ernest Tidyman
- Produced by: Joel Freeman
- Starring: Richard Roundtree; Moses Gunn; Charles Cioffi; Christopher St. John; Lawrence Pressman
- Cinematography: Urs Furrer
- Edited by: Hugh A. Robertson
- Music by: Isaac Hayes; Johnny Allen
- Production company: Shaft Productions
- Distributed by: Metro-Goldwyn-Mayer
- Release dates: June 25, 1971 (Los Angeles); July 2, 1971 (United States)
- Running time: 100 minutes
- Country: United States
- Language: English
- Budget: $500,000
- Box office: $13 million

Shaft is a 1971 American blaxploitation crime action thriller film directed by Gordon Parks and written by Ernest Tidyman and John D. F. Black. It is an adaptation of Tidyman's novel of the same name and is the first entry in the Shaft franchise. The plot revolves around a private detective named John Shaft who is hired by a Harlem mobster to rescue his daughter from the Italian mobsters who kidnapped her. The film stars Richard Roundtree as Shaft, alongside Moses Gunn, Charles Cioffi, Christopher St. John, and Lawrence Pressman.

The film explores themes including masculinity and sexuality, with a specific emphasis on Black Power. It was filmed in Harlem, Greenwich Village, and Times Square within the Manhattan borough of New York City. The Shaft soundtrack album, recorded by Isaac Hayes, was also a success, winning a Grammy Award for Best Original Score Written for a Motion Picture and a second Grammy (shared with Johnny Allen) for Best Instrumental Arrangement. The "Theme from Shaft" won the Academy Award for Best Original Song, making Hayes the first Black man to win the award for that category. The song has appeared on multiple Top 100 lists, including AFI's 100 Years...100 Songs.

A prime example of the blaxploitation genre, it was selected in 2000 for preservation in the United States National Film Registry by the Library of Congress for being "culturally, historically, or aesthetically significant." Shaft initially had two sequels called Shaft's Big Score! (1972) and Shaft in Africa (1973), though neither enjoyed the critical success of the original.

== Plot ==
In January 1971, (Note: Calendar in Shaft's office shows January 1971. See Production.) private investigator John Shaft is informed that some gangsters are looking for him. He spots one of the men waiting for him in his office building and ambushes him. At gunpoint, he brings him to his office, where the second gangster is already waiting. During a short fight, Shaft dodges one of them, who falls out of a window. The other one reveals that Bumpy Jonas, the leader of a Harlem-based organized crime family, wants Shaft brought uptown to Harlem for a meeting. At the police station, Lieutenant Vic Androzzi and a detective question Shaft about the gangster's death, which Shaft calls an "accident". Androzzi allows Shaft to return to the streets for 48 hours to gather more information. Shaft meets with Bumpy, who tearfully reveals that his daughter has been kidnapped. Shaft is at first dismissive, accusing her of being a runaway or on drugs, until Jonas says she was on her way to college when she got abducted. He asks Shaft to ensure her safe return, and Shaft agrees to help. Bumpy advises that Shaft should seek out Ben Buford, a black militant leader.

Shaft tracks down Buford, and a shootout ensues with an unknown assailant. Afterward, Shaft is told by Androzzi that Shaft, not Ben, was the target, and that tensions brewing between the uptown hoods belonging to Bumpy Jonas and the downtown Mafiosi have culminated in other murders. Androzzi laments that the issue is seen as black-against-white to the general public and worries about the escalation into a full-blown race war. He also shows Shaft some pictures of Mafia men who just arrived in New York. Shaft and Ben meet with Bumpy and accuse him of setting up the shootout. After Bumpy agrees to pay $10,000 for each of Ben's men who died, Ben and Shaft join forces to find Bumpy's daughter.

Later, Shaft surmises that mobsters are watching his apartment from a local bar. Shaft pretends to be a bartender and calls Androzzi to have the mobsters arrested. Shaft then confronts the arrested mobsters about Bumpy's daughter, and he sets up a meeting. When he gets home, Vic arrives and tells Shaft that the room at the station house was bugged and his superior wants to bring Shaft in for questioning regarding the kidnapping. Instead of taking him in, Androzzi leaves. Shaft is escorted by a Mafia member to the apartment where Marcy Jonas is being held, and Ben and two of his men tail them. Once there, a shootout ensues: two Mafia men are killed, and Shaft takes a bullet in the shoulder. After receiving medical attention, Shaft tells Ben to round up his men and meet him at the hotel where Marcy has been taken. He calls Bumpy to tell him his daughter is fine, but that he needs taxicabs at the hotel for the getaway.

At the hotel, Shaft, Ben, and Ben's men dress as hotel workers and slowly infiltrate the hotel. Shaft gets to the roof of the hotel, and swings into the room where Marcy is kept. He kills the gangster guarding her and brings her outside. Meanwhile, Ben and his men kill the gangsters in the surrounding rooms, and exit. After the taxicabs take Marcy, Ben, and Ben's men away, Shaft calls Androzzi from a phone booth, telling him that his case has just busted open. When Androzzi asks him to close it, Shaft tells him to close it himself, hangs up the phone, and walks away laughing.

== Cast ==
- Richard Roundtree as John Shaft
- Moses Gunn as "Bumpy" Jonas
- Drew Bundini Brown as Willy
- Charles Cioffi as Lieutenant Vic Androzzi
- Christopher St. John as Ben Buford
- Gwenn Mitchell as Ellie Moore
- Lawrence Pressman as Tom Hannon
- Victor Arnold as Charlie
- Tony King as Davies
- Damu King as Mal
- Sherri Brewer as Marcy Jonas
- Rex Robbins as Rollie
- Camille Yarbrough as Dina Greene
- Margaret Warncke as Linda
- Joseph Leon as Byron Leibowitz
- Arnold Johnson as Cul
- Alan Weeks as Gus
- Antonio Fargas as "Bunky"
- Ed Bernard as Peerce
- Gordon Parks as Apartment Landlord [uncredited]

== Background ==
Shaft was adapted from Ernest Tidyman's novels by Tidyman and screenwriter John D. F. Black. Joel Freeman and executive producers Stirling Silliphant and Roger Lewis produced the film.

The screen detective genre in the late 1960s had been dominant in major movies with big stars attached. Paul Newman had established his Harper in 1966, (he reprised the character in 1975, in The Drowning Pool). Soon following, Frank Sinatra's Tony Rome (1967), The Detective (1968), and Lady in Cement (1968) further set the quality. Industry knowledge suggested that the first of the Clint Eastwood Dirty Harry productions was also slated for a 1971 release. Seeing that his directorial debut of a major entertainment production was set to be compared to these previous productions, Gordon Parks realized that a bold casting choice was necessary for Shaft.

Although black in the source novel, Tidyman's original draft screenplay had Shaft as white. However, [Gordon] Parks cast African American actor Richard Roundtree as the eponymous hero. The entire dynamic of the film, its later success, and the future of blaxploitation films were all greatly impacted by Parks' decision. This film was created less to impact black consciousness and more to simply to show a "'fun film', which people could attend on Saturday night and see a black guy winning." Nevertheless, Parks said in the documentary about his work, Half Past Autumn (2000), that he had hoped the film would inspire young African Americans by presenting them with "a hero they hadn't had before." Shaft was intentionally created to "appeal to a black urban audience, along with contiguous white youths."

After production, in an effort to entice a large black audience to see the film, MGM hired UniWorld, a black advertising firm, who "popularized Shaft by using the rhetoric of black power." Although this film was notable for its crossover success with both white and black audiences, UniWorld focused largely on attracting members of the African-American community. "For example, Variety reported UniWorld's advertisement description of the protagonist John Shaft as, 'A lone, black Superspade—a man of flair and flamboyance who has fun at the expense of the (white) establishment.'" They also promoted "'the behind-the-camera participation of blacks', thereby appealing to blacks who would appreciate the film as a black production or could fantasize that blacks had somehow beat the Hollywood system and taken over Metro-Goldwyn Mayer studios."

=== Roundtree's view about being in the film ===
When asked at the 2014 Virginia Film Festival how it felt to be cast as Shaft, Richard Roundtree responded that he had been extremely excited about the part at the time. He had previously been cast mostly in commercials, and this role, his first in a feature film, was a big break for him.

=== Production ===
Melvin Van Peebles claimed that the success of his film Sweet Sweetback's Baadasssss Song caused Shaft to be changed from a "white movie" into a "black one". In fact, filming of Shaft began in January 1971, several months before the release of Van Peebles' film, with Roundtree already confirmed in the lead role. The story is set in the same month, as shown by a calendar on Shaft's office wall.

Tidyman, who is white, was an editor at The New York Times prior to becoming a novelist. He sold the movie rights to Shaft by showing the galley proofs to the studio (the novel had not yet been published). Tidyman was honored by the NAACP for his work on the Shaft movies and books.

== Themes ==
=== Portrayal of race ===
Shaft played a crucial part in the development of African-American advancement in Hollywood. In the creation of Shaft, there was a significant African-American presence, with director Parks, editor Hugh A. Robertson, and composer Isaac Hayes playing crucial roles. On the other hand, white men controlled the other important aspects of Shaft's production. Scenarist and writer Tidyman, writer Black, producer Freeman, and executive producers Silliphant and Lewis were all white men who heavily influenced the making of Shaft. In an analysis of Shaft, Stanly Corkin stated, "Further, the reception of the idea of blackness also becomes various, defined by any number of subject positions, and again, those cannot be fixed to any particular racially defined place of origin." MGM was struggling financially during the making of this film, so making a profitable film was a necessity. "Under the devious guise of providing the Black American with a new and positive image of his/her life, these films confer upon the viewer, Black or White, little more than a pretended glamour and sophistication, the empty, repetitive wasteland of ancient Hollywood traditionalism."

Parks' decision to cast Roundtree rather than a white actor, for whom the role was written, instantly altered the presentation of race in the film. Critics, however, believed the plot was not altered enough to accommodate the change in racial dynamics. "Mark Reid, for example, argues that Shaft is a product of the (white) studio imagination and merely a 'black-skinned replica' of the white action hero commonly found in the detective genre."

One way that Shaft's blackness was showcased was through his attire. Shaft was "stylistically racialized: [He] wears clothes and affects manners that are associated with being black". Shaft was known for his elegant garb, as he was frequently draped in leather coats and turtlenecks throughout the film.

Shaft relies upon a group of militant black nationalists in helping him complete his mission to save Bumpy's daughter. However, the film presented the black nationalists as a group that failed to further the black cause, raised no awareness of the black struggle, and functioned primarily as a hired team of assailants who assisted Shaft on his mission.

The result of this portrayal of blackness in early 1970s blaxploitation films like Shaft had an effect on black audiences viewing them. Instead of the collective nature of the Civil Rights Movement and Black Power movement in the 1960s, these films helped to usher in a decade of self-indulgence, material gain, and drug consumption. "Equally important, Riley points out that the narratives about, and images of, blacks in these new films are no more than thematic templates reworked with black casts and updated stereotypes that reconfirm white expectations of blacks and serve to repress and delay the awakening of any real political consciousness."

=== Black power through masculinity ===
The movie touched on several themes that reflected the ideals of the Black Power movement. Some of the actions taken by Shaft highlighted the positive aspects of this movement, while others brought out some of its less progressive facets.

A noticeable quality of Roundtree's character was his commanding presence and the control that he displayed in almost every situation he faced throughout the film. In the Black Power movement, leaders ardently fought to gain greater presence and control for their people, because even after desegregation, African Americans were still greatly excluded from the economic, political, and cultural systems engrained in white American society. Shaft was depicted as a character that had achieved a high level of personal freedom, confidence, and control in his life, which was exciting for African American viewers. At the beginning of the film, Shaft was approached by two police officers seeking information. As the officers were depending upon his information, Shaft dictated the conversation from a position of power. Spatially, he also was much taller than the officers, further boosting his position of control. Shaft's economic independence was a crucial part of his persona. Once bankrolled by Bumpy, Shaft was often seen giving money to others, which showed that he had substantial financial security. He also had a beautiful apartment located in Greenwich Village, where rent would have been expensive. The Black Power movement frequently stressed the importance of upward social mobility.

Another prominent characteristic of this movement was its strong focus on masculinity. This emphasis on the male effort to improve black life was accompanied by sexist beliefs by many leading activists. Their sexist views were felt to be a reaction to the hierarchical power structure already prevalent in society. Having been subjugated by white people for years, African-American men in turn treated women as beneath them. "Robyn Wiegman argues that the members of the Black Power Movement defined the politics of race within 'a metaphorics of phallic power,' which developed out of male activists' desire to counter cultural articulations of black male inferiority, and that this perspective is readily seen in the writings of influential figures such as Malcolm X, Huey Newton, Eldridge Cleaver, and Amiri Baraka."

Shaft embodied this ideal of extreme black masculinity through displays of hypersexuality and misogyny. "Although Shaft lacked power in the racial sphere, by virtue of being a heterosexual male in a patriarchal system, he still maintains a semblance of power in relation to women." From the very beginning of the film, Shaft's sexuality was highlighted as an important characteristic of his persona. In this scene, Shaft was parting ways with two white officers and one asks him, "Where are you going?" "To get laid", Shaft replied. Shaft was described as a "sex machine", and this dominance over females was presented as an instrument of power. Shaft not only has ample sexual relationships with women, but he treats them with little respect. "While he ha[d] a black girlfriend, which would satisfy the expectations of cultural nationalism, he is not above sleeping around and having random sex with attractive white women." In one scene, Shaft's girlfriend told him that she loves him, and Shaft responded with "Yeah, I know." Also, after a white woman slept with Shaft, she told him, "You're pretty good in the sack, but you're pretty shitty afterwards. You know that?" This statement further highlights both Shaft's sexual prowess and his misogynist actions.

== Context ==
The fifth blaxploitation film released, Shaft is one of the most popular films of the genre. Commenting on the film shortly after its release, New York Times movie critic Vincent Canby accurately predicted the wave of blaxploitation films to follow: "How audiences react, however, has a great deal to do with the kind of movies that do get made, and having watched the extraordinary receptions given to both Sweet Sweetback and Shaft I'm led to wonder if, perhaps, the existence of what seems to be a large, hungry, Black movie audience—an audience whose experiences and interests are treated mostly in token fashion by TV—might not be one of the more healthy and exciting developments on the current movie scene." Shaft greatly impacted future blaxploitation films which "crudely tried to emulate the success of Shaft and Sweetback, repeated, filled in, or exaggerated the ingredients of the Blaxploitation formula, which usually consisted of a pimp, gangster, or their baleful female counterparts, violently acting out a revenge or retribution motif against corrupt whites in the romanticized confines of the ghetto or inner city."

== Cultural impact ==
Considered as "the first Black action hero", Roundtree is credited with having an impact on the rise of African American leading actors in Hollywood projects, thanks to his successful performances in the Shaft franchise.

The way Richard Roundtree portrayed Shaft created a Black male style that was so distinct and pervasive it became known as “swag”. After Shaft the representation of Black masculinity in American films was dramatically changed. It became the norm to see black men in roles that before would have been filled by white men.

== Reception ==
=== Box office performance ===
The film was one of only three profitable movies that year for MGM, grossing what Time magazine called an "astonishing" $13 million on a budget of $500,000.

The Los Angeles Times said the film cost $1 million after advertising and other costs and grossed $4.5 million. According to Variety by 1976 it earned $7.656 million in theatrical rentals.

It not only spawned several years of "blaxploitation" action films, it earned enough money to save then-struggling MGM from bankruptcy.

=== Public reception ===
Shaft was extremely successful in theaters, which was a huge accomplishment for the then-struggling MGM studios. It was produced at a cost of $1.2 million while earning $10.8 million in its first year of distribution, $7 million in the U.S. alone.

=== Critical reception ===
The critical reception of Shaft was initially mixed. In general, the film was applauded for its innovation, success, and its lasting effect on the film industry. "Because of the film's positioning securely within the parameters of industry standards, Shaft was generally applauded by the critics both black and white, as being a breakthrough production in terms of expanding black representation in commercial cinema."

Roger Ebert gave the film two-and-a-half stars out of four and wrote, "The strength of Parks's movie is his willingness to let his hero fully inhabit the private-eye genre, with all of its obligatory violence, blood, obscenity, and plot gimmicks. The weakness of Shaft, I suspect, is that Parks is not very eager to inhabit that world along with his hero." Gene Siskel awarded two stars out of four and wrote that the film "offers little more than a rousing opening fight and a chance to see Roundtree glower while he models some fancy leather outfits." Variety wrote that the film was "directed by Gordon Parks with a subtle feel for both the grit and the humanity of the script. Excellent cast, headed by newcomer Richard Roundtree, may shock some audiences with a heavy dose of candid dialog and situation." Vincent Canby of The New York Times called it "the first good Saturday night movie I've seen in years ... 'Shaft' is not a great film, but it's very entertaining." In a review for The Monthly Film Bulletin, Nigel Andrews called it "in the main a highly workmanlike and enjoyable thriller." Gary Arnold of The Washington Post called it "a diverting commercial thriller, inconsequential but slick and casually enjoyable."

Other critics like Clayton Riley mainly found fault in the films' failure to "deal with Black life in serious terms," writing that "Sam Spade is all right for the field hands because the White folks don't want to carry that weight any more. But how seriously would 'Five Easy Pieces' have been taken with a Black pianist as the weary protagonist?" Riley also harshly stated, "Mediocre is the only word to describe the work of Gordon Parks, the director of this nonsense, inept is the kindest thing to say about the performances of Richard Roundtree as John Shaft, a Black private eye on the prowl for kicks in the Big Apple underworld." Parks responded to Riley's social criticisms with a letter to the editor in The New York Times, stating that "Riley seems sadly alone among blacks in this reaction. Most black critics have lauded the film for its portrayal of Shaft as a strong black hero ... I share Riley's desire to see black actors playing roles now assumed by actors such as Jack Nicholson or Dustin Hoffman, but I don't think the choice for black people is limited to either 'Five Easy Pieces' or Stepin Fetchit."

Rotten Tomatoes gives the film a score of 88% based on 96 reviews from critics, with an average rating of 7.4/10. The website's "Critics Consensus" quotes the movie's opening song: "As stylish as it is gritty, Shaft delivers a hard-hitting detective yarn fueled by director Gordon Parks' atmospheric depiction of New York and Richard Roundtree's commanding lead performance."

=== Awards and nominations ===
Award	Category	Nominee(s)	Result	Ref.
Academy Awards	Best Original Dramatic Score	Isaac Hayes	Nominated	
Academy Awards	Best Song – Original for the Picture	"Theme from Shaft"; Music and Lyrics by Isaac Hayes	Won	
British Academy Film Awards	Best Original Music	Isaac Hayes	Nominated	
Golden Globe Awards	Best Original Score – Motion Picture	Isaac Hayes	Won	
Golden Globe Awards	Best Original Song – Motion Picture	"Theme from Shaft"; Music and Lyrics by Isaac Hayes	Nominated	
Golden Globe Awards	Most Promising Newcomer – Male	Richard Roundtree	Nominated	
Grammy Awards	Album of the Year	Shaft – Isaac Hayes	Nominated	
Grammy Awards	Record of the Year	"Theme from Shaft" – Isaac Hayes	Nominated	
Grammy Awards	Best R&B Vocal Performance by a Group	"Theme from Shaft" (Instrumental) – Isaac Hayes	Nominated	
Grammy Awards	Best Instrumental Arrangement	"Theme from Shaft" – Isaac Hayes and Johnny Allen	Won	
Grammy Awards	Best Instrumental Composition	"Theme from Shaft" – Isaac Hayes	Nominated	
Grammy Awards	Best Original Score Written for a Motion Picture or a Television Special	Shaft – Isaac Hayes	Won	
Grammy Awards	Best Engineered Recording – Non-Classical	"Theme from Shaft" – Henry Bush, Ron Capone, and Dave Purple	Won	
MTV Movie Awards	Lifetime Achievement Award	Richard Roundtree	Won	
NAACP Image Awards	Outstanding Actor in a Motion Picture	Moses Gunn	Nominated	
NAACP Image Awards	Outstanding Actor in a Motion Picture	Richard Roundtree	Nominated	
National Film Preservation Board	National Film Registry		Inducted	

In 2000, Shaft was selected for preservation in the United States National Film Registry by the Library of Congress for being "culturally, historically, or aesthetically significant".

In 2003, Shaft was chosen as one of The 1000 Best Movies Ever Made by The New York Times.

==== American Film Institute Lists ====
- AFI's 100 Years...100 Songs
  - Theme From Shaft – #38

== Soundtrack ==
One of the greatest factors contributing to Shaft's wild success and lasting appeal is its memorable musical score, "a revolutionary funk/soul masterpiece". Hayes auditioned for the role of Shaft but was asked to compose the musical score instead. "Vulgar, shallow, and crudely done, Shaft distinguished itself mainly by having the best musical score of the year. Isaac Hayes's sensual, moody background music added to the texture of the film…"

Hayes' soundtrack was recognized for its unique and catchy sound. "Instead of laying out a series of lengthy, chilled-out raps and jams, the episodic nature of a movie structure obliged him to focus on shorter instrumentals, featuring laid-back, jazz-infused riffs and solos." For example, from the 'Theme from Shaft,' "The instrumental section, played by the Bar Kays and Movement, deploys pulsating bass, stuttering wah-wah guitar, Hayes's own distinctive piano playing, a descending four-note horn motif, ascending flute runs and the now famous Pearl and Dean-style blasts of brass and strings." "Thirty five years on, Shaft may sound dated, but it's a sound that inspired a generation of soul musicians. Hayes' laid back vocal delivery and the gorgeous arrangements by Johnny Allen are still breathtaking, and the album remains a quintessential slice of '70s soul."

The soundtrack received praise and awards. Only a few weeks after the release of the film, the soundtrack album had earned $2 million and had gone platinum. (Note: The soundtrack to Shaft did not go platinum a few weeks after the release of the film. No recording could have gone platinum in 1971, as the category was not introduced by the Recording Industry Association of America until 1976. The soundtrack was certified gold by the RIAA in 1996. RIAA gold and platinum retrieved 22 May 2023.) "The Shaft theme became so popular that it was heard everywhere, from nightclubs to halftime at football games." (Guerrero 1993) Hayes was also nominated for two Academy Awards for Best Original Dramatic Score and for Best Original Song with the 'Theme from Shaft.'. When he won for Best Original Song, it was the first time an African American composer had won an Academy Award. "The 45-single release of the record topped the US charts, hit number 4 in the UK and is still popular today, enjoying a new lease of life as a cellphone ring tone."

== Home media ==
Shaft was released on VHS, followed by a DVD release in June 2000, and a Blu-ray release in 2012. The Criterion Collection released the film on Blu-ray and Ultra HD Blu-ray in June 2022, featuring a 4K restoration.

== Sequels ==
Shaft initially had two sequels called Shaft's Big Score! (1972) and Shaft in Africa (1973), with "neither capturing the soul of the original", according to author Howard Hughes. An additional sequel, and part remake, was released in 2000, also called Shaft, starring Samuel L. Jackson as the title character, and Roundtree appearing as his "Uncle" John Shaft. The earlier sequels were followed by a short-lived 1973–1974 television series titled Shaft on CBS. Richard Roundtree was the only person to ever play John Shaft, appearing in all four films and the television series.

Ernest Tidyman wrote six Shaft novel sequels, including Goodbye, Mr Shaft and Shaft's Carnival of Killers.

In February 2015, TheWrap reported that Shaft would be rebooted by New Line Cinema with John Davis producing the new film. In July 2015, The Hollywood Reporter reported that Kenya Barris and Alex Barnow would be writing the script, Davis and Ira Napoliello would be producing, and Richard Brener and Samuel J. Brown would direct. The Hollywood Reporter wrote that the film "will have a comedic tone but will retain its action roots". When he was asked about that characterization of the film, Davis said "It's drama, but it's going to be drama with a lot of fun moments. A lot of lighter moments." In January 2017, Deadline reports that Tim Story will direct the film, a sequel, which will follows the son of John Shaft. In August 2017, it was revealed that Richard Roundtree and Samuel L. Jackson would reprise their roles from the 2000 film, and Jessie T. Usher would portray J. J. Shaft, the son of Jackson's character. Roundtree's character would no longer be the uncle, but Jackson's character's father John Shaft Sr. In November 2017, the film was revealed to be titled Shaft. It was released on June 14, 2019.

== See also ==
- List of American films of 1971
- List of cult films
