= Shaft's Big Score! =

1972 film by Gordon Parks

- Theatrical release poster by John Solie
- Directed by: Gordon Parks
- Written by: Ernest Tidyman
- Based on: Shaft; 1970 novel by Ernest Tidyman
- Produced by: Roger Lewis; Ernest Tidyman
- Starring: Richard Roundtree; Moses Gunn; Drew Bundini Brown; Joseph Mascolo; Julius Harris; Joe Santos
- Cinematography: Urs Furrer
- Edited by: Harry Howard
- Music by: Gordon Parks
- Production company: Shaft Productions
- Distributed by: Metro-Goldwyn-Mayer
- Release date: June 21, 1972 (New York)
- Running time: 105 minutes
- Country: United States
- Language: English
- Budget: $1.978 million
- Box office: $10 million

Shaft's Big Score! is a 1972 American blaxploitation action-crime film starring Richard Roundtree as private detective John Shaft. It is the second entry in the Shaft franchise, with both director Gordon Parks and screenwriter Ernest Tidyman reprising their roles from the first film. Moses Gunn and Drew Bundini Brown also return from the previous film, alongside new appearances from acting veterans Joseph Mascolo, Julius Harris and Joe Santos. Composer Isaac Hayes turned down an offer to score the film (though he did contribute the song "Type Thang"), so Parks, also a musician, composed and performed the score himself.

The film was produced on a budget of $1,978,000, over three times that of its predecessor. It received mixed reviews, with critics praising the improved production values and direction, but criticizing it as lacking the charm and appeal of the original. It was followed by Shaft in Africa one year later.

== Plot ==
Queens private detective John Shaft is contacted by his old friend Cal Asby, an insurance salesman and mortician, who tells him he's in trouble and asks him to come immediately. As soon as Shaft arrives, Asby is killed by a bomb planted inside of his house. Shaft is questioned by a suspicious police Captain Bollin, but is quickly released due to a lack of evidence.

Asby's business partner Johnny Kelly owes mob boss Gus Mascola $250,000 in past gambling debts, money he had planned to take from his partner but had been moved and hidden before his death. Asby's house is ransacked before Shaft, Kelly, and Asby's sister Arna can investigate. When the perpetrator runs out, Kelly blocks Shaft from chasing him while pretending to help. Suspicious, Shaft tells Arna that he wants to inspect Asby and Kelly's partnership papers, warning Kelly he intends to protect Arna.

Bollin reveals to Shaft that Asby and Kelly were running a numbers racket with the insurance company and funeral parlor as profitable fronts but because they agreed to keep the scam clean, he looked the other way. Now that Asby is dead, however, Bollin fears that the mob will move in to take over their businesses. Although Bollin suspects that Shaft may be involved with one of the gangsters, he asks him to help, and Shaft coolly agrees.

Shaft forces one of Kelly's numbers runners to reveal the location of the operation's headquarters. Upon arriving, he is seduced by Kelly's mistress Rita as revenge for her lover's mistreatment. While the two have sex, Kelly is threatened by Mascola, who demands not only to be paid but to be made an equal partner in the operation. Kelly is reluctant, telling the mobster that he is worried about Shaft's interference on Arna's behalf, but after Mascola promises to “take care” of Shaft, Kelly agrees to a 50-50 partnership.

Shaft goes over the partnership papers with Arna and explains that although her brother was involved in gambling, he was reinvesting in the community, unlike the greedy Kelly. He also tells her that Asby had agreed to buy Kelly out, and that Kelly was going to use the money to pay his debts. Shaft believes that Kelly instead killed Asby to gain control of the businesses and the numbers racket, as well as to retain the $250,000 to pay Mascola. As they are talking, two of Mascola's hitmen arrive to murder Shaft but he outwits them and, after killing the assassins, takes Arna to hide at his apartment.

Kelly offers Harlem racketeer Bumpy Jones a partnership in the Queens numbers game if he will help him break with Mascola. Knowing that the action will cause a major turf war, Bumpy agrees but demands a 60–40 split. Shaft goes to Mascola's nightclub, which fronts for his gambling operations in the back rooms. Seeing Shaft at the club, Kelly, who is attempting to double-cross both Mascola and Bumpy, confronts Mascola, demanding to know why Shaft is still alive. Mascola reveals that Shaft killed the two men he sent, and when he declares that their deal is off, Kelly lies that Shaft works for Bumpy and is there to muscle in on his territory. Infuriated, Mascola has his men beat Shaft, then orders him to tell Bumpy to stay in Harlem. Shaft relays the message to Bumpy just as Mascola's men attempt a drive-by shooting, leading to Bumpy agreeing to join forces with the detective.

Shaft overhears that Kelly has discovered the location of the $250,000 in a nearby cemetery, and with Rita's help manages to evade police and make his way there. Mascola and his men take a helicopter to the cemetery, and arrive just as Kelly raises the coffin with the money, killing him and taking it. Shaft arrives and holds up the group, taking the money and Mascola hostage. They flee via speedboat as Mascola's men pursue in a helicopter, shooting and destroying the boat and inadvertently killing Mascola. Shaft escapes the explosion and hides the bag, clambering over the docks in a cat-and-mouse chase with Mascola's men before destroying the helicopter and killings its occupants. Police led by Bollin arrive and demand to know the location of the money. Shaft refuses, but implies he will be donating it to a child care clinic, as Asby had always intended.

== Cast ==
- Richard Roundtree as John Shaft
- Moses Gunn as "Bumpy" Jonas
- Drew Bundini Brown as Willy
- Joseph Mascolo as Gus Mascola
- Kathy Imrie as Rita
- Wally Taylor as Johnny Kelly
- Julius Harris as Captain Bollin
- Rosalind Miles as Arna Asby
- Joe Santos as Andy Pascal
- Don Blakely as Johnson
- Angelo Gnazzo as Lieutenant Al Rossi
- Robert Kya-Hill as Cal Asby
- Thomas Anderson as "Preacher"
- Frank Adonis as "Rip"
- Henry Ferrentino Detective Salmi
- Cihangir Ghaffari as Jerry (credited as John Foster)
- Melvin Green Jr as Junior Gillis
- Dan Hannafin as Cooper
- Marilyn Hamlin as Gus' Girlfriend
- Kitty Jones as Cabaret Dancer
- Evelyn Davis as Old Lady
- Gordon Parks as Croupier [uncredited]

== Production ==
Production studio MGM, confident that the Shaft series would be a success, started development of Shaft's Big Score before the original Shaft film was even completed. MGM rejected Ernest Tidyman's first submitted outline for the film, which he turned into the novel Shaft Among the Jews.

In contrast to the original Shaft, which was produced on a $500,000 budget, Shaft's Big Score cost nearly $2 million. Like Shaft, however, it was filmed entirely on location in New York City, with specific shooting locations including the Brooklyn Navy Yard and Cypress Hills Cemetery.

MGM attempted to get Isaac Hayes, composer of the soundtrack for Shaft, to score Shaft's Big Score, but negotiations broke down when MGM refused to pay Hayes the amount he demanded.

== Reception ==
=== Box office ===
After two weeks in five theaters, Shaft's Big Score! expanded to an additional 99 theaters and grossed $2,175,811 by the end of its third week. It went on to earn theatrical rentals of $4 million in the United States and Canada. It had a total $10 million gross.

=== Critical response ===
Roger Greenspun of The New York Times observed that "the new Shaft follows a new and glossier and tidier image, an image that is much more James Bond than Bogart." His review concluded, "Gordon Parks keeps improving as a technician, and 'Shaft' Big Score' is far more ambitious and professional than the original 'Shaft.' But it is also more mechanical and more exploitative of the material. And so it becomes less responsible, less detailed, less personal, less serious and less fun." Conversely, Roger Ebert awarded the film 3 stars out of 4, describing it as "mass-audience escapist entertainment" that works better than the original film did. Gene Siskel of the Chicago Tribune also gave the film 3 stars out of 4 and wrote, "The 'Shaft' series works, and will continue to work, because John Shaft is black, beautiful (to women), and a winner." Arthur D. Murphy of Variety stated, "The first 'Shaft' had a running-scared excitement not only in the characters, but also throughout the whole picture. The new film seems more self-conscious, contrived, ambitious, and sluggish." Kevin Thomas of the Los Angeles Times wrote, "As pure escapist fare it's every bit as successful as 'Shaft.'" Gary Arnold of The Washington Post panned the film as "strenuous but unimaginative," expressing disappointment that the filmmakers didn't "attempt to do a little more the second time around—maybe give the hero some more humor and dimension and his adventures more scope and relevance." He also called the absence of Isaac Hayes' score "a crucial loss ... You really miss that sound, which gave 'Shaft' a persistent, rhythmic drive and undercurrent." Clyde Jeavons of The Monthly Film Bulletin wrote, "It's efficient, exciting in a predictable, routine way, and excessively violent (with the emphasis on pyrotechnics, beatings and messy bullet-holes); but plot-wise it's patently absurd, with Shaft's invulnerability attaining supernatural proportions in the climax, as he makes life as easy as possible for his murderous opponents by scampering about suicidally in front of their machine guns, which he survives with nary a scratch."

On review aggregation website Rotten Tomatoes, the film holds a "rotten" rating of 58% based on 12 reviews.

== Release ==
Shaft's Big Score! premiered in New York City on June 21, 1972. The film was released on DVD initially on June 6, 2000, then August 30, 2005, and finally January 31, 2006 by Warner Home Video. It was included on a Blu-ray as part of the 2022 Criterion Collection 4K release of the first film.

== See also ==
- List of American films of 1972
