= Shafting =

Shafting may refer to:

- Roof_and_tunnel_hacking#Shafting

== See also ==
- Shaft (disambiguation)
