= Street People (film) =

1976 film by Maurizio Lucidi

- US film poster
- Italian: Gli esecutori
- Directed by: Maurizio Lucidi
- Screenplay by: Gianfranco Bucceri; Roberto Leoni; Nicola Badalucco; Maurizio Lucidi; Ernest Tidyman; Randal Kleiser
- Story by: Gianfranco Bucceri; Roberto Leoni
- Produced by: Manolo Bolognini; Luigi Borghese
- Starring: Roger Moore; Stacy Keach; Ivo Garrani; Fausto Tozzi; Ettore Manni
- Cinematography: Aiace Parolin
- Edited by: Renzo Lucidi
- Music by: Luis Enriquez Bacalov
- Production company: Aetos Produzioni
- Distributed by: Agora Cinematografica
- Release date: 30 March 1976 (Italy)
- Running time: 105 minutes (Italy); 92 minutes (US)
- Country: Italy
- Box office: ₤458,098 million

Street People (Italian: Gli esecutori, lit. 'The Executors', also released as The Sicilian Cross) is a 1976 Italian poliziottesco film directed and co-written by Maurizio Lucidi. It stars Roger Moore as a mob lawyer and Stacy Keach as his sidekick, a racecar driver, who are tasked with investigating a drug shipment. The cast also features Ivo Garrani, Fausto Tozzi, and Ettore Manni. The music score was composed by Luis Enriquez Bacalov.

== Plot ==
Ulysses is the nephew and consigliere of San Francisco mafia don Salvatore Francesco. The Don sponsors the import of a large, priceless crucifix from his hometown in Sicily. However, seemingly unbeknownst to him, the crucifix has been used to smuggle heroin, which is later stolen while in transit. Don Salvatore tasks his nephew with uncovering who planted the drugs and who stole them, and Ulisse teams up with racecar driver friend Charlie for the investigation.

== Cast ==
- Roger Moore as Ulisse “Ulysses” Francesco
- Stacy Keach as Charlie Hanson
- Ivo Garrani as Don Salvatore Francesco
- Fausto Tozzi as Luigi Nicoletta
- Ettore Manni as Bishop Frank Lopetri
- Ennio Balbo as Don Giuseppe Continenza
- Loretta Persichetti as Hannah
- Peter Martell as Pano
- Luigi Casellato as Pete
- Romano Puppo as Fortunato
- Aldo Rendine as Rocca
- Rosemarie Lindt as Salvatore's girlfriend
- Franco Fantasia as Father Domenico

== Production ==
Street People was filmed at Incir-De Paolis Studios in Rome and on-location in San Francisco and Agrigento, Sicily. The script was written by, among others, The French Connection screenwriter and Shaft creator Ernest Tidyman; and future Grease director Randal Kleiser.

== Release ==
Street People was released theatrically in Italy on 30 March 1976 where it was distributed by Agora Cinematografica. It grossed a total of 458,098,620 Italian lire on its theatrical release.

In the United States, it was distributed by American International Pictures, who cut 13 minutes from the runtime.

== Reception ==
The Evening Independent's film critic Jim Moorehead wrote: "The problem [of the film] is that the story line makes very little sense. Same is true with the editing. Ditto the dialog".

== See also ==
- List of Italian films of 1976

== Notes ==
=== References ===
- Curti, Roberto (2013). Italian Crime Filmography, 1968-1980. McFarland. ISBN 978-0786469765.
