= Richard Roundtree =

American actor (1942–2023)

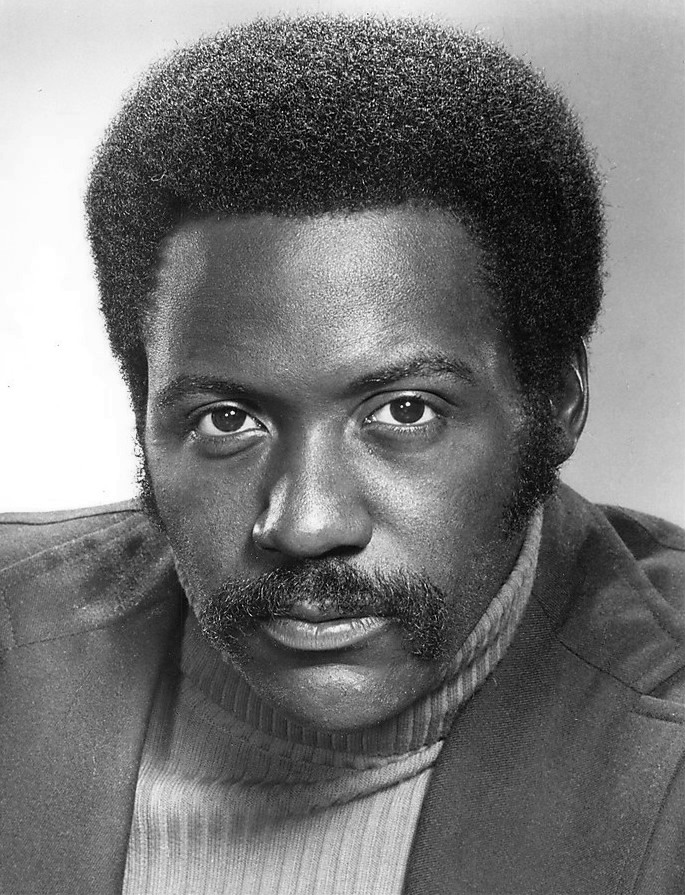
- Publicity photo, 1973
- Born: Richard Arnold Roundtree; July 9, 1942; New Rochelle, New York, U.S.
- Died: October 24, 2023 (aged 81); Los Angeles, California, U.S.
- Education: Southern Illinois University
- Occupation: Actor
- Years active: 1963–2023
- Notable work: John Shaft – Shaft
- Spouses: Mary Jane Grant (m. 1963; div. 1973) Karen M. Ciernia (m. 1980; div. 1998)
- Children: 5

Richard Arnold Roundtree (July 9, 1942 – October 24, 2023) was an American actor. He was best known for his portrayal of private detective John Shaft in the 1971 film Shaft and four of its sequels, Shaft's Big Score! (1972), Shaft in Africa (1973), its 2000 sequel and its 2019 sequel, as well as the television series (1973–1974). He was also known for featuring in several TV series, including Roots, Generations, and Desperate Housewives.

Considered "the first black action hero", Roundtree was credited with having an impact on the rise of African American leading actors in Hollywood projects, thanks to his successful performances in the genre. His portrayal of Shaft as a bold, confident, and charismatic figure also influenced cinematic depictions of black men and black masculinity, a contrast to black men in films prior to Shaft having often been portrayed as mild-mannered or servile.

== Early life and education ==
Richard Arnold Roundtree was born on July 9, 1942, in New Rochelle, New York, to John Roundtree and Kathryn Watkins. Roundtree attended New Rochelle High School, where he graduated in 1961. He subsequently attended Southern Illinois University in Carbondale, Illinois, but eventually dropped out of college in 1963, in order to begin his acting career.

== Career ==
Roundtree started his professional career around 1963, as he began working as a model at the Ebony Fashion Fair after being scouted by Eunice W. Johnson; he then began modeling in advertisements for products such as Johnson Products' Duke hair grease and Salem cigarettes. In 1967, Roundtree joined the Negro Ensemble Company: he then went on to play his first theatrical role by portraying boxer Jack Johnson in the company's production of The Great White Hope. According to J. E. Franklin, he acted in the Off-Off-Broadway production of her play Mau Mau Room, by the Negro Ensemble Company Workshop Festival, at St. Mark's Playhouse in 1969, directed by Shauneille Perry.

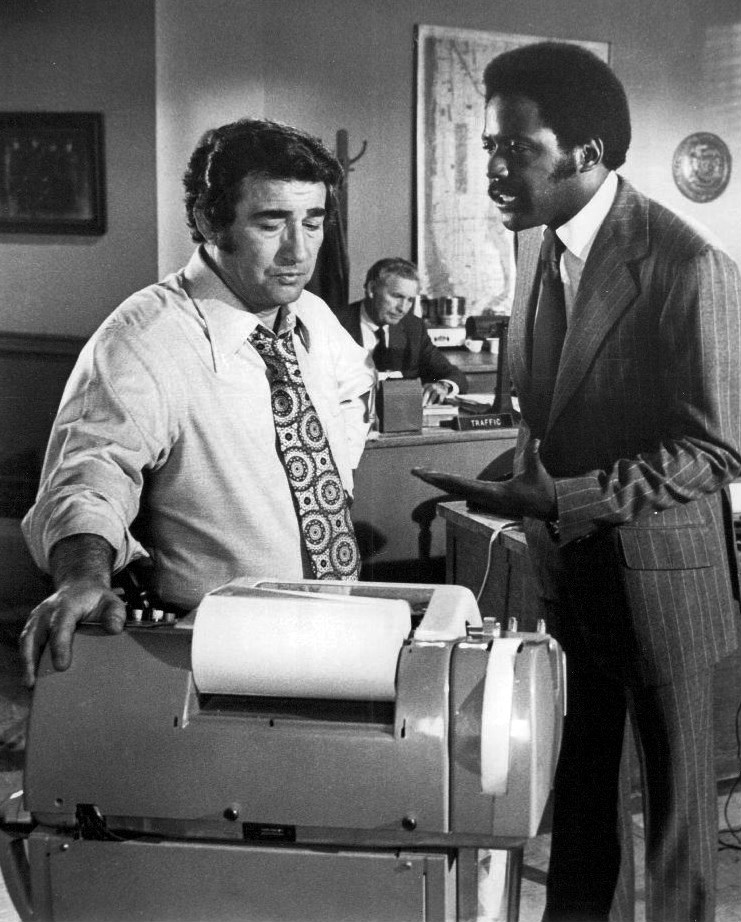
Roundtree playing John Shaft in the CBS-TV television series (1973)

Roundtree made his first big-screen appearance by playing a minor role in the film What Do You Say to a Naked Lady?, a 1970 American hidden-camera style reality film directed by Candid Camera creator Allen Funt.

In the following years, he became a leading man in early 1970s films, and gained widespread popularity through his portrayal of private detective John Shaft in the action movie Shaft (1971) and its sequels, Shaft's Big Score! (1972) and Shaft in Africa (1973); he also played the same role in the eponymous television series, aired by CBS between 1973 and 1974. In early-1974, Roundtree was cast in the role of an Evel Knievel-type motorcycle daredevil in the disaster film Earthquake, a part which was originally written for Joe Namath. Hired after filming had already begun, the script was re-written to accommodate Roundtree in the part, alongside Gabriel Dell and Victoria Principal. In 1981, he appeared opposite Laurence Olivier and Ben Gazzara in the epic war film Inchon, directed by Terence Young. In 1984, he starred again as a private detective, Diehl Swift, in the buddy-crime comedy movie City Heat, acting alongside Clint Eastwood and Burt Reynolds.

On television, he played the slave Sam Bennett in the 1977 television mini-series Roots, and then starred as Dr. Daniel Reubens in the soap opera Generations from 1989 to 1991. Although Roundtree worked throughout the entirety of the 1990s, many of his films from that era were not well-received publicly; however, he found success in several stage plays.

During that same period of time, Roundtree kept featuring in TV series: on September 19, 1991, he appeared in the episode "Ashes to Ashes", from the second season of Beverly Hills, 90210. In 1995, he acted in David Fincher's critically-acclaimed movie Seven; in 2000, he starred again as John Shaft in a new, eponymous sequel of the original 1971 film, with Samuel L. Jackson playing the title character. In 1997, he appeared in the comedy movie George of the Jungle; around the same year, he played a leading role as Phil Thomas in the Fox ensemble drama, 413 Hope St; in 1999, he portrayed Booker T. Washington in the 1999 television movie Having Our Say: The Delany Sisters' First 100 Years. He served as a voice actor for the title character from the PlayStation game Akuji the Heartless, which was first released in 1999.

In 2004, Roundtree guest-starred in several episodes of the first season of Desperate Housewives as an amoral private detective; in 2005, he played the assistant vice principal of a high school in the neo-noir mystery film Brick.

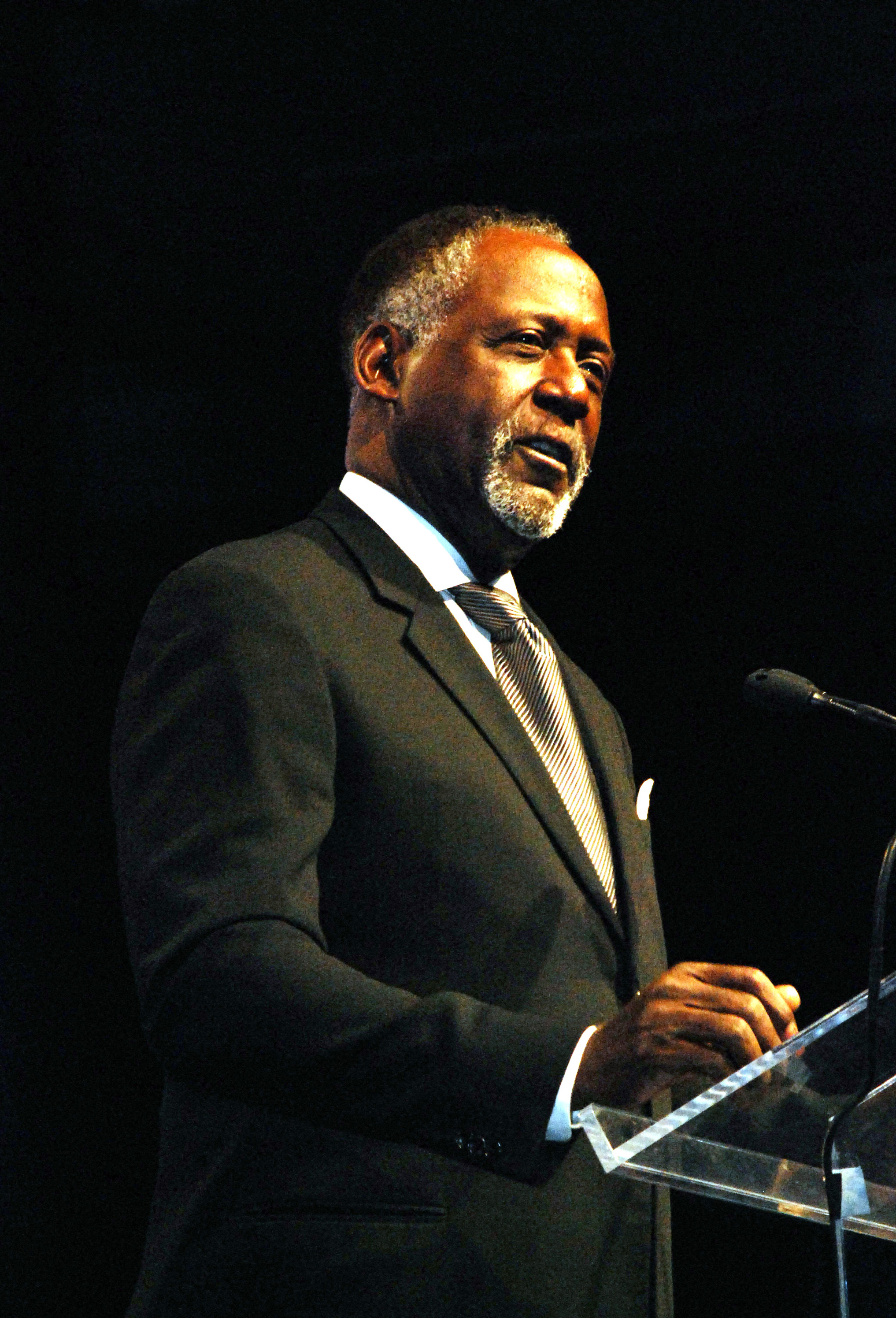
Roundtree in 2007

Starting from the same year, Roundtree appeared in the television series The Closer as retired colonel D. B. Walter; in 2006, he starred in the science fiction drama series Heroes as Charles Deveaux, the terminally ill father of main character Simone Deveaux (Tawny Cypress). He then appeared as Eddie Sutton's father-in-law in several episodes of family drama series Lincoln Heights, (Note: In season one, his car is rear-ended. In season two, he contemplates divorce.) before playing a supporting role in the 2008 film Speed Racer, a live-action adaptation of the eponymous Japanese manga. During the same year, he also appeared in the TV series Knight Rider as the father of FBI agent Carrie Ravai (Sydney Tamiia Poitier). Starting from 2013, he co-starred as the father of lead character Mary Jane Paul (Gabrielle Union) in the drama series Being Mary Jane, aired on BET.

In 2019, Roundtree co-starred in the comedy film What Men Want, before once again returning to the role of John Shaft in Shaft, a new sequel to the 2000 film, opposite Samuel L. Jackson and Jessie T. Usher, who portrayed John Shaft II and John Shaft III, respectively. Starting from the same year, Roundtree also had a recurring role on Family Reunion.

Roundtree's final film to be released in his lifetime was Moving On (2023) with Jane Fonda. Roundtree's final film was Thelma (2024), released posthumously.

== Personal life, health problems, and death ==
Roundtree was married and divorced twice and had five children. He married Mary Jane Grant in 1963; the couple had two children before divorcing in 1973. He dated actress and TV personality Cathy Lee Crosby shortly thereafter. Roundtree later married Karen M. Ciernia in 1980; they had three children together before divorcing in 1998.

In 1993, Roundtree was diagnosed with breast cancer, and subsequently underwent a double mastectomy and chemotherapy.

Roundtree died of pancreatic cancer at his home in Los Angeles on October 24, 2023, at the age of 81.

== Filmography ==
=== Film ===
Year	Title	Role	Notes	Ref(s)
1970	What Do You Say to a Naked Lady?	Interracial Couple		
1971	Shaft	John Shaft		
1972	Embassy	Richard "Dick" Shannon		
1972	Shaft's Big Score!	John Shaft		
1973	Charley One-Eye	The Black Man		
1973	Shaft in Africa	John Shaft		
1974	Earthquake	Miles Quade		
1975	Man Friday	Friday		
1975	Diamonds	Archie		
1979	Escape to Athena	Nat Judson		
1979	Portrait of a Hitman	"Coco" Morrell		
1979	Game for Vultures	Gideon Marunga		
1979	Day of the Assassin	Fessler		
1980	Gypsy Angels	Dr. Carlson		
1981	Inchon	Sergeant Augustus Henderson		
1981	An Eye for an Eye	Captain Stevens		
1982	Q	Sgt. Powell	Also known as Q – The Winged Serpent	
1982	One Down, Two to Go	Ralph		
1983	Young Warriors	Sergeant John Austin		
1983	The Big Score	Gordon		
1984	Killpoint	Agent Bill Bryant		
1984	City Heat	Dehl Swift		
1986	Opposing Force	Stafford	Also known as Hell Camp	
1986	Jocks	Chip Williams		
1988	Maniac Cop	Commissioner Pike		
1988	Party Line	Captain Barnes		
1988	Angel III: The Final Chapter	Lieutenant Doniger		
1989	Miami Cops	Gamble		
1989	Getting Even	Dundee		
1989	Night Visitor	Captain Crane		
1989	Crack House	Lieutenant Johnson		
1989	The Banker	Lloyd		
1990	Bad Jim	July		
1991	A Time to Die	Captain Ralph Phipps		
1992	Bloodfist III: Forced to Fight	Samuel Stark		
1993	Body of Influence	Harry Reams	Direct-to-video	
1993	Sins of the Night	Les		
1993	Deadly Rivals	Agent Peterson		
1993	Amityville: A New Generation	Pauli	Direct-to-video	
1993	Mind Twister	Frank Webb		
1995	Ballistic	Harold		
1995	Se7en	District Attorney Martin Talbot		
1995	Once Upon a Time...When We Were Colored	Cleve		
1995	Theodore Rex	Commissioner Lynch		
1996	Original Gangstas	"Slick"		
1997	George of the Jungle	Kwame		
1997	Steel	Uncle Joe		
2000	Shaft	Uncle John Shaft		
2001	Antitrust	Lyle Barton		
2001	Hawaiian Gardens	M.O.		
2001	Corky Romano	Howard Shuster		
2002	Capone's Boys	"Boom-Boom"	Also known as Al's Lads	
2002	Boat Trip	Malcolm		
2003	Men Cry in the Dark	Derrick's father	Direct-to-DVD	
2004	Max Havoc: Curse of the Dragon	Tahsi		
2005	Brick	Assistant Vice President Trueman		
2006	Wild Seven	Lee Marvin / Cleetus Woods		
2007	All the Days Before Tomorrow	El Doctor		
2007	Vegas Vampires	Rick Apping		
2008	Speed Racer	Ben Burns		
2009	Set Apart	J.T.		
2010	The Confidant	Claude		
2012	The Trial of Ben Barry	Ben Barry	Short film	
2012	This Bitter Earth	Grady		
2015	Collar	Reverend Alonzo Sparks		
2018	Duke	J.T.		
2019	What Men Want	Skip		
2019	Shaft	John Shaft I		
2020	Haunting of the Mary Celeste	Tulls		
2022	Moving On	Ralph		
2024	Thelma	Ben	Posthumous release	

=== Television ===
Year	Title	Role	Notes	Ref(s)
1972	Parachute to Paradise	—N/a	Television film	
1972–1976	The Hollywood Squares	Himself (Panelist)	Recurring role (4 episodes)	
1973	Firehouse	Shelly Forsythe	Television film	
1973–1974	Shaft	John Shaft	Series regular (7 episodes)	
1974	The Dean Martin Celebrity Roast	Himself	Episode: "Telly Savalas"	
1976	Freedom Is	—N/a	Television special; voice role	
1977	Roots	Sam Bennett	Television miniseries; Episode: "Part IV"	
1980	The Love Boat	Dave Wilbur	2 episodes	
1980	Miss Universe Pageant	Himself (Judge)	Television special	
1981	CHiPs	Sergeant Aikens	Episode: "Sharks"	
1983	Magnum, P.I.	Peter Jordan	Episode: "Two Birds of a Feather"	
1983	Masquerade	Willy "Mean Willy" Walters	Episode: "Pilot"	
1983	Just an Overnight Guest	Matt	Television short	
1984	The Baron and the Kid	'Frosty'	Television film	
1985	A.D.	Serpenius	Television miniseries (5 episodes)	
1985	Hollywood Beat	Don Julian	Episode: "Double Exposure"	
1986	The Fifth Missile	Commander Frederick Bryce	Television film	
1986	Ebony/Jet Showcase	Himself	1 episode (October 24)	
1986–1987	Outlaws	Isaiah "Ice" McAdams	Series regular (12 episodes)	
1987	The New Hollywood Squares	Himself (Panelist)	Episode: "03.23.1987"	
1988	ABC Afterschool Specials	Jason Ruigh	Episode: "Daddy Can't Read"	
1988	Cadets	Sergeant Matt Gideon	Television film	
1988	Murder, She Wrote	Major Kevin Cooper	Episode: "The Last Flight of the Dixie Damsel"	
1989	A Different World	Clinton Reese	2 episodes	
1989	Amen	Sergeant Burke	2 episodes	
1989	Beauty and the Beast	Cleon Manning	Recurring role (3 episodes)	
1989–1991	Generations	Dr. Daniel Reubens	Recurring role (6 episodes)	
1990	21 Jump Street	Ben Halley	Episode: "La Bizca"	
1990	MacGyver	R.T. Hines	Episode: "Tough Boys"	
1990–1996	The Fresh Prince of Bel-Air	Dr. Mumford / Reverend Gordon Sims	2 episodes	
1991	The Young Riders	Calvin	Episode: "Kansas"	
1991	Beverly Hills, 90210	Robinson Ashe Jr.	Episode: "Ashes to Ashes"	
1991–1994	Roc	Russell Emerson	Recurring role (4 episodes)	
1992	Hearts Are Wild	Xavier Burns	"Episode: #1.8"	
1992	Christmas in Connecticut	Prescott	Television film	
1992	L.A. Law	Judge Ira Menday	Episode: "Love on the Rox"	
1992–1994	Hangin' with Mr. Cooper	Sergeant / Chester Cooper	2 episodes	
1993	Bonanza: The Return	Jacob Briscoe	Television film	
1993	Moscacieca	Gray	Television film	
1994	Black Heart	Rodney "Rod"	Television film	
1994	Shadows of Desire	"Dunc"	Television film	
1994	Renegade	Gene Collins	Episode: "Thrill Kill"	
1995	Bonanza: Under Attack	Jacob	Television film	
1995	The Wayans Bros.	Dr. Saunders	Episode: "ER"	
1995	Dream On	Dr. Charles	Episode: "Little Orphan Eddie"	
1996	Touched by an Angel	Murray	Episode: "Rock 'n' Roll Dad"	
1996	Buddies	Henry Carlisle	Series regular (14 episodes)	
1997	Any Place But Home	Gil Oberman	Television film	
1997	Profiler	Detective James Henegar	Episode: "Power Corrupts"	
1997–98	413 Hope St.	Phil Thomas	Series regular (10 episodes)	
1998	Dr. Quinn, Medicine Woman	Jim "Barracuda Jim" Barnes	Episode: "The Fight"	
1999	Having Our Say: The Delany Sisters' First 100 Years	Booker T. Washington	Television film	
1999	Rescue 77	Captain Durfee	Series regular (8 episodes)	
1999	Linc's	Jake	Episode: "Real Time"	
2000–2001	Soul Food	Hardy Lester	Recurring role (6 episodes)	
2001	Resurrection Blvd.	Nate Khane	2 episodes	
2002	Joe and Max	Jack Blackburn	Television film	
2002–2003	As the World Turns	Oliver Travers	—N/a	
2003	1-800-Missing	Sam Haslett	Episode: "Father Figure"	
2003, 2004	Alias	Thomas Brill	2 episodes	
2004–2005	Desperate Housewives	Mr. Shaw	Recurring role (5 episodes)	
2005	The Closer	Colonel D.B. Walter	Episode: "Show Yourself"	
2005	Painkiller Jane	Colonel Watts	Television film	
2006	Blade: The Series	Robert Brooks	Episode: "Sacrifice"	
2006	Grey's Anatomy	Donald Burke	Episode: "I Am a Tree"	
2006	Close to Home	Cyrus Cater	Episode: "Prodigal Son"	
2006–2007	Heroes	Charles Deveaux	Recurring role (6 episodes)	
2007	Final Approach	Gary Markash	Television film	
2007	Point of Entry	Detective Miles Porter	Television film	
2007–2009	Lincoln Heights	Coleman Bradshaw	Recurring role (3 episodes)	
2008	Ladies of the House	Stan	Television film	
2009	Knight Rider	Lawrence Rival	Episode: "Day Turns into Knight"	
2009–2011	Diary of a Single Mom	Lou Bailey	Recurring role (18 episodes)	
2009	Meet the Browns	Frank	Episode: "Meet the Anniversary"	
2011	The Mentalist	Floyd Benton	Episode: "Bloodsport"	
2012	Private Practice	Raymond McCray	Episode: "The Next Episode"	
2013–2019	Being Mary Jane	Paul Patterson Sr.	Recurring role (33 episodes)	
2015	Chicago Fire	Wallace Boden Sr.	Recurring role (4 episodes)	
2015	The Player	Judge Samuel Letts	2 episodes	
2017–2018	Star	Charles Floyd	Recurring role (5 episodes)	
2018	Lethal Weapon	Don Bennett	Episode: "A Whole Lotta Trouble"	
2019–2022	Family Reunion	Jebediah McKellan	Recurring role (22 episodes )	
2022	Cherish the Day	Mandeville "MV" St. James	Main role (season 2)	

=== Video games ===
Year	Title	Role	Notes	Ref(s)
1998	Akuji the Heartless	Akuji	Voice role	

=== Stage ===
Year	Title	Role	Playwright	Venue	Notes	Ref(s)
1969	Mau Mau Room	—N/a	J. E. Franklin	St. Mark's Playhouse		
1976	Guys and Dolls	Sky Masterson	Frank Loesser, Jo Swerling, and Abe Burrows	The Broadway Theatre		
1977	Purlie Victorious	Purlie	Ossie Davis	Tiffany's Attic		Salem
2007	Whatever She Wants	Theodore Wolf	Je'Caryous Johnson	Spartanburg Memorial Auditorium	Recorded version released direct-to-DVD	

== Discography ==
- The Man from Shaft (MGM Records 1972)

== Awards and nominations ==
Association	Year	Category	Nominated work	Result	Ref
African-American Film Critics Association	2011	Legacy Award	—N/a	Won	
Golden Globe Awards	1972	Most Promising Newcomer – Male	Shaft	Nominated	
Indie Series Awards	2010	Best Performance by a Supporting Actor	Diary of a Single Mom	Nominated	
MTV Movie & TV Awards	1994	Lifetime Achievement Award	Shaft (film series)	Won	
NAACP Image Awards	1971	Outstanding Actor in a Motion Picture	Shaft	Nominated	
NAACP Image Awards	1998	Outstanding Lead Actor in a Drama Series	413 Hope St.	Nominated	
