= Akuji the Heartless =

1999 video game

- Developer: Crystal Dynamics
- Publisher: Eidos Interactive
- Director: Glen Schofield
- Producers: Sam Player; Jonathan Miller; Jeffrey Zwelling
- Designer: Josh Rose
- Programmer: David Minogue
- Artists: Rodger Ferris; Todd Gantzler; Damon Redmond; Steven A. Ross; Glen Schofield; Robb Waters
- Writers: Jim Curry; Eric Lindstrom
- Composer: Jim Hedges
- Platform: PlayStation
- Release: NA: January 22, 1999; EU: February 26, 1999
- Genre: Action-adventure
- Mode: Single-player

Akuji the Heartless is a 1999 action-adventure video game developed by Crystal Dynamics and published by Eidos Interactive exclusively for the PlayStation.

== Gameplay ==
Akuji the Heartless is a free-roaming 3D action game. The player character, Akuji, can attack enemies with retractable claws or use spells to set enemies on fire, summon demons, and possess the bodies of enemies.

== Plot ==
The game centres on the voodoo priest and warrior Akuji, who had his heart ripped out on his wedding day, and through the use of voodoo magic is now cursed to wander the Underworld. Kesho, his would-be bride, finds him in hell and speaks to him in soul form: she informs him that it was Orad, Akuji's own brother, who orchestrated his murder. She begs Akuji to escape and stop him, as their families are preparing for war, and Orad is preparing to sacrifice her to the gods.

Upon traveling through the first level of the Underworld and consulting loa Baron Samedi, Akuji discovers he has a chance for redemption: if he traverses hell and collects the souls of his ancestors, which the Baron despises for their evil, then he will grant Akuji safe passage out of the underworld. On his way through, he must also defeat the wardens of each of the vestibules of hell, which will enable him to advance on his quest for the souls.

After Akuji retrieves the Seal of Sadiki on the Baron's request, the Baron steals it from him and reveals he tricked Akuji into purging the souls of his ancestors so it would allow him to break free of his own imprisonment in the Underworld and exact his revenge on the mortal world while also making Kesho his servant once he sacrifices her. Kesho further confirms that the Baron had orchestrated Akuji's murder by possessing Orad and had also earlier used her voice to lead Akuji to him. Akuji engages the Baron in one last battle and succeeds, rescuing Kesho who in turn restores Akuji's heart, sending both Akuji and Kesho back to the mortal world.

== Development ==
Akuji the Heartless was built on the Gex: Enter the Gecko game engine. The game's titular character is voiced by actor Richard Roundtree.

== Reception ==
Reception

Aggregate score
Aggregator	Score
GameRankings	65%

Review scores
Publication	Score
AllGame	3/5
Computer and Video Games	3/10
Edge	5/10
Electronic Gaming Monthly	7.125/10 (Note: In Electronic Gaming Monthly's review, four critics scored Akuji the Heartless differently: 7.5, 6, 7, and 8.)
Game Informer	6.75/10
GamePro	3.5/5
GameRevolution	B−
GameSpot	6.2/10
IGN	8/10
Next Generation	3/5
Official U.S. PlayStation Magazine	3/5
PlayStation: The Official Magazine	4/5

Next Generation reviewed the PlayStation version of the game, rating it three stars out of five, and stated that "Crystal Dynamics has certainly provided gamers with a solid action title with enough imagination to please those who possess a penchant for the macabre. Yet the rough controls and animations keep Akuji from truly stepping into the genre's limelight."

The game received mixed reviews according to the review aggregation website GameRankings.
