= Brotherly Love (1985 film) =

- Film poster
- Genre: Drama; Thriller
- Based on: Brotherly Love by William D. Blackenship
- Screenplay by: Ernest Tidyman
- Directed by: Jeff Bleckner
- Starring: Judd Hirsch
- Theme music composer: Jonathan Tunick
- Countries of origin: United States; Canada
- Original language: English

Production
- Producer: Andrew Gottlieb
- Production location: Vancouver
- Cinematography: Bradford May
- Editor: David Rosenbloom
- Running time: 100 minutes
- Production companies: CBS Entertainment Production; Columbia Pictures Television

Original release
- Network: CBS
- Release: May 28, 1985

Brotherly Love is a 1985 American-Canadian television film directed by Jeff Bleckner, written by Ernest Tidyman and starring Judd Hirsch (in a dual role). It is based on the 1981 novel of the same name by William D. Blankenship. The film is dedicated to the memory of Tidyman, who died a year before the film's premiere.

== Plot ==
Affable businessman Ben Ryder and his understanding wife Donna are stalked by his murderous twin brother Harry, who has just been released from a mental hospital but still has a twisted obsession with money and the stock market.

== Cast ==
- Judd Hirsch as Ben Ryder / Harry Brand
- Karen Carlson as Donna Ryder
- George Dzundza as Lieutenant Conde
- Barry Primus as Detective Trelska
- Anthony Charnota as Genovese
- Josef Sommer as Mr. Rafferty
- Jay Brazeau as Dr. Hollis

== Production ==
The film was shot in Vancouver.
