= Leland L. Jones =

American actor and author

Leland L. Jones is an American actor and author of Djibouti Pier 17. He is also the senior pastor of the Greater New Light Missionary Baptist Church in Atlanta, Georgia.

== Partial filmography ==
- Kenan & Kel (1997)
- Truman Capote's A Christmas Memory (1997)
- Flash (1997)
- Nandi (1998)
- Mama Flora's Family (1998)
- Moving Out (1998)
- Waterproof (1999)
- Funny Valentines (1999)
- Selma, Lord, Selma (1999)
- The In Crowd (2000)
- The Runaway (2000)
- Losing Grace (2001)
- Domestic Disturbance (2001)
- Rustin (2001)
- The Locket (2002)
- The Naked Truth (2003)
- The Gospel (2005)
- Broken Bridges (2006)
- Daddy's Little Girls (2007)
- Tyler Perry's House of Payne (2008)
- Acceptance (2010)
- Meet the Browns (2010)
- Single Ladies (TV series) (2011)
- Shaft (2019)
- The Ms. Pat Show (2026)
