= Shaft (TV series) =

Series of TV movies

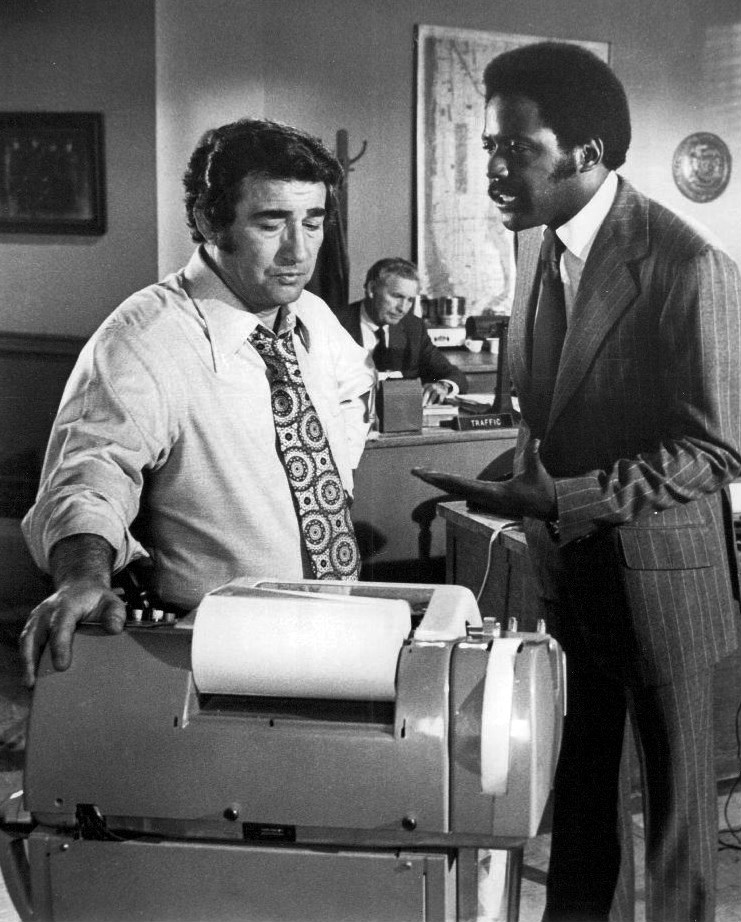
- Richard Roundtree and Ed Barth in "The Killing", 1973.
- Genre: Detective fiction
- Based on: Shaft by Ernest Tidyman
- Starring: Richard Roundtree
- Country of origin: United States
- Original language: English

Production
- Production company: MGM Television

Original release
- Network: CBS
- Release: October 9, 1973 – February 19, 1974

Related
- Shaft (2000 film)

Shaft is a television series that aired along with Hawkins during 1973–74 television season on The New CBS Tuesday Night Movies. Broadcast every third week, the series is a follow-up continuation of the three feature films that preceded its release. Starring Richard Roundtree as private detective John Shaft, it serves as the fourth installment overall in the Shaft franchise. Ed Barth costars as Al Rossi.

== Production ==
Because it was to be aired on over-the-air television, CBS felt that the narrative of Shaft needed to be toned down as compared to the original three films. Now instead of opposing the police, Shaft worked with them, creating conflicts with Hawkins starring cinema legend James Stewart, another police series with a starkly different viewership. Contemporary analysts suggested that since Shaft and Hawkins appealed to vastly different audience bases, alternating them only served to confuse fans of both series, giving neither one the time to build up a large viewership. A further contributor to its ratings failure was competition from other crime drama series starring African-American private investigators, NBC's Tenafly and ABC's Get Christie Love!. Richard Roundtree himself publicly expressed disdain for the small-screen version of Shaft.

== Episodes ==
No.	Title	Original release date
1	"Shaft and the Enforcers"	October 9, 1973
2	"Shaft and the Killing"	October 30, 1973
3	"Shaft and the Hit-Run"	November 20, 1973
4	"Shaft and the Kidnapping"	December 11, 1973
5	"Shaft and the Cop Killer"	January 1, 1974
6	"Shaft and the Capricorn Murders"	January 29, 1974
7	"Shaft and the Murder Machine"	February 19, 1974

== Cast and characters ==
- Richard Roundtree as Det. John Shaft:

A private detective working with the New York Police Department (NYPD). Roundtree reprises his role from the theatrical Shaft film series.

- Ed Barth as Lt. Al Rossi:

An NYPD police lieutenant working with Shaft. Barth replaces Angelo Gnazzo, who portrayed the character in Shaft's Big Score! (1972).

=== Overview ===
List indicator
- This table only shows characters that have appeared in three or more films in the series.
- A dark grey cell indicates that the character was not in the film or that the character's presence in the film has yet to be announced.

Character	Episodes						
Character	The Enforcers	The Killing	Hit-Run	The Kidnapping	Cop Killer	The Capricorn Murders	The Murder Machine
Character	1973				1974		
John Shaft	Richard Roundtree	Richard Roundtree	Richard Roundtree	Richard Roundtree	Richard Roundtree	Richard Roundtree	Richard Roundtree
Lt. Al Rossi	Ed Barth	Ed Barth	Ed Barth	Ed Barth	Ed Barth	Ed Barth	Ed Barth
The Detective	Rudy Doucette	Rudy Doucette		Rudy Doucette	Rudy Doucette		Rudy Doucette
The Hood	Arnold Roberts	Arnold Roberts			Arnold Roberts		
Laura Parks	Judie Stein						Judie Stein
The Pit Boss		Nick Borgani	Nick Borgani				
The Sportsman			Robert Strong			Robert Strong	
Marshall Cunningham	Robert Culp						
Det. Sgt. Lew Turner	Richard Jaeckel						
Gerald Felk	Kaz Garas						
Juan Otero	Rafael Campos						
Charles Dawson	Noah Keen						
Judge McCormick	Dean Jagger						
Bobby	Michael Gregory						
Gordon Dana	Charles Boyd						
Walter Anderson	Maurice Hill						
Stan Burgess	Harv Selsby						
Dr. Helen Connors	Jeanne Sorel						
Sister Elizabeth	Diana Webster						
Jane Cunningham	Barbara Babcock						
Cathy Cunningham	Melissa Sue Anderson						
Court Member	Dusty Cadis						
Numbers	Peter Elbling						
Court Member	Bill Hickman						
Don Lewis	Richard Lawson						
Diana Richie		Ja'net DuBois					
Kyle Bruckner		Leonard Frey					
Sergeant Duff		Michael Ansara					
Sonny Bruckner		Michael Pataki					
Stanley Hollister		Henry Beckman					
Archie McGill		Ron Soble					
Victor Perrine		Jared Martin					
Captain Rigano		Val Avery					
Charley		Vito Scotti					
Jack Benjamin		Louis Guss					
Mrs. Richie		Royce Wallace					
Logan		Albert Popwell					
Selma Thomas		Jacque Lynn Colton					
Judge Graves		Michael Fox					
Judge Weinberg		Jack Bernardi					
Iggie		Lou Kane					
Bailiff		Benjie Bancroft					
Courtroom Spectator		Al Beaudine					
Court Clerk		Billy Beck					
Court Reporter		Dick Cherney					
Juror		George Holmes					
Passerby		Kathryn Janssen					
Workman		Danny Sands					
Gambler		Eddie Smith					
Detective		Nico Stevens					
Tom Oliver			Howard Duff				
Marcus Lowell			Percy Rodrigues				
Ann Lowell			Judy Pace				
David Oliver			Tony Geary				
Paul Hanson			Don Matheson				
Clifford Grayson			Tony Curtis				
Charles Harris			Nicky Blair				
Mona			Pat Delaney				
Secretary			Paula Shaw				
Pit Boss			Ted Jordan				
Jacquard			Jason Wingreen				
Mrs. Pattion			Shirley Anthony				
Hoods			Fred Carson				
Hoods			Bill Catching				
Croupiers			Sig Frohlich				
Croupiers			Joseph La Cava				
Dealer			Bob Harks				
Club Patrons			Eddie Garrett				
Club Patrons			Robert Hitchcock				
Club Patrons			Joe Pine				
Bartender			Shep Houghton				
Eddie Simmons			Charlie Picerni				
Pit Boss			Hank Robinson				
Crouper			George Washburn				
Elliot Williamson				Paul Burke			
Nancy Williamson				Karen Carlson			
Matthew Potter				Nicholas A. Beauvy			
Beck				Greg Mullavey			
Hayden				Timothy Scott			
Leo				Vic Brandt			
Sheriff Bradley				Frank Marth			
Deputy Walter				Philip Kenneally			
Deputy Daley				Erik Holland			
Deputy Milton				Frank Whiteman			
Mr. Tolliver				Stephen Coit			
Debbie				Jayne Kennedy			
Potter				Richard Stahl			
Cab Driver				Joseph Petrullo			
Bank Customer				Robert Casper			
Wally Doyle					George Maharis		
Officer Charles Tyler					James A. Watson Jr.		
Tom Donegan					Richard Schaal		
Brock					Arch Johnson		
Marcia Tyler					Kim Hamilton		
Eve					Talya Ferro		
Capt. Brian Brewster					Darren McGavin		
Dr. Meyer					Gene Elman		
Helen Rossi					Mitzi Hoag		
Tony					Max Gail		
Marks					Joseph George		
Cargill					Peter Canon		
Bartender					Vic Christy		
J. L. Teague						Don Knight	
Gil Kirkwood						David Hedison	
Joanna Kirkwood						Cathy Lee Crosby	
Harry Praeger						Robert Phillips	
Fire Investigator						Bert Freed	
Frank Lucas						Arthur O'Connell	
Bank Clerk						June Dayton	
Bank Officer						Dean Harens	
Myrna						Candice Rialson	
Carol						Thelma Pelish	
Nicky						Jo Ella Deffenbaugh	
Police Officer						David Armstrong	
Franklin Carter						George Bryson	
Boermer						Edward Colmans	
Gunther						Gil Perkins	
Detective						Ray Pourchot	
Intern						Walter Smith	
Richard Quayle							Clu Gulager
Louise Quayle							Fionnula Flanagan
Henry Kassner							Mills Watson
Gerald Wallace							Joe Warfield
Frank Higget							Sheldon Allman
Plainclothesmen							John Garwood
Plainclothesmen							Glenn Robards
Bookie							Danny Wells
Moon							Bill Walker
Girl							Janice Durkin
Higget's Bodyguard							Sid Haig
Corman							Than Wyenn
