= Shaft (2019 film) =

Film directed by Tim Story

- Theatrical release poster
- Directed by: Tim Story
- Written by: Kenya Barris; Alex Barnow
- Based on: John Shaft; 1970 novel by Ernest Tidyman
- Produced by: John Davis
- Starring: Samuel L. Jackson; Jessie T. Usher; Regina Hall; Alexandra Shipp; Richard Roundtree
- Cinematography: Larry Blanford
- Edited by: Peter S. Elliot
- Music by: Christopher Lennertz
- Production companies: New Line Cinema; Netflix; Davis Entertainment; Khalabo Ink Society
- Distributed by: Warner Bros. Pictures (United States and Canada); Netflix (International)
- Release date: June 14, 2019 (United States)
- Running time: 112 minutes
- Country: United States
- Language: English
- Budget: $30–35 million
- Box office: $21.4 million

Shaft is a 2019 American action comedy film directed by Tim Story and written by Kenya Barris and Alex Barnow. The film stars Samuel L. Jackson, Jessie T. Usher, Regina Hall, and Richard Roundtree. It is the fifth film in the Shaft series, a sequel to the 2000 film with the same title, and was also Roundtree's final portrayal of the original eponymous character John Shaft Sr. before his death in 2023.

The film was released theatrically in the United States on June 14, 2019, by New Line Cinema, and digitally in global markets on June 28, 2019, by Netflix. It received mixed-to-negative reviews from critics and underperformed at the box office.

== Plot ==
In 1989, NYPD Detective John Shaft, his wife Maya, and their infant son JJ Shaft survive an assassination attempt by drug lord Pierro "Gordito" Carrera. Concerned for their safety, Maya divorces Shaft, moves upstate, and raises JJ on her own.

Twenty-five years later, Shaft has become a private investigator, and JJ is a rookie FBI analyst. JJ's childhood friend and ex-United States Army soldier Karim appears to die of a heroin overdose, but doctor and love interest Sasha concludes he was murdered. JJ turns to his father for aid. Shaft agrees to help, believing JJ's case may lead him to Gordito.

The Shafts surveil "Brothers Watching Brothers", the drug rehab clinic Karim founded with fellow ex-soldiers. They learn that Karim stopped going to rehab in favor of attending services at a mosque. JJ and Shaft investigate Bennie Rodriguez, who donated $500,000 to the mosque.

Meanwhile, Maya and John also reunite after not seeing each other since their divorce. Despite resumed tensions between the two, it is also revealed that Maya and John, after the divorce, had agreed that the latter would keep an eye on their son when he moved to New York. The reminder of that promise forces John to remember his responsibility as JJ's father.

JJ and Sasha track Bennie to an abandoned warehouse and uncover the operation: "Brothers Watching Brothers" smuggles drugs from overseas, Gordito sells them, and Bennie launders the money. The ring donated to Karim's mosque to buy his silence, then later killed him when he threatened to blow the whistle. JJ is discovered by the smugglers; Sasha is kidnapped while JJ is rescued by Shaft.

Shaft introduces JJ to his grandfather, John Shaft Sr (revealed to be Shaft's father and was pretending to be an uncle), who provides them with plenty of weapons. The trio assault Gordito's penthouse and kill the smugglers, avenging Karim's death. JJ rescues Sasha before being confronted at gunpoint by Gordito. Gordito attempts to shoot JJ but Shaft takes the bullet and shoots Gordito, who falls through a window to his death.

In the aftermath, Shaft recovers in the hospital and Bennie is arrested. JJ and Sasha kiss and begin a relationship. JJ joins his father and grandfather in their PI business. The three generations of Shafts strut on the road together.

== Cast ==
- Samuel L. Jackson as John Shaft II, a private investigator and ex-NYPD Detective, father of JJ Shaft, and son (Note: The 2000 film presented Jackson's Shaft as the nephew of the original John Shaft; this film retcons him into being his son, mentioning that Sr had lied to his son for decades by pretending to be his uncle. The 2000 film originally planned to have Jackson's Shaft as his son, until executives demanded to reduce the original John Shaft's role and make him an uncle.) of John Shaft Sr
- Jessie T. Usher as John "J.J." Shaft III, an FBI computer analyst, estranged son of John Shaft and grandson of John Shaft Sr, whom he meets for the first time since he was a baby.
  - Jordan Preston Carter as young JJ
- Regina Hall as Maya Babanikos, JJ's mother and John Shaft's ex-wife
- Alexandra Shipp as Dr. Sasha Arias MD, JJ's female best friend and love interest.
  - Nyah Marie Johnson as young Sasha
- Matt Lauria as Major Gary Cutworth, Karim's partner in the rehab centre
- Titus Welliver as Special Agent Vietti, JJ's FBI boss
- Cliff "Method Man" Smith as Freddy P., an acquaintance of John Shaft
- Richard Roundtree as John Shaft Sr., a legendary private investigator, father of John Shaft, and grandfather of JJ Shaft

Isaach de Bankolé portrays Pierro "Gordito" Carrera, a drug lord. Avan Jogia portrays Karim Hassan, JJ's male best friend, a recovering addict helping fellow returning soldiers. Joey Mekyten portrays a young Karim. Lauren Vélez portrays Bennie Rodriguez, Gordito's money launderer. In addition, Cutworth's criminal partners at the rehab center are played by Robbie Jones as Sergeant Keith Williams, and Aaron Dominguez as Staff Sergeant Eddie Dominguez (Bennie's cousin), with Leland Jones appearing as Maya's date Ron, while Baby and Sugar, JJ's new friends at the club, are played by Chivonne Michelle and Tashiana Washington, respectively. Adrienne C. Moore as Ms. Pepper the cab driver.

== Production ==
On February 18, 2015, it was announced that New Line Cinema had acquired the rights to the Shaft franchise, featuring detective character John Shaft, and would develop a new film within the series, along with producer John Davis of Davis Entertainment. On July 28, 2015, it was reported that Kenya Barris and Alex Barnow would write the script for the new film, which would also be produced by Ira Napoliello, and on January 20, 2017, the studio hired Tim Story to direct. On August 18, 2017, Jessie T. Usher was cast to play the film's new lead, the son of Samuel L. Jackson's John Shaft II from the 2000 film, while Richard Roundtree and Jackson were set to reprise their previous franchise roles.

In October 2017, Netflix signed a deal with New Line Cinema to cover more than half of the film's $30 million budget in exchange for the rights, which allowed Netflix to release the film on its platform outside of the United States two weeks after the theatrical release in the U.S.

Filming began in February 2018, and wrapped up in the early part of the year. The cast went back to re-shoot a few scenes in Atlanta in August 2018.

== Release ==
Shaft was theatrically released in the United States on June 14, 2019, by Warner Bros. Pictures. Netflix released it internationally on June 28, 2019.

== Reception ==
=== Box office ===
Shaft was released alongside Men in Black: International, as well as the wider expansion of Late Night in the United States and Canada. It was initially projected to gross $17–20 million from 2,950 theaters in its opening weekend. However, after the film only brought in $2.7 million on its first official release day, which included $600,000 from Thursday night previews, projections were lowered to $7 million. The film went on to gross $21.3 million, grossing $8.3 million in its debut week and another $3.6 million in its second weekend.

=== Critical response ===
On Rotten Tomatoes, the film holds an approval rating of 34% based on 130 reviews, with an average rating of 4.8/10. The website's critical consensus reads: "Decades removed from the original, this multi-generational Shaft struggles to keep its characters interesting -- or anything other than uncomfortably outdated." On Metacritic, the film has a weighted average score of 40 out of 100, based on 32 critics, indicating "mixed or average reviews". Audiences polled by CinemaScore gave the film a grade of "A" on an A+ to F scale, while those at PostTrak gave it an average 4 out of 5 stars and a 51% "definite recommend".

Writing for The A.V. Club, Ignatiy Vishnevetsky gave the film a C, writing, "With its groaner jokes and TV-pilot production values, the new film makes the last attempt at updating the character to contemporary action-hero tastes (in 2000's Shaft, directed by John Singleton) look downright old-school. And its identity crises go a lot deeper than the title it confusingly shares with two earlier films."
