= Wally Taylor (actor) =

American actor

- Born: July 14, 1930; Maywood, Illinois, US
- Died: October 7, 2012 (aged 82); San Antonio, Texas, U.S.
- Occupation: Actor
- Years active: 1967–1994

Wally Taylor (July 14, 1930 – October 7, 2012) was an American actor known for Rocky III (1982), Escape from New York (1981) and The Golden Child (1986). He also starred in the Arena Stage production of Before It Hits Home.

== Filmography ==
Film
Year	Title	Role	Notes
1970	Cotton Comes to Harlem	2nd Black Beret	
1972	Cool Breeze	John Battle	
1972	Shaft's Big Score	Johnny Kelly	
1974	Hangup	Sergeant Becker	
1975	Lord Shango	Memphis	
1976	The Gumball Rally	Avila – Dodge Team	
1979	When a Stranger Calls	Cheater	
1981	Circle of Power	Charlie Carter	
1981	Escape from New York	Controller	
1982	Rocky III	Clubber's Manager	
1986	Crossroads	O.Z	
1986	Night of the Creeps	Detective Landis	
1986	The Golden Child	Detective Boggs	
1990	Peacemaker	Moses	
1993	Hidden Fears	Bittie	(final film role)
Television
Year	Title	Role	Notes
1967	The Fisher Family	Pastor Owens	1 episode
1971	In Broad Daylight	Cab driver No. 2	Television movie
1971	The Bold Ones: The New Doctors	Willie Chambers	1 episode
1972	The Mary Tyler Moore Show	Walter Ellis	Episode: "His Two Right Arms"; Season 2, Episode 24
1972	Ironside	Vic Barry	1 episode
1973	Banacek	Ed Spencer	
1973	The Alpha Caper	Sergeant	Television movie
1973	The Odd Couple	Repairman	1 episode
1973–1976	Sanford and Son	Bill / Mr. Barrington	2 episodes
1975	Starsky and Hutch	Cook / Angie	2 episodes
1979	The Rockford Files	Policeman	1 episode
1980	Quincy M.E.	Earl	1 episode
1981	The Sophisticated Gents	Wally Griggs	3 episodes
1981	Falcon Crest		1 episode
1982	The New Odd Couple	Barney	1 episode
1983	The Renegades	Coach Riley	1 episode
1983	Knight Rider	Security Guard	1 episode
1983	The Dukes of Hazzard	Ira Grant	1 episode
1985	Seduced	Judge Warfield	Television movie
1985	Highway to Heaven	Carl Biggs	1 episode
1985–1987	227	Charlie / Charile / Building Inspector	3 episodes
1986	Fuzzbucket	Cop	Television movie
1986	A Fight for Jenny	Max	Television movie
1986	Hill Street Blues	Uninsured Driver	Television movie
1986	Cagney & Lacey	Mr. Simpson	1 episode
1986	Moonlighting	Bartender	1 episode
1987	St. Elsewhere	Al Harris	1 episode
1988	Santa Barbara	Dr. Merrick	1 episode
1989	Webster	Tom	1 episode
1989	Tour of Duty	Chaplain	1 episode
1992	Roc	Curtis Vincent	3 episodes
