= Jessie T. Usher =

American actor (born 1992)

- Usher in 2026
- Born: Jessie Tacoma Usher Jr. February 29, 1992 (age 34); Silver Spring, Maryland, U.S.
- Other name: Jessie T. Usher
- Occupation: Actor
- Years active: 2005–present
- Children: 1

Jessie Tacoma Usher Jr. (born February 29, 1992) is an American actor. He is known for playing Lyle on the series Level Up, Cam Calloway on the series Survivor's Remorse, and Reggie Franklin / A-Train in the superhero series The Boys (2019–2026). His film appearances include When the Game Stands Tall (2014), Teenage (2013), Independence Day: Resurgence (2016), Shaft (2019), and Smile (2022).

== Early life and education ==
Usher was born the son of Jessie T. and Judith Usher in Silver Spring, Maryland. Usher showed an interest in acting at the age of five after his sister Jesstia booked a TV commercial. His first acting job was an Oscar Mayer commercial. In 2003, the family relocated to Los Angeles to help further Usher's career. He graduated from high school at the age of 15. Usher joined Alpha Gamma Sigma and studied culinary arts in community college.

== Career ==
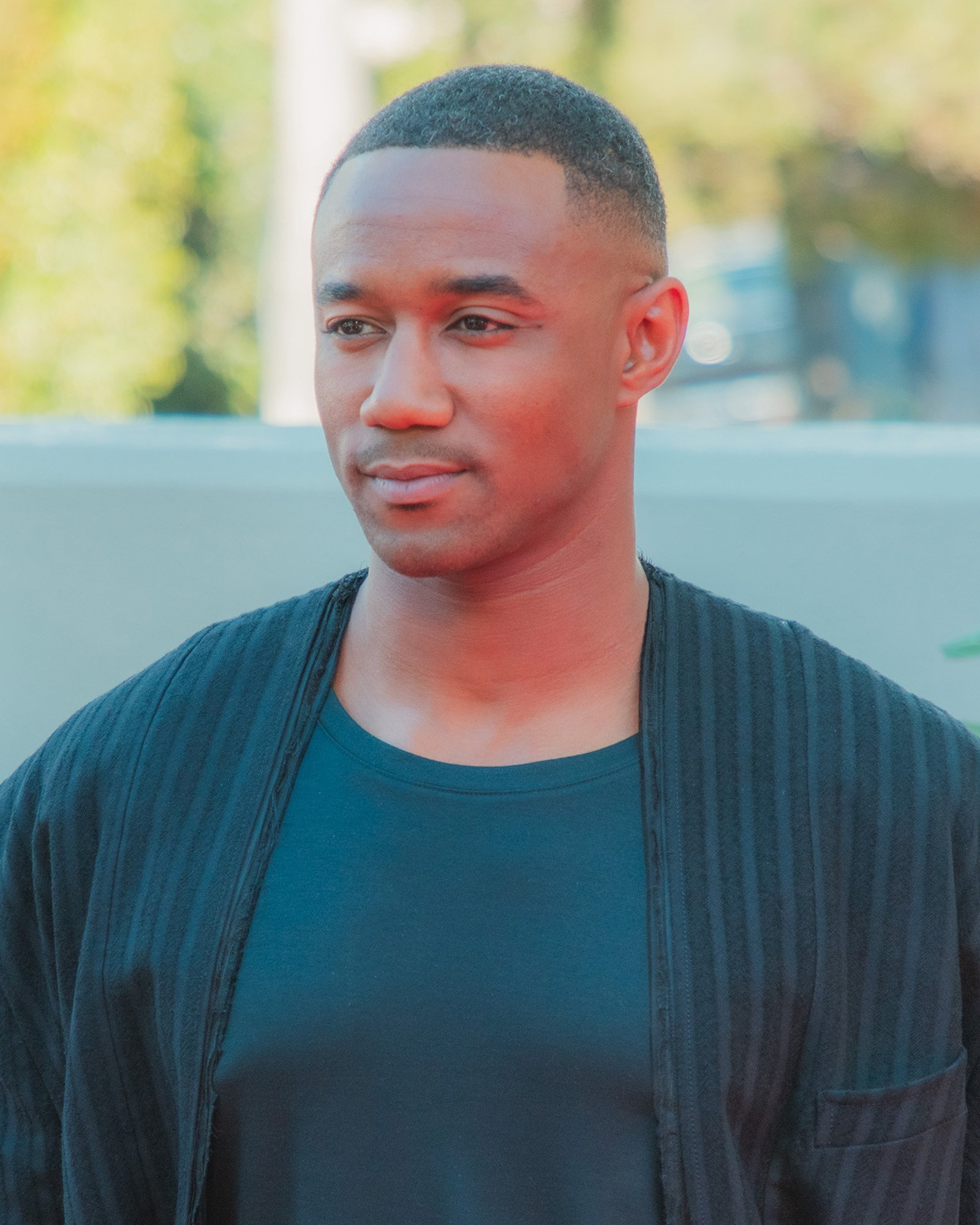
Usher at the 53rd Saturn Awards

Usher's first professional acting job was in an episode of CBS's Without a Trace in 2005. In 2007, he appeared in an episode of the Disney Channel original series Hannah Montana. In 2011, Usher starred in the Cartoon Network television film Level Up. The film spawned a television series in which Usher would reprise his role as Lyle Hugginson which lasted two seasons. He later voiced American Boy in the 2013 documentary Teenage. In 2014, Usher appeared in the film When the Game Stands Tall. In March 2014, Usher was cast as the lead in Survivor's Remorse, executive produced by NBA player LeBron James. The series premiered in October 2014.

In 2016, Usher appeared in Independence Day: Resurgence. Later that year, Usher co-starred in the Christmas themed comedy-drama Almost Christmas opposite Danny Glover and Kimberly Elise. In 2019, Usher played the lead in a sequel to the 1971 film Shaft, starring as the son of Samuel L. Jackson's character from the 2000 film, and the grandson of the original Shaft, played by Richard Roundtree.

In January 2018, it was announced that Usher has been cast as Reggie Franklin / A-Train in the Amazon Studios series The Boys, which is based on Garth Ennis and Darick Robertson comic book with the same name.

In April 2020, he starred with Camila Mendes in the Netflix film Dangerous Lies.

In September 2022, he appeared in the psychological horror film Smile.

== Filmography ==
=== Film ===
Year	Title	Role	Notes
2010	Beautiful Boy	Basketball Teen	
2013	Inappropriate Comedy	Jamal	
2013	Teenage	American Boy	Voice; documentary
2014	When the Game Stands Tall	Tayshon Lanear	
2016	All Part of the Game: Part 1 Freethrows	Jay	Short film
2016	Independence Day: Resurgence	Dylan Hiller	
2016	Almost Christmas	Evan Meyers	
2018	Ride	James	
2018	Stronghold	Lil Maniac	
2019	Shaft	John 'JJ' Shaft Jr.	
2020	The Banker	Tony Jackson	
2020	Dangerous Lies	Adam Kettner	
2021	Seal Team	Quinn	Voice
2022	Smile	Trevor	

=== Television ===
Year	Title	Role	Notes
2005	Without a Trace	Malcolm	Episode: "Neither Rain Nor Sleet"
2007	Hannah Montana	Guy	Episode: "Cuffs Will Keep Us Together"
2008	Lincoln Heights	Baby G	Episode: "Glass House"
2008	Numbers	Robber #1	Episode: "Frienemies"
2009	The Mentalist	Daniel Brown	Episode: "Red Rum"
2009	Criminal Minds	Daniel	2 episodes
2010	Summer Camp	R.J.	Television film
2010	G.I. Joe: Renegades	Ray	Voice; episode: "The Anomaly"
2011	Level Up	Lyle Hugginson	Television film
2011–2013	Level Up	Lyle Hugginson	Main role
2014–2017	Survivor's Remorse	Cam Calloway	Main role
2019–2026	The Boys	Reggie Franklin / A-Train	Main role, 32 episodes
2020	MacGyver	Vincent Broulee	Episodes: "Resort + Desi + Riley + Window Cleaner + Witness"
2022	Tales of the Walking Dead	Davon	Episode: "Davon"
2023–2025	Gen V	Reggie Franklin / A-Train	2 episodes
2025	Pulse	Sam Elijah	Main role, 10 episodes

=== Online ===
Year	Title	Role	Notes
2021	Vought News Network: Seven on 7 with Cameron Coleman	Reggie Franklin / A-Train	Guest role; web series promoting The Boys

=== Video games ===
Year	Title	Role	Notes
2024	Call of Duty: Modern Warfare III	Reggie Franklin / A-Train	Playable DLC Character; Voice and Likeness
