= Roger Greenspun =

American journalist and film critic (1929–2017)

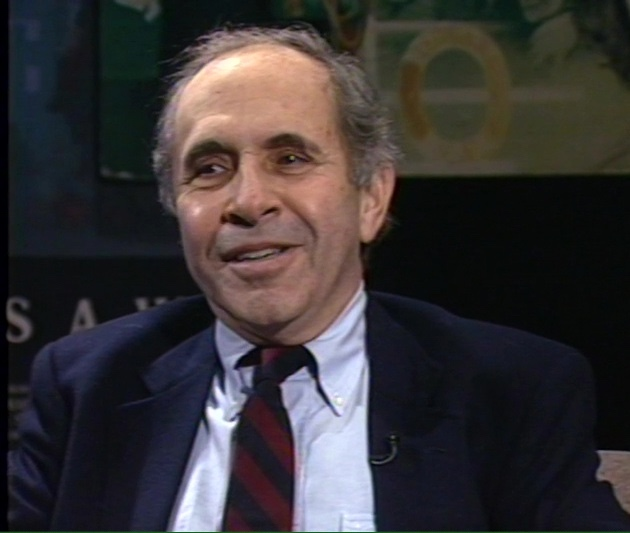
- Greenspun on CUNY TV's Cinema Then, Cinema Now (1991)
- Born: December 16, 1929; Bridgeport, Connecticut, U.S.
- Died: June 18, 2017 (aged 87); New York City, New York, U.S.
- Education: Yale University
- Occupations: Journalist, film critic

Roger Greenspun (December 16, 1929 – June 18, 2017) was an American journalist and film critic, best known for his work with The New York Times in which he reviewed near 400 films, particularly in the late 1960s and early 1970s, and for Penthouse for which he was the film critic throughout much of the late 1970s and 1980s.

== Biography ==
Greenspun was a member of the New York Film Critics Circle and in the mid-1970s served on the selection committee for the New York Film Festival. A graduate of Yale (B.A., 1951; M.A., 1958) and an instructor in English at Connecticut College from 1959 to 1962, he "began writing about film early in the Sixties, partly as a way of avoiding my Ph.D. dissertation, partly as a way of thinking about material that suddenly seemed as exciting as anything I had come across in English studies," he recalled. Greenspun was a professor of film history and criticism at Rutgers University from 1970 to 1995, as well as at the School of the Arts at Columbia University.

Greenspun, who also contributed to Sight & Sound, Film Comment and numerous other periodicals, published an article in 1974 describing the circumstances under which he left the Times, where an editor had deemed his tastes or writing too "intellectual" or "esoteric" for the paper's readership. Variety noted at the time that while Greenspun was "one of the first (and still one of the few) mass-media reviewers to have emerged from the film quarterly underground," his interests in film were wide-ranging and he was ranked 4th out of 26 New York reviewers appraised in Variety for their accuracy in reflecting films' commercial success.

Greenspun died on June 18, 2017, at the age of 87.

== Bibliography ==
- Greenspun, Roger (2001). "Cinema and Television". In Laqueur, Walter; Baumel, Judith Tydor (eds.). The Holocaust Encyclopedia. Yale University Press. pp. 119–127. ISBN 9780300138115. OCLC 46790189. Greenspun's short contributor biography mentions his reviews for the New York Times and Film Comment, and his teaching at Rutgers University and Columbia University.
