= Shaft (2000 film) =

American action crime thriller film by John Singleton

- Theatrical release poster
- Directed by: John Singleton
- Screenplay by: Richard Price; John Singleton; Shane Salerno
- Story by: John Singleton; Shane Salerno
- Based on: Shaft; 1970 novel by Ernest Tidyman
- Produced by: Scott Rudin; John Singleton
- Starring: Samuel L. Jackson; Vanessa Williams; Jeffrey Wright; Christian Bale; Dan Hedaya; Busta Rhymes; Toni Collette; Richard Roundtree
- Cinematography: Donald E. Thorin
- Edited by: John Bloom; Antonia Van Drimmelen
- Music by: David Arnold
- Production company: New Deal
- Distributed by: Paramount Pictures
- Release date: June 16, 2000
- Running time: 99 minutes
- Countries: Germany; United States
- Language: English
- Budget: $46 million
- Box office: $107.2 million

Shaft is a 2000 American action crime thriller film co-written, co-produced, and directed by John Singleton and starring Samuel L. Jackson in the title role with Vanessa Williams, Jeffrey Wright, Christian Bale, Dan Hedaya, Busta Rhymes, Toni Collette and Richard Roundtree. It is a sequel to the 1971 Shaft film, in which Jackson plays the nephew (retconned as his son in the 2019 film) of John Shaft. The film opened at the number-one position at the box office when it debuted June 16, 2000. It received mixed-to-positive reviews on Metacritic, with the critical consensus on Rotten Tomatoes praising Jackson's charisma.

== Plot ==
In 1998, called in to investigate the grievous assault of Trey Howard outside a restaurant, NYPD Detective John Shaft arrests Walter Wade Jr., the son of a wealthy real estate tycoon, after noticing blood on him. Wade claims self-defense. Shaft notices an injured waitress, Diane Palmieri, eyeing Wade, and unsuccessfully tries to coax a statement from her.

Trey's friend tells Shaft that when she and Trey entered the restaurant, Wade racially harassed him. Trey humiliated Wade back and left the restaurant, pursued by Wade. Shaft looks for Diane but she has left. Trey goes into a seizure and dies; when Wade mocks Trey, Shaft punches Wade in the nose, and does it again after being threatened with reassignment to another precinct. At the trial, the judge grants Wade bail of $200k. Wade later calls Shaft to thank him for breaking his nose since that's why the judge granted him such a small bail amount, and says he has fled to Switzerland.

Two years later, Wade returns to the U.S., and Shaft greets and arrests him, with the help of cab driver Rassan posing as Wade's limo driver. Shaft's friends throw him a celebratory party where the elder "Uncle" John Shaft appears, the same character from the 1971 movie, and warns him that Wade's wealth raises his chances of acquittal. While Wade is temporarily detained at police headquarters, Dominican drug lord Peoples Hernandez, whom Shaft previously arrested, befriends him. At the hearing, the judge has Wade surrender his passport and sets bail at $1 million. Shaft resigns from the police force, vowing to bring Wade to justice on his own terms.

Shaft searches for Diane with the help of friend and former colleague Detective Carmen Vasquez, but only locates her mother, Ann. Meanwhile, Wade offers his deceased mother's jewelry to hire Peoples to go after her. Peoples wants Wade to join him in his drug business, but agrees to the job provided that Wade sells the jewelry. Peoples hires Shaft's former colleague officers Jack Roselli and Jimmy Groves to tail Shaft; the pair reveal a snitch, "Tattoo", among Peoples' gang who had told Shaft what was happening, which results in Tattoo's death. Shaft and his former partner, Detective Luger, mug Wade of the money he gathered from selling the jewelry. He then plants the money on Roselli and Groves, and makes Peoples think they are double-crossing him. However, after getting word from People's younger brother that Shaft has left the scene, they follow him.

Having traced a phone call, Shaft eventually locates Diane, but Peoples' gang attacks them. In the shootout, Shaft kills Peoples' younger brother. Diane's brothers Mikey and Frankie arrive to retrieve her, but Mikey is stabbed by Peoples. Shaft, Diane, Rasaan, and Frankie regroup at Rasaan's apartment, but are secretly followed by Roselli and Groves. Diane tells Shaft her eyewitness account of Wade murdering Trey. Wade threatened her to keep silent, and she was forced to accept a payoff provided that she disappear. Meanwhile, Peoples angrily attacks Wade over his brother's death.

Roselli and Groves stake out Rassan's apartment but when Carmen arrives and starts asking questions, they shoot her in the chest. Peoples' gang attack, with Shaft shooting back at them to defend the group while Diane and the others flee. Roselli and Groves catch Shaft, who commands Carmen, who was wearing a bulletproof vest, to shoot them, which she does. Peoples and his gang pursue and end up crashing Rassan's car. When Peoples holds Diane hostage, Shaft persuades him to fight without weapons, but after a momentary faceoff, they both draw backup handguns, with Shaft killing Peoples first.

Shaft reassures Trey's mother Carla about the new trial conditions; however, when Wade arrives, she shoots him to death on the courthouse steps and is subsequently arrested. Back at the police station, Shaft reiterates to Carmen his preference to be a private detective. The two are then visited by John's uncle who stops by to visit. A woman then comes through asking them for help filing assault charges against her abusive boyfriend. Initially hesitant, Shaft agrees to help her his way. Shaft and his uncle go to confront the boyfriend, along with Rassan, whom Shaft presents with a new car.

== Cast ==
- Samuel L. Jackson as Detective John Shaft
- Vanessa Williams as Detective Carmen Vasquez
- Jeffrey Wright as "Peoples" Hernandez
- Christian Bale as Walter Wade Jr.
- Mekhi Phifer as Trey Howard
- Busta Rhymes as Rasaan
- Dan Hedaya as Detective Jack Roselli
- Ruben Santiago-Hudson as Detective Jimmy Groves
- Josef Sommer as Curt Fleming
- Lynne Thigpen as Carla Howard, Trey's Mother
- Toni Collette as Diane Palmieri
- Philip Bosco as Walter Wade Sr.
- Pat Hingle as Honorable Judge Dennis Bradford
- Lee Tergesen as Detective Luger
- Daniel von Bargen as Lieutenant Kearney
- Francisco "Coqui" Taveras as "Lucifer" Hernandez, Peoples' Brother
- Sonja Sohn as Alice, a Friend of Shaft
- Peter McRobbie as Lieutenant Cromartie
- Elizabeth Banks as Trey's Friend
- Lawrence Taylor as Lamont
- Andre Royo as "Tattoo"
- Gloria Reuben as Sergeant Council
- Richard Roundtree as Uncle John Shaft. Roundtree originated the John Shaft character in the 1971 film.

== Production ==
Singleton was a fan of the original film, which he said had wide appeal beyond its stereotype as a blaxploitation film, and he had sought to remake the film since he was young. Shaft started at MGM, but the studio did not like Singleton's vision: Don Cheadle as the son of the original Shaft. After crime films by Quentin Tarantino became popular in the 1990s, producer Scott Rudin took an interest in Shaft and suggested taking it to Paramount Pictures. Paramount picked up the project in 1997 after paying back MGM's development costs. Singleton said MGM balked at a $25 million film that they viewed as targeted to black audiences. Singleton and Shane Salerno wrote the original screenplay. Rudin vetoed the idea of a father-son team-up and brought in Richard Price to do rewrites, as he considered the original script to be too risque.

Rudin insisted on hiring a big name actor as the lead. Will Smith and Wesley Snipes were considered for the role of John Shaft. Snipes, responding to rumors that he was passed over, said he turned down the role because of the script, which he felt did not respect black culture or the original film. John Leguizamo was initially cast for the role of Peoples Hernandez. When Leguizamo left the production, Wright was cast. Singleton considered Lauryn Hill for the role of Carmen Vasquez. Jackson was unsure of accepting the role because he did not think of Shaft as being middle-aged, but he came to view his age as not an issue. With Jackson cast, the original Shaft was rewritten to be his uncle rather than his father to explain their smaller age gap.

Price's rewrites, and Rudin's insistence that they follow them, proved controversial with Singleton and Jackson. One point of contention was the lack of sex scenes, which had been a major element in the original film. Jackson attributed this change to political correctness. Another point was Shaft's involvement with the police. Price fleshed out Shaft's career with the police. Jackson praised Price's ability to write police procedurals but did not like how long it took for Shaft to become a private eye. Rudin thought it more believable for Shaft to be protected by his badge, but Jackson demanded that Shaft quit the police force earlier; Jackson prevailed, and the scenes were rewritten. Singleton was careful from early on to ensure the character was hip. He felt Price's rewrites got Shaft's attitude wrong and inserted the wrong kind of pop cultural references. Jackson refused to say some of the lines, believing them to be racially insensitive or untrue to the character, drawing Rudin's ire. When Singleton and Jackson criticized Price's action sequences, Rudin asked them to compromise by shooting twice: once according to Price's script and another as they wished, but Jackson was unwilling to risk having his objections overruled during editing.

Salerno described the post-production as "brutal" but said it came together despite the opposing views of the film. Roundtree's and Bale's scenes were reduced in editing. Rudin said Paramount forced them to reduce Roundtree's screen time, whereas one of Bale's fight scenes was deleted to give more time to Wright.

== Release ==
=== Critical reception ===
On Rotten Tomatoes, the film holds an approval rating of 67% based on 115 reviews and an average rating of 6.1/10. The site's critical consensus reads, "With a charismatic lead, this new Shaft knows how to push the right buttons." On Metacritic, the film has a weighted average score of 50/100 based on 33 reviews, which the site rates as "mixed or average reviews". Audiences polled by CinemaScore gave the film an average grade of "A-" on an A+ to F scale.

=== Box office ===
The film opened at the box office at #1 with $21.7 million, beating Gone in 60 Seconds and Titan A.E.. By the end of its run, Shaft had grossed $70.3 million in the domestic box office and $107.2 million worldwide, against a $46 million budget.

=== Merchandise ===
In 2000, McFarlane Toys released a Shaft (Samuel L. Jackson) action figure as part of their Movie Maniacs series three toy line. Accessories included are a handgun, sunglasses and a replica of the film's poster with a skulls and bones base.

=== Home media ===
Shaft was released on DVD and VHS on December 12, 2000.

== Soundtrack ==
A soundtrack containing hip hop and R&B music was released on June 6, 2000, by LaFace Records. It peaked at #22 on the Billboard 200 and #3 on the Top R&B/Hip-Hop Albums.

== Sequel ==
Despite having an identical title, the 2019 film acts as a second remake-sequel to both this 2000 film and the originals starring Richard Roundtree. The 2019 release stars Jessie T. Usher as J.J. Shaft, an FBI agent and the son of Samuel L. Jackson's character. Both Jackson and Roundtree reprise their roles, but the film retroactively reveals that Roundtree's character is actually the biological father of Jackson's John Shaft, mentioning that Shaft Sr. spent years pretending to be his uncle. Unlike the 2000 film and the 1970s trilogy, the 2019 installment received mixed-to-negative reviews and failed at the box office.

== Bibliography ==
- Aldous, Steve (2015). "Shaft Returns". The World of Shaft: A Complete Guide to the Novels, Comic Strip, Films and Television Series. McFarland. pp. 211–219. ISBN 9781476622231.
- Whipp, Glenn (2009). "Can Ya Dig It". John Singleton: Interviews. University Press of Mississippi. ISBN 9781604731156.
