= John Shaft =

Fictional private investigator

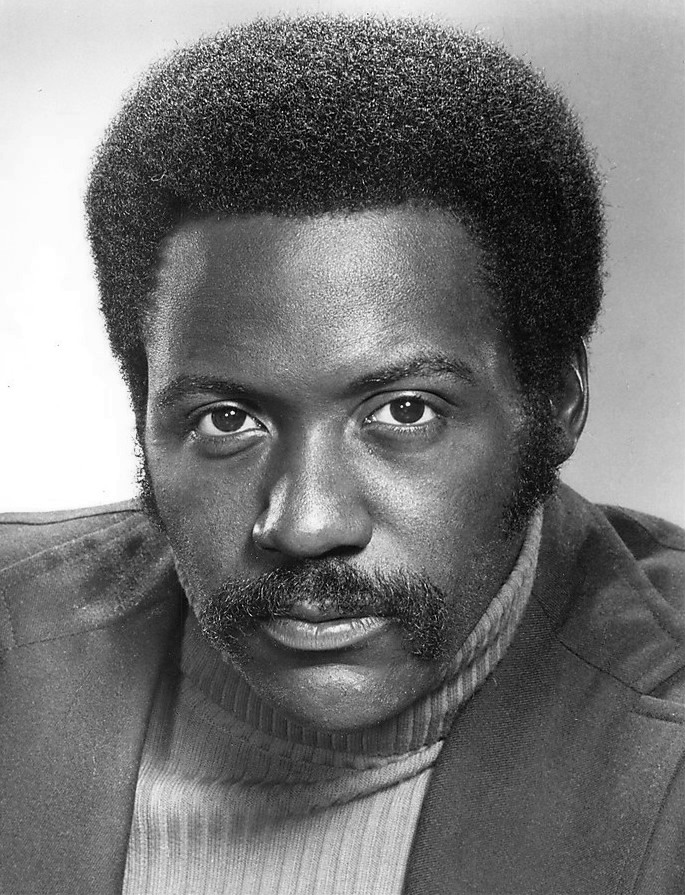
- Richard Roundtree as John Shaft in 1971
- First appearance: Shaft (1970)
- Last appearance: Shaft (2019)
- Created by: Ernest Tidyman
- Portrayed by: Richard Roundtree

In-universe information
- Gender: Male
- Occupation: Private investigator
- Family: John Quentin “Quick Johnny” Smith (father); Hazel Shaft (mother); John Shaft II (son); John "JJ" Shaft III (grandson)
- Nationality: American

John Shaft is a fictional private investigator created by author/screenwriter Ernest Tidyman for the 1970 novel of the same name. He was portrayed by Richard Roundtree in the original 1971 film and in its four sequels—Shaft's Big Score! (1972), Shaft in Africa (1973), Shaft (2000) and Shaft (2019)—as well as in the seven 1973–74 Shaft television films. Samuel L. Jackson portrayed his son (introduced as his nephew), named John Shaft II, in Shaft (2000) and Shaft (2019), and Jessie Usher portrayed the character's grandson (named John "J.J." Shaft Jr.) in Shaft (2019). The blurb on the paperback on which the original film is based states Shaft is "Hotter than Bond, cooler than Bullitt."

== Fictional biography ==
=== Abilities ===
John Shaft's weapon of choice is a Smith & Wesson Model 36, Beretta 92FS or an M1911 pistol. Shaft is also a practitioner of several styles of martial arts that includes western Boxing, Wing Chun, Judo, Jujitsu, Shotokan, and Kyokushin Karate.

== Shaft franchise ==
=== Novel series ===
The franchise began with the novel Shaft, which provides a much more detailed backstory for John Shaft than the one seen in the film series. All of the books in the original 1970s series are credited solely to Shaft creator Ernest Tidyman, but from Shaft's Big Score onward Tidyman wrote them with assistance from ghostwriters Robert Turner and Philip Rock.

- Shaft (1970)
- Shaft Among the Jews (1972)
- Shaft's Big Score (1972)
- Shaft Has a Ball (1973)
- Goodbye, Mr. Shaft (1973)
- Shaft's Carnival of Killers (1974)
- The Last Shaft (1975) - published only in England
- Shaft's Revenge (2016) (written by David F. Walker)

==== Recurring relationships in the novels and films ====
- Vic Anderozzi: A lieutenant of detectives with the New York Police Department, and Shaft's contact.
- Rollie Nickerson: Owner of the No Name Bar which Shaft frequents, and a part-time actor.
- Mrs. Klonsky: Shaft's Polish-American housekeeper.
- Mildred: The phone operator who handles Shaft's answering service.
- Ben Buford: A black revolutionary who grew up with Shaft.
- Marvin Green: Shaft's accountant.
- Helen Green: Wife of Shaft's accountant.
- Bumpy Jonas: A mobster turned ally.
- John Shaft II: Shaft's son. A brash, headstrong, and sharp NYPD detective who quits the force and becomes a private investigator after growing tired of corruption in the legal system. Appears in the 2000 and 2019 films.
- John Shaft III, a.k.a. "J.J." : Shaft's grandson. A nerdy, well-mannered FBI agent and computer expert who eventually opts to join his father and grandfather in their private investigations. Only appears in the 2019 film.

=== Comic strip ===
Between the release of the first Shaft film and the novel Shaft Among the Jews, Tidyman began developing a Shaft daily syndicated newspaper comic strip. He commissioned artist Don Rico, with whom he produced 24 sample strips, but despite the character's popularity in both novels and films he was unable to find a syndicate interested in distributing the Shaft strip, which remains unpublished.

=== Comic book series ===
The Shaft! comic book was published by Dynamite Entertainment, written by David F. Walker and illustrated by Bilquis Evely, beginning in December 2014. New stories following young John Shaft's earliest adventures were adapted closely from the Ernest Tidyman novels.

- Shaft: A Complicated Man (2014) (writer: David F. Walker, artist: Bilquis Evely)
- Shaft: Imitation of Life (2016) (writer: David F. Walker, artist: Dietrich Smith)

=== Film and television franchise ===
==== Film series ====
Year	Title	Starring
1971	Shaft	Richard Roundtree as John Shaft
1972	Shaft's Big Score!	Richard Roundtree as John Shaft
1973	Shaft in Africa	Richard Roundtree as John Shaft
2000	Shaft	Samuel L. Jackson as John Shaft (John Shaft II) Richard Roundtree as (Uncle) John Shaft (John Shaft I)
2019	Shaft	Jessie Usher as J.J. Shaft (estranged son of John Shaft and grandson of John Shaft Sr., John Shaft III) Richard Roundtree as John Shaft Sr. (John Shaft I) Samuel L. Jackson as John Shaft (son of John Shaft Sr., retcon, John Shaft II)

==== Television films ====
The television show ran from 1973 to 1974, with Richard Roundtree reprising the role of John Shaft. There were seven 90-minute movies, part of the New CBS Tuesday Night Movies, rotating with Hawkins, which starred James Stewart.

==== Cast and characters ====
List indicator
- A dark grey cell indicates the character was not in the film.

Character	Film					Television
Character	Shaft	Shaft's Big Score!	Shaft in Africa	Shaft	Shaft	Shaft
Character	1971	1972	1973	2000	2019	1973–1974
John Shaft (a.k.a. John Shaft Sr., John Shaft I)	Richard Roundtree	Richard Roundtree	Richard Roundtree	Richard Roundtree	Richard Roundtree	Richard Roundtree
Bumpy Jonas	Moses Gunn	Moses Gunn				
John Shaft (a.k.a. John Shaft II)				Samuel L. Jackson	Samuel L. Jackson	
J.J. Shaft (a.k.a. John Shaft III)					Jessie Usher	

== John Shaft in other media ==
- Burger King utilized the Shaft character for promotion, and even somewhat parodied Shaft utilizing Shaquille O'Neal.
- The USA Network's promo for their series Monk was modeled after the Shaft remake in 2000.
- Geena Davis parodied the Shaft remake/sequel in promos for her short-lived television series, The Geena Davis Show.
- In Season 2's episode "Ants in Pants!", The Tick featured the Tick meeting "Taft." On confirming that it is he, the man says "Darn right." This would be reprised in the Season 3 episode, "That Moustache Feeling".
- A song entitled "Shaft in Greenland" appeared on The Dead Milkmen's album Soul Rotation.
- In the TV series The Fresh Prince of Bel-Air, Will Smith frequently references Shaft as one of his favorite film characters, believing the character to be a real person. (Richard Roundtree himself guest-starred in two episodes of the show, playing two different characters.)
- In the anime TV series Cowboy Bebop episode "Mushroom Samba", he is the namesake of one of the Shaft brothers, hoping to avenge his brother's death. He is voiced by Hōchū Ōtsuka in the 1999 Japanese version and by Beau Billingslea in the 2001 English dub.
- Broomhilda Von Shaft, a character in Quentin Tarantino's Django Unchained, was named to suggest a relationship to John Shaft. Stated Tarantino: "Her and Django will eventually have a baby, and then that baby will have a baby, and that baby will have a baby, and that baby will have a baby, and that baby will have a baby ... and one of these days, John Shaft will be born".
- In the video game Vigilante 8: 2nd Offense, the character John Torque was modelled after John Shaft. The line "shut your mouth", heard in the main theme song of the game, is also a reference to the main theme of the movie Shaft, in which the eponymous character stars in.

== Parodies in other films ==
- Good Burger
- I'm Gonna Git You Sucka
- I Got the Hook-Up
- Black Dynamite
- The Hebrew Hammer

== Reception ==
The character has had a mostly positive response. Shaft had an enormous impact on the way Black men were portrayed in American film. Prior to Shaft many depictions of Black men showed them as servile, mild-mannered, and in positions of low status such as servants or janitors. The way Richard Roundtree portrayed Shaft created a Black male style that was so distinct and pervasive it became known as “swag”. After Shaft the representation of Black masculinity in American films was dramatically changed. It became the norm to see black men in roles that before would have been filled by white men.

== Literary references ==
- Tuska, Jon (1978). The Detective in Hollywood. Doubleday. ISBN 0385120931.
- Aldous, Steve (2015). The World of Shaft: A Complete Guide to the Novels, Comic Strip, Films and Television Series. McFarland. ISBN 9781476622231.
