= Shaft (novel) =

1970 detective novel by Ernest Tidyman

- First edition cover
- Author: Ernest Tidyman
- Language: English
- Genre: Detective fiction
- Publisher: Macmillan
- Publication date: 1970
- Publication place: United States
- Media type: Print (Hardback & Paperback)
- Followed by: Shaft Among the Jews

Shaft is a 1970 detective novel by Ernest Tidyman. It is the first novel in the John Shaft novel series. The novel debuted the character John Shaft and inspired both the 1971 film Shaft and its sequels.

== Plot ==
Shaft tells one of the adventures of John Shaft, a private investigator based in New York City.

== Background ==
Author Ernest Tidyman was at the time trying to transition from the field of journalism to fiction, after his first novel, Flower Power, had little success. Editor Alan Rinzler, who had worked with Claude Brown on the bestselling Manchild in the Promised Land, wanted a book to take the gritty realism of Manchild in the Promised Land and bring it into the mystery genre. At the recommendation of literary agent Ronald Hobbs, noted as one of the few black literary agents in the 1960s, Tidyman was commissioned to write Shaft in 1968. He started writing the novel in late 1968, finished it in 1969, and immediately started shopping the book's film rights in Hollywood, even though it would not see publication for nearly another year.

Shaft was first published in a hardback edition in April 1970.
