= Ernest Tidyman =

American writer (1928–1984)

- Born: Ernest Ralph Tidyman; January 1, 1928; Cleveland, Ohio, U.S.
- Died: July 14, 1984 (aged 56); London, England
- Occupations: Author, journalist, screenwriter
- Spouse: Chris Clark (m. 1982)
- Children: 2
- Writing career
- Notable works: Shaft; The French Connection

Ernest Ralph Tidyman (January 1, 1928 – July 14, 1984) was an American author, journalist, and screenwriter, best known for his novels featuring the African-American detective John Shaft. His screenplay for the 1971 film The French Connection garnered him an Academy Award for Best Adapted Screenplay, among other accolades.

Tidyman also wrote the scripts for the film version of Shaft (1971) and its first sequel Shaft's Big Score! (1972). He was twice nominated for the Primetime Emmy Award for Outstanding Television Movie for his work on the telefilms Dummy (1979) and Guyana Tragedy: The Story of Jim Jones (1980).

== Early life ==
Tidyman was born in Cleveland, Ohio, the son of Kathryn (née Kascsak) and Benjamin Ralph Tidyman, a crime reporter for The Plain Dealer. He was of Hungarian and British descent. He began his career as a copyboy in Cleveland when he was 14 years old, having dropped out of school in grade seven.

Tidyman enlisted in the U.S. Army in 1946, serving in public relations. He worked as a journalist and crime reporter for the next two decades in a number of cities, including a stint as editor of Diners Club magazine, and writing for The New York Times (1960–66), New York Post (1957–60), male magazines and black newspapers. In 1968 he wrote his first novel, Flower Power about hippies. He then decided to write about a black detective, Shaft.

== Career ==
=== Shaft and French Connection ===
He later said about writing Shaft, "Reading black fiction, you see that the central figure is either super hero or super victim, as in [William] Styron's book. The blacks I knew were smart and sophisticated, and I thought, what about a black hero who thinks of himself as a human being, but who uses his black rage as one of his resources, along with intelligence and courage."

His novel Shaft was read by Philip d'Antoni, who hired him to write The French Connection. According to that film's director, William Friedkin, "We think he has the potential to be a better than average thriller writer. [...] He writes people so that an audience can define characters quickly, but then complications begin to set in." Friedkin said he rewrote much of the script "But Tidyman's name will be first" on the credits. Friedkin's rewriting and credit grab annoyed Tidyman, who downplayed the director's contribution.

The dual success of Shaft and French Connection made Tidyman one of the top screenwriters in the business. "Tidyman from a standing start suddenly looks like a one man resuscitator for the movie as public entertainment", wrote The Los Angeles Times. Tidyman was one of the few filmmakers to speak up for the much-maligned James T. Aubrey, president of MGM, who financed Shaft. "Nobody ever lied to me at MGM or told me they were going to do something they didn't do", he said.

=== Producer ===
However, he was not happy with the final films, particularly Shaft, and decided to move into producing as well, establishing Ernest Tidyman Productions in 1971. Ernest Tidyman Productions was changed to Ernest Tidyman International, Ltd., in 1971 and back to Ernest Tidyman Productions in 1979. Tidyman also established Shaft Productions in 1972 to handle Shaft's sequels, Pilgrim Productions to handle Big Bucks, and Family Trouble Productions to produce an unmade film Family Trouble.

"You have to hyphenate", he said. "If you've got an idea, you'd better write it, and then you'd better produce it, so you can control it. This town depends more on the men who write, on the storytellers, than on anybody else, and it doesn't begin [...] to know how to deal with them rightly."

He wrote the screenplay for the 1973 film High Plains Drifter, directed by and starring Clint Eastwood. Tidyman also wrote the sequel to Shaft, Shaft's Big Score, which appeared in theaters in 1972.

In 1974, he published Dummy, a non-fiction account of the story of Donald Lang, an accused deaf-mute murderer. It was nominated for an Edgar in the Fact Crime category. He adapted the book into a 1979 TV movie starring LeVar Burton.

=== Later career ===
He co-wrote A Force of One in 1979, one of Chuck Norris's earlier films.

In 1980, he wrote the teleplay for the TV movie Guyana Tragedy: The Story of Jim Jones, which he also had a hand in producing, which got him an Emmy nomination. For creating the Shaft books, he became one of the few white individuals to win an NAACP Image Award.

"I write for money", Tidyman said in a 1980 interview. He got up at six am and wrote for 12 hours a day.

Tidyman summed up the three main elements of his craft as:

"Drama, usually in the event itself, clarity of the telling, and most importantly, energy: the energy that I am able to infuse into the same words that are available to anybody who knows the language and its structure. If I can tell a story in a way that contains energy – a force – I think it's fairly certain it will be told in an interesting way."

== Personal life ==
Tidyman married five times. He had two sons, Ben (adopted) and Nathaniel, with his third wife Ruth Rayle Tidyman. With his fourth wife, Susan Gould, he fathered two children – Adam and Nicholas.

In 1982, he married former Motown soul singer Chris Clark, who had co-written the screenplay for Lady Sings the Blues (1972).

=== Death ===
Tidyman died in 1984 in Westminster Hospital in London, England, due to a perforated ulcer and other complications.

== Books ==
=== John Shaft novels ===
- Shaft (1970)
- Shaft Among the Jews (1972)
- Shaft's Big Score! (1972)
- Shaft Has a Ball (1973)
- Goodbye, Mr. Shaft (1973)
- Shaft's Carnival of Killers (1974)
- The Last Shaft (1975)

=== Others ===
==== Fiction ====
- Flower Power (1968)
- Absolute Zero (1971)
- High Plains Drifter (1973)
- Line of Duty (1974)
- Starstruck (1975)
- Table Stakes (1978)

==== Non-fiction ====
- The Anzio Death Trap (1968)
- Dummy (1974)
- Big Bucks (1982)

== Filmography ==
=== Film ===
Year	Title	Director	Notes	Ref.
1971	Shaft	Gordon Parks		
1971	The French Connection	William Friedkin		
1972	Shaft's Big Score	Gordon Parks		
1973	High Plains Drifter	Clint Eastwood		
1973	Ghost in the Noonday Sun	Peter Medak	Uncredited	
1974	The Second Coming of Suzanne	Michael Barry	Script supervisor	
1975	Report to the Commissioner	Milton Katselas		
1976	Street People	Maurizio Lucidi	Dialogue	
1979	A Force of One	Paul Aaron		
1983	Last Plane Out	David Nelson		

=== Television ===
Year	Title	Notes	Ref.
1979-80	Eischied	Developed by	
1981	Walking Tall	Exec. story consultant; 6 episodes	

==== TV movies and miniseries ====
Year	Title	Director	Ref.
1978	To Kill a Cop	Gary Nelson	
1979	Dummy	Frank Perry	
1980	Power	Barry Shear; Virgil W. Vogel	
1980	Guyana Tragedy: The Story of Jim Jones	William Graham	
1980	Alcatraz: The Whole Shocking Story	Paul Krasny	
1985	Stark	Rod Holcomb	
1985	Brotherly Love	Jeff Bleckner	

== Unproduced screenplays ==
- The Beauty People (1970)
- The Inspector (1970) – for Fox, about a rogue police officer.
- Please Be Careful, Barney Noble (1971) – for his own company and United Artists.
- The Story of Donald Lang (1971) – for his own company and United Artists.
- Paternity Suit (1971) – TV movie for his own company and ABC.
- Piece of the Action (1971) – TV movie for Metromedia Producers Corp and his own company.
- The Second Coming of Suzanne (1971)
- Hero (1971)
- Forfeit (1974) – based on the novel by Dick Francis, with Tidyman to direct.
- Absolute Zero (1973) – from his novel starring Peter Sellers.
- Ruby Red (1974) – a film about country music for Ray Stark.
- The Sicilian Cross (1975) – about the Sicilian mafia.
- Fire and Ice (1976) – the story of Charles Revlon.
- Chennault: The Flying Tiger (1980) – TV movie.
- Agent Orange (1980) – TV movie for CBS.
- The Story of Nat Love (1980) – TV movie for CBS.
- The Snake (1980) – for Alfredo Leone.
- The Rock and Clarence Carnes (1980)

== Awards and nominations ==
Award	Year	Category	Work	Result
Academy Award	1972	Best Adapted Screenplay	The French Connection	Won
Edgar Award	1972	Best Motion Picture Screenplay	The French Connection	Won
Golden Globe Award	1972	Best Screenplay	The French Connection	Nominated
Primetime Emmy Award	1979	Outstanding Drama or Comedy Special	Dummy	Nominated
Primetime Emmy Award	1980	Outstanding Drama or Comedy Special	Guyana Tragedy: The Story of Jim Jones	Nominated
Writers Guild of America Award	1972	Best Drama Adapted from Another Medium	The French Connection	Won
