= List of 1970s films based on actual events =

This is a list of films and miniseries that are based on actual events. Films on this list are generally from American production unless indicated otherwise.

== 1970 ==
- A Baltic Tragedy (Swedish: Baltutlämningen) (1970) – Swedish drama film based on the Swedish extradition of Baltic soldiers that took place between 1945 and 1946
- A Bullet for Pretty Boy (1970) – action biographical crime film about Pretty Boy Floyd's escape from prison
- Airport (1970) – action drama film loosely based on the Continental Airlines Flight 11 suicide bombing
- The Andersonville Trial (1970) – drama television film based on the actual 1865 trial of Henry Wirz, commander of the infamous Confederate Andersonville prison, where thousands of Union prisoners died of exposure, malnutrition, and disease
- The Bloody Judge (1970) – biographical horror film loosely based on the story of Judge Jeffries, the Lord Chief Justice of seventeenth-century England, who, in this film, condemned women as witches to further his political and sexual needs
- Bloody Mama (1970) – crime drama film loosely based on the real story of Ma Barker, who is depicted as a corrupt, mentally-disturbed mother who encourages and organizes the criminality of her four adult sons in Depression-era southern United States
- The Ceremony of Innocence (1970) – historical biographical drama television film depicting a highly fictionalized account of the events leading up to Sweyn Forkbeard's invasion of England in AD 1013
- Chisum (1970) – Western biographical drama film based on the Lincoln County War of 1878
- The Christine Jorgensen Story (1970) – biographical drama film about trans woman Christine Jorgensen
- The Confession (French: L'aveu) (1970) – French-Italian thriller film based on the true story of the Czechoslovak communist committed leftist Artur London, a defendant in the Slánský trial
- Corbari (1970) – Italian war drama film based on real life events of Italian partisan Silvio Corbari
- Cromwell (1970) – British historical drama film based on the life of Oliver Cromwell, who rose to lead the Parliamentary forces during the later parts of the English Civil War and, as Lord Protector, ruled Great Britain and Ireland in the 1650s
- The Cross and the Switchblade (1970) – biographical crime drama film about David Wilkerson, a Christian evangelist and Nicky Cruz, a teen gang member whose life was transformed by Wilkerson's ministry
- The Diane Linkletter Story (1970) – biographical drama short film based on the 1969 suicide of TV personality Art Linkletter's daughter, Diane
- Dirtymouth (1970) – biographical drama film about the life and career of the controversial comedian, Lenny Bruce
- Emiliano Zapata (1970) – Mexican biographical drama film about Mexican revolutionary Emiliano Zapata
- The Garden of the Finzi-Continis (Italian: Il giardino dei Finzi Contini) (1970) – Italian historical war drama film based on Giorgio Bassani's 1962 semi-autobiographical novel of the same name, about the lives of an upper-class Jewish family in Ferrara during the Fascist era
- George M! (1970) – musical biographical comedy television film based on the life of George M. Cohan, the biggest Broadway star of his day who was known as "The Man Who Owned Broadway"
- The Great Inimitable Mr. Dickens (1970) – British biographical drama television film about the life of Charles Dickens
- The Honeymoon Killers (1970) – crime drama film inspired by the true story of Raymond Fernandez and Martha Beck, the notorious "lonely hearts killers" of the 1940s
- Julius Caesar (1970) – historical war drama film about Julius Caesar, based on the play of the same name by William Shakespeare
- Liberation: Breakthrough (Russian: Освобождение: Прорыв; German: Befreiung II. Teil. Der Durchbruch; Polish: Wyzwolenie II: Przełom) (1970) – Soviet-Polish-Yugoslav-East German historical war drama film depicting the Lower Dnieper Offensive of September 1943
- Liberation: The Fire Bulge (Russian: Освобождение: Огненная дуга; German: Befreiung I. Teil Der Feuerbogen; Polish: Wyzwolenie I: Ognisty łuk) (1970) – Soviet-Polish-Yugoslav-East German historical war drama film depicting the grandiose battle on the Kursk Bulge in the summer of 1943
- The Loves of Liszt (Hungarian: Szerelmi álmok – Liszt) (1970) – Soviet era Hungarian epic drama film based on the biography of the Hungarian composer and pianist Franz Liszt
- The McKenzie Break (1970) – British war drama film loosely reflecting real-life events at POW camp in Ontario, Canada; in particular, the interception of German attempts to communicate in code with the captured U-boat ace Otto Kretschmer, and the "trial" of Captain Hans-Joachim Rahmlow and his second-in-command, Bernhard Berndt from U-570, which was surrendered in September 1941, and recommissioned as HMS Graph
- Ned Kelly (1970) – British-Australian biographical bushranger film about 19th-century Australian bushranger Ned Kelly
- Patton (1970) – epic biographical war film about U.S. General George S. Patton during World War II
- Promise at Dawn (1970) – biographical drama film following author Romain Gary as he recalls his growing up with his Lithuanian-born mother
- Shangani Patrol (1970) – Rhodesian war drama film portraying the true story of a battalion of volunteer soldiers facing the might of King Lobengula's army in Rhodesia in 1893
- The Six Wives of Henry VIII (1970) – British historical drama miniseries about the Wives of Henry VIII
- Soldier Blue (1970) – war drama revisionist Western film inspired by events of the 1864 Sand Creek massacre in the Colorado Territory
- Song of Norway (1970) – biographical drama film depicting the early struggles of composer Edvard Grieg and his attempts to develop an authentic Norwegian national music
- Tchaikovsky (Russian: Чайковский) (1970) – Soviet biographical drama film about the famous Russian composer Pyotr Ilyich Tchaikovsky
- Tora! Tora! Tora! (Japanese: トラ・トラ・トラ！) (1970) – American-Japanese epic war film dramatizing the Japanese attack on Pearl Harbor in 1941
- Tropic of Cancer (1970) – biographical drama film depicting the adventures of expatriate American writer Henry Miller and his friends, as they pursue art, money, food, and sex in Paris
- Wang-geon, the Great (Korean: 태조 왕건) (1970) – South Korean historical film depicting the life of Wang-geon who ruled the Goryeo Dynasty
- Waterloo (Russian: Ватерлоо) (1970) – Soviet-Italian epic historical war film about the Battle of Waterloo
- Weddings of Mr. Vok (Czech: Svatby pana Voka) (1971) – Czechoslovak comedy film describing love adventures of the Bohemian nobleman Peter Vok of Rosenberg
- The Wild Child (French: L'Enfant sauvage) (1970) – French biographical drama film based on the true events regarding the child Victor of Aveyron

== 1971 ==
- 10 Rillington Place (1971) – British crime drama film dramatizing the case of British serial killer John Christie, who committed many of his crimes in the titular London terraced house, and the miscarriage of justice involving his neighbour Timothy Evans
- A Season in Hell (French: Une saison en enfer, Italian: Una stagione all'inferno) (1971) – French-Italian drama film depicting the life and death of the poet Arthur Rimbaud and his troubled relationship with the poet Paul Verlaine until the African adventure in Ethiopia
- The American West of John Ford (1971) – Western biographical television film about movie director John Ford's career
- Arutperunjothi (Tamil: அருட்பெருஞ்ஜோதி) (1971) – Indian Tamil-language biographical film about Ramalinga Swamigal
- Bolesław Śmiały (1971) – Polish historical film about Bolesław II the Generous
- Brian's Song (1971) – biographical sport drama film that recounts the life of Brian Piccolo (James Caan), a Chicago Bears football player stricken with terminal cancer, focusing on his friendship with teammate Gale Sayers
- Dauria (Russian: Даурия) (1971) – Soviet historical drama film about traditional life of Cossacks in the Siberian province of Dauria at the time of the communist revolution
- The Devils (1971) – American-British historical drama horror film depicting a dramatized historical account of the fall of Urbain Grandier, a 17th-century Roman Catholic priest accused of witchcraft after the possessions in Loudun, France, the plot also focuses on Sister Jeanne des Anges, a sexually repressed nun who incites the accusations
- Dirty Harry (1971) – neo-noir action thriller film based on the real-life case of the Zodiac Killer
- Doc (1971) – Western drama film which tells the story of the Gunfight at the O.K. Corral and of one of its protagonists, Doc Holliday
- Elizabeth R (1971) – biographical drama miniseries about the life and reign of Elizabeth I
- Evel Knievel (1971) – biographical drama film about motorcycle daredevil Evel Knievel
- The French Connection (1971) – neo-noir action thriller film telling the story of fictional NYPD detectives Jimmy "Popeye" Doyle and Buddy "Cloudy" Russo, whose real-life counterparts were narcotics detectives Eddie Egan and Sonny Grosso, in pursuit of wealthy French heroin smuggler Alain Charnier
- Goya, a Story of Solitude (Spanish: Goya, historia de una soledad) (1971) – Spanish historical drama film portraying the life of the Spanish artist Francisco Goya
- Joe Hill (1971) – American-Swedish biographical drama film about the Swedish-American labor activist and songwriter Joe Hill
- The Life of Leonardo da Vinci (Italian: La Vita di Leonardo Da Vinci) (1971) – Italian biographical miniseries dramatizing the life of the Italian Renaissance genius Leonardo da Vinci
- Macbeth (1971) – historical drama film loosely based on the historical king Macbeth of Scotland, adapted from the play by William Shakespeare
- Man in the Wilderness (1971) – revisionist Western drama film loosely based on the life of Hugh Glass
- Mary, Queen of Scots (1971) – American-British historical drama film based on the life of Mary Stuart, Queen of Scotland
- Mathias Kneissl (1971) – West German drama film inspired by the real life events of Mathias Kneißl, a marginal man, son of poor farmers from Bavaria who stole from the rich and gave to the poor
- Michael the Brave (Romanian: Mihai Viteazul) (1971) – Romanian historical epic film depicting a representation of the life of Wallachia's ruler Michael the Brave, and his will to unite the three Romanian principalities (Wallachia, Moldavia and Transylvania) into one country
- The Music Lovers (1971) – British biographical drama film focusing on the life and career of 19th-century Russian composer Pyotr Ilyich Tchaikovsky
- Nicholas and Alexandra (1971) – British epic historical drama film telling the story of the last ruling Russian monarch, Tsar Nicholas II of Russia, and his wife, Tsarina Alexandra, from 1904 until their deaths in 1918
- One Day Before the Rainy Season (Hindi: आषाढ़ का एक दिन) (1971) – Indian Hindi-language biographical drama film centering on a love triangle between Sanskrit poet Kalidas, Mallika and Priyangumanjari
- The Other Side of Madness (1971) – crime drama film based on the crimes of the Manson Family, made while the trial was still ongoing
- Rain for a Dusty Summer (1971) – war drama film depicting the life and death of Mexican priest Miguel Pro during the Cristero War
- The Red Baron (1971) – war drama film telling the story of Manfred von Richthofen, the German air ace during World War I and his struggle with the enemy aces and some jealous German officers
- Sacco & Vanzetti (Italian: Sacco e Vanzetti, French: Sacco et Vanzetti) (1971) – Italian-French biographical drama film based on the events surrounding the trial and execution of Nicola Sacco and Bartolomeo Vanzetti, two anarchists of Italian origin, who were sentenced to death for murdering a guard and a paymaster during the 15 April 1920, armed robbery of the Slater and Morrill Shoe Company in Braintree, Massachusetts
- Socrates (1971) – Spanish-Italian-French historical biographical television film telling the personal and historical events of the last period of the life of Socrates, the famous Athenian philosopher
- The Third Part of the Night (Polish: Trzecia część nocy) (1971) – Polish horror film inspired by the experiences of Żuławski's father Mirosław who worked at the Weigel Institute in Nazi-occupied Lviv
- To Die of Love (French: Mourir d'aimer; Italian: Morire d'amore) (1971) – French-Italian drama film based on the true story of Gabrielle Russier
- The Todd Killings (1971) – psychological thriller film based on the true crimes of serial killer Charles Schmid in the 1960s
- Who Says I Can't Ride a Rainbow! (1971) – family drama film based on the true story of Barney Morowitz, who "struggled to maintain a pony stable in Greenwich Village"
- The Zodiac Killer (1971) – slasher film based on the murders committed by the Zodiac Killer in the San Francisco area

== 1972 ==
- 1776 (1972) – historical musical drama film depicting a fictionalized account of the events leading up to the signing of the Declaration of Independence
- Aguirre, the Wrath of God (German: Aguirre, der Zorn Gottes) (1972) – West German-Mexican-Peruvian epic historical drama film about Spanish soldier Lope de Aguirre, who led a group of conquistadores down the Amazon River in South America in search of the legendary city of gold, El Dorado
- And Give My Love to the Swallows (Czech: ...a pozdravuji vlaštovky) (1972) – Czechoslovak biographical war film based on the prison diary from Czech resistance fighter Marie Kudeříková
- Antony and Cleopatra (1972) – historical drama film following the relationship between Cleopatra and Mark Antony from the time of the Sicilian revolt to Cleopatra's suicide during the War of Actium; based on the play of the same name by William Shakespeare
- The Assassination of Trotsky (1972) – British historical drama film about the assassination of Leon Trotsky
- Bloody Friday (German: Blutiger Freitag) (1972) – West German-Italian crime film based on an actual 1971 hostage incident that occurred at a German bank
- Boxcar Bertha (1972) – romantic crime drama film about a union leader and a young woman during the Great Depression who became criminals to exact revenge on the management of a railroad; the character Bertha Thompson was an amalgam of at least three women that Reitman knew, but was mostly modeled on a woman named Retta Toble
- Brother Sun, Sister Moon (Italian: Fratello Sole, Sorella Luna) (1972) – Italian historical drama film examining the life of Saint Francis of Assisi
- Burke & Hare (1972) – horror film based on the true life story of the Burke and Hare murders
- The Castle of Purity (Spanish: El castillo de la pureza) (1972) – Mexican drama film based in a real criminal case that took place in Mexico City in 1959
- Ciao! Manhattan (1972) – romantic biographical drama film depicting a semi-biographical tale of 1960s counterculture icon Edie Sedgwick
- The Darwin Adventure (1972) – British biographical drama film about Victorian naturalist Charles Darwin's 5-year voyage around the world aboard HMS Beagle, whereby he returned with the theory of evolution
- Dirty Little Billy (1972) – revisionist Western drama film portraying the gritty early years of one of the most famous Wild West outlaws in history, Billy the Kid
- Eight Deadly Shots (Finnish: Kahdeksan surmanluotia) (1972) – Finnish drama film inspired by a 7 March 1969 mass shooting incident in Pihtipudas, Finland, in which a smallholder shot and killed four armed policemen who had come to calm him down after he drove his family out of the house in a drunken rage
- Farewell to St. Petersburg (Russian: Прощание с Петербургом) (1972) – Soviet biographical drama film about the Austrian composer Johann Strauss's stay in Russia, his concerts in Pavlovsk in the summer of 1857, and his love towards the Russian aristocrat Olga Smirnitskiy, to whom he dedicated several works
- Grandmaster (Russian: Гроссмейстер) (1972) – Soviet sport drama film about the emotional chess player Sergey Khlebnikov, who does not play for the sake of victory and suddenly he becomes the winner of the international match of applicants
- The Great Man's Whiskers (1972) – drama television film inspired by the true story of Grace Bedell, who wrote to Abraham Lincoln just before his election to the presidency in 1860
- The Great Northfield, Minnesota Raid (1972) – Western drama film about the James-Younger Gang, recreating the gang's most infamous escapade, the 7 September 1876, robbery of "the biggest bank west of the Mississippi", in Northfield, Minnesota
- The Great Waltz (1972) – biographical musical film following 40 years in the life of composer Johann Strauss (the Younger, known as the "Waltz King") and his family
- Henry VIII and His Six Wives (1972) – British historical drama miniseries about Henry VIII and his six wives; Catherine of Aragon, Anne Boleyn, Jane Seymour, Anne of Cleves, Catherine Howard and Catherine Parr
- Lady Caroline Lamb (1972) – British epic romantic drama film based on the life of Lady Caroline Lamb, novelist, sometime lover of Lord Byron and wife of politician William Lamb, 2nd Viscount Melbourne
- Lady Sings the Blues (1972) – biographical drama film about jazz singer Billie Holiday
- The Life and Times of Judge Roy Bean (1972) – Western comedy film loosely based on the life and times of Judge Roy Bean
- Living Free (1972) – British adventure drama film depiciting the life of Elsa the lioness' cubs after the death of Elsa
- The Longest Night (1972) – drama television film based on the 1968 Barbara Mackle kidnapping by Gary Steven Krist
- Ludwig: Requiem for a Virgin King (German: Ludwig – Requiem für einen jungfräulichen König) (1972) – West German historical drama film depiciting the story of the legendary King Ludwig II of Bavaria, his opera interest and friendship with theatre personalities such as Richard Wagner and Joseph Kainz, and at the same time a reflection of the German 1800s
- The Mattei Affair (Italian: Il Caso Mattei) (1972) – Italian mystery drama film depiciting the life and mysterious death of Enrico Mattei, an Italian businessman who in the aftermath of World War II managed to avoid the sale of the nascent Italian oil and hydrocarbon industry to US companies and developed them in the Eni, a state-owned oil company which rivaled the "Seven Sisters" for oil and gas deals in Northern African and Middle Eastern countries
- Pancho Villa (1972) – Italian-Spanish spaghetti Western comedy film about Mexican revolutionary Pancho Villa
- Pope Joan (1972) – British biographical drama film based on the story of Pope Joan
- Savage Messiah (1972) – British biographical drama film based on the life of French sculptor Henri Gaudier-Brzeska
- Taming of the Fire (Russian: Укрощение огня) (1972) – Soviet biographical drama film about the Soviet space program and missile industry, and its founder Sergei Korolev, from the 1920s to the first man in space in 1961
- Theodor Hierneis oder Wie man ehem. Hofkoch wird (1972) – West German historical drama film about Theodor Hierneis, the chef at the court of Ludwig II of Bavaria
- Trotz alledem! (1972) – East German biographical war drama film about the life of German socialist Karl Liebknecht
- The Valachi Papers (1972) – neo noir crime drama film telling the story of Joseph Valachi, a Mafia informant in the early 1960s who was the first ever mafioso to acknowledge the organization's existence
- Walter Defends Sarajevo (Serbo-Croatian: Валтер брани Сарајево) (1972) – Yugoslav partisan film loosely based around Vladimir Perić, whose nom de guerre was 'Valter'
- The Weekend Nun (1972) – drama television film based on the true story of Joyce Duco, a nun who became a probation officer
- Young Winston (1972) – British epic adventure drama film covering the early years of British Prime Minister Winston Churchill

== 1973 ==
- The 14 (1973) – British drama film concerning the fate of fourteen children in West London who are orphaned after the death of their single mother
- Achanak (Hindi: अचानक) (1973) – Indian Hindi-language crime drama film inspired by the real-life sensational 1958 murder case KM Nanavati v State of Maharashtra
- Adolf Hitler: My Part in His Downfall (1973) – British comedy film based on the first volume of Spike Milligan's autobiography
- The Age of the Medici (Italian: L'età di Cosimo de Medici) (1973) – Italian biographical drama miniseries about the Renaissance in Florence
- Badlands (1973) – neo-noir crime drama film loosely based on the real-life murder spree of Charles Starkweather and his girlfriend, Caril Ann Fugate, in 1958
- Battle of Sutjeska (Serbo-Croatian: Sutjeska) (1973) – Yugoslav war film telling the story of the famous Battle of Sutjeska, the greatest engagement of the Yugoslav Partisan War
- The Blockhouse (1973) – war drama film based on a real events whereby after an explosive Allied air raid on a Nazi prison camp in 1944, six escaped prisoners take shelter in an underground blockhouse, whose exits are then blocked by falling masonry, leaving all six men trapped inside
- Copernicus (Polish: Kopernik) (1973) – Polish historical drama film about the life of Nicolaus Copernicus
- Country Blue (1973) – film loosely based off several bank robberies which occurred at a Farmers and Merchants Bank.
- Coup d'État (Japanese: 戒厳令) (1973) – Japanese drama film based on the life of nationalist intellectual Ikki Kita and an account of the attempted overthrow of the Japanese government by a group of army officers on 26 February 1936
- The Day of the Jackal (1973) – political thriller film about a professional assassin known only as the "Jackal" who is hired to assassinate French president Charles de Gaulle; the story surrounding the Jackal is fictitious, although the historical background is true
- The Death of Adolf Hitler (1973) – British biographical television film detailing the last 10 days of Hitler's life as World War II comes to an end and Allied troops close in on the Führerbunker
- Dillinger (1973) – biographical gangster film about the life and criminal exploits of notorious bank robber John Dillinger
- The Dominici Affair (French: L'affaire Dominici; Italian: L'affare Dominici) – French-Italian crime drama film based on the Dominici affair of 1952
- The Exorcist (1973) – supernatural horror film detailing the demonic possession of eleven-year-old Regan MacNeil, the daughter of a famous actress, and the two priests who attempt to exorcise the demon, purportedly based on a true story
- Explosion (Romania: Explozia) (1973) – Romanian action drama film about a real event that took place in 1970, the fire of the ship Vrachos (renamed in the film as Poseidon) on which 3,700 of 4–000 tons of ammonium nitrate were loaded and which threatened to destroy the city of Galați
- George Who? (French: George qui?) (1973) – French biographical comedy film depicting the life of the French author George Sand
- Giordano Bruno (1973) – Italian biographical drama film chronicling the last years of life of the philosopher Giordano Bruno (1548–1600), from the year 1592, when his ideas drew the attention of guardians of Roman Catholic doctrines, to his execution in 1600
- Hitler: The Last Ten Days (1973) – British-Italian biographical drama film depicting the days leading up to Adolf Hitler's suicide
- Hubal (1973) – Polish epic war film about Henryk Dobrzański as leader of the partisan unit known as the Detached Unit of the Polish Army which operated in 1939 and early 1940 near Kielce
- Jesus Christ Superstar (1973) – musical drama film loosely based on the Gospels' accounts of the Passion
- The Last American Hero (1973) – sport drama film based on the true story of NASCAR driver Junior Johnson
- Little 8th Route Army (Mandarin: 小八路) (1973) – Chinese animated war film based on the National Revolutionary Army's 8th Route Army division, when it was under the control of Chinese Communist Party instead of the opposing Kuomintang
- Little Laura and Big John (1973) – biographical crime drama film about the exploits of the Ashley gang in the Florida everglades in the 1910s and 1920s
- Lost in the Bush (1973) – Australian thriller drama film based on the true story of three siblings who got lost in the Victorian bush for several days in 1864
- Lucky Luciano (1973) – Italian-French-American crime drama film about the Sicilian-American gangster Charles "Lucky" Luciano
- Ludwig (German: Ludwig II.) (1973) – West German-Italian-French epic biographical drama film about Ludwig II, who ruled Bavaria from 1864 to 1886
- Massacre in Rome (Italian: Rappresaglia) (1973) – Italian war drama film about the Ardeatine massacre which occurred at the Ardeatine caves in Rome, 24 March 1944, committed by the Germans as a reprisal for a partisan attack against the SS Police Regiment Bozen
- Maurie (1973) – biographical sport drama film covering the lives and relationship of two NBA Hall of fame basketball players, the forward Jack Twyman, and his teammate the forward Maurice Stokes
- Only "Old Men" Are Going Into Battle (Russian: В бой идут одни «старики») (1973) – Soviet war drama film about World War II fighter pilots depicting the Battle of the Dnieper
- Outrage (1973) – crime drama television film telling the story of a suburban neighborhood and family that is repeatedly terrorized by a group of privileged young men from neighboring families, based on a true incident
- Papillon (1973) – American-French epic historical drama film based on the 1969 autobiography by the French convict Henri Charrière
- Pat Garrett and Billy the Kid (1973) – revisionist Western drama film about an aging Pat Garrett who was hired as a lawman by a group of wealthy New Mexico cattle barons to bring down his old friend Billy the Kid
- Pueblo (1973) – war drama television film depicting the story of the capture and imprisonment of the crew of USS Pueblo, a US Navy vessel captured while spying off the coast of North Korea, in 1968
- Reed: Insurgent Mexico (Spanish: Reed, México insurgente) (1973) – Mexican drama film based on John Reed's book Insurgent Mexico, a collection of Reed's accounts of the Mexican Revolution
- Serpico (1973) – biographical crime drama film detailing Frank Serpico's struggle with corruption within the New York City Police Department during his eleven years of service, and his work as a whistleblower that led to the investigation by the Knapp Commission
- Sunshine (1973) – biographical drama television film about a young wife and mother who dies of cancer at age 20, based on the life of Jacquelyn M. "Lyn" Helton
- The Tenderness of Wolves (German: Die Zärtlichkeit der Wölfe) (1973) – West German crime drama film based on the crimes of German serial killer and cannibal Fritz Haarmann
- Walking Tall (1973) – neo-noir biographical vigilante film based on the life of Buford Pusser, a professional wrestler-turned-lawman in McNairy County, Tennessee

== 1974 ==
- The Abdication (1974) – British historical drama film depicting a fictionalized version of the rumored love affair between Christina, Queen of Sweden and Cardinal Decio Azzolino during the former's stay in Rome after abdicating her throne
- Alluri Seetarama Raju (Telugu: అల్లూరి సీతారామ రాజు) (1974) – Indian Telugu-language biographical action film depicting the life of Alluri Sitarama Raju, an Indian revolutionary, who is known for his role in the Rampa Rebellion of 1922
- Black Thursday (French: Les Guichets du Louvre) (1974) – French historical drama film portraying the Vel' d'Hiv Roundup in 1942, when French police arrested over 13,000 Jewish inhabitants of Paris and held them under inhumane conditions for deportation to Auschwitz, where virtually all were murdered
- Clarence Darrow (1974) – biographical drama television film about the celebrated defense lawyer Clarence Darrow
- Conrack (1974) – drama film telling the true story of young teacher Pat Conroy who was, in 1969, assigned to teach on isolated Yamacraw Island (Daufuskie Island) off the coast of South Carolina which was populated mostly by poor black families
- Deranged (1974) – psychological horror film loosely based on the crimes of Ed Gein
- The Dove (1974) – biographical drama film based on the real-life experiences of Robin Lee Graham, a young man who spent five years sailing around the world as a single-handed sailor, starting when he was 16 years old
- The Education of Sonny Carson (1974) – blaxploitation drama film based on the best-selling autobiography of Sonny Carson
- Edvard Munch (1974) – Norwegian-Swedish biographical drama film about the Norwegian Expressionist painter Edvard Munch
- The Enigma of Kaspar Hauser (German: Jeder für sich und Gott gegen alle) (1974) – West German drama film following the real story of foundling Kaspar Hauser
- The Execution of Private Slovik (1974) – biographical drama television film telling the story of Private Eddie Slovik, the only American military serviceman executed for desertion (during World War II) since the American Civil War
- F. Scott Fitzgerald and 'The Last of the Belles' (1974) – biographical drama television film depicting a semi-fictional account of how writer F. Scott Fitzgerald met his wife while he was in the army and stationed in Alabama in 1919
- The Gathering Storm (1974) – American-British biographical drama television film about Winston Churchill's life in the years just prior to, and at the start of, World War II, from 1936 to 1940
- The Great McGonagall (1974) – British comedy film about the Scottish poet William McGonagall
- Guns of War (Serbo-Croatian: Ужичка република) (1974) – Yugoslav war film telling the story of the rise and fall of the Republic of Užice, a short-lived territory liberated by Yugoslav partisans which existed for several months in 1941
- The Holy Office (Spanish: El santo oficio) (1974) – Mexican drama film depicting the shocking story of the Spanish Inquisition hunting Jews, believed to be the cause of a plague spreading in 16th century colonial Mexico
- Houston, We've Got a Problem (1974) – drama television film about the Apollo 13 spaceflight
- It's Good to Be Alive (1974) – sport drama television film about baseball player Roy Campanella of the Brooklyn Dodgers
- Italy: Year One (Italian: Anno uno) (1974) – Italian biographical film telling the story of the political reconstruction of post-fascist Italy between 1944 and 1954, seen through the career of Alcide De Gasperi
- Jennie: Lady Randolph Churchill (1974) – British biographical drama miniseries about Jennie Jerome, who became Lady Randolph Churchill
- Karl May (1974) – West German biographical drama film about Karl May
- Lacombe, Lucien (1974) – French war drama film about a French teenage boy during the German occupation of France in World War II
- Larry (1974) – drama television film telling the true story about a man wrongly confined the California State Mental Hospital at Camarillo for 26 years, who is discovered to have average intelligence and released, and with the help of a kind social worker's guidance, has to learn to cope with the real world
- Last Days of Mussolini (Italian: Mussolini: Ultimo atto) (1974) – Italian historical drama film depicting the days leading up to the death of Benito Mussolini, the Italian dictator, when he attempted to flee Milan in April 1945 at the end of World War II in Europe
- Lenny (1974) – biographical drama film about the comedian Lenny Bruce
- Luther (1974) – biographical drama film presenting the life of Martin Luther
- Mahler (1974) – British biographical drama film based on the life of Austro-Bohemian composer Gustav Mahler
- The Man from Independence (1974) – biographical drama television film telling the story of Harry S. Truman as he begins his political career in 1929
- Man on a Swing (1974) – thriller film loosely drawn from a true-life murder investigation and based on the non-fiction book The Girl on the Volkswagen Floor (1971) by journalist William Arthur Clark
- Massacre Mafia Style (1974) – crime thriller film based on true stories Duke Mitchell was told over the years
- Melvin Purvis: G-Man (1974) – biographical crime television film loosely based on Machine Gun Kelly's actual 1933 kidnapping of an Oklahoma petroleum executive
- Miracles Still Happen (Italian: I miracoli accadono ancora) (1974) – Italian adventure drama film depicting the story of Juliane Koepcke, the sole survivor of 92 passengers and crew, in 24 December 1971 crash of LANSA Flight 508 in the Peruvian rainforest
- The Missiles of October (1974) – biographical drama television film about the Cuban Missile Crisis in October 1962
- The Murri Affair (Italian: Fatti di gente perbene; French: La grande bourgeoise) (1974) – Italian-French historical drama film based on real events of a notorious 1902 murder trial
- Napoleon and Love (1974) – British biographical drama miniseries depicting Napoleon's relationships with the women who featured in his life as a backdrop to his rise and fall
- The Nest (Polish: Gniazdo) (1974) – Polish historical drama film about Mieszko I, the founder of the first independent Polish state, circa 960 AD
- Orders (French: Les Ordres) (1974) – Canadian French-language historical drama film about the incarceration of innocent civilians during the 1970 October Crisis and the War Measures Act enacted by the Canadian government of Pierre Trudeau
- Piaf (1974) – French biographical drama film based on the early career of the singer Edith Piaf
- Quebracho (1974) – Argentine drama film telling the story of "La Forestal," an English company extracting Quebracho trees between 1900 and 1963 in the northern province of Santa Fe
- Salvo D'Acquisto (1974) – Italian biographical drama film based on real life events of the Carabinieri member Salvo D'Acquisto, who during the Nazi occupation of Rome saved 22 civilians from being executed by German soldiers
- Stavisky (1974) – French biographical drama film based on the life of the financier and embezzler Alexandre Stavisky and the circumstances leading to his mysterious death in 1934
- The Story of Jacob and Joseph (1974) – Christian drama film based on the Biblical Book of Genesis
- The Sugarland Express (1974) – crime drama film about a husband and wife trying to outrun the law, based on a real-life incident
- The Super Cops (1974) – action adventure film telling the true story of two New York City cops, Greenberg & Hantz, who fought the system, became detectives and were known on the streets as "Batman & Robin"
- The Texas Chain Saw Massacre (1974) – horror film inspired by the crimes of murderer Ed Gein
- Trapped Beneath the Sea (1974) – action drama television film loosely based on the 1973 Johnson Sea Link accident
- Violins at the Ball (French: Les Violons du bal) (1974) – French drama film telling the story of Michel Drach's childhood during World War II and his family's escape from occupying Nazis
- Where the Red Fern Grows (1974) – family drama film based loosely on Wilson Rawls' own childhood in the Ozarks
- Young Lucrezia (Italian: Lucrezia giovane) (1974) – Italian historical drama film about the life of Lucrezia Borgia

== 1975 ==
- A Bag of Marbles (French: Un sac de billes) (1975) – French biographical drama film based on the 1973 autobiographical novel Un sac de billes by Joseph Joffo
- A Woman Called Sada Abe (Japanese: 実録阿部定) (1975) – Japanese pink biographical drama film based on the true story of Sada Abe, a woman who strangled her lover during a love-making session, then severed his penis, which she carried with her until her arrest
- All Creatures Great and Small (1975) – biographical drama film based on the first two James Herriot's novels, inspired by his actual experiences as a veterinary surgeon
- Aloïse (1975) – French biographical drama film about the life of Aloïse Corbaz
- Ben Hall (1975) – Australian biographical drama miniseries based on the bush ranger Ben Hall
- Capone (1975) – biographical crime film about the infamous Al Capone
- Champion of Death (Japanese: けんか空手 極真拳) (1975) – Japanese martial arts film based on Masutatsu Oyama's life
- The Day That Shook the World (Serbo-Croatian: Sarajevski atentat) (1975) – Czechoslovak-Yugoslav-West German historical drama film about the assassination of Archduke Franz Ferdinand and his wife Sophie in Sarajevo in 1914 and the immediate aftermath that led to the outbreak of World War I
- The Deadly Tower (1975) – action drama thriller television film based on the true story of Charles Joseph Whitman, an engineering student and former Marine who murdered his own wife and mother and then killed 14 more people and wounded 31 others in a shooting rampage at the University of Texas at Austin on the afternoon of 1 August 1966
- Dersu Uzala (Russian: Дерсу Узала; Japanese: デルス·ウザーラ) (1975) – Soviet-Japanese adventure drama film based on the 1923 memoir Dersu Uzala (which was named after the native trapper) by Russian explorer Vladimir Arsenyev, about his exploration of the Sikhote-Alin region of the Russian Far East over the course of multiple expeditions in the early 20th century
- Desertion (Norwegian: Faneflukt) (1975) – Norwegian romantic drama film depicting a different perspective on the German occupation of Norway in World War Two
- Dog Day Afternoon (1975) – biographical crime drama film chronicling the 1972 robbery and hostage situation led by John Wojtowicz and Salvatore Naturile at a Chase Manhattan branch in Brooklyn
- Doktor Mladen (1975) – Yugoslav biographical war drama film about the life of Mladen Stojanović during the Second World War
- Edward the Seventh (1975) – British historical drama miniseries based on the biography of King Edward VII
- The Empress Dowager (Cantonese: 傾國傾城) (1975) – Hong Kong historical drama film about Empress Dowager Cixi
- F. Scott Fitzgerald in Hollywood (1975) – biographical romantic drama television film about F. Scott Fitzgerald's screenwriting career
- Fear on Trial (1975) – drama television film about the blacklisting of 1950s broadcast personality John Henry Faulk
- Flic Story (1975) – French crime thriller film portraying Roger Borniche's nine-year pursuit of French gangster and murderer Emile Buisson, who was executed on 28 February 1956
- Funny Lady (1975) – biographical musical comedy drama film depicting a highly fictionalized account of the later life and career of comedienne Fanny Brice and her marriage to songwriter and impresario Billy Rose
- Galileo (1975) – biographical drama film about the 16th- and 17th-century scientist Galileo Galilei, whose astronomical observations with the newly invented telescope led to a profound conflict with the Roman Catholic Church
- Give 'em Hell, Harry! (1975) – biographical comedy drama film about former President of the United States Harry S. Truman
- Graveyard of Honor (Japanese: 仁義の墓場) (1975) – Japanese yakuza film based on the life of real-life yakuza member Rikio Ishikawa
- The Happy Hooker (1975) – biographical comedy film about the life of Xaviera Hollander
- The Hiding Place (1975) – historical biographical drama film recounting Corrie ten Boom's and her family's experiences before and during their imprisonment in a Nazi concentration camp during the Holocaust during World War II
- The Hindenburg (1975) – historical adventure disaster film based on the 1937 Hindenburg disaster
- Karate Bearfighter (Japanese: けんか空手 極真無頼拳) (1975) – Japanese martial arts film based on the true life story of a Korean fighter named Choi Bae-dal
- Katherine (1975) – drama television film loosely based on Diana Oughton of the Weather Underground, who died in the 1970 Greenwich Village townhouse explosion when a bomb she was building accidentally exploded
- The Legend of Lizzie Borden (1975) – historical mystery television film about Lizzie Borden, an American woman who was accused of murdering her father and stepmother in 1892
- The Legend of Valentino (1975) – biographical drama television film dealing with real life events about the actor and sex symbol of the 1920s Rudolph Valentino
- Lepke (1975) – biographical gangster film about the Jewish-American gangster Louis "Lepke" Buchalter
- Lisztomania (1975) – surreal biographical musical film about the 19th-century composer Franz Liszt
- Little Ralph (Spanish: La Raulito) (1975) – Argentine biographical drama film telling the story of a real life fan of Boca Juniors football club, María Esther Duffau, who as a teenage girl adopted the identity of a man to survive on the streets of Buenos Aires
- The Messiah (Italian: Il messia) (1975) – Italian-French Christian drama film about the story of the life of Jesus Christ
- Mirror (Russian: Зеркало) (1975) – Soviet biographical drama film which is loosely autobiographical of Andrei Tarkovsky, unconventionally structured, and incorporates poems composed and read by the director's father, Arseny Tarkovsky
- Murph the Surf (1975) – biographical crime comedy film based on a jewel burglary involving the surfer Jack Roland Murphy, who had the nickname "Murph the Surf"
- The Naked Civil Servant (1975) – biographical comedy drama television film about British gay icon Quentin Crisp
- The Night That Panicked America (1975) – drama television film dramatizing events surrounding Orson Welles' famous – and infamous – War of the Worlds radio broadcast of 30 October 1938, which had led some Americans to believe that an invasion by Martians was occurring in the area near Grover's Mill in West Windsor, New Jersey
- Operation Daybreak (1975) – historical war drama film based on the true story of Operation Anthropoid, the assassination of SS general Reinhard Heydrich in Prague
- The Other Side of the Mountain (1975) – romantic drama film based on the true story of ski racing champion Jill Kinmont
- Recommendation for Mercy (1975) – Canadian drama film fictionalizing the murder trial of Steven Truscott
- The Silence (1975) – drama television film about James Pelosi, a West Point cadet who was charged in 1971 with cheating on an exam
- Stephen the Great - Vaslui 1475 (Romanian: Ștefan cel Mare – Vaslui 1475) (1975) – Romanian biographical drama film depicting the Battle of Vaslui of 1475
- The Story of Adele H. (French: L'Histoire d'Adèle H.) (1975) – French historical drama film about Adèle Hugo, the daughter of writer Victor Hugo, whose obsessive unrequited love for a military officer leads to her downfall
- Streik! (1975) – Norwegian biographical drama film loosely based on Tor Obrestad'd novel Sauda! Strike!, which is about the Sauda strike in 1970
- The UFO Incident (1975) – biographical drama television film based on the alleged 1961 alien abduction of Barney and Betty Hill
- Walking Tall Part 2 (1975) – crime action film depicting how Sheriff Buford Pusser continues his one-man war against moonshiners and a ruthless crime syndicate after the murder of his wife in late 1960s Tennessee
- Who Is the Black Dahlia? (1975) – crime drama television film about the true crime unsolved murder of 22-year-old Elizabeth Short
- Winstanley (1975) – British biographical drama film about social reformer and writer Gerrard Winstanley

== 1976 ==
- 21 Hours at Munich (1976) – historical sport drama television film dealing with real events concerning the Munich massacre during the 1972 Summer Olympics
- The Adams Chronicles (1976) – historical miniseries chronicling the story of the Adams political family over a 150-year span
- All the President's Men (1976) – biographical political thriller drama film about the Watergate scandal that brought down the presidency of Richard Nixon
- Amelia Earhart (1976) – biographical drama television film covering Amelia Earhart's entire life from her childhood on a Kansas farm, her nursing during World War I, an early boyfriend, employment at a Boston children's orphanage, her interest and exploits in aviation, her marriage to Putnam, and her famous disappearance in 1937
- Babatu (1976) – Nigerien biographical war film based on the chronicles of the 19th century slave war of Babatou, who attacked and conquered the Songhay in Gurunsiland
- Barefoot Gen (Japanese: はだしのゲン) (1976) – Japanese war drama film telling the story of the six-year-old boy Gen Nakaoka, living in Hiroshima around the time of the US atomic bombing of the city
- The Belle of Amherst (1976) – biographical drama television film based on the life of poet Emily Dickinson from 1830 to 1886, and set in her Amherst, Massachusetts, home
- Born for Hell (1976) – West German-Canadian-French-Italian horror film loosely based on the crimes of serial killer Richard Speck, who murdered eight nursing students in Chicago, Illinois in 1966
- Bound for Glory (1976) – biographical drama film about depression-era folk singer and social advocate Woody Guthrie
- The Boy in the Plastic Bubble (1976) – biographical romantic drama television film inspired by the lives of David Vetter and Ted DeVita, who lacked effective immune systems
- Bruce Lee and I (Cantonese: 李小龍與我) (1976) – Hong Kong biographical drama film based on Bruce Lee's last days leading up to his death in Pei's apartment at Hong Kong on 20 July 1973
- Bruce Lee: The Man, The Myth (Cantonese: 李小龍傳奇) (1976) – Hong Kong biographical martial arts film chronicling Bruce Lee's life beginning with Lee leaving China to go to the university in Seattle
- Buffalo Bill and the Indians, or Sitting Bull's History Lesson (1976) – revisionist Western film examining the contradictions of Buffalo Bill Cody's life and his work with Native Americans
- Caddie (1976) – Australian romantic drama film based on Caddie, the Story of a Barmaid, a partly fictitious autobiography of Catherine Beatrice "Caddie" Edmonds
- Canoa: A Shameful Memory (Spanish: Canoa: memoria de un hecho vergonzoso) (1976) – Mexican adventure drama film based upon the San Miguel Canoa Massacre
- Dickens of London (1976) – British biographical drama miniseries based on the life of English novelist Charles Dickens
- The Disappearance of Aimee (1976) – biographical drama television film based on the mysterious disappearance of Aimee Semple McPherson in 1926 and the court case that followed her safe return after she was missing for four weeks
- The Dragon Lives (Cantonese: 詠春大兄) (1976) – Hong Kong martial arts film depicting a fictional account of Bruce Lee's life
- Eight Hundred Heroes (Mandarin: 八百壮士) (1976) – Taiwanese historical war drama film about the Defense of Sihang Warehouse in 1937 Shanghai, China
- Eleanor and Franklin (1976) – biographical romantic drama miniseries telling the story of Franklin and Eleanor Roosevelt, from early youth to his election as President of the United States, as told from Eleanor's point of view
- Eliza Fraser (1976) – Australian bawdy adventure drama film about the life of Eliza Fraser
- Everyone Dies Alone (German: Jeder stirbt für sich allein) (1976) – West German drama film based on the story of two ordinary Germans, Otto and Elise Hampel, who committed acts of civil disobedience against the Third Reich, were caught and sentenced to death
- Execute... Baby Ama? (Filipino: Bitayin si... Baby Ama?) (1976) – Filipino action crime film depicting the life of executed murderer and gang leader, Marciál "Baby" Ama
- Fellini's Casanova (Italian: Il Casanova di Federico Fellini) (1976) – Italian historical romance film about 18th-century Venetian adventurer and writer Giacomo Casanova
- Gable and Lombard (1976) – biographical romantic drama film based on the romance and consequent marriage of screen stars Clark Gable and Carole Lombard
- Ghashiram Kotwal (Marathi: घाशीराम कोतवाल) (1976) – Indian Marathi-language biographical historical film based on the life of Nana Phadnavis (1741–1800), one of the prominent ministers in the court of the Peshwa of Pune and Ghashiram Kotwal, the police chief of the city
- Goodbye, Norma Jean (1976) – biographical drama film based on the life of Marilyn Monroe
- The Great Houdini (1976) – biographical drama television film which is a fictionalized account of the life of the Hungarian-American escape artist and entertainer Harry Houdini
- Guardian of the Wilderness (1976) – drama film about the true story of Galen Clark, an explorer who successfully campaigned to have the Yosemite area set aside from commercial development, the original forerunner of the American national parks system
- Hawmps! (1976) – Western slapstick film about a United States Cavalry experiment to introduce camels into the service in the western United States, specifically Texas
- Helter Skelter (1976) – crime thriller miniseries based on the murders committed by the Manson Family
- I, Claudius (1976) – historical miniseries covering the history of the early Roman Empire, told from the perspective of the elderly Emperor Claudius who narrates the series
- In the Realm of the Senses (French: L'Empire des sens; Japanese: 愛のコリーダ) (1976) – French-Japanese romantic drama art film depicting a fictionalised and sexually explicit treatment of a 1936 murder committed by Sada Abe
- The Incredible Sarah (1976) – British historical drama film presenting a dramatization of the acting career of Sarah Bernhardt
- Jack the Ripper (German: Der Dirnenmörder von London) (1976) – West German-Swiss thriller film about Jack the Ripper
- James Dean (1976) – biographical drama television film about actor James Dean
- Jarosław Dąbrowski (1976) – Polish historical film about Jarosław Dąbrowski
- The Last Supper (Spanish: La última cena) (1976) – Cuban historical drama film telling the story of a pious Havana plantation owner in the 1790s, during Cuba's Spanish colonial period
- Leadbelly (1976) – biographical drama film chronicling the life of folk singer Huddie Ledbetter (better known as "Lead Belly")
- The Lindbergh Kidnapping Case (1976) – crime drama television film dramatizing the Lindbergh kidnapping
- The Loneliest Runner (1976) – sport drama television film based on the autobiography of John Curtis, one of America's top athletes, and the way the loneliness of his childhood affected the rest of his life
- Mad Dog Morgan (1976) – Australian bushranger based upon the life of Dan Morgan
- The Man Who Knew Love (Spanish: El hombre que supo amar) (1976) – Spanish biographical drama film about the life of Juan de Dios and his struggle against social, political and religious structures
- The Message (Arabic: الرسالة) (1976) – international co-production Islamic epic drama film chronicling the life and times of the Islamic prophet Muhammad through the perspective of his uncle Hamza ibn Abdul-Muttalib and adopted son Zayd ibn Harithah
- Midway (1976) – war drama film chronicling the Battle of Midway, a turning point in the Pacific Theater of Operations of World War II
- Please, Don't Bury Me Alive! (1976) – crime drama film about the dilemmas facing a young Chicano in the spring of 1972 amid the Chicano Movement
- Return to Earth (1976) – biographical drama television film dramatizing the emotional difficulties of Buzz Aldrin's life following his 1969 trip to the Moon on Apollo 11
- Salon Kitty (1976) – Italian-French-West German war drama film covering the real life events of the Salon Kitty operation, under which the Sicherheitsdienst took over an expensive brothel in Berlin, had the place wire tapped, and replaced all the prostitutes with trained spies, to gather information on various members of the Nazi Party and foreign dignitaries
- Shout at the Devil (1976) – British war adventure film loosely based on the sinking of the SMS Königsberg
- The Story of David (1976) – Christian drama television film depicting the biblical story of King David
- Summoned by Bells (1976) – British biographical television film about Sir John Betjeman, covering the period of his life up to the time he started his first job
- Survive! (Spanish: Supervivientes de los Andes) (1976) – Mexican thriller drama film based on the story of Uruguayan Air Force Flight 571
- Sybil (1976) – biographical drama miniseries about the treatment of Sybil Dorsett (a pseudonym for Shirley Ardell Mason) for dissociative identity disorder (then referred to as multiple personality disorder) by her psychoanalyst, Cornelia B. Wilbur
- Tanya (1976) – comedy drama film loosely based on the experiences of Patricia Hearst
- The Tenth Level (1976) – drama television film inspired by the Stanley Milgram obedience research
- The Town That Dreaded Sundown (1976) – thriller horror film loosely based on the 1946 Texarkana Moonlight murders, crimes attributed to an unidentified serial killer known as the Phantom Killer
- Voyage of the Damned (1976) – war drama film inspired by actual events concerning the fate of the ocean liner St. Louis carrying Jewish refugees from Germany to Cuba in 1939
- W. C. Fields and Me (1976) – biographical drama film based on a memoir by Carlotta Monti, mistress of actor W. C. Fields during the last 14 years of his life

== 1977 ==
- A Bridge Too Far (1977) – epic war film depicting Operation Market Garden, a failed Allied operation in Nazi-occupied Netherlands during World War II
- Advantage (Bulgarian: Авантаж) (1977) – Bulgarian drama film revealing the story of "the Rooster", a thief and former prisoner who tries to adjust to a new, socialist Bulgaria after 9 September 1944
- The Amazing Howard Hughes (1977) – biographical drama television film about American aviation pioneer and filmmaker Howard Hughes
- Antonio Gramsci: The Days of Prison (Italian: Antonio Gramsci: i giorni del carcere) (1977) – Italian biographical drama film about Antonio Gramsci's political career and private life
- Barefoot Gen: Explosion of Tears (Japanese: はだしのゲン 涙の爆発) (1977) – Japanese war drama film telling the story of the six-year-old boy Gen Nakaoka, living in Hiroshima around the time of the US atomic bombing of the city
- Bethune (1977) – Canadian biographical drama television film based on the true story of Canadian doctor Norman Bethune
- Beyond Good and Evil (Italian: Al di là del bene e del male) (1977) – Italian-French biographical drama film following the intense relationship formed in the 1880s between Friedrich Nietzsche, Lou Salomé and Paul Rée
- Black Journal (Italian: Gran bollito) (1977) – Italian comedy film loosely based on real-life serial killer Leonarda Cianciulli, who killed three women between 1939 and 1940, and turned their bodies into soap and teacakes
- The Black Panther (1977) – British crime film about the real life ex-military criminal Donald Neilson, known as the "Black Panther"
- Brigham (1977) – biographical drama film about American religious figure Brigham Young
- Brothers (1977) – biographical drama film paralleling the real life stories of Black radicals Angela Davis, George Jackson, and Jonathan Jackson
- Chanakya Chandragupta (Telugu: చాణక్య చంద్రగుప్తుడు) (1977) – Indian Telugu-language historical drama film based on the 3rd century BC Maurya Emperor Chandragupta Maurya and his mentor Chanakya
- Christmas Miracle in Caufield, U.S.A. (1977) – drama television film based on the true story of coal miners who became trapped underground in a cave-in on Christmas Eve, 1951
- The Consequence (German: Die Konsequenz) (1977) – West German romantic drama film based on the 1975 autobiographical novel of the same name by Alexander Ziegler
- Death Is My Trade (German: Aus einem deutschen Leben) (1977) – West German biographical drama film based on the real Rudolf Höß, commandant of the concentration camp Auschwitz
- The Death of Richie (1977) – drama television film about the 1972 death of George Richard "Richie" Diener Jr. at the hands of his father, who was ultimately not charged with the shooting death of his son
- Eleanor and Franklin: The White House Years (1977) – biographical drama television film telling the story of Franklin and Eleanor Roosevelt during their 12-year stay at the White House
- The French Woman (French: Madame Claude) (1977) – French drama film inspired by the life of French brothel madam Madame Claude
- Greased Lightning (1977) – biographical action film based loosely on the true life story of Wendell Scott, the first Black NASCAR race winner and later a 2015 NASCAR Hall of Fame inductee
- The Greatest (1977) – biographical sport drama film about the life of boxer Muhammad Ali, in which Ali plays himself
- Hardcore (1977) – British comedy film depicting a highly fictionalised account of the life of Richmond, who was a leading pin-up in the 1970s
- Hitler: A Film from Germany (German: Hitler, ein Film aus Deutschland) (1977) – international co-production experimental biographical film about the life of Adolf Hitler
- Hughes and Harlow: Angels in Hell (1977) – biographical drama film about the relationship between Howard Hughes and Jean Harlow
- In the Matter of Karen Ann Quinlan (1977) – biographical drama television film about Karen Ann Quinlan
- Jallian Wala Bagh (Hindi: जलियांवाला बाग) (1977) – Indian Hindi-language historical film based on the Jallianwala Bagh massacre, also known as the Amritsar massacre, where in 1919 Colonel Reginald Dyer ordered troops under his command to fire into a crowd of unarmed Indian 379 civilians, killing
- Jesus of Nazareth (Italian: Gesù di Nazareth) (1977) – British-Italian Christian drama miniseries dramatizing the birth, life, ministry, crucifixion and resurrection of Jesus
- John Hus (1977) – biographical drama film about the 14th-century Czech church reformer Jan Hus
- Johnny, We Hardly Knew Ye (1977) – biographical drama television film focusing on John F. Kennedy's first run for a congressional seat in 1946
- Julia (1977) – war drama film based on a chapter from Lillian Hellman's 1973 book Pentimento about the author's relationship with a lifelong friend, Julia, who fought against the Nazis in the years prior to World War II
- Karate for Life (Japanese: 空手バカ一代) (1977) – Japanese martial arts film about the martial arts master Mas Oyama
- The Lincoln Conspiracy (1977) – drama film dramatizing certain conspiracy theories concerning the 1865 assassination of U.S. President Abraham Lincoln
- Looking for Mr. Goodbar (1977) – crime drama film inspired by the 1973 murder of New York City schoolteacher Roseann Quinn
- Lucio Flavio (Portuguese: Lúcio Flávio, o Passageiro da Agonia) (1977) – Brazilian crime drama film about Lúcio Flávio, a famous bandit in Rio de Janeiro in the 1970s
- MacArthur (1977) – biographical war film about General Douglas MacArthur covering his war exploits during World War Two and the Korean War
- Mount Hakkoda (Japanese: 八甲田山) (1977) – Japanese drama film based on the novelist Jirō Nitta's recounting of the Hakkōda Mountains incident
- My Daughter Hildegart (Spanish: Mi hija Hildegart) (1977) – Spanish biographical drama film based on an account of Eduardo de Guzmán's testimony; the plot moves back to 1933 Madrid, developing the story of Aurora Rodríguez and the path that led her to kill her daughter, wunderkind, sexology specialist, and progressivist pundit Hildegart Rodríguez Carballeira, conceived by Aurora as the fruit of eugenicist utopia
- Operation Stadium (Serbo-Croatian: Akcija stadion) (1977) – Yugoslav war drama film telling a true story about events in Zagreb in 1941 where Nazis and their collaborators organized the great gathering of students on Dubrava stadium intending to publicly separate Jews from them which would lead to future pogrom
- Operation Thunderbolt (Hebrew: מבצע יונתן) (1977) – Israeli historical drama film based on an actual event – the hijacking of a flight by terrorists and the freeing of Israeli hostages on 4 July 1976. The operation was known as (Operation Entebbe, military code name: "Operation Thunderbolt") at Entebbe Airport in Uganda
- Padre Padrone (1977) – Italian biographical drama film depicting a Sardinian shepherd who is terrorized by his domineering father and tries to escape by educating himself. He eventually becomes a celebrated linguist. The drama is based on an autobiographical book of the same title by Gavino Ledda
- The Private Files of J. Edgar Hoover (1977) – biographical drama film depicting a fictionalized chronicle of forty years in the life of FBI director J. Edgar Hoover, from his earliest days in the FBI in the 1920s until his death in 1972
- Pumping Iron (1977) – biographical drama film about the world of professional bodybuilding, with a focus on the 1975 IFBB Mr. Universe and 1975 Mr. Olympia competitions
- Raid on Entebbe (1977) – historical action drama television film based on the Entebbe raid, an Israeli military operation to free hostages at Entebbe Airport in Uganda, on 4 July 1976
- Rembrandt fecit 1669 (1977) – Dutch drama film about the final years of Rembrandt's life
- Roots (1977) – biographical drama miniseries depicting a dramatization of author Alex Haley's family line from ancestor Kunta Kinte's enslavement to his descendants' liberation, set during and after the era of slavery in the United States
- Rubens (Dutch: Rubens, schilder en diplomaat) (1977) – Belgian drama film based on the life of Flemish first-rate Baroque painter Pieter Pauwel Rubens
- Satyavan Savithri (Malayalam: സത്യവാൻ സാവിത്രി) (1977) – Indian Malayalam-language historical drama film telling the story of the legendary Savitri, a woman whose devotion matched Draupadi's as said by Markandeya to Yudhishthira's query
- Scott Joplin (1977) – biographical drama film based on the life of African-American composer and pianist Scott Joplin
- Shirdi Ke Sai Baba (Hindi: शिरडी के साईं बाबा) (1977) – Indian Hindi-language biographical drama film revolving around a sick child who wishes to be taken to Shirdi, where the guru Sai Baba of Shirdi lived
- Soldier of Orange (Dutch: Soldaat van Oranje) (1977) – Dutch romantic war film set around the German occupation of the Netherlands during World War II, and based on Erik Hazelhoff Roelfzema's autobiographical book of the same name
- Something for Joey (1977) – sport drama television film about the relationship between college football player John Cappelletti, and his younger brother Joey
- Tail Gunner Joe (1977) – biographical drama television film dramatizing the life of U.S. Senator Joseph R. McCarthy, a Wisconsin Republican who claimed knowledge of communist infiltration of the U.S. government during the 1950s
- Valentino (1977) – biographical drama film loosely based on the life of silent film actor Rudolph Valentino
- Viva Knievel! (1977) – biographical action film about Evel Knievel
- Walking Tall: Final Chapter (1977) – action crime drama film about Buford Pusser's last days as Sheriff of McNairy County, Tennessee in 1970 and his subsequent death in 1974
- Young Joe, the Forgotten Kennedy (1977) – biographical drama television film chronicling the life of Joseph P. Kennedy Jr., the older brother of John F. Kennedy who was killed in action in World War II, leaving behind aspirations to become the first Irish-Catholic president

== 1978 ==
- ... Gdziekolwiek jesteś panie prezydencie (1978) – Polish historical drama film about Polish statesman Stefan Starzyński
- A Death in Canaan (1978) – drama television film concerning the true-life story of a teenager who is put on trial for the murder of his mother in a small Connecticut town
- A Woman Called Moses (1978) – biographical drama miniseries about the life of Harriet Tubman, the escaped African American slave who led dozens of other African Americans from enslavement in the Southern United States to freedom in the Northern states and Canada
- Absolution (1978) – British mystery thriller film based on a true story of two students at a British boarding school who used the confessional to manipulate a rigid Catholic priest into becoming involved in murder
- The Adventures of Picasso (Swedish: Picassos äventyr) (1978) – Swedish biographical comedy film loosely based on Pablo Picasso's life
- American Hot Wax (1978) – biographical musical drama film telling the story of pioneering disc jockey Alan Freed, who in the 1950s helped introduce and popularize rock and roll, and is often credited with coining the term "rock 'n' roll"
- Born Again (1978) – biographical drama film depicting the involvement of Charles Colson in the Watergate scandal, his subsequent conversion to Christianity and his prison term
- Brass Target (1978) – suspense war film concerning General George S. Patton's fatal automobile crash
- The Brink's Job (1978) – comedy crime drama film based on the Brink's robbery of 1950 in Boston
- The Buddy Holly Story (1978) – biographical musical drama film which tells the life and career of rock and roll musician Buddy Holly
- The Chant of Jimmie Blacksmith (1978) – Australian biographical crime drama film about an exploited Aboriginal Australian who commits murder and goes into hiding – based on actual events surrounding Jimmy Governor
- Crash (1978) – drama television film based on the true story of the first crash of a wide-body aircraft, that of Eastern Air Lines Flight 401, a Lockheed L-1011 TriStar which crashed in the Florida Everglades near Miami on the night of 29 December 1972
- Deadman's Curve (1978) – biographical drama television film based on the musical careers of Jan Berry and Dean Torrence
- The Devil's Crown (1978) – British-French-Italian-Swiss historical drama miniseries dramatizing the reigns of three medieval Kings of England: Henry II and his sons Richard I and John
- Diary of Korean-Japanese War (Korean: 난중일기) (1978) – South Korean war drama film based on Admiral Yi Sun-sin's war diary, Nanjung ilgi, the film portrays Yi's life during the Imjin War
- Disraeli (1978) – British historical miniseries about the great statesman and Prime Minister of the United Kingdom, Benjamin Disraeli
- Duplessis (1978) – Canadian French-language historical miniseries telling the story of Maurice Duplessis, the controversial premier of Quebec from 1936 to 1939 and 1944 to 1959
- El diputado (1978) – Spanish drama film depicting a portrait of the society during the Spanish transition to democracy times
- The First Great Train Robbery (1978) – British heist comedy film based on an actual event, the Great Gold Robbery which took place on 15 May 1855 when 3 boxes of gold bullion and coins were stolen from the guard's van of the train service between London Bridge Station and Folkestone while it was being shipped to Paris
- First, You Cry (1978) – biographical drama television film about NBC News correspondent Betty Rollin's battle with breast cancer
- The Frenchman's Garden (Spanish: El huerto del francés) (1978) – Spanish psychological thriller film based on the Frenchman's garden serial murder case
- The Greatest Battle (Italian: Il grande attacco) (1978) – Italian-West German-Yugoslav action war film recreating the Battle of the Mareth Line in Tunisia
- I Miss You, Hugs and Kisses (1978) – Canadian mystery drama film based on the Peter Demeter murder case
- Ishi: The Last of His Tribe (1978) – biographical television film depicting the experiences of Theodora Kroeber's husband Alfred L. Kroeber, who made friends with Ishi, thought to be the last of his people, the Yahi tribe
- King (1978) – biographical historical drama miniseries based on the life of Martin Luther King Jr., the American civil rights leader
- Lillie (1978) – British biographical miniseries about the life of Lillie Langtry
- Little Boy Lost (1978) – Australian drama film based on the true story of Stephen Walls, a young Australian farm boy, whose disappearance galvanized a continent into action
- Little Mo (1978) – biographical sport television film telling the life story of Maureen Connolly, the 1950s American tennis player who was the first woman to win all four Grand Slam tournaments during the same calendar year, before an accident ended her tennis career at age 19
- The Lost Boys (1978) – British biographical drama miniseries about the relationship between Peter Pan creator J. M. Barrie and the Llewelyn Davies boys
- Midnight Express (1978) – Turkish-British-American prison thriller drama film centring on Billy Hayes, a young American student, who is sent to a Turkish prison for trying to smuggle hashish out of the country
- Molière (1978) – French historical drama film about the life of celebrated playwright Molière
- The Nativity (1978) – Christian biographical drama television film set around the Nativity of Jesus and based on the accounts in the canonical Gospels of Matthew and Luke, in the apocryphal gospels of Pseudo-Matthew and James, and in the Golden Legend
- One in a Million: The Ron LeFlore Story (1978) – biographical sport television film telling the story of Ron LeFlore, a troubled Detroit youth who rose from Michigan prisons to star in Major League Baseball with the Detroit Tigers
- The Other Side of the Mountain Part 2 (1978) – biographical romantic drama film about Jill Kinmont's life after the death of Dick Buek
- Poet and Muse (Finnish: Runoilija ja muusa) (1978) – Finnish drama film about the Finnish poet Eino Leino and the women of his life: a conflict-filled marriage with Freya Schultz and a love affair with the poet L. Onerva
- Pretty Baby (1978) – historical drama film focusing on a 12-year-old girl being raised in a brothel in the Storyville red-light district of New Orleans by her prostitute mother – based on the true account of a young girl who was sexually exploited by being forced into prostitution by her mother
- The Pyjama Girl Case (Italian: La ragazza dal pigiama giallo) (1978) – Italian giallo film based on a real story, the "Pyjama Girl" case, one of Australia's most well known unsolved murders
- Rainbow (1978) – biographical musical drama television film chronicling the early years of singer-actress Judy Garland
- Ruby and Oswald (1978) – drama television film about the assassination of United States President John F. Kennedy
- Stevie (1978) – American-British biographical drama film about the life of poet Stevie Smith.
- The Tailor from Ulm (German: Der Schneider von Ulm) (1978) – West German historical drama film telling the true story of a German pioneer aviator, Albrecht Berblinger, in the late 18th century
- The Toolbox Murders (1978) – slasher film following a series of violent murders centered around a Los Angeles apartment complex, followed by the kidnapping and disappearance of a teenage girl who resides there – marketed as being a dramatization of true events
- The Uranium Conspiracy (German: Agenten kennen keine Tränen or Restrisiko 100%) (1978) – Israeli-West German-Italian action thriller film focusing on the efforts of an espionage agent to secure a uranium shipment that has been targeted by an enemy power
- Violette Nozière (1978) – French-Canadian crime drama film about the teenage prostitute and murderer Violette Nozière, who poisoned her parents in 1933 France
- The Voyage of Charles Darwin (1978) – biographical historical miniseries depicting the life of Charles Darwin, focusing largely on his voyage on HMS Beagle
- Will Shakespeare (1978) – British historical drama miniseries depicting a dramatization of the life and times of the great poet William Shakespeare
- The Winds of Kitty Hawk (1978) – biographical drama television film about the Wright brothers and their invention of the first successful powered heavier-than-air flying machine, the Wright Flyer
- Ziegfeld: The Man and His Women (1978) – biographical drama television film based on the life of theater impresario Florenz Ziegfeld

== 1979 ==
- 1941 (1979) – war comedy film loosely based on what has come to be known as the Great Los Angeles Air Raid of 1942, as well as the bombardment of the Ellwood oil refinery, near Santa Barbara, by a Japanese submarine
- A Glass of Water (Russian: Стакан воды) (1979) – Soviet historical comedy television film set in the court of Queen Anne of Great Britain at the start of the 18th century
- Agatha (1979) – British mystery thriller film focusing on renowned crime writer Agatha Christie's famous 11-day disappearance in 1926
- The Amityville Horror (1979) – supernatural horror film based on the alleged paranormal experiences of the Lutz family who briefly resided in the Amityville, New York home where convicted killer Ronald DeFeo Jr. committed the mass murder of his family in 1974
- Babek (Azerbaijani: Babək) (1979) – Soviet historical drama film based on the life of revolutionary leader Babak Khorramdin, whose rebellion against the Abbasid Caliphate spread throughout Iran and Azerbaijan, spanning more than two decades
- The Bell Jar (1979) – biographical drama film based on the semi-autobiographical book by Sylvia Plath
- Birth of the Beatles (1979) – biographical drama film focusing on the early history of the Beatles
- Blind Ambition (1979) – biographical drama miniseries focusing on the Watergate coverup and based on the memoirs of former White House counsel John Dean and his wife Maureen
- The Brontë Sisters (French: Les Sœurs Brontë) (1979) – French biographical drama film following the bleak lives of the Brontë sisters in less than a ten-year span; beginning in 1834, when, at the age of seventeen, Branwell painted the famous portrait of his three sisters, in which he originally included his own image, and ends around 1852 when Charlotte, now a famous author, is the only surviving sibling
- Bruce Lee's Secret (Cantonese: 李小龍嘅秘密) (1979) – Hong Kong martial arts action film about the life of Bruce Lee
- Caligula (Italian: Caligola) (1979) – American-Italian historical drama film focusing on the rise and fall of the Roman Emperor Caligula
- Can You Hear the Laughter? The Story of Freddie Prinze (1979) – biographical drama television film about the life of stand-up comedian and actor Freddie Prinze
- The Canal (Turkish: Kanal) (1979) – Turkish drama film about the Warsaw Uprising
- Christ Stopped at Eboli (Italian: Cristo si è fermato a Eboli) (1979) – Italian-French drama film giving an account of Carlo Levi's exile from 1935 to 1936 to Grassano and Aliano, remote towns in southern Italy, in the region of Lucania which is known today as Basilicata
- Companys, procés a Catalunya (1979) – Spanish Catalan-language drama film based on the last months of the life of the President of Catalonia, Lluís Companys, in which he shows his detention by the Nazis and his subsequent execution by the Spanish Francoists
- Crossbar (1979) – Canadian sport drama television film depicting a fictionalized account of the career of Canadian amputee athlete Arnie Boldt
- Dawn! (1979) – Australian biographical sport drama film about the three-time Olympic gold medallist swimmer Dawn Fraser
- The Divine Emma (Czech: Božská Ema) (1979) – Czechoslovak biographical drama film depicting an account of operatic soprano Emmy Destinn's life
- Dummy (1979) – biographical drama television film dramatizing the life of Donald Lang, an African–American deaf man who was acquitted of the murders of two prostitutes in Chicago, Illinois
- Elvis (1979) – biographical drama television film about the famous rock singer Elvis Presley
- Escape from Alcatraz (1979) – prison thriller film based on the 1962 prisoner escape from the maximum security prison on Alcatraz Island
- Friendly Fire (1979) – war drama television film telling the real-life story of Peg Mullen, a woman from rural Iowa who with her husband works against government obstacles to uncover the actual details and facts about the death of their son Michael, an Army infantry soldier killed by "friendly fire" in February 1970 during the Vietnam War
- The Great Riviera Bank Robbery (1979) – British heist film based on a bank robbery masterminded by Albert Spaggiari in 1976, members of a neo-fascist group team up with professional criminals to rob the safe deposit vault of a bank in a French resort town
- Guyana: Crime of the Century (1979) – Mexican exploitation drama film based on the Jonestown massacre
- Heartland (1979) – Western drama film depicting a stark depiction of early homestead life in the American West – based on a memoir by Elinore Pruitt Stewart, titled Letters of a Woman Homesteader
- The House on Garibaldi Street (1979) – drama television film about the Mossad operation that captured Adolf Eichmann in Argentina in 1960 and returned him to Israel for trial
- The Hussy (French: La drôlesse) – French drama film about the kidnapping of an 11-year-old, who develops stockholm syndrome – based on actual events
- I Know Why the Caged Bird Sings (1979) – biographical drama television film describing the young and early years of American writer and poet Maya Angelou
- Ike (1979) – historical biographical drama miniseries about the life of Dwight D. Eisenhower, mostly focusing on his time as Supreme Commander in Europe during World War II
- Iron Gustav (German: Der eiserne Gustav) (1979) – West German drama miniseries about a Berlin taxi driver still using a horse-drawn carriage, and the hardships he faces due to increasing competition from motor cars in the Weimar Era
- Jesus (1979) – Christian drama film depicting the life of Jesus Christ primarily using the Gospel of Luke as the main basis for the story
- Kaala Patthar (Hindi: काला पत्थर) (1979) – Indian Hindi-language action disaster film based on the Chasnala mining disaster
- The Last Ride of the Dalton Gang (1979) – Western television film following the story of the Dalton Gang from their beginnings in Montgomery County, Kansas to their attempt to rob two banks simultaneously in Coffeyville, Kansas
- The Life of Henry the Fifth (1979) – British war drama film telling the story of King Henry V of England, focusing on events immediately before and after the Battle of Agincourt during the Hundred Years' War
- Meera (Hindi: मीरा) (1979) – Indian Hindi-language historical drama film based on the life of Meera, a Hindu saint-poet who renounced princely comforts in pursuit of her love for Lord Krishna
- Meetings with Remarkable Men (1979) – British biographical drama film involving G. I. Gurdjieff and his companions' search for truth in a series of dialogues and vignettes
- The Miracle Worker (1979) – biographical drama television film based on the life of Helen Keller and Annie Sullivan's struggles to teaching her
- Mr. Horn (1979) – Western biographical miniseries telling the story of frontiersman Tom Horn, and his career as a cavalry scout, a tracker, a range detective, and the final events in his life that led to his tragic death
- Norma Rae (1979) – drama film based on the true story of Crystal Lee Sutton
- Ogro (Spanish: Operación Ogro) (1979) – Italian-Spanish thriller drama film based on true events in Spain during the early 1970s and is based on the eponymous book by Julen Agirre (pseudonym of Eva Forest)
- On Giant's Shoulders (1979) – mystery drama television film about the early life of thalidomide victim Terry Wiles
- The Onion Field (1979) – neo-noir crime drama film chronicling the kidnapping of two plainclothes LAPD officers by a pair of criminals during a traffic stop and the subsequent murder of one of the officers
- Orphan Train (1979) – adventure drama television film based on the Orphan Train Movement, associated with the early days of Children's Aid and similar organizations
- Over the Edge (1979) – coming-of-age crime drama film inspired by events described in a 1973 San Francisco Examiner article entitled "Mousepacks: Kids on a Crime Spree" by Bruce Koon and James A. Finefrock, which reported on young kids vandalizing property in Foster City, California
- Prince Regent (1979) – British historical drama miniseries depicting the life of George IV from his youth time as prince regent and his reign as King
- Putting Things Straight (German: Ich räume auf) (1979) – German biographical drama film depicting a dispute between poet Else Lasker-Schüler and her publishers
- Riel (1979) – Canadian biographical drama television film about Métis leader Louis Riel
- Roots: The Next Generations (1979) – historical drama miniseries tracing the lives of Kunta Kinte's descendants in Henning, Tennessee, from 1882 to 1967
- The Secret of Enigma (Polish: Sekret Enigmy) (1979) – Polish historical drama film about three polish mathematicians who in late 1932 reconstructed the sight-unseen Nazi German military Enigma cipher machine, aided by limited documents obtained by French military intelligence
- The Sewers of Paradise (French: Les Égouts du paradis) (1979) – French action drama film based on a 1976 heist by Albert Spaggiari
- S.O.S. Titanic (1979) – American-British drama disaster television film depicting the doomed 1912 maiden voyage from the perspective of three distinct groups of passengers in first, second and third class
- Takeoff (Russian: Взлёт) (1979) – Soviet biographical drama film about the Russian rocket scientist Konstantin Tsiolkovsky
- The Triangle Factory Fire Scandal (1979) – historical drama television film chronicling the 25 March 1911 Triangle Shirtwaist Factory fire in which 146 garment workers died
- Undercover with the KKK (1979) – drama television film telling the true story of Gary Thomas Rowe Jr., who infiltrated the Ku Klux Klan as an undercover agent and then testified as a key witness for the prosecution during the trial of several other Klansmen
- Vengeance Is Mine (Japanese: 復讐するは我にあり) (1979) – Japanese crime drama film depicting the true story of serial killer Akira Nishiguchi, changing the protagonist's name to Iwao Enokizu
- Vlad Țepeș (1979) – Romanian historical drama film recounting the story of Vlad the Impaler (also known as Vlad Dracula), the mid-15th century Voivode of Wallachia, and his fights with the Ottoman Turks on the battlefield and with the Boyars in his court
- When Hell Was in Session (1979) – war drama television film based on a memoir by U.S. Navy Rear Admiral Jeremiah Denton, recounting his experiences as an American prisoner of war (POW) during the Vietnam War
- The White Mazurka (Polish: Biały mazur) (1979) – Polish historical film about Ludwik Waryński
- Zulu Dawn (1979) – adventure war film about the historical Battle of Isandlwana between British and Zulu forces in 1879 in South Africa
