= A Bag of Marbles (2017 film) =

2017 French drama film

- French film poster
- French: Un sac de billes
- Directed by: Christian Duguay
- Written by: Christian Duguay; Benoît Guichard; Jonathan Allouche; Alexandra Geismar; Laurent Zeitoun
- Based on: Un sac de billes by Joseph Joffo
- Produced by: Nicolas Duval Adassovsky; Joe Iacono; Laurent Zeitoun; Yann Zenou; Lyse Lafontaine; Gaëtan David; Tanguy Dekeyser; Marc Jenny; Jean-Charles Levy; André Logie
- Starring: Dorian Le Clech; Batyste Fleurial; Patrick Bruel; Elsa Zylberstein; Bernard Campan
- Cinematography: Christophe Graillot
- Edited by: Olivier Gajan
- Music by: Armand Amar
- Production companies: Quad Productions; Main Journey
- Distributed by: Gaumont
- Release dates: 15 January 2017 (Paris premiere); 18 January 2017
- Running time: 110 minutes
- Countries: France; Canada; Czech Republic
- Language: French
- Budget: $21.4 million
- Box office: $9.1 million

A Bag of Marbles (French: Un sac de billes) is a 2017 French drama film directed by Christian Duguay, based on the autobiographical novel A Bag of Marbles by Joseph Joffo. It is the second time the novel has been made into a film after Un sac de billes (1975). The film won the Best Narrative Audience Award at the Philadelphia Jewish Film Festival 37. The film was also a jury prize competitor at the Atlanta Jewish Film Festival.

== Plot ==
In occupied France during World War II, two young Jewish brothers, Maurice and Joseph, are sent by their parents to the Zone libre, and display courage, intelligence and ingenuity as they escape the occupiers and try to reunite their family.

At the very end of the film, Maurice and Joseph, who became barbers like their father, are shown in the present day (2017) in a Paris cafe.

== Cast and characters ==
- Dorian Le Clech as Joseph
- Batyste Fleurial as Maurice
- Patrick Bruel as Roman
- Elsa Zylberstein as Anna
- Bernard Campan as Amboise Mancelier
- Kev Adams as Ferdinand
- Christian Clavier as Doctor Rosen
- César Domboy as Henri
- Ilian Bergala as Albert
- Emile Berling as Raoul Mancelier
- Jocelyne Desverchère as Marcelle Mancelier
- Coline Leclère as Françoise
- Holger Daemgen as Alois Brunner
- Michael Smadja as Simon
- Lucas Prisor as German Controller
- Frédéric Épaud as the priest Buffa

== Reception ==
On review aggregator website Rotten Tomatoes, the film holds an approval rating of 83% based on 24 reviews, and an average rating of 7.3/10. On Metacritic, the film has a weighted average score of 55 out of 100, based on 7 critics, indicating "mixed or average reviews".

Hannah Brown of The Jerusalem Post called A Bag of Marbles "One of the best movies told about the holocaust from a child’s point of view".

The film was shot in the south of France and in Žatec, Czech Republic.
