= Solidarity Roundabout =

Coordinates: 51°46′45″N 19°28′52″E

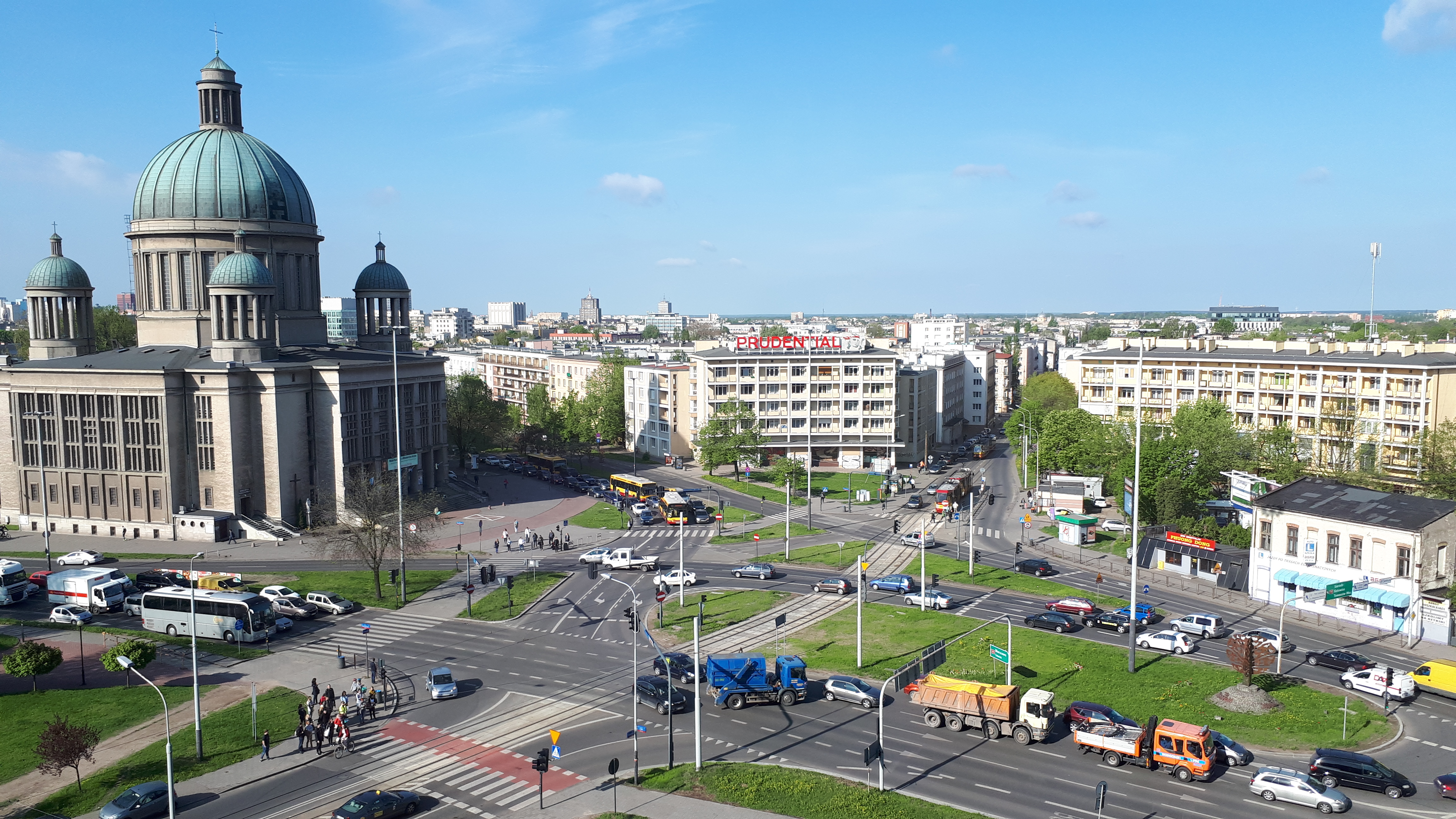
Roundabout of Solidarity in 2018

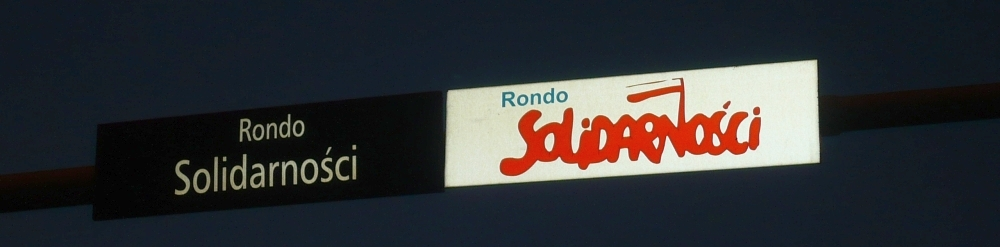
A name plate for the interchange, introduced in 2005

The Roundabout of Solidarity (Polish: Rondo Solidarności) is a major road interchange in the Polish city of Łódź, combining five streets and serving a transit traffic running through the city as part of Polish national road no. 14.

== History ==
The interchange was built in the late 1970s, being opened in 1977 as an actual roundabout converging three streets: Pomorska, Uniwersytecka and Kopcińskiego. Initially it was named after Ludwik Waryński - a theoretician of socialist movement in Poland.

In 2000 the interchange went under major reconstruction, which has led to the integration of roundabout with two nearest crossroads. The traffic was meant to be controlled by an intelligent traffic light control system, reacting to the intensity of incoming and outcoming traffic. Due to surface problems and traffic jams the interchange was slightly modified in 2003.

In 2005, to commemorate the 25. anniversary of the August 1980 strikes and signing the Gdańsk Agreement, Łódź City Council renamed the interchange to Roundabout of Solidarity. Along with the change of name a sculpture - The Tree of Solidarity (pol. Drzewko Solidarności) by Jacek Ojrzanowski - was put in the middle of an interchange.

== Characteristics ==
The interchange consists of 3 crossroads:

- Palki Avenue - Źródłowa St,
- Palki Avenue / Kopcińskiego St - Pomorska St,
- Kopcińskiego St - Pomorska St - Uniwersytecka St.

The crossroads are connected together with two short road sections allowing turning left and turning around on the interchange. Each of the crossroads has its own traffic light. Also, central part of the interchange has a form of a lawn island, crossed by tram tracks running along Pomorska street.

The layout of the interchange, combined with confusing road surface marking and massive traffic running between Palki Avenue and Kopcińskiego St, is commonly criticized as "confusing" and "dangerous". The site is often used for driving exams due to the close location of the institution responsible for those.

A concept for reconstruction of the interchange was brought up on 30 December 2008, by Autorska Pracownia Architektury "Projekt". This concept proposed a return to the original layout of the interchange before 2000, but with creating a tunnel underneath, in order to move a transit traffic from Palki Avenue to Kopcińskiego St away from the roundabout. However, as of 2019, no plans for the reconstruction of the interchange were marked as scheduled for execution.
