= Don Lang =

Don Lang may refer to:

- Don Lang (musician) (1925–1992), trombone player and band leader
- Don Lang (third baseman) (1915–2010), third baseman in Major League Baseball
- Donald Lang, accused of murdering prostitutes in Chicago
