= Marianne Leconte =

Marianne Leconte (died 28 August 2026) was a French science fiction novelist, anthologist, and publisher. In 1979, she founded the “Titres/SF” series at JC Lattès.

== Publications ==
=== Novels ===
- L'Araignée de mer: roman. Denoël. 1993. ISBN 978-2-207-24042-7. OCLC 33209157.
- La comtesse de la villa Palmyre: roman. Flammarion. 2000. ISBN 978-2-08-067873-7.
- Le Temple du Dragon, Mango, 2008
- Le manuscrit de Grenade: roman. Pygmalion fantasy. Pygmalion. 2011. ISBN 978-2-7564-0456-1.

=== Anthologies ===
- Femmes au futur, Marabout science-fiction, 1976
- Les Champs de l'infini, Le Masque science-fiction, 1977
- Les Pièges de l'espace, Le Masque science-fiction, 1977
- Theodore Sturgeon, Les Enfants de Sturgeon, Le Masque science-fiction, 1977
- Le Livre d'or de la science-fiction : Theodore Sturgeon, Presses Pocket science-fiction, 1978
- Theodore Sturgeon, Fantômes et sortilèges, Le Masque fantastique, 1978
- Theodore Sturgeon, Méduse, collection Le Masque Science-fiction, 1978
- Le Livre d'or de la science-fiction : Christopher Priest, Presses Pocket science-fiction, 1980
- Theodore Sturgeon, Amour, impair et manque, Jean-Claude Lattès, 1981

=== Practical guides ===
- Maigrir avec les hautes calories, Trévise, 1984
- Découvrez vous-même votre avenir par les tarots de Marseille, Trévise, 1986
- Poids idéal et bon moral avec la méthode chinoise du Ying-yang, Jean-Claude Lattès, 1988
- Psycho tarot, Jean-Claude Lattès, 1996
- L'ABC des tarots, Marabout, 1997
- Maigrir, le nouveau bon sens, Ramsay, 2000
