= JC Lattès =

French publisher

- Parent company: Hachette Livre
- Founded: 1968; 57 years ago
- Founder: Jean-Claude Lattès and Jacques Lanzmann
- Country of origin: France
- Publication types: Books
- Official website: www.editions-jclattes.fr

JC Lattès is a French publishing house. A division of Hachette Livre since 1981, JC Lattès' catalogue includes the works of Dan Brown, as well as Fifty Shades of Grey by E. L. James.

Founder Jean-Claude Lattès died on 17 January 2018.

== Background ==
JC Lattès was founded in 1968 as Edition Speciale by Jean-Claude Lattès and Jacques Lanzmann. Lattès took it over in 1972, renamed it Éditions Jean-Claude Lattès, and ran it until 1981. JC Lattès currently has a catalog of more than 1000 titles. Its major successes include:

- Un Sac de billes (A Bag of Marbles) by Joseph Joffo
- Le Vent du soir (The Wind in the Evening) by Jean d'Ormesson
- Le Nabab (The Nabob) by Irène Frain
- Léon l'Africain (Leo Africanus) by Amin Maalouf
- Fifty Shades of Grey by E. L. James
- The Red Scarves
- The Officers
- Geisha

Over the years, JC Lattès has published general-interest books by French and foreign authors, including both fiction and non-fiction. Its authors have included Scott Turow, Dean Koontz, James Patterson, Jean-François Parot, Jean d'Aillon, Åke Edwardson, Lars Christensen Saabye, and Karin Fossum.

== Notable novels in French ==
- Un sac de billes by Joseph Joffo
- Leo Africanus by Amin Maalouf
- Le Code De Vinci by Dan Brown
