= A Bag of Marbles =

1973 novel by Joseph Joffo

- First edition
- Author: Joseph Joffo
- Original title: Un sac de billes
- Language: French
- Series: D. Carter
- Genre: Autobiographical novel
- Publisher: Guilde du Livre
- Publication date: 1973
- Publication place: France
- Media type: Print (Hardback & Paperback)
- Pages: 380 pp

A Bag of Marbles (French: Un sac de billes) is a Second World War autobiographical novel by the French Jewish author Joseph Joffo. It tells the story of his flight, as a small boy, with his brother Maurice to escape from Nazi occupied France to the Zone Libre. Joffo was refused by many publishers before being encouraged by the newly founded publishing house Éditions Jean-Claude Lattès to get the help of an editor to publish the text. The book was a phenomenal best-seller, being made into a major film two years later.

== Plot summary ==
Joseph is an ordinary boy with ordinary interests; he dislikes lessons and enjoys playing marbles with his friends. But in 1941, when Paris is occupied by the Nazis, his childhood comes to an end. Never before having known what it means to be a Jew, Joseph is forced to wear a yellow star. Due to his schoolmate's admiration of the yellow star, he makes his first business transaction with Zérati, a friend from school: his yellow star exchanged for a bag of marbles.

The racism which results from the occupation leaves only one possibility to Joseph and his brother Maurice: they must flee. Their father, who owns a hairdressing salon, advises them what to do when they leave. Despite having been driven from their home because of their Jewish identity, they are told they must never let anyone know that they are Jews.

They are attempting to escape from the grasp of Hitler and his S.S. men as they infiltrate France. They travel through northern France to the de-militiarised zone in the South. They cross the Demarcation Line in the dead of night with the help of another young boy called Raymond. Once into safe France they travel down to Menton via Marseille, where they spend a day taking in the sea - something they have never seen before. The boys then spend four months in Menton with their brothers, Henri and Albert, before having to leave the town for Nice, where their parents are waiting.

The boys spend the summer in Nice with their parents. But due to the surrender of the Italians, when they removed Mussolini in favor of Pietro Badoglio, and the arrival of the Germans in safe France, they have to flee quickly to "Moisson Nouvelle", a camp for boys run by the Vichy government. The boys are safe here for a while, and make many friends, until one day when they accompany the lorry driver Ferdinand into Nice where he leads them, unintentionally, straight into a Nazi trap. They are taken to the "Hotel Excelsior", the Nazi headquarters in the region. Fortunately, due to their carefully thought up lies and the persistence of a priest, they escape a month later, still alive but pretty rattled. Sadly, they soon learn of the arrest of their father, who had his papers with him at the time, which means it is no longer safe for the two youngsters to remain in Nice.

As the autumn turns to winter, Joseph and Maurice travel north to see their sister, where they learn that it is unsafe for them to stay; so they go to join their brothers in the Alpine resort of Aix-les-Bains. Here Maurice spends the rest of the war working in a bakery, and Joseph works for the owner of the village bookshop - a staunch Petainist. The two brothers also brush up with resistance fighters in the area, when Joseph has to pass on a secret message.

Joseph returns to Paris shortly after peace is announced, in an over-crowded train. Maurice returns by road, although in his typical style he also takes enough cheese to make a very large profit on! They are both re-united with their family in the salon – although sadly not their father, who was murdered in the Auschwitz concentration camp before the end of the war.

== Films and graphic novel ==
A 1975 film adaptation of the novel was directed by Jacques Doillon. This was followed by a 2017 film adaptation directed by Christian Duguay. A 2012 graphic novel adaptation by Kris and Vincent Bailly was nominated in the Will Eisner Comic Industry Awards as Best Reality-Based Work.
