= Büchergilde Gutenberg (Switzerland) =

Swiss book club

- Industry: Publishing
- Founded: 1925 (Zurich group); independent from 1933
- Headquarters: Zurich, Switzerland
- Members: 16,000 (1981)
- Parent: Büchergilde Gutenberg, Germany (from 2000)
- Website: buechergilde.ch

The Swiss Büchergilde Gutenberg ("Gutenberg Book Guild") is a book club based in Zurich. It grew out of the Büchergilde Gutenberg founded in Berlin in 1924 and became independent in 1933. By the 1960s it had more than 100,000 members. The idea was also taken up in French- and Italian-speaking Switzerland, by the Guilde du livre in Lausanne (1936) and the Ghilda del libro in Ticino (1944).

== History ==
The Swiss Büchergilde Gutenberg grew out of the Büchergilde Gutenberg founded in Berlin in 1924 by Bruno Dressler. Its aim was to supply its members with high-quality, inexpensive books. A Zurich guild group was founded in 1924, and an office was opened in Zurich in 1927. The Gleichschaltung ("coordination") of the Berlin guild by the National Socialists led to the independence of the Zurich guild in 1933; it was taken over by trade union federations. The Büchergilde worked closely with the guilds in Vienna and Prague until 1938. Its first president was Hans Oprecht, a publisher and Social Democratic member of the National Council, and its first managing director was Bruno Dressler.

With the publication of the Gildenbibliothek der Weltliteratur ("Guild library of world literature") from 1936, the number of members grew rapidly, from 1,000 in 1927 to 20,000 in 1938. By the 1960s the Büchergilde had developed into an organization with more than 100,000 members. Other book clubs increasingly competed with it. In 1981, after its membership had fallen to 16,000, it was sold to the Buchzentrum Hägendorf, which sold it back to the German guild in 2000. In 2002 the German guild relaunched the Büchergilde in Switzerland with its own distribution organization.

=== Guilde du livre and Ghilda del libro ===
The idea of the Büchergilde was also well received in French- and Italian-speaking Switzerland. In 1936 Albert Mermoud founded the Guilde du livre in Lausanne. In 1943 he created the Prix de la Guilde, endowed with 5,000 francs, whose jury included figures such as Charles Ferdinand Ramuz and Henry-Louis Mermod. In the 1950s and 1960s the Guilde du livre published several successful book series, among them a collection of classics. The book club ceased its activities at the end of 1977.

In Ticino, Guglielmo Canevascini founded the Ghilda del libro in 1944; it existed until the 1950s. Among other works, it published books by Elio Vittorini and, together with the Italian publisher Mondadori, Addio alle armi, the Italian translation of Ernest Hemingway's A Farewell to Arms. Because of competition, the Ghilda del libro had already stopped printing books at the end of 1948.

== Bibliography ==
- A. Mermoud, La Guilde du livre, 1987
- B. Messerschmidt, "... von Deutschland herübergekommen"?, 1989
