= The Other Side of Madness =

- Directed by: Frank Howard
- Written by: Ron Shepherd
- Screenplay by: J. J. Wilkie Jr.
- Produced by: Wade Williams
- Starring: Debbie Duff; Brian Klinknett; Phyllis Estes; Paula Shannon; Erica Bigelow; Richard Kaplan; Gary Donovan; Linda Van; Ray Pitts
- Cinematography: Frank Howard
- Edited by: Frank Howard
- Music by: Sean Bonniwell
- Production companies: Auric, Ltd.
- Distributed by: Prestige Pictures Releasing Corp.
- Release date: December 1971
- Running time: 81 minutes
- Country: United States
- Language: English
- Budget: $160,000

The Other Side of Madness is a 1971 film directed by Frank Howard and produced by Wade Williams. The film is based on the crimes of the Manson Family, made while the trial was still ongoing. The film was briefly re-released in 1976 under the title The Helter Skelter Murders.

== Plot ==
The majority of the film takes place in flashbacks from the perspective of various witnesses during the Manson trial. The entire second half of the film is dedicated to the Tate murders, attempting to recreate them based on the evidence and testimony available to the public at the time.

== Production ==
Several scenes of the film were shot at Spahn Ranch, the location used as the primary residence of the Manson Family, making it possibly the last film to contain footage of the ranch before it was destroyed by a wildfire in September, 1970. The film features the song Mechanical Man written and sung by Charles Manson. A promotional record featuring both Mechanical Man and another Manson song, Garbage Dump, was later released. Due to legal issues, no names, with the exception of "Charlie", are mentioned in the film at any point. Producer Wade Williams claimed that legal difficulties threatened any sort of release until he showed the film to the lawyers in the Tate murder trial, all of whom he claimed were "impressed with its accuracy". Williams claimed that the film would utilise a technique known as "Auramation" which was described as a "special cellular film treatment designed to heighten or depress the emotions of the viewer by subliminal monochromatic suggestion", although in a 2020 interview, Williams reveled that this was simply fabricated in an attempt to get the film more press attention.

== Release ==
The film received a DVD release, under the Helter Skelter Murders title, on October 2, 2001. The film was released under its original title on both DVD and Blu-ray on November 24, 2020.

== Reception ==
The film received mixed to positive reviews on initial release, with Variety calling it "Far from an ordinary cheapie", and Boxoffice calling it "a well-made film of its type" while also calling its subject matter "unsavory". Other reviews were far more critical, with the Kansas City Times calling it a "tasteless movie in every way". Retrospective reviews for the film have generally been positive. Critic Brad Jones stated that the film "is at least shot with some level of ambitiousness" while criticising that he felt the film relied too heavily on the audience already being well versed in the facts of the case.
