= Biały mazur =

- Directed by: Wanda Jakubowska
- Written by: Wanda Jakubowska
- Cinematography: Stefan Matyjaszkiewicz
- Music by: Witold Rudziński
- Release date: 1979
- Running time: 153 minutes
- Country: Poland
- Language: Polish

Biały mazur (The White Mazurka) is a Polish historical film. It was released in 1979.

Biały mazur is a biographical film about Ludwik Waryński.

== Cast ==
- Tomasz Grochoczyński as Ludwik Waryński
- Anna Chodakowska as Filipina Płaskowicka
- Aldona Grochal as Aleksandra Jentysówna
- Wojciech Alaborski as Henryk Dulęba
- Mieczysław Grąbka as Stanisław Kunicki
- Grzegorz Warchoł as Stanisław Mendelson
- Grażyna Barszczewska as Maria Jankowska
- Emilian Kamiński as Szymon Dickstein
- Ewa Dałkowska as Wiera Zasulicz
- Jerzy Rogulski as Ignacy Hryniewiecki
- Mieczysław Hryniewicz as Hieronim Truszkowski
- Maciej Góraj as Józef Szmaus
- Tatiana Sosna-Sarno as Anna Sieroszewska
- Franciszek Pieczka as Walery Wróblewski
- Władysław Strzelczyk as Aleksander III Romanow
- Marek Siudym as Uziembło
- Marian Dziędziel as Erazm Kobylański
- Halina Gryglaszewska
- Stanisław Jaroszyński
- Jerzy Moes
- Ryszard Olesiński as Stanisław Waryński
- Jacek Andrucki as Józef Pławiński
- Andrzej Głoskowski
