= The Frenchman's Garden =

- Film poster
- Spanish: El huerto del francés
- Directed by: Jacinto Molina
- Screenplay by: Jacinto Molina; Antonio Fos
- Starring: Mª José Cantudo; Ágata Lys
- Cinematography: Polo Villaseñor
- Edited by: José Luis Peláez
- Music by: Ángel Arteaga
- Production company: Laro Films
- Release date: 5 June 1978
- Country: Spain
- Language: Spanish

The Frenchman's Garden (Spanish: El huerto del francés) is a 1978 Spanish rural psycho-thriller film directed by Jacinto Molina (Paul Naschy) based on the Frenchman's garden serial murder case. It stars María José Cantudo and Ágata Lys.

== Plot ==
The plot deals about the crimes of Juan Aldije "el Francés" and José Muñoz Lopera in Peñaflor, province of Seville.

== Cast ==
- Paul Naschy as Juan Andrés Aldije "el Francés"
- José Calvo as José Muñoz Lopera
- María José Cantudo as Andrea
- Ágata Lys as Charo
- Silvia Tortosa as Amparo
- Julia Saly as Elvira
- Yolanda Ríos as Socorro
- Nélida Quiroga as comadrona
- Carlos Casaravilla as don Antonio
- José Nieto as don Miguel
- Luis Ciges as verdugo

== Production ==
A Laro Films production, the film was shot in 1977 in locations including the area where the real crimes took place in.

== Release ==
The film was released theatrically in Spain on 5 June 1978. The film was restored by Cultural Diversity Films and selected for screening at the 2020 Sitges Film Festival.

== Reception ==
Ángel Sala described the film as "a sort of bloodstained Julio Romero de Torres painting, which satisfactorily reconstructs the period".

== See also ==
- List of Spanish films of 1978
