= Lost in the Bush =

- Directed by: Peter Dodds
- Written by: Peter Dodds
- Based on: story by Les Blake
- Starring: Gabrielle Bulle
- Cinematography: Lee Wright
- Edited by: Peter Dodds
- Music by: Geoff D'Ombran
- Production companies: Audio-Visual Education Centre; Education Department of Victoria
- Release date: 13 June 1973
- Running time: 64 minutes
- Country: Australia
- Language: English

Lost in the Bush is a 1973 Australian film based on the true story of three siblings who got lost in the Victorian bush for several days in 1864. They were discovered through the help of some aboriginal trackers including Dick-a-Dick.

== Cast ==
- Gabrielle Bulle as Jane Cooper
- Colin Freckleton as Isaac Cooper
- Richard McClelland as Frank Duff
- Adrian Crick
- Barbara Maroske
- Don Mitchell
- Bill Tregonning

== Production ==
The film was made for schools by the Victorian government. Shooting began in February 1972 near the Wimmera town of Horsham.
