= A Bag of Marbles (1975 film) =

- Film poster
- French: Un sac de billes
- Directed by: Jacques Doillon
- Written by: Jacques Doillon; Denis Ferraris, after the novel by Joseph Joffo
- Starring: Richard Constantini; Paul-Eric Shulmann; Joseph Goldenberg
- Cinematography: Yves Lafaye
- Edited by: Noëlle Boisson
- Music by: Philippe Sarde
- Production companies: Les Films Christian Fechner; Renn Productions
- Distributed by: AMLF
- Release date: 10 December 1975
- Running time: 105 minutes
- Country: France
- Language: French

A Bag of Marbles (French: Un sac de billes) is a 1975 French film based on the 1973 autobiographical novel Un sac de billes by Joseph Joffo. Doillon made use of mainly non-professional actors, as also in his next film with children, La Drôlesse (1979).

Among the non-professional actors, the father - who is captured and sent to Auschwitz - is played by Jo Goldenberg, owner of the famous deli at 7, Rue des Rosiers in Paris's Jewish district, which 7 years after the film was the site of the Chez Jo Goldenberg restaurant attack.

== Cast ==
- Richard Constantini : young Joseph
- Paul-Eric Shulmann : young Maurice
- Joseph Goldenberg : their father
- Reine Bartève : their mother
- Hubert Drac : Henri
- Gilles Laurent : Albert
- Michel Robin : Mancelier
- Dominique Ducros : Françoise
- Stephan Meldegg : sous-officier salon de coiffure
- Axel Ganz : officier salon de coiffure
- Pierre Forget : the teacher
- Marc Eyraud : priest on train
- Hélène Calzarelli : young girl on train
- Yves Wecker : Raymond, le passeur
- Bernadette Le Saché : la réfugiée
- Antonino Faa Di Bruno : le vieux beau
- Antoine Neri : l'Italien de la bargue
- Max Vialle : le concierge
- Dominique Besnehard : le moniteur
- Alain Peysson : Ferdinand
- Hans Verner : l'officier allemand
- Dieter Schidor
