= Dummy (1979 film) =

1979 American made-for-television drama film

- Genre: Docudrama; Drama
- Based on: Dummy by Ernest Tidyman
- Screenplay by: Ernest Tidyman
- Directed by: Frank Perry
- Starring: Paul Sorvino; LeVar Burton; Brian Dennehy; Rose Gregorio; Gregg Henry
- Theme music composer: Gil Askey
- Country of origin: United States
- Original language: English

Production
- Executive producer: Frank Konigsberg
- Producers: Sam Manners; Ernest Tidyman
- Production location: Chicago, Illinois
- Cinematography: Gayne Rescher
- Editors: Donald R. Rode; Benjamin A. Weissman
- Running time: 96 min.
- Production company: The Königsberg Company

Original release
- Network: CBS
- Release: May 27, 1979

Dummy is a 1979 American made-for-television docudrama film starring LeVar Burton and Paul Sorvino. Based on Ernest Tidyman's nonfiction book of the same name, the film dramatizes the life of Donald Lang (portrayed by Burton), an African–American deaf man who was charged with the murders of Ernestine Williams and Earline Brown, two prostitutes in Chicago, Illinois.

== Plot ==
In 1965, Donald Lang is 19-year old African–American man of Chicago, Illinois who was born deaf. He has a loving mother who struggles to give him as normal an upbringing as possible and a brother and sister, Julius and Genettia, who are supportive as well. Due to not being formally taught how to communicate via sign language, Donald communicates with people by demonstrations. Despite his disability, he finds employment on the loading docks of Chicago and wins the respect of his fellow workers. One night after work, Donald visits a neighborhood bar where he leaves with Ernestine Williams, a prostitute. Ernestine is later discovered dead under her friend Mrs. Harrod's porch. Shortly thereafter, Donald is arrested at work and charged with the murder of Ernestine after Mrs. Harrod told police that she had seen Donald leave the bar with her.

Donald's case is handled by attorney Lowell J. Myers who is also hearing impaired. Investigating the crime, Myers becomes convinced Donald is innocent and another person committed the murder. Nevertheless, Donald is convicted and sent to a mental institution. After several years of appeals, Myers finally manages to have his client released making an eloquent appeal to the Supreme Court of Illinois that a deaf person is entitled to the same rights as a hearing person. In an ironic conclusion, after a few months of freedom, Donald is again arrested for the murder of Earline Brown, a prostitute who was seen with him, and was convicted of this murder as well.

== Cast ==
- LeVar Burton as Donald Lang, a 19–year old African–American man who is deaf, illiterate and only communicates by demonstrations. He works at a Chicago loading dock and is charged in the murders of two local prostitutes, but eventually acquitted due to his disability.
- Paul Sorvino as Lowell Myers; a deaf attorney who represents Donald. Believing he is innocent, Myers goes through great lengths to prove to the courts by discrediting witnesses and introducing reasonable doubts during Donald's jury trial.
- Brian Dennehy as Ragoti, Donald's boss at the Chicago loading dock.
- Rose Gregorio as Jean Markin
- Gregg Henry as Assistant D.A. Smith; assistant prosecutor in the case against Donald. He argues that despite Donald's disability he should be able to stand trial and prosecuted to the fullest extent of the law.
- Steven Williams as Julius Lang, Donald's older brother whom he lives with along with his younger sister Genettia in a public housing development. He believes his brother is innocent, telling Myers that Donald wouldn't hurt a soul.
- Holly Robinson as Genettia Lang, Donald's younger sister whom he lives with along with their older brother Julius.
- Frankie Hill as Ernestine Williams, a local prostitute who Donald is accused of killing.
- Helen Martin as Mrs. Harrod, bar patron and friend of Ernestine, who saw Donald and Ernestine leave the bar on the night of her death, and who later discovers Ernestine's body underneath her back porch. She dies before Ernestine's court appearance.

== Production ==
Dummy was filmed completely in Chicago, Illinois in March 1979. Chicago locations in the film include Washington Park Homes, a Chicago Housing Authority public housing project at East 44th streets and South Cottage Grove Avenue, and Cook County Jail.

== Awards and home media ==
The film won a Peabody Award and was nominated for the Primetime Emmy Award for Outstanding Television Movie at the 31st Primetime Emmy Awards. The film was released on DVD by the Warner Archive Collection in October 2011.

== See also ==
- List of films featuring the deaf and hard of hearing
