= María Esther Duffau =

Argentine football fan (1933–2008)

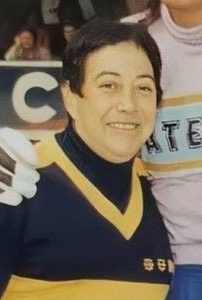
La Raulito in the 1980s.

María Esther Duffau (26 July 1933 - 30 April 2008) was an Argentine football fan.

== Early life ==
She started living on the streets of Argentina at the age of six after her mother died of tuberculosis.

== Career ==
She has been described as "Boca's most famous fan".

== Personal life ==
She was nicknamed "La Raulito".

== In popular culture ==
In 1975, a film about her story, La Raulito, was released.

== Death ==
She died on 30 April 2008.
