= Frenchman's garden murders =

Six serial murders in Spain

The Frenchman's garden murders were a series of six murders that were perpetrated in the town of Peñaflor, Province of Seville, Spain, between 1889 and 1904. The crimes were committed by Andrés Aldije Monmejá, known as El Francés for being a native of Agen, France, and José Muñoz Lopera. Both men had set up an illegal gambling house, robbing and murdering some of the visitors. After being condemned to the death penalty, both were executed by garrote on 31 October 1906, in the Pópulo Prison of Seville. Based on these facts, film director Paul Naschy made a film titled The Frenchman's Garden in 1977.
