= Donald Lang =

American deaf accused serial killer from Chicago, Illinois

- Lang mugshot taken by the Chicago Police Department on August 11, 1971.
- Born: 1945; Chicago, Illinois, U.S.
- Died: 2008 (aged 62–63); Chicago, Illinois, U.S.
- Height: 6 ft (1.8 m)
- Conviction: 1 count of murder
- Penalty: 14–25 years (overturned; 1975)

Details
- Victims: 2
- Span of crimes: 1965–1971
- Country: United States
- State: Illinois
- Date apprehended: August 11, 1971
- Imprisoned at: Cook County Jail

Donald Lang (born c. 1945 – died 2008) was an American accused serial killer from Chicago, Illinois. Lang was charged with having killed two prostitutes in Chicago, in 1965 and 1971. The cases achieved national attention because Lang could not be convicted as he was deaf, mute, unable to read or write, and did not know lip-reading or sign language.

== Background ==
Lang was six years old when his parents divorced; subsequently his mother could no longer afford tuition for his special training. Lang had worked at Chicago truck loading docks when he was charged with murder in 1965, shortly after the death of his mother. In November 1965, Lang had picked up 37-year-old prostitute, Ernestine Williams at a local bar. Williams was found stabbed to death the next day. After a witness told Chicago police Lang had been the last person seen with Williams, they located him at his home, a public housing apartment where he stayed with a younger sister and older brother. Police found blood stained clothes in Lang's home and he was arrested. When the case could not go to trial, Lang was ordered confined to a mental hospital in order to learn sign language so that he could stand trial. When this failed, his lawyer pressed for a trial; a key witness had died, the case was dismissed and Lang was freed in February 1971.

Five months after his release, another prostitute was killed in Chicago. On July 21, 1971, 29–year old Earline Brown was found dead in a hotel room on the city's west side. Blood stains were found on Lang's clothes and he was arrested again on August 11, 1971. The case went to trial. As one piece of evidence, prosecutors introduced a drawing Lang had made during his interrogation, showing a woman with an "X" drawn over her. Lang was convicted in January 1972 by a jury and sentenced to 14–25 years in prison. In both cases Lang was represented by the deaf attorney Lowell J. Myers. The verdict was overturned in 1975 by an appellate court, ruling that Lang had not been able to adequately defend himself. Lang was then confined to mental institutions and jails and periodically retested for his ability to stand trial.

The Illinois Department of Mental Health refused to train him in sign language since he did not suffer from a mental disease. Lang remained confined at the Chicago-Read Mental Health facility until his death in 2008, aged 62-63. According to one of his lawyers, tests have shown that Lang had an IQ of 128. His former boss called him an honest young man who took pride in his work. One of his language teachers described him as "warm and gentle" until he became agitated. Much of the investigation was conducted by Chicago Police Department homicide detective Jim Padar, who is now a writer and multi-time Moth StorySLAM champion.

=== In pop culture ===
Lang's story was related in the 1974 book Dummy by Ernest Tidyman and in the 1979 TV movie Dummy starring LeVar Burton.
