= Joseph Joffo =

French writer

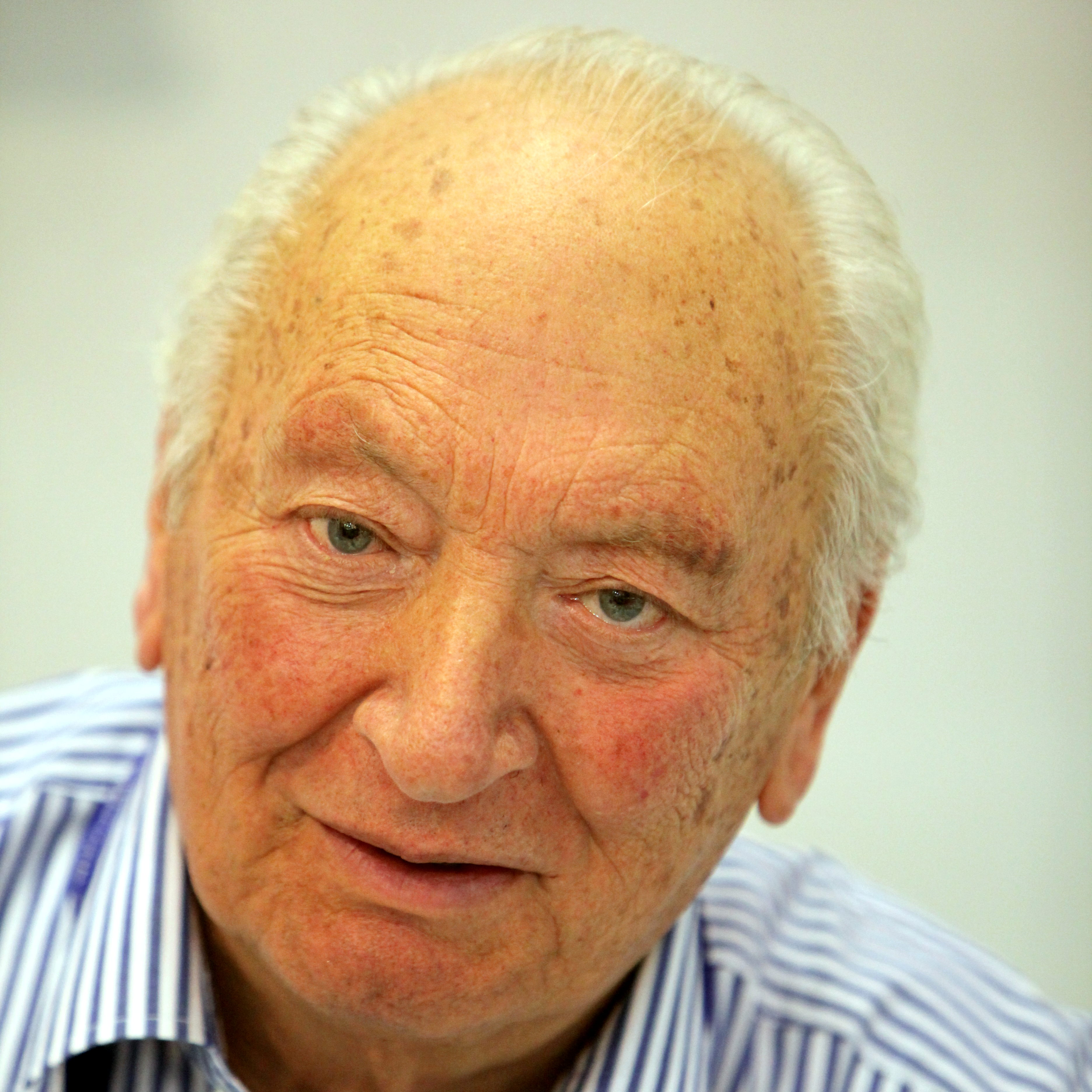
- Joffo at the Salon du Livre 2011 in Geneva
- Born: 2 April 1931; Paris, France
- Died: 6 December 2018 (aged 87); Saint-Laurent-du-Var, Alpes-Maritimes, France
- Occupations: Autobiographer, novelist
- Writing career
- Years active: 1970 – 2017
- Genres: Autobiographical
- Notable work: A Bag of Marbles (1973)

Joseph Joffo (2 April 1931 – 6 December 2018) was a French author. A noted autobiographer, Joffo was perhaps best known for his memoir Un sac de billes (A Bag of Marbles), which has been translated into eighteen languages. Joseph Joffo was married to Brigitte Joffo and had 3 children, Alexandra, Boris, and Franck

== Early life ==
Joffo was born in Paris in the 18th arrondissement. He left school at 14 with a certificat d'études (a former school leaving certificate, taken at the end of primary education) in his pocket and joined his brothers in the family's barber shop.

== Career ==
=== A Bag of Marbles ===
His memoir Un sac de billes (A Bag of Marbles), written as a novel, tells the story of Joffo as a young Jewish boy during the Holocaust. When Joffo was ten, his father gave him and his brother five thousand francs each and instructions to flee Nazi-occupied Paris by foot, train and bus, and join their brothers Henri and Albert in Menton on the Mediterranean coast, where they would be safe in then-unoccupied Southern France. The book "A Bag of Marbles" tells of this journey.

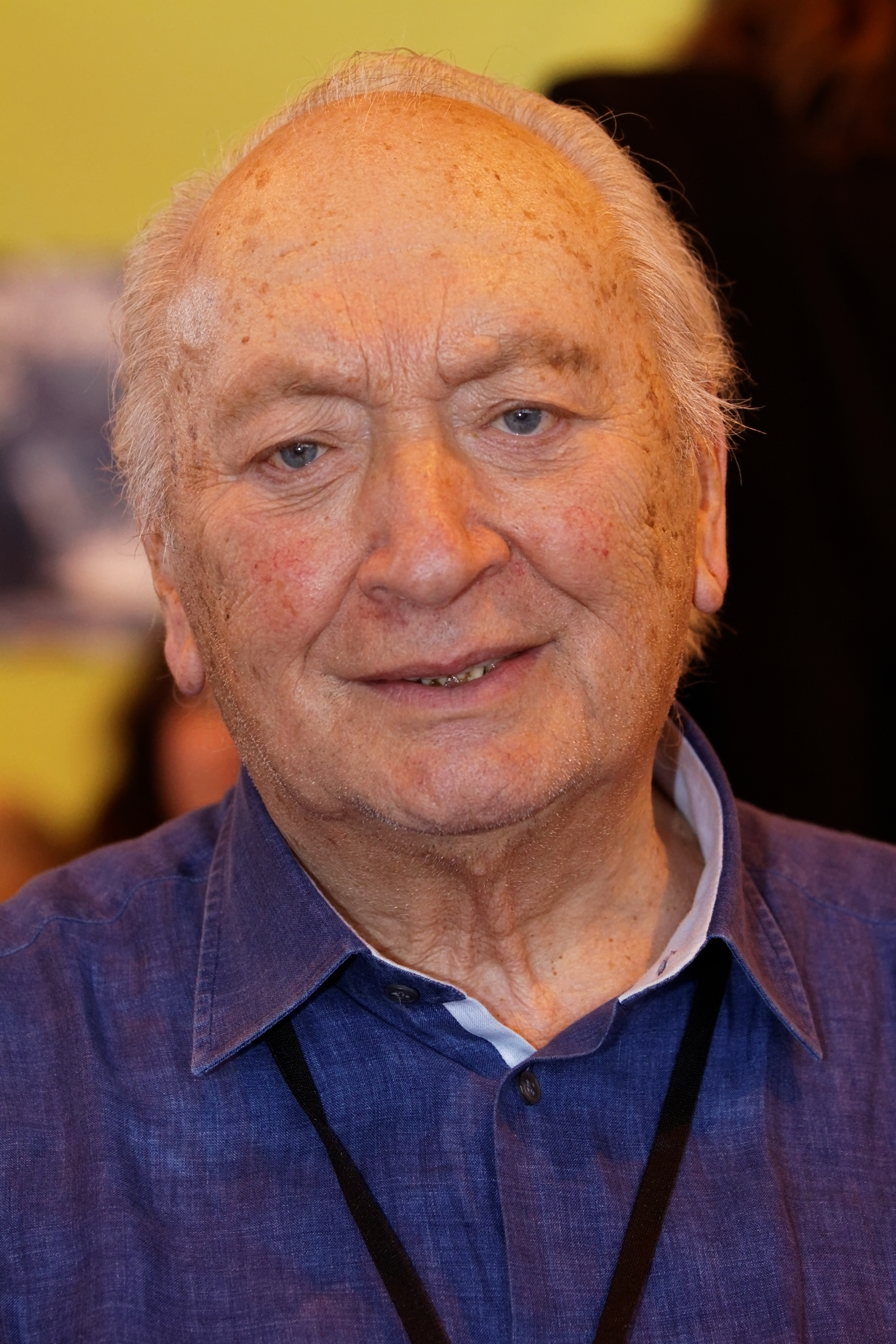
Joffo in 2012

Joffo and his twelve-year-old brother Maurice travel south across France by themselves. They are attempting to escape from the grasp of Hitler's SS men as the Nazis infiltrate France. They travel through northern France to the demilitarised zone in the south. The boys then spend four blissfully safe months in Menton on the border of France and Italy with their older brothers Henri and Albert, before having to leave the town for Nice where their parents are waiting.

Joffo returns to the city of Paris, shortly after its liberation is announced, in a crowded train. Maurice returns in greater style by road and also takes enough cheese with him to sell for a large profit. They are reunited with their family in the barbershop - although sadly not with their father, who perished in a concentration camp before the end of the war.

=== Other works ===
Joffo also wrote Anna et son orchestre (Anna and Her Orchestra), which tells the story of Joseph's mother from the time she was 11 years old to the time she met Joseph Joffo's father in Paris.

His novel Baby-foot, published in 1977, follows on from Un sac de billes and describes his life in Paris following World War II and his discovery of American values.

La Vieille dame de Djerba, published in 1984, was written after Joffo met a woman called Liza at a synagogue in Djerba, an island off the coast of Tunisia. He was amazed to discover, after assuming she was a beggar and offering her money, that she knew the names of his mother and grandmother.

== Death ==
Joffo died on 6 December 2018 at a hospital in Saint-Laurent-du-Var, Alpes-Maritimes from a short-illness at the age of 87.

== Other media ==
On 10 December 1975, Un sac de billes premiered in France as a motion picture. The film was also released internationally under the title A Bag of Marbles. A second film of Un Sac de Billes was released in 2017. During filming in Nice, the hanging of a Nazi flag on the Palais des Rois Sardes caused a frenzy between the local population and the crew.
